= Education in Thrissur District =

Thrissur is a district situated in the central part of Kerala state, India. Thrissur District was formed on 1 July 1949. The headquarters of the district has the same name, Thrissur city. It is an important cultural centre, and is known as the "cultural capital" of Kerala. The number of schools in Thrissur District is numerous. Church Mission Society School started in 1845 is the oldest school and St. Thomas College is the first college in Thrissur. On 2 September 2022, Thrissur joined the UNESCO Global Network of Learning Cities (GNLC).

== Colleges ==
=== Professional College ===
College of Agriculture Vellanikkara, Mannuthy, കേരള കാർഷിക സർവ്വകലാശാല തൃശ്ശൂർ.

=== Engineering Colleges ===
- Government Engineering College, Thrissur, Thrissur
- Christ College of Engineering, Irinjalakuda
- Sahrdaya College of Engineering and Technology, Kodakara, Thrissur
- MET's School of Engineering, Mala, Thrissur
- Royal College of Engineering & Technology, Akkikkavu, Thrissur
- Thejus Engineering College, Erumapetti, Thrissur
- Malabar College of Engineering and Technology, Deshamangalam, Thrissur
- Universal Engineering College, Vellangallore, Thrissur
- Vidya Academy of Science and Technology, Thalakkottukara, Thrissur
- Axis College of Engineering and Technology, Thrissur
- College of Dairy Science and Technology, Thrissur
- IES College of Engineering, Chittilappilly, Thrissur
- Jyothi Engineering College, Cheruthuruthy, Thrissur
- Nirmala College of Engineering, Meloor, Chalakudy, Thrissur
- Sree Ernakulathappan College of Engineering and Management, Mupliyam
- Nehru College of Engineering and Research Centre, Thrissur

=== Law Colleges ===
- Government Law College, Thrissur
- Ambookan Ittoop Memorial (AIM) College of law, Mala, Thrissur district

=== Arts and Science Colleges ===
- Christ College, Irinjalakuda
- St. Thomas College, Thrissur
- St. Aloysius College, Thrissur
- Sree Kerala Varma College, Thrissur
- St. Joseph's College, Irinjalakuda
- Carmel College, Mala
- Little Flower College, Guruvayur
- School of Drama and Fine Arts
- Sree Narayana College, Nattika
- Sree. C. Achutha Menon Govt. College, Kuttanellur, Thrissur
- Sree Krishna College, Guruvayur
- K.K.T.M Govt. College, Pullut, Kodungallur
- IIBMR college, Thrissur
- Sree Vyasa N.S.S. College, Vyasagiri, Wadakkanchery
- Ansar Computer College, Perumbilavu
- Ansar Women's college, Perumbilavu
- M. E. S. Asmabi College, Padinjare Vemballur, SN Puram, Kodungalloor
- Sacred Heart College for Women, Chalakkudy
- Sree Narayana Guru College Of Advanced Studies, Nattika
- Prajyothi Niketan College, Pudukkad
- Panampilly Memorial Govt. College, Chalakkudy
- Naipunnya Institute of Management & Computer Technology, Pongam, Koratty
- Mother Arts & Science College (unaided), Poovathur, Near Mullassery, Thrissur
- A.C. Kunhimon Haji Memorial I.C.A College Thozhiyur
- Ansar Women's College, Perumpilavu
- Don Bosco College, Mannuthy
- Mar Dionysius College, Pazhanji
- Sree Vivekananda College, Kunnamkulam
- College of Applied Science, Chelakkara, Pazhayannur
- College of Applied Science, Valappad
- Thaqwa Aflal-ul-ulama Arabic College, Andathode, Thrissur
- Jyothis College, Irinjalakuda
- UEIT College of Management & Technology, Ayyanthole, Chungam, Trichur

=== Nursing colleges ===
- St. James College of Nursing, Chalakkudy, Thrissur
- Govt. College of Nursing, M.G Kavu, Thrissur

=== Pharmaceutical Colleges ===
- IIAHSR paramedical College.koorkenchery, Thrissur
- Nehru College of Pharmacy, Pampady, Thiruvillwamala, Thrissur
- St. James College of Pharmaceutical Sciences, Chalakudy, Thrissur

=== Training Colleges ===
- Government Institute of Advanced Study in Education (IASE), Thrissur, Palace Road, Thrissur
- Jesus Training College, Neithakudy, Mala.
- Dr. Palpu Memorial S.N.D.P Yogam College of Education, Kodungallur
- Ansar Training College for Women, Perumpilavu
- Euphrasia Training College, Irinjalakuda
- St. Joseph's Training College, Pavaratty
- Mar Osthatheos Training College, Perumpilavu, Kunnamkulam
- Arafa Institute for Teacher Education (unaided) Arafa Nagar, Attur
- Hindi Prachara Kendra College of Teacher Education, Kodungallur
- Vikram Sarabhai B Ed College, Kaipamangalam

== Schools ==
=== Government Schools ===
- Ayiranikulam GHSS Kakkilassery
- GHSS Machad
- Chaipankuzhy HSS Kuttichira
- Chalakudy GVHSS Chalakudy
- Chalakudy GHS Chalakudy
- Chamakala Mappila HS, Chamakala
- Chavakkad HSS, Chavakkad
- Chelakkara SMTHSS, Chelakkara
- Cheruthuruthy HSS Vallathol Nagar
- Chempuchira HS Mattathur
- Govt.MRS Chalakudy Chalakudy
- DesamangalamVHS, Desamangalam
- Edavilangu HSS Edavilangu
- Eriyad K.V. HSS Eriyad
- Elavally HS Elavally
- Erumapetty HSS Erumapetty
- Irinjalakuda Mode BVHSS Irinjalakuda
- Irinjalakuda Model GVHSS Irinjalakuda
- Karupadanna HSS karupadanna
- Kattoor HS Katoor
- Kodakara GHS Kodakara
- Kodakara MBHS Kodakara
- Kodungalloor BHS Kodungalloor
- Kodungalloor GHS Kodungalloor
- Kuzhur HS kuzhur
- Kadappuram VHSS, Kadappuram
- Kadavalloor HS Kadavalloor
- Kadikkad HS Punnayoorkulam
- Kaipamangalam GFVHS, Kaipamangalam
- Kattilapoovam GHSS Kattilapoovam
- Kochannoor HSS Kochannoor
- Kunnamkulam Model BHSS, Kunnamkulam
- Kunnamkulam Model GHSS, Kunnamkulam
- Meladur SHSS Meladur
- Muppiliyam HS Mupliyam
- Machad HSS Thekumkara
- Manathala HS Manathala
- Marathancode HS Marathancode
- Mullassery HSS Mullassery
- Nadavarambu GVHSS Nadavarambu
- Nandikkara GVHSS Nandikkara
- Nattika HSS Nattika Beech
- Pampady HS Pampady, Thiruvilwamala
- Panjal HS Panjal, Pazhayannur
- Pazhanji VHS Pazhanji
- Pazhayannur HSS Pazhayannur
- PuthenchiraGV HSS Puthenchira
- PuthukkadVHSS Pudukkad
- Thalikulam VHSS Thalikulam
- Thayyoor HS Thayyoor, Wadakkancherry
- Thiruvilwamala VHS Thiruvilwamala
- Santhipuram MARMHS Panangad
- Sree Rama Varma Music School
- Vadakancherry BVHSS Vadakencherry
- Vadakancherry GHS Vadakencherry
- Vadanappilly HS Vadanappally
- Valappad VHS Vadappad
- Varavoor HSS Varavoor, Wadakkancherry
- Velur RGRVHSS Velur, Wadakkancherry
- V.K..Raja Memorial GHS Pullut
- Vettilappara VHSS Vettilappara
- Vijayaraghavapuram HS Vijanaraghavapuram
- Villadom GHSS Villadom
- GHSS vadanapplly

=== Aided Schools ===
- Aryampadam Sarvodaya HS Puduruthi
- Aloor R.M. HSS Aloor
- Aloor S.N.V. HS Aloor
- Anandapuram S.K. HS Anandapuram
- Annanadu GHS Annanadu
- Ashtramichira SHS Ashtramichira
- Avittathur LB.S.M. HSS Avittathur
- Azheekode S.M. HS Azheekode
- Bhramakulam St. Therasan GHS Bharanakulam
- Chalakudy S.S.H.C. GHSS Chalakudy
- Chengaloor St. M. HS Chengaloor
- Chavakkad MRRMHS Chavakkad
- Chelakkara LFC GHS Chelakkara
- Chemmannur A.M HS Chemmannur
- Chendrapinni HS Chendrapinni
- Chittattukara St. Sebastian HS, Chittattukara
- Choondal LIGHS, Choondal
- Chovannur St. Mary's GHS, Chownnur
- Deepthi High School, Thalore
- Deepthi Higher Secondary School, Thalore
- Edakazhiyoor S.S.M.F. VHSS, Edakazhiyoor
- Edathiruthi St. Annes HS, Edathiruthi
- Elanad MLKAM HS, Elanad
- Enamkkal St. Joseph HS, Enamakkal
- Engandiyoor NHSS, Engandiyoor
- Engandiyoor St. Thomas HS, Engandiyoor
- Edathirinji H.D.P. HSS Edathirinji
- Guruvayoor GKHSS, Guruvayoor
- Gnanodayam Upper Primary School, Chittanda
- Kalamandalam HSS, Cheruthuruthy
- Kazhimpram VPM SNDP HSS Kazhimpram
- Keecherry Al-Amin HS Keecherry
- Kundukadu Nirmala HS Kundukada
- Kunnamkulam BCGHS Kunnamkulam
- Kunnamkulam MJDHS Kunnamkulam
- Kallettumkara B.V.M. HS Kallettumkara
- Kalparamba B.V.M. HS Aripalam
- Karalom VHS Karalom
- Karanchira St. X HS Karanchira
- Karuvannoor St. JC GHS Karuvannoor
- Kattoor Pompei St. M. HS Kattoor
- Kodakara St. DB GHS Kodakkaraa
- Koratty LFC GHS Koratty
- Koratty MAM HS Koratty
- Kottakal S.. CGHSS Mala
- Kottappuram St. Annes GHS
- Kottat St. A.C GHS Chalakudy West
- Kuttikkad St. S. HSS Kuttikkad
- Kuzhikkattussery St. Mary's GHSS Kuzhikattussery
- Mammiyoor LFCGHSS Mammiyoor
- Mattom St. Francis BHSS Mattom
- Mattom St. Francis GHSS Mattom
- Mayannur St. Thomas HS Mayannur
- Mullurkara NSS HS Mulloorkara
- Mundathicode NSS VHSS Mundathikode
- Mala St. Antony's HSS Mala
- Mambra UHSS Erayamkudi
- Mapranam HC HS Maprana
- Mathilakom OLF HSS Mathilakom
- Mathilakom St. J HS Mathilakom
- Mattathur G.K. HS Mattathur
- Meloor St. J.HS Meloor
- Moorkanad St. Antony's HS Moorkanad
- M E S H.S, P.Vembellur
- I.E.S Chittilapilli, Chittilapilli
- Irinjalakuda L. F. C. H. S. S., Irinjalakuda
- Irinjalakuda N. HSS Irinjalakuda
- Irinjalakuda S. N. H. S. S., Irinjalakuda
- Irinjalakuda St. M. HSS Irinjalakuda
- Nattika SN Trust HSS Nattika Beech
- Orumanayur Islamic HS Orumanayur
- Padoor Alimul Islam HSS Padoor
- Pangarippally St. Joseph HS Pangarappally
- Pavaratti CKC GHS Pavaratty
- Pavaratti St. Joseph HSS Pavaratty
- Pengamukku HS Pengamukku
- Peringanam RMVHSS Peringanam
- Perumpilavu TM HS Perumpillavu
- Pallissery S.ND.P. HSS Annamanada
- Panangad HSS Panangad
- Parappukara P.V.GHS Parappookara
- Pariyaram St. George HS Pariyaram
- Poyya A.K.M. HS Poyya
- Puthenchira THS Puthenchira
- Puthukad St. Antony's HSS Puthukad
- Sacred Heart Convent Girls Higher Secondary, Thrissur
- St. Mary's Convent Girls High School, Ollur
- Thiruvilayannur HS Kallur
- Thozhiyoor St. George HS Thozhiyoor
- Thykad South Vram HS Bhramakulam
- Thirumudikunnu P.S. HS Kizhakummuri
- Thanissery South St. Antony's GHS Kakulassery
- Thumboor RHS Thumboor
- Vadanapplly KNM VHSS Vadanappally
- Venmanad MASM VHSS Venmanad
- Valoor N.S. HS Cheruvalloor.
- Vellikulangara P.C. GHS Vellikulangara
- Vynthala St. Mary's HS Palamparamb
- West Mangad St: Joseph's & St: Cyril's H.S.S West Mangad

=== Unaided (Private Schools) ===
- Aloor St. Joseph (EM) HS Aloor
- Anandapuram St. Joseph (EM) HS Anandapuram
- Al ameen Eng School Karikkad
- Ansar English School
- Assisi Eng School, Choondal
- Bharatiya Vidya Bhavan, Poochatty
- Choondal De Paul EM HS, Choondal
- Chalakudy carmel HS, Chalakudy
- Chaldean Syrian Higher Secondary School, Thrissur
- Chinmaya Vidyalaya, Kolazhy
- Christ Vidyanikethan, Irinjalakuda
- Concord Eng School Chiramanangad
- CSM Central School, Edassery
- Deepthi Higher Secondary School (Unaided), Thalore
- Devamatha CMI Cambridge International School, Thangaloor
- Devamatha CMI Public School, Thiruvambadi
- Darul Quran Residential School Kallumpuram
- Excel Public School, Kunnamkulam
- Irinjalakuda Don Bosco HS Irinjalakuda
- IES Public School, Chitilappilly
- IDC Eng School Orumanayur
- J.M.J.E.N. HS Integrated for Blind Athani
- Kadappuram Focus Islamic EM HS Kadappuram
- Kulapathi Munshi Bhavan's Vidya Mandir, Pottore
- Kunnamkulam Bethany St. Johns English HS Kunnamkulam
- Lemer Public School, Triprayar
- Madar English Medium School, Vadanappally
- Mamba ul Huda English School, Kechery
- NATIONAL HUDA CENTRAL SCHOOL, Orumanayur
- OIET public School, Kechery
- Seventh-Day Adventist Higher Secondary School, Moospet Road, Thrissur
- Shantiniketan International School, Kodungallur
- Sirajul Uloom Eng school, Kadavallur
- Snehagiri Holy Child (EM) HS, Kuruvilassery
- S.M.NSS Eng.M.S, Irinjalakuda
- Sree Gokulam Public School, Chittattukara
- St.MMCHS, Kanippayyoor
- St Joseph's Model School, Kuriachira
- Thozhiyoor Rehmath EM HS Thozhiyoor
- Thaqua Residential GHS Andathode A
- Thaqua Residential HS Andathode
- Vellikulangara Vimala HS Vellikulangara
- Vimala College, Thrissur
- Vidhya jothy E M S, Aripalam Aripalam
- Vadakkekad ICA EM HS Vadakkekad

== Special schools ==
- Bala sahithya Samithi Chaithanya Special School, Kunnamkulam
- Carmel Mount Special School, Mulloorkara
- Cyrene Charitable Society Special School, Kodunga
- Madona Special School, Potta
- Infant Jesus Mentally Retarded School, Eranellur
- Pope Paul Mercy Home (Grown Up Boys), Peringandoor
- Pope Paul Mercy Home (Grown Up Girls), Peringandoor
- Pope Paul Mercy Home Teachers Training Centre, Peringandoor
- Pope Paul Mercy Home Santhivanam Project for Children, Peringandoor
- Padma Educational Charitable Establishment, Kodungallur
- Pope Paul Peace Home, Peringandoor
- Pratheeksha Trining Centre, Irinjalakud
- Sneha Deepthi Special School, Mannuthy
- Snehagiri Mithralayam Special School, Mala
- Sneharam Training Centre Special School, Manaloor
- Tropical Health Foundation of India, Kunnamkulam
- Reach Swasraya Special School, Kuttur

== Teachers Training Institutes ==
- Azhikode SSMTTI, Azhikode
- Cheruthuruthy SN TTI Cheruthuruthy
- Chalakudy G. TTI Chalakudy
- KrishnaTTI, Pangad
- Irinjalakuda LC TTI Irinjalakuda
- Irinjalakuda S.N. TTI Irinjalakuda
- Pavaratty CKC TTI Pavaratty
- Mar Asthathious TTI, Perimpilavu
- Vikram Sarabai TTI, Kaipamangalam
