= Mar Sleeva Syro-Malabar Church, Mapranam =

Building in Kerala, India

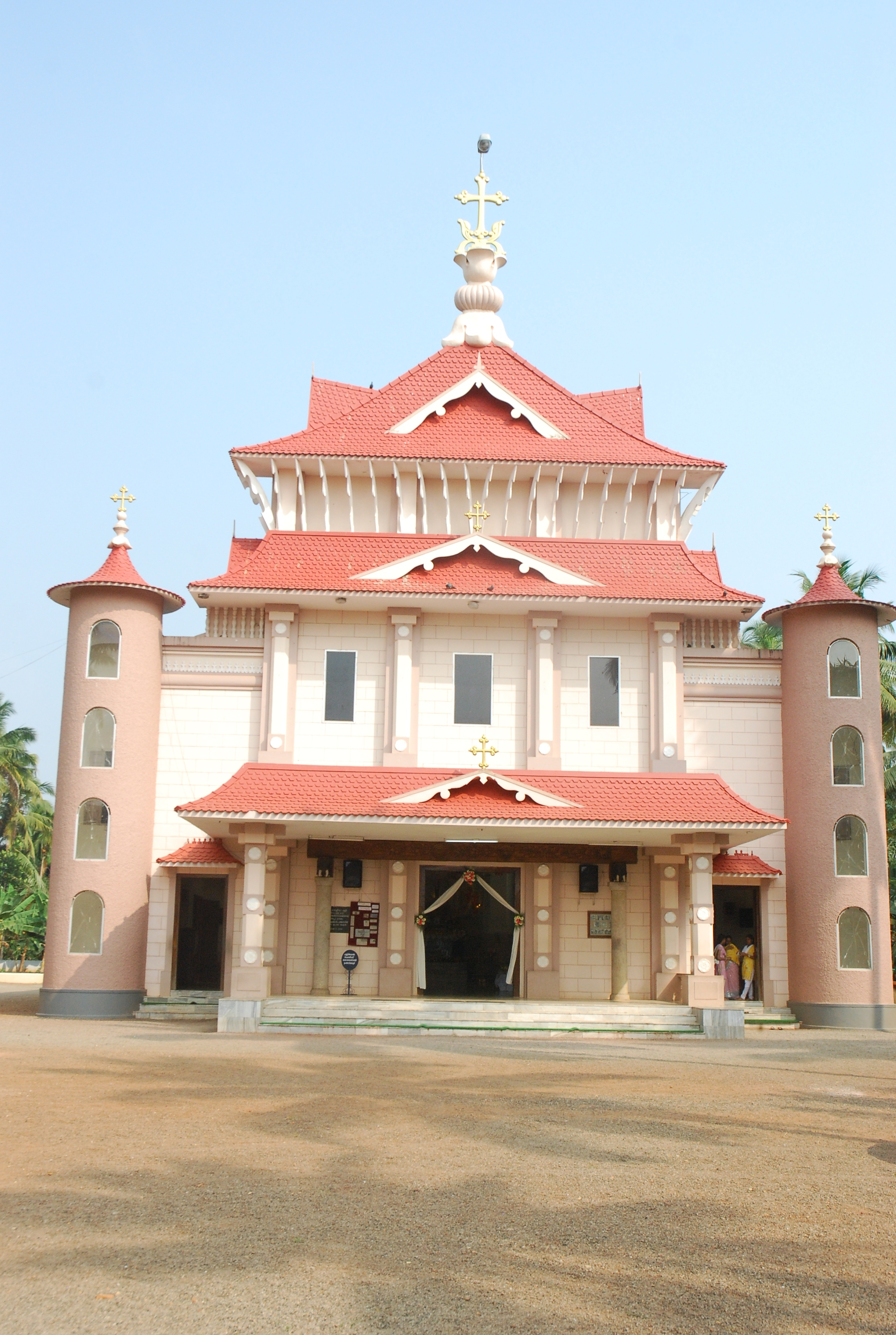
Holy Cross Shrine Mapranam

Mar Sleeva Syro-Malabar Church, Mapranam (Malayalam: മാപ്രാണം മാർ സ്ലീവാ പള്ളി), Thrissur is one of the few churches in Asia which has received the relic of the Holy Cross, part of the Holy blood of Jesus Christ and a piece of the towel used by Veronica to wipe the face of Jesus Christ, during the journey of the Passion, all donated from Vatican by the order of the Pope Leo XIII. Believed to have been constructed in AD 928, it is one of the oldest churches not only in Kerala state, India, but also in India. North of it lies Karuvannur River, the Arattupuzha Temple and the churches of Pallissery and Panamkulam.

The Church is a part of Irinjalakuda diocese and is a historically and archeologically renowned pilgrim centre. It was recently renovated and attracts worshippers beyond religious barriers.

The offering of candles is the main ritual here and the annual ceremony is called Thirithelikkal (Candle Lighting). A candle made at this Church has been included in the Limca Book of Records as the largest candle in India. According to the book the candle has a weight of 1,079 kg and a height of 22 ft. On 14 September every year Christians all over the world celebrate the Exaltation of the Holy Cross and this same dayMapranam Church celebrates the main feast in the name of the Holy Cross.

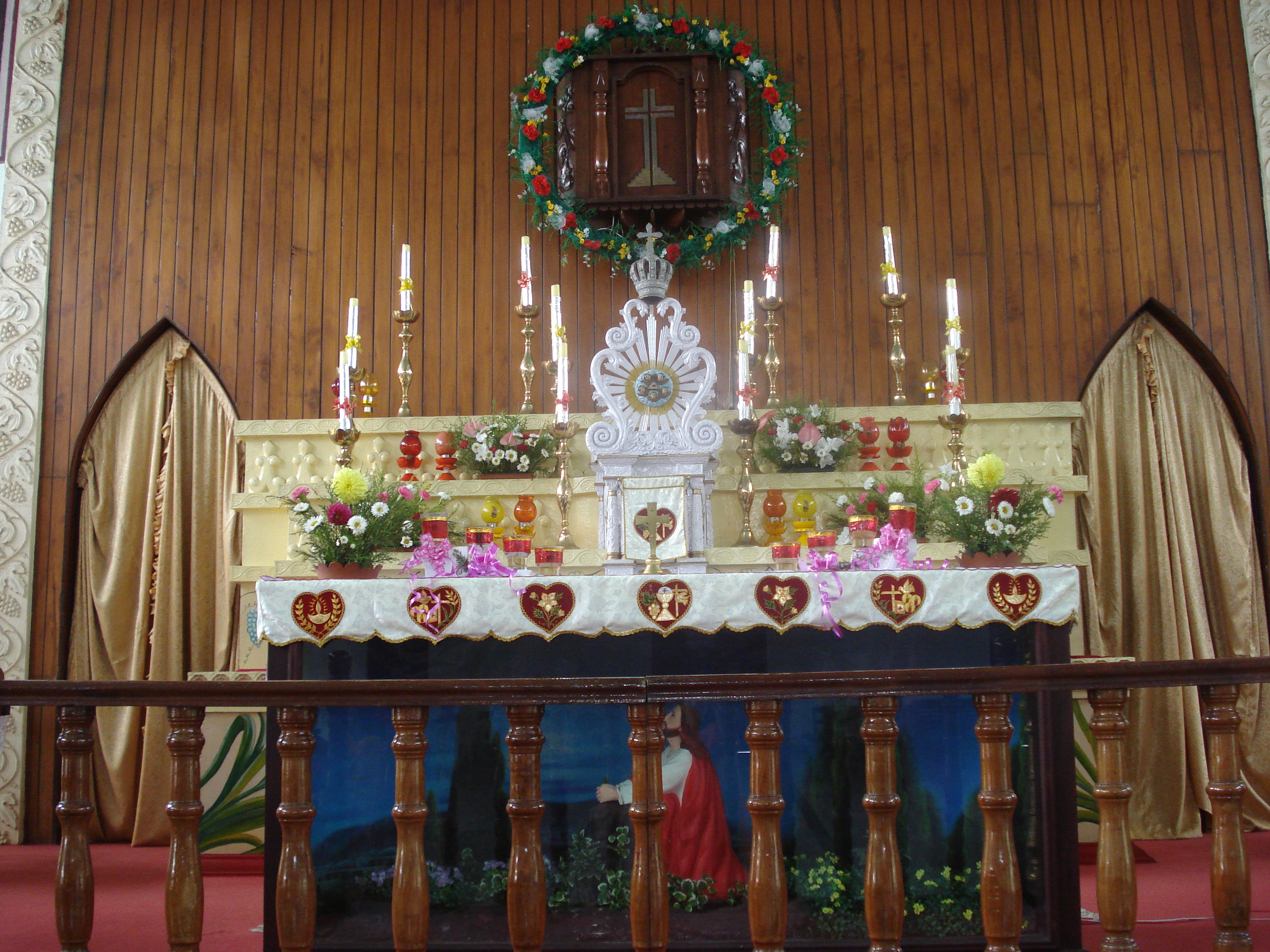
Holy Cross Shrine Mapranam Altar
