= Varavoor =

- Residential Village
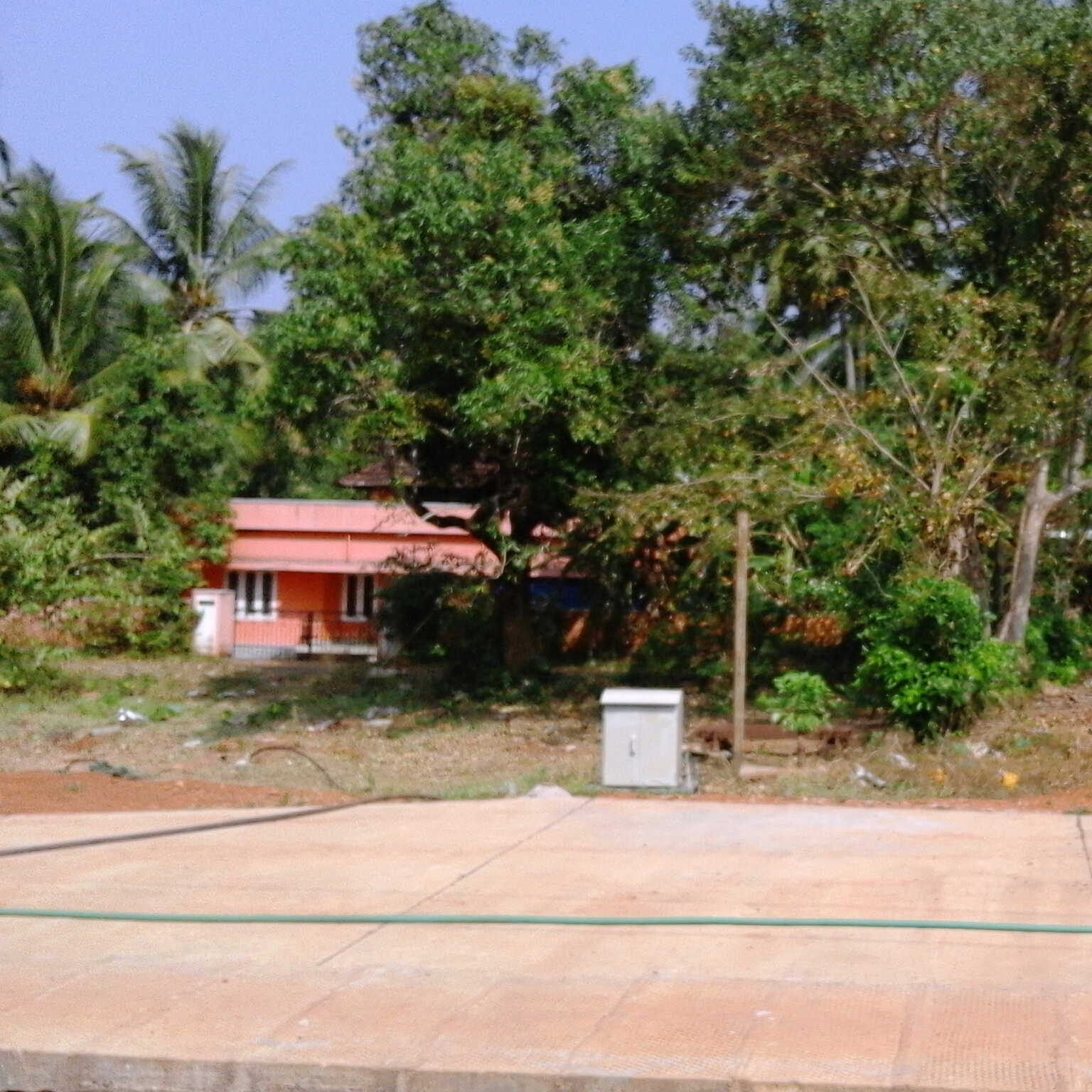
- Mulloorkkara Railway Station near Varavoor

- Location in Kerala, India Varavoor (India)
- Coordinates: 10°43′0″N 76°13′0″E
- Country: India
- State: Kerala
- District: Thrissur

Population (2011)
  - Total: 8,944

Languages
  - Official: Malayalam, English
- Time zone: UTC+5:30 (IST)
- PIN: 680585
- Telephone code: 04884
- Vehicle registration: KL-48
- Nearest city: Thrissur
- Lok Sabha constituency: Alathur

Varavoor, a residential village in Thrissur district is in the state of Kerala, India. It is widely believed that this village was situated on the banks of Bharathapuzha during prehistoric times. Shrinking of the river over several millennia of human settlements has moved the village more distant from its banks. It is surrounded by small green hills and is 30 mins drive away from the cultural capital of Kerala. Varavoor was declared "litigation-free" village on 7 May 2000. Climatic conditions in and around Varavoor varies around the year. The well-known Palakkal Pooram is usually held in the month of February welcoming tourists from different parts of the country. During the month of February, paddy fields surrounding the Palakkal temple is usually fallow after harvest.

== Flora and Fauna ==
Varavoor is home to a wide variety of flora and fauna. Several herbs and plant species are found in small patches around the place. Main occupation of the people used to be agriculture. Many youngsters had relocated to cities looking for a white collar job in the past and agriculture has since taken a backseat, like elsewhere in the state. Once lush green paddy fields are now dry barren pieces of land. Animals mainly include domestic livestock and cattle. Small animals like mongoose, porcupine, squirrels etc. were once in abundance. When the habitat of animals like snakes, peacocks, foxes, monkeys, deer and boars were disturbed, they took on to the remaining paddy fields and rubber plantations. Now many of these animals are sighted regularly in the fields and bushes. Depletion of water bodies have driven away many species of birds which used to flock in and roost in the locality.

== Demographics ==
As of 2011 India census, Varavoor had a population of 8944 with 4278 males and 4666 females.

== Geology ==
Outskirts of Varavoor were found to be the epicenter of tremors and relatively strong quakes reported in the district. A seismometer has also been installed in the locality to record these tremors.

== Culture and Religion ==
This village was a part of Chera Kingdom once and was later invaded by Tipu Sultan. Chera kings were ardent Shaivas and the legend says that they had built 108 Shiva temples in the neighborhood. Almost all these temples were lost in the ebb of time. Thanks to Archaeological Survey of India, we can still experience the ancient temple architecture in Thirumathaliyappan temple, preserved intact. The villagers have also resurrected some Shivalingas from ruins and one such Shivalinga worshipped in Keezhthali Mahadeva Temple stands tall as one of the biggest In India.

Remnants of ancient homes and burial urns were also discovered and excavated not very far from the locality. The village is now religiously and culturally rich with Hinduism, Islam and Christianity in practice. A dilapidated shrine, believed to be that of a Jain temple, is also found at a distance of 15 Km from here, approx.

=== Churches ===
- Our Lady of Divine Love Church Varavoor

=== Temples ===
- Cheloor Sri Devi Chira Anthimahakalankavu
- Varavur Palakkal Bhagawathy Temple
- Keezhthali Sree Mahadeva Temple
- Ramankulangara Ayyappan Kavu Temple
- Moorkkan Kulangara Sree Mahadeva Temple
- Methrukkovil Kottaram Shiva Temple
- Thali Nedumbrayur Thirumuthaliyappan Temple
- Sree Viruttanam Bhagavathy temple
- Madapathi Ayyappan kovil

=== Mosques ===
- Thali Mosque
- Thaqwa Masjid Thali
- Mohiyuddin Masjid Naduvattam
- Varavoor Makham Sherief (Valavu)
- Kumarappanal Mosque
- Kottupuram Mosque

== Transport ==
Varavoor is connected by road and rail.

=== Road ===
From State Highway 22 (Thrissur - Shornoor high way SH22) Varavoor is 10 minutes drive.

=== Rail ===
- Mullurkara railway station - 7 km away
- Vallathol Nagar railway station - 8 km away
- Wadakkanchery railway station - 11 km away
- Shoranur Junction railway station - 13 km away
- Thrissur railway station - 25 km away

=== Air ===
- Cochin International Airport - 78 km
- Calicut International Airport - 78 km

== Landmarks ==
The Kerala Kalamandalam is just 20 min drive from here.

The popular landmark in Varavoor is the Varavoor Valavu junction Varavoor Valavu Junction

== Post Office ==
The Varavoor Post Office is situated on the Chittanda-Thallasery Road. It is just 400 meters from the Panchayat office and 600 metres for Varavoor Valavu Junction Varavoor Post Office

== Educational Institutions ==
=== Schools ===
- Government Lower Primary School, Varavoor.
- Government Higher Secondary School, Varavoor
- ANMM UP school, Thali
- Rose Garden English School, Thali
- St. Joseph School Kudannur
- Kanjirakode LP School

=== Higher Education ===
- Malabar College of Engineering and Technology (15 min from Varavoor)

Malabar College of Engineering and Technology is promoted by the IQRA Educational and Charitable Trust. The IQRA Educational and Charitable Trust have dedicated itself to the cause of knowledge and empowerment, with special focus, on technical education for the educationally, socially and economically backward communities. In the light of this, MCET is established in 2009 by an order of the Government of Kerala, approved by AICTE New Delhi and affiliated to Calicut University.

- Jyothi Engineering College (30 min drive from Varavoor)

Jyothi Engineering College, Cheruthuruthy, Thrissur (JECC), run under the aegis of the Trichur Educational Trust, which in turn is a part of the Archdiocese of Trichur, is a centre for higher education in the field of engineering, in the state of Kerala, India. It is an AICTE approved institution and is affiliated to the University of Calicut. The college was started in the year 2002.

- Kerala Kalamandalam Deemed University for Art and Culture (25 min drive from Varavoor)

Kerala Kalamandalam (Malayalam: കേരള കലാമണ്ഡലം), lately renamed as Kalamandalam Deemed University of Art and Culture, is a major centre for learning Indian performing arts, especially those that developed in the southern state of Kerala. It is situated in the village of Cheruthuruthy in Thrissur District on the banks of the Bharathapuzha river. The institution, now a deemed university, was founded in 1930 by poet Vallathol Narayana Menon and Manakkulam Mukunda Raja. Kalamandalam imparts training in classical dance and theatre forms like Kathakali, Mohiniyattam, Kudiyattam, Thullal, Kuchipudi, Bharatanatyam, and Nangiar Koothu, besides the traditional orchestra called Panchavadyam. Training is also given in various percussion instruments like chenda, maddalam and mizhavu.

- Government Medical College, Thrissur (45 min drive from Varavoor)
- Vidya Academy of Science and Technology (30 min drive from Varavoor)
