= Karoor =

Karoor (കാരൂർ)
- Village
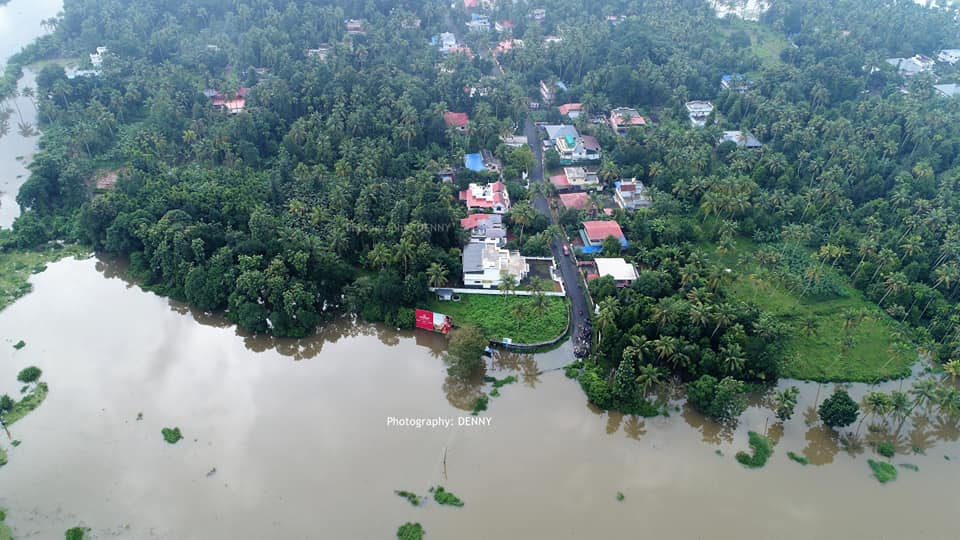
- Karoor Areal View

- Location in Kerala, India Karoor (കാരൂർ) (India)
- Coordinates: 10.307772°N 76.293204°E
- Country: India
- State: Kerala
- District: Thrissur District

Government
  - Type: Village
  - Body: Grama Panchayath

Languages
  - Official: Malayalam
- Time zone: UTC+5:30 (IST)
- PIN: 680684
- Telephone code: 0480
- Vehicle registration: KL-64, KL-8, KL-45
- Nearest city: Chalakudy, Irinjalakuda and Mala
- Literacy: 100%%
- Lok Sabha constituency: Thrissur
- Vidhan Sabha constituency: Irinjalakuda
- Climate: Seasonal (Köppen)

Karoor (കാരൂർ) is a village in Aloor, Kerala in Thrissur district of Kerala, India. Karoor is located 30 km from the city of Thrissur and 12 km from Irinjalakuda Town and 8 km from Chalakudy Town and 8 km from Mala, Kerala Town.

== About ==
Karoor (കാരൂർ) is a small village in Mala Block comes under in Chalakudy taluk (Old Name Mukundapuram taluks) in Thrissur District of Kerala State, India. It comes under Aloor Panchayath, falls under the Thrissur Lok Sabha constituency and Irinjalakuda (Assembly constituency) It belongs to Central Kerala Division. Karoor Pin code is 680697 and postal head office is Kallettumkara.

Recent History

In 1762 Maharaja, Kingdom of Cochin formed Mukundapuram Taluk taluk by adding Mapranam nadu (Velllos nad) and parts of Nandilathnadu to Mukundapuramnadu (Muriyanad) and also formed Kodassery taluk with headquarters at Chalakudy. Karoor muri (Karoor, Vellanchira and Thuruthiparambu) was part of Kodassery taluk and other areas were part of Mukundapuram taluk. Sakthan Thampuran divided old Mukundapuram taluk into six areas (Thazhekkad, Irinjalakkuda, Aripalam, Mukundapuram (Nadavarambu), Mapranam, Palathingal (Nandikkara), and Pudukkad) for administrative and revenue purposes. Revenue villages in Aloor Panchayat are Kallettumkara, Thazhekkad & Aloor came into existence in M.E 1080 (AD 1905).

== Way to Reach ==
Karoor is 30 km away from Thrissur town, the district headquarters of Thrissur. It is located 2 km away from Kombodinjamakkal on the State Highway 51 (Kerala) from the Kodakara-Kodungallur route and 8 km from Chalakudy on the NH 544 (Old No-NH 47). Nearby towns are Mala & Chalakudy & Irinjalakuda and Nearest railway station is Chalakudi railway station which is 4 km away.

== Education ==
- St Marys UP School Karoor

The school ST MARYS UPS KAROOR is located in the area KARUR-08 of MALA. ST MARYS UPS KAROOR is in the THRISSUR district of KERALA state. pincode is 680697. ST MARYS UPS KAROOR MALA was established in the year 1924. The management of ST MARYS UPS KAROOR is Private Aided. ST MARYS UPS KAROOR is a Primary with Upper Primary school. The coeducation status of ST MARYS UPS KAROOR is Co-Educational. The medium of instruction in ST MARYS UPS KAROOR is Malayalam & English.

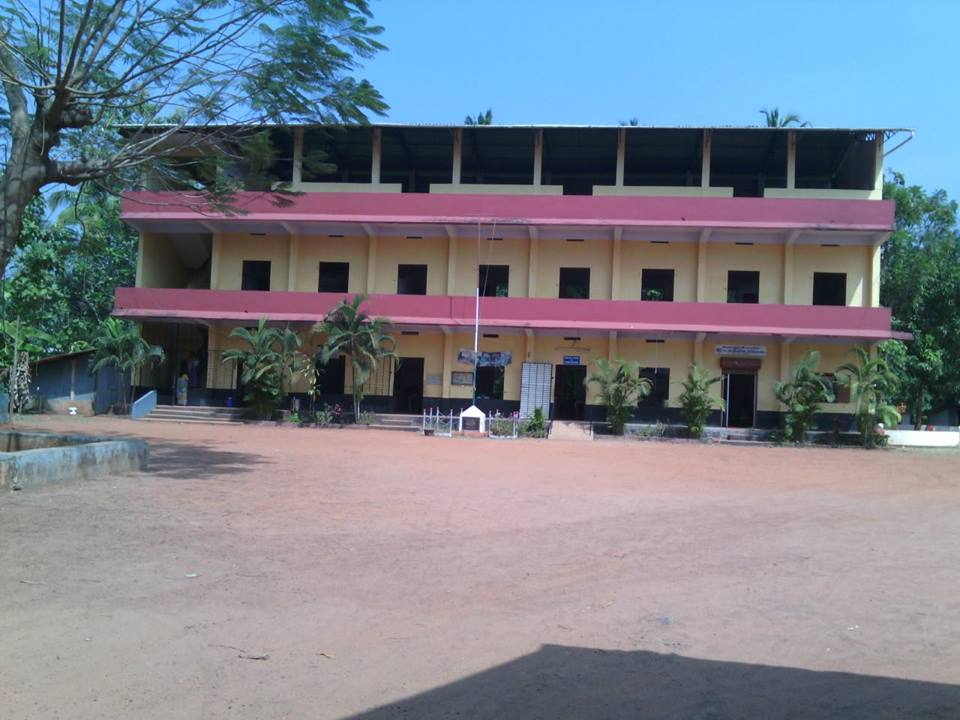
St.Marys UP School Karoor

== Places of Worship ==
- St.Mary's Rosary Church Karoor *

സെൻറ്.മേരീസ് റോസറി ചർച്ച് കാരൂർ

THIS PARISH BELONGS TO THE DIOCESE OF IRINJALAKUDA. IT HAS CELEBRATED ITS 125 YEARS. IT HAS AROUND 550 FAMILIES. THIS PARISH IS BLESSED BY MANY PRIESTS.

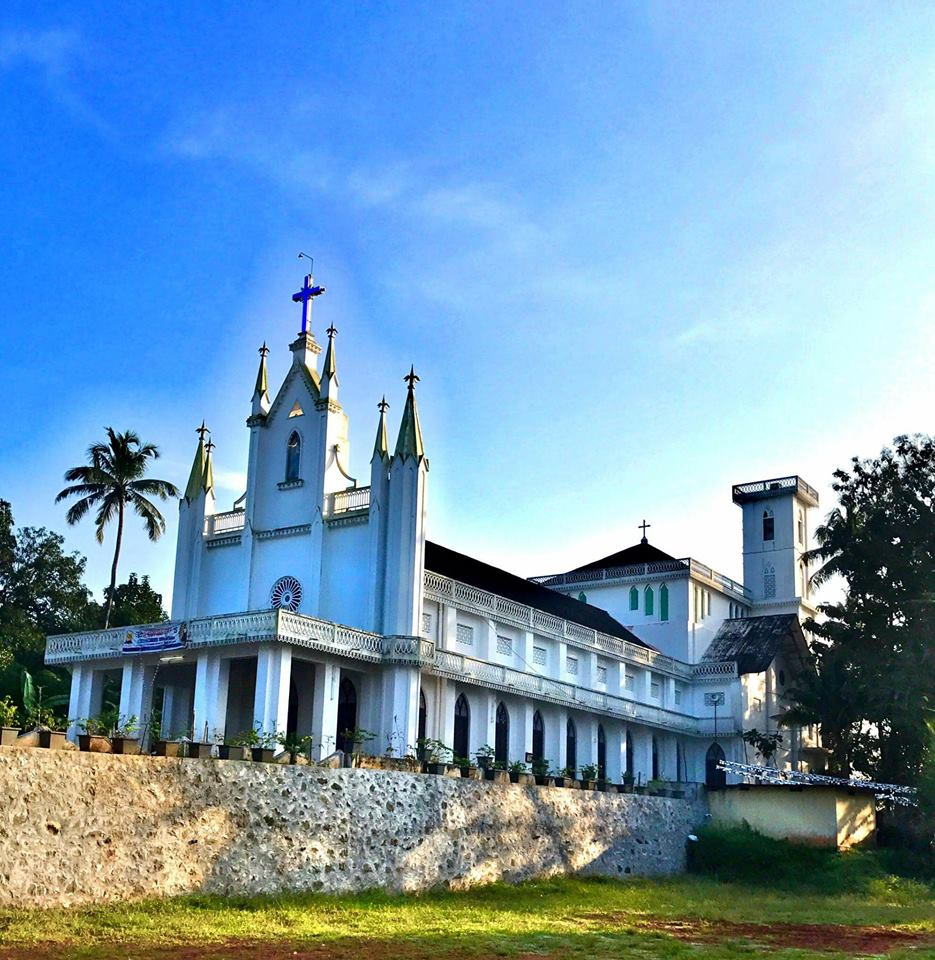
St.Mary's Rosary Church Karoor

- Blessed Mariam Thressia church, Sholayar, Karoor *

ബ്ലെസ്സഡ്.മറിയം ത്രേസ്സ്യ ചർച്ച് ഷോളയാർ, കാരൂർ

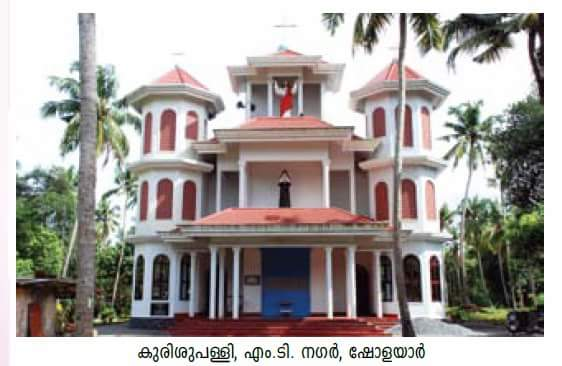
Blessed Mariam Thressia church, Sholayar, Karoor

- Karoor Juma Masjid *

ജുമാ മസ്ജിദ് കാരൂർ

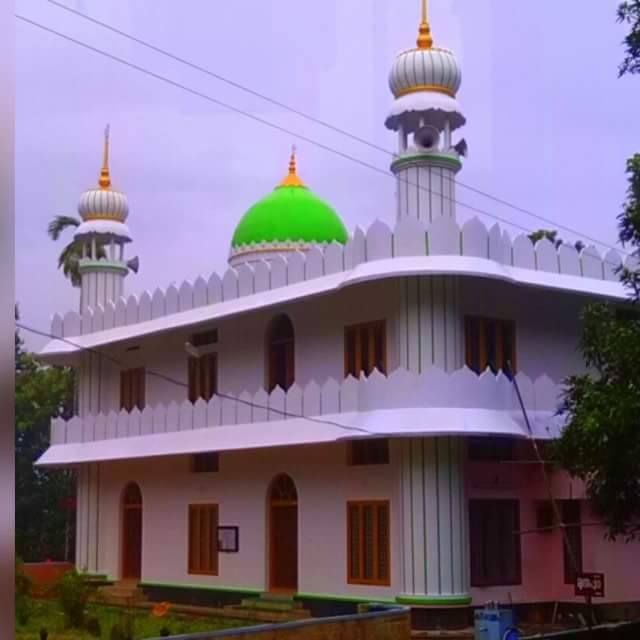
Juma Masjid Karoor

- Sreedhanakkavu Bhagavathy Temple Karoor *

ശ്രീധനക്കാവ് ഭഗവതി ക്ഷേത്രം കാരൂർ

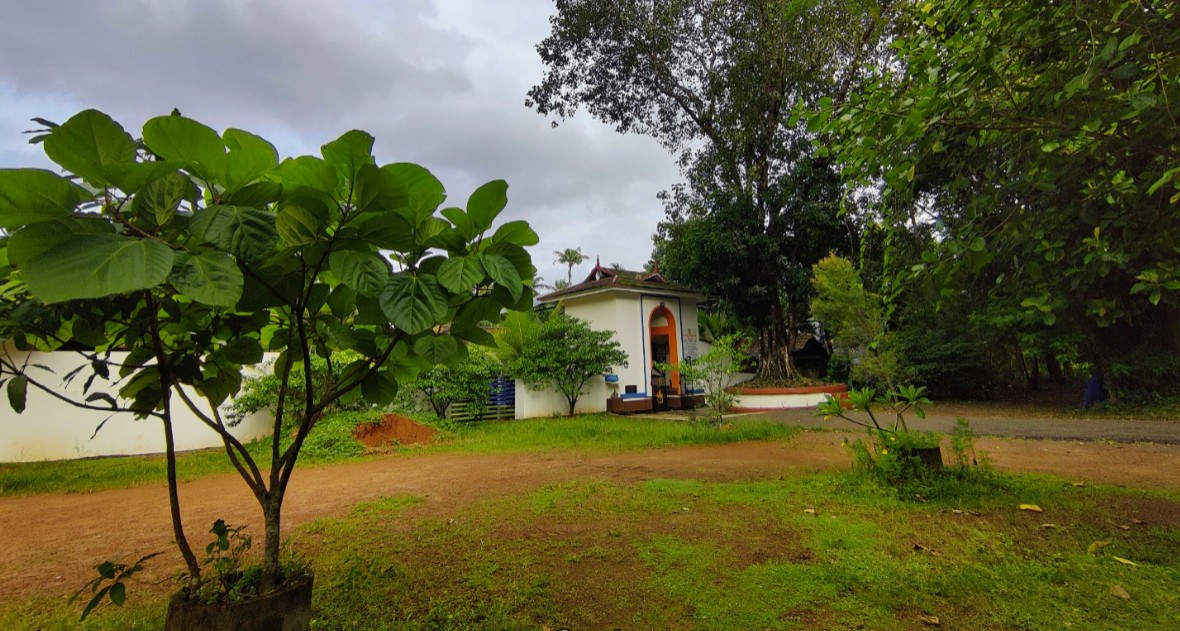
Sreedhanakkavu Bhagavathy Temple Karoor
