= Muthrathikkara =

Muthurathnakkara or Muthrathikara is a village situated in the parapukkara panchayath in Irinjalakkuda block in Thrissur district in the Indian state of Kerala.
