= VTK (disambiguation) =

VTK is an open-source software system for 3D computer graphics, image processing and visualization.

VTK may also refer to:

- VTK (file format), of the software
- Vallathol Nagar railway station
- Vasgyári Testgyakorlók Köre, an abbreviation used for Hungarian sports clubs such as Diósgyőri VTK
- Vendhu Thanindhathu Kaadu, a 2022 Tamil film
- Vostok Aviation Company
- VTK, tractor models of David Brown Ltd.
