= M. Subhadra Nair =

Indian gynecologist

- Born: 21 January 1929 (age 97); Irinjalakuda, Thrissur, Kerala, India
- Occupations: Gynecologist, social worker
- Spouse: Gopalakrishnan Nair
- Children: Asha Nair; Shanthi Nair
- Parent(s): Krishnan Kutty Menon; Madhavi Amma
- Awards: Padma Shri

M. Subhadra Nair is an Indian gynaecologist, medical teacher and social worker, reportedly credited to have assisted over 50,000 child births. The Government of India honoured her, in 2014, with the Padma Shri, the fourth highest civilian award, for her services to the field of medicine, the first gynaecologist to receive the Padma award.

== Biography ==
"It feels great to be recognised, but I am not overjoyed", says Dr. Subhadra Nair, on the Padma Shree award

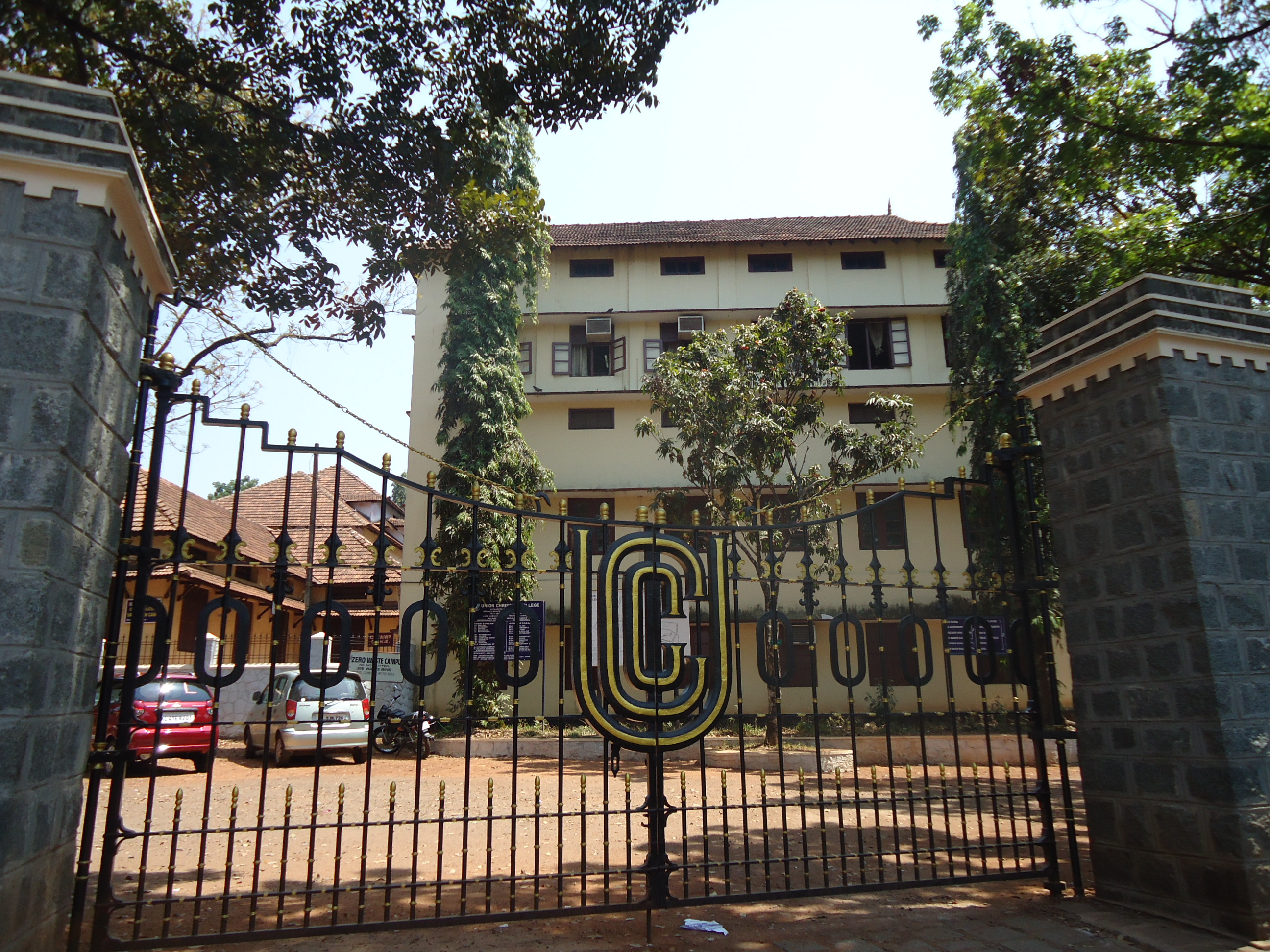
U C College Aluva

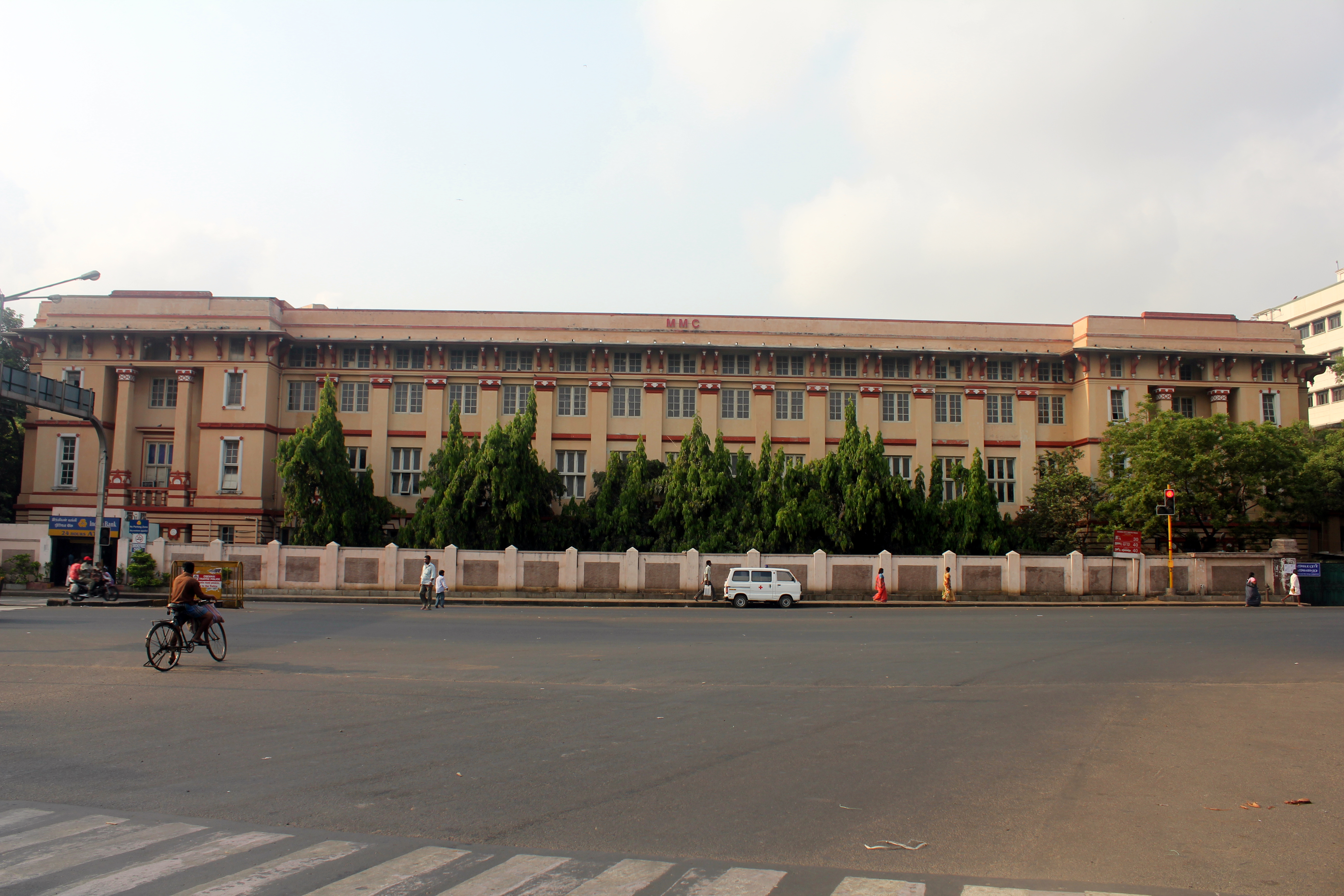
Madras Medical College

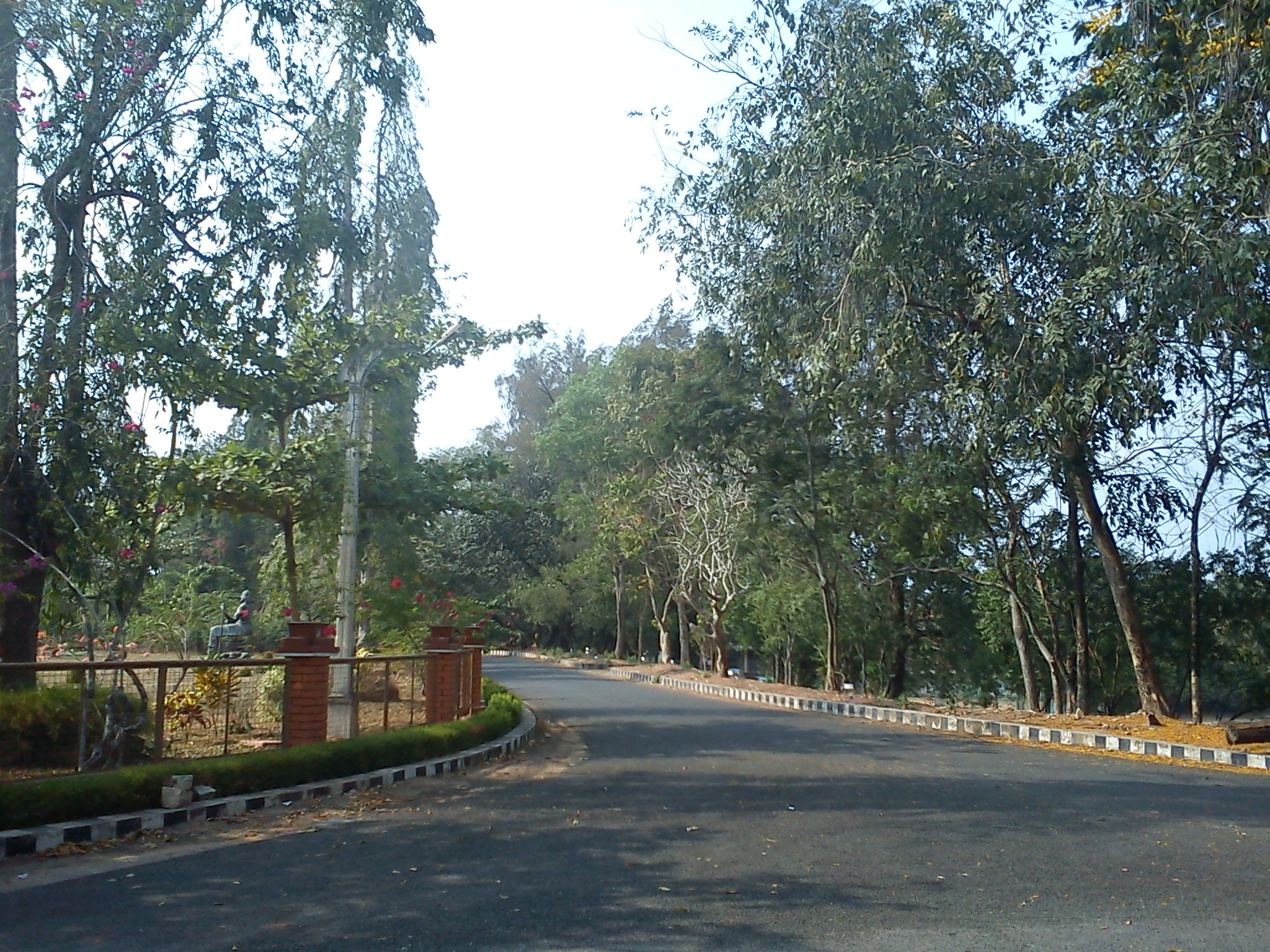
Thiruvananthapuram Medical College Campus

Subhadra Nair was born on 21 February 1929 at Irinjalakuda, Thrissur, in the south Indian state of Kerala to Krishnan Kutty Menon and Madhavi Amma, one of the pioneer lady doctors in India, as the sister of two elder brothers and one elder sister. Madhavi Amma, a follower of Mahatma Gandhi and a freedom fighter, was a strict disciplinarian and a busy doctor dues to which the young Subhadra was brought up by her maternal aunt.

Subhadra started her schooling at an early age of 3 at the local school in Irinjalakuda and passed matriculation before she turned 14. Madras University, under which Irinjalakuda fell, had minimum age requirement for college studies and Subhadara, being under age, had to move to Travancore University area for college studies. As such, she joined Union Christian College, Aluva and passed the Pre University Course. Again, age prevented her to join a medical course directly, which only Madras University offered and Subhadra joined Maharajas College, Ernakulam to complete her BSc degree.

The medical career of her mother had influenced Subhadra and she had already made up her mind to pursue a career in medicine. Accordingly, in 1947, she moved to Madras, where her eldest brother, Vishwanatha Menon was already a practising diabetologist, to join Madras Medical College from where she passed her MBBS. Though she had opportunities to start medical practice in Madras, along with her brother, Subhadra decided against it and returned to Kerala.

Her career started as the assistant surgeon at the Sree Avittam Thirunal Hospital for women and children in Thiruvananthapuram, part of the Government Medical College, Thiruvananthapuram which was in its infancy at that time. As the Medical College grew, Subhadra joined the faculty as a tutor. To further her teaching career, which required a post graduate degree to enter the mainstream teaching profession, she secured a postgraduate degree with specialisation in gynecology and obstetrics from Patna and Madras universities and soon rose up the ranks. Subhadra Nair retired from the Government service in 1984, as the Head of the Department of Gynecology and Obstetrics.

Nair was married to Gopalakrishnan Nair, a district superintendent with the Kerala Police, who has since died leaving behind two daughters, Asha Nair and Shanthi Nair. Asha Nair is settled in the UK while the younger daughter remains in Thiruvananthapuram. After retiring from the government service, Subhadra joined Cosmopolitan Hospital, Thiruvananthapuram as consultant surgeon of gynecology, when the hospital was a small-time setup. The hospital has now developed into a multi-speciality hospital.

Subhadra Nair lives in Pattom, Thiruvananthapuram, continuing her work as the chairman and the senior consultant of gynecology at the Cosmopolitan Hospital.

== Career graph ==
- Assistant surgeon – Sree Avittam Thirunal hospital for women and children
- Tutor – Government Medical College, Thiruvananthapuram
- Lecturer – Government Medical College, Thiruvananthapuram
- Assistant professor – Government Medical College, Thiruvananthapuram
- Professor – Government Medical College, Thiruvananthapuram
- Director and head of the Department of Gynecology – Government Medical College, Thiruvananthapuram
- Consultant surgeon – Cosmopolitan Hospital, Thiruvananthapuram
- Senior consultant surgeon – Cosmopolitan Hospital, Thiruvananthapuram
- Chairman – Cosmopolitan Hospital, Thiruvananthapuram

== Social service ==
After retirement from government service, Subhadra Nair started working with Abhaya, a charitable organisation engaged in the support service to destitute people. Later, she was attracted to the activities of the Sri Sathya Sai Orphanage Trust, an NGO operating in Thiruvananthapuram and started devoting her attention to the social activities of the Trust.

At Sai Trust, she, along with the founding members, were able to set up a Saigramam, a village to provide shelter and support to the needy. Subhadra, personally stood guarantee for obtaining a bank loan for the construction of the village. The project has since grown to provide social, educational and medical support to a large section of people through Sainiketan (Children's home), Sayoojyam (Old age home), Sathya Sai Vidya Mandir (School), Sai Narayanalayam (Public kitchen), Navajeevanam Free Dialysis Unit and Sai Care Home (centre for differently gifted people). The organisation claims they have provided over 200,000 free dialysis to people from financially poor background

Subhadra, a trustee of the Saigramam from its inception, is serving as its acting chairperson. She frequently gives lectures on the subject of gynaecology at various platforms. She has also been involved in the publication of a book on infertility.

- M.D. Jayakrishnan K. (Author), M. Subhadra Nair (Foreword) (February 2012). Insights into Infertility Management. Jaypee Brothers Medical Pub. p. 280. ISBN 978-9350255186.

== Awards and recognitions ==
- Padma Shri – Government of India – 2014
- Fellowship – Commonwealth
- Fellowship – World Health Organization

== Controversy ==
In 1990, Shibu Thomas and Geetha Shibu Thomas, parents of Baby Naveen, approached the Kerala State Consumer Disputes Redressal Commission alleging medical negligence on the part of the Cosmopolitan Hospital and the doctors. Baby Naveen was reported to have sustained Birth asphyxia (lack of oxygen), which consequently resulted in Hypoxic-ischemic encephalopathy, but, the commission dismissed the petition citing lack of evidence. The petitioners approached the National Consumer Disputes Redressal Commission with an appeal against the state body's verdict on which the appellate authority allowed a compensation of ₹ 1.35 million with interest, to be paid jointly by the hospital and the doctors. Subhadra, who had to pay approximately ₹500,000, however, maintained that there was no negligence on the part of the doctors.
