= Kallamkunnu =

- town
- Location in Kerala, India
- Coordinates: 10°19′11″N 76°13′51″E
- Country: India
- State: Kerala
- District: Thrissur

Languages
  - Official: Malayalam, English
- Time zone: UTC+5:30 (IST)
- Vehicle registration: KL-

Kallamkunnu is a town in Kerala, India. It is the second-largest town in Nadavaramba and 15th-largest in Irinjalakuda. It is in the Thrissur district. The postal pin code is 680503.

With an estimated population of 3000 in 2007, it is the principal Ward of the Velukkara Panchayath Area, a region about 500 residents projected to reach 700 between 2010 and 2012.

The Kallamkunnu Service Bank is in the town.

== Education ==
St. Sebastians Church is located in the town.
