= Vallakkunnu =

- village
- Location in Kerala, India
- Coordinates: 10°20′30″N 76°15′52″E
- Country: India
- State: Kerala
- District: Thrissur

Government
  - Type: Ward
  - Body: Aloor Panchayat

Languages
  - Official: Malayalam, English
- Time zone: UTC+5:30 (IST)
- PIN: 680683
- Telephone code: 0480
- Taluk: Chalakudy
- Lok Sabha constituency: Thrissur
- Assembly constituency: Irinjalakuda

Vallakkunnu is a small village in Aloor Gramapanchayath in the state of Kerala, India. It has a population of around 600 families. The village also holds a portion of Muriyad wetland system, a part of Thrissur kole wet lands.

== Demographics ==
The population is 35% Hindu and 65% Christian. One or two members from 50% of families are away from the village, working in foreign countries. The people of Vallakkunnu are well educated; the average education of those under 50 years of age is 12th standard.

== Geography ==
Vallakkunnu is in Aloor Gramapanchayath and is a residential area surrounded by paddy fields in all sides. Potta-Munnupedika State Highway 61 passes through middle of the village. It is 7 km from National Highway 544 and 15 km from National Highway 66 with good connectivity via public and private transport to Irinjalakuda, Kodakara and Chalakudy. The nearest railway station is Irinjalakuda railway station1.5 km away and Cochin International Airport is 32 km away. All express and passenger trains except super-fast trains stop here.

== Notable people ==
- K. Mohandas (Ex M.P Mukundapuram constituency)

== Places of worship ==
- St. Alphonsa's Church (established 12-10-2008): located in the middle of the village and is a parish in the Irinjalakuda diocese. It is the world's first church in the name of Saint Alphonsa. It was built in just 72 days. It became a parish on 27 June 2009.
- St. Joseph's Kappela (established 2008)
- Tooyath Bhagavathi Temple: on the south side of the village.

== Educational institutions ==
- Snehodaya College of Nursing (established 2012)
- Anganwadi: part of Integrated Child Development Services

== Others ==
- Paulalayam (established 1979): a convent of the congregation of the Samaritan Sisters
- Co-operative bank: branch of Kallettumkara service co-operative bank with automated teller machines
- Neethi medical store and laboratory facility
- BSNL Telephone Exchange
