= Edavilangu =

Edavilangu Pathinettarayalam
- village
- Location in Kerala, India Edavilangu (India)
- Coordinates: 10°14′30″N 76°10′0″E
- Country: India
- State: Kerala
- District: Thrissur

Languages
  - Official: Malayalam, English
- Time zone: UTC+5:30 (IST)
- PIN: 680671
- Telephone code: 0480
- Vehicle registration: KL-47, KL-8
- Nearest city: Kodungallur
- Lok Sabha constituency: Chalakudi
- Climate: Tropical monsoon (Köppen)
- Avg. summer temperature: 35 °C (95 °F)
- Avg. winter temperature: 20 °C (68 °F)

Edavilangu is a village in Kodungallur, in Thrissur district, Kerala, India, 5 kilometres from the main town of the Taluk, Kodungallur, and 38 kilometres from the main city of the district, Thrissur. The pin code for Edavilangu is 680671. To the west of Edavilangu is the Arabian Sea.
