= Little Flower Convent Higher Secondary School, Irinjalakuda =

L. F. C. H. S. S., Irinjalakuda

Location
- Thrissur; Irinjalakuda, Kerala; India; 10.347°N 76.2145°E

Information
- Type: Government aided Higher Secondary School
- Established: March 1923; 103 years ago
- School board: Kerala State Education Board
- Principal: Sr. Florence CMC
- Faculty: 150+
- Grades: K.G, 1-12
- Enrollment: 3000+
- Education system: State syllabus
- Language: Malayalam, English
- Campus: 6 buildings
- Website: www.littlefloweririnjalakuda.com/lfchsshome.php

Little Flower Convent Higher Secondary School in Irinjalakuda, in the Kerala state of India, was established by the sisters of the Congregation of Mother of Carmel (C.M.C). in 1923. It is the oldest and largest educational institution in Irinjalakuda. It is the largest congregation of sisters founded by Blessed Chavara Kuriyakose Elias. It is a government aided English and Malayalam-medium school. The school started with lower primary and high school. Later in 2003, higher secondary section was also added to it. It began as a Malayalam-medium school and an English-medium was added later on. The school is primarily for girls and boys are allowed until fourth grade. The school is going to open a new branch in Bathinda, Punjab. The construction work has been started and soon it will be benefited for the students of bathinda.

== Notable alumni ==
- Innocent, MP and Malayalam cinema actor

== Principals ==
- Sr. Florence CMC (a.k.a. Sr. Lilly Paul. P) 2010–present
- Sr. Ann Maria (a.k.a. Sr. Kochumariam K.A) 2006 - 2010
- Sr. Deepthi (a.k.a. Sr. Anna.K.K) 2004 - 2006
- Sr. Merceena (a.k.a. Sr. Achama A.L) 2001 - 2004
- Sr. Josrita (a.k.a. Sr. Reethamma T.K.) 1995 - 2001
- Sr. Mercy 1984 - 1995
- Sr. Mary Justin 1978 - 1984
- Sr. Clarissa 1971 - 1978
- Sr. Abraham 1969 - 1971
- Sr. Domittila 1965 - 1969
- Sr. Celin 1935 - 1965
