= Thazhekkad, Irinjalakkuda =

Thazhekkad
- village
- Country: India
- State: Kerala
- District: Thrissur

Population (2011)
  - Total: 13,241

Languages
  - Official: Malayalam, English
- Time zone: UTC+5:30 (IST)
- PIN: 680683
- Vehicle registration: KL-
- Nearest city: Thrissur and Kochi

Thazhekkad is a village in Thrissur district in the state of Kerala, India.

== Demographics ==
As of 2011 India census, Thazhekkad had a population of 13241 with 6220 males and 7021 females.

== Transportation ==
The nearest railway station is Irinjalakuda, situated at Kallettumkara.
