= S. N. H. S. S., Irinjalakuda =

Location
- Thrissur; Irinjalakuda, Kerala; India; 10°21′31″N 76°13′3″E

Information
- Type: Government Aided
- Established: October 1966
- School board: Kerala State Education Board
- Faculty: 50+
- Grades: 1-12
- Enrollment: 1000+
- Language: Malayalam, English
- Website: www.snhss.com

S. N. H. S. S., Irinjalakuda, a school in Kattungachira, Irinjalakuda, in the Kerala state of India, was established by the Late Shri C.R. Keshavan Vaidyar and managed by the Chandrika Educational Trust. It was established in October 1966. A Teacher's Training Institute was established on 29 April 1963 before the school and it was attached to the school later. It is one of the oldest Schools in Irinjalakuda. A total of 49 batches have completed in the past 50 years. The higher secondary section was added in the year 1991.
