= Mullurkara railway station =

Railway station in Kerala, India

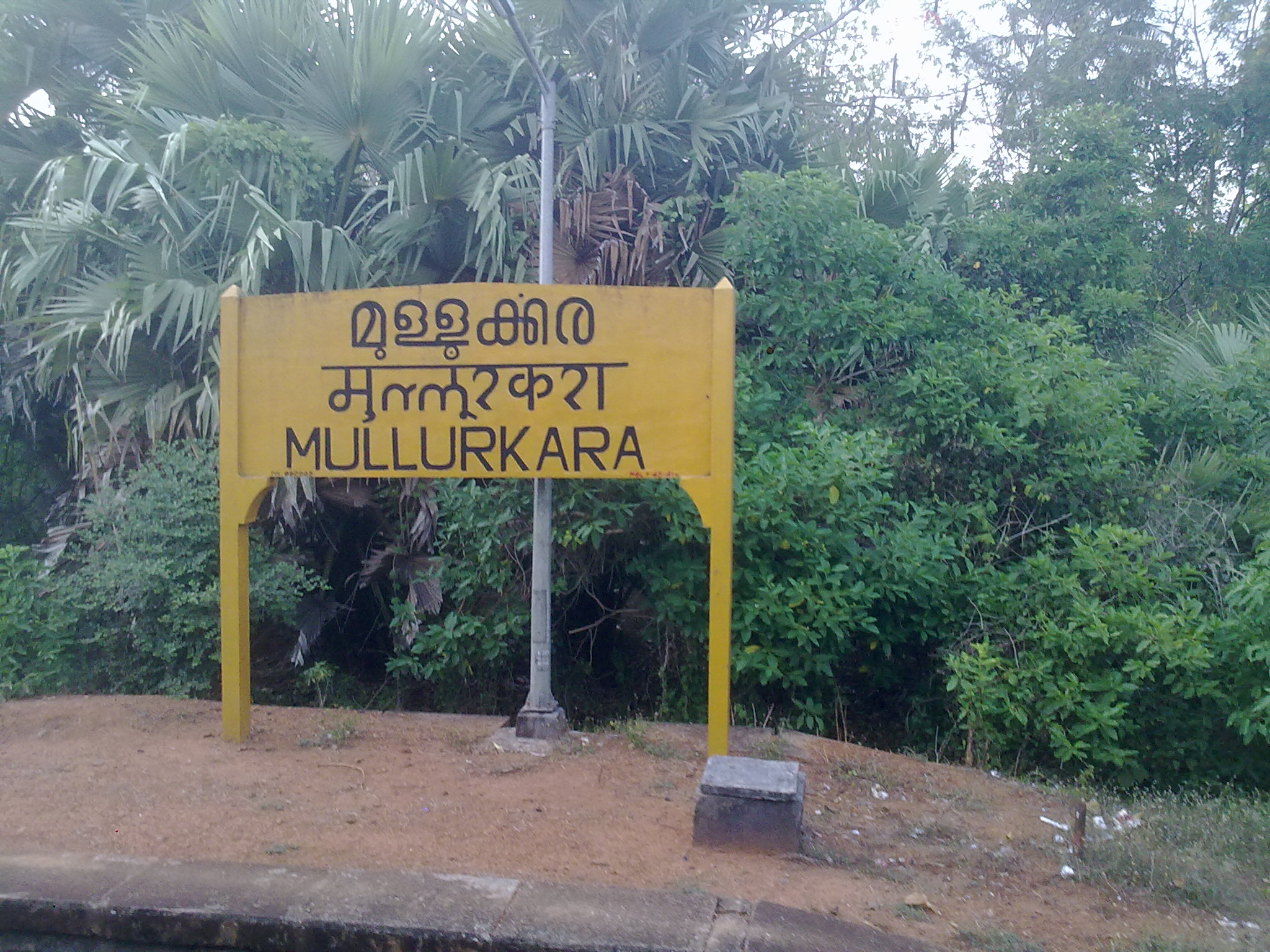
- Name board of Mullurkara railway station

General information
- Location: Mullurkara, Thrissur district, Kerala, India
- Coordinates: 10.7061°N 76.2717°E
- System: Indian Railways station
- Owner: Indian Railways
- Line: 2
- Platforms: 2

Other information
- Station code: MUC
- Fare zone: Southern Railway

Services
Preceding station	Indian Railways	Following station
Vallathol Nagar towards Shoranur Junction	Southern Railway zone Shoranur–Cochin Harbour section	Wadakkanchery towards Cochin Harbour Terminus
Location
- Location within India Location within Kerala

Mullurkara railway station (Station Code: MUC) falls between Vallathol Nagar railway station and Wadakkanchery railway station in the busy Shoranur–Cochin Harbour section in Thrissur district. Mullurkara railway station is operated by the Chennai-headquartered Southern Railways of the Indian Railways. All passenger trains stop here.
