= Mapranam =

- Suburb

Government
  - Body: Irinjalakuda municipality

Languages
  - Official: Malayalam, English
- Time zone: UTC+5:30 (IST)

Mapranam is a village in Irinjalakuda. It is under the municipality of the district of Thrissur, in the state of Kerala, India. It is a predominantly residential zone with facilities such as grocery stores, schools, medical clinics, libraries, and temples, churches and mosques.
