= Orumanayur =

Orumanayur Orumanayoor
- village
- Location in Kerala, India Orumanayur (India)
- Coordinates: 10°33′30″N 76°2′5″E
- Country: India
- State: Kerala
- District: Trichur

Population (2011)
  - Total: 14,064

Languages
  - Official: Malayalam, English
- Time zone: UTC+5:30 (IST)
- PIN: 680512
- Telephone code: 0487
- Vehicle registration: KL-
- Nearest city: Chavakkad
- Lok Sabha constituency: Thrissur
- Vidhan Sabha constituency: Guruvayur

Orumanayur is a village in Thrissur district in the state of Kerala, India.

== Demographics ==
As of 2011 India census, Orumanayur had a population of 14,064 with 6,243 males and 7,821 females. The village has an area code of 0487.
