= Devamatha CMI Public School =

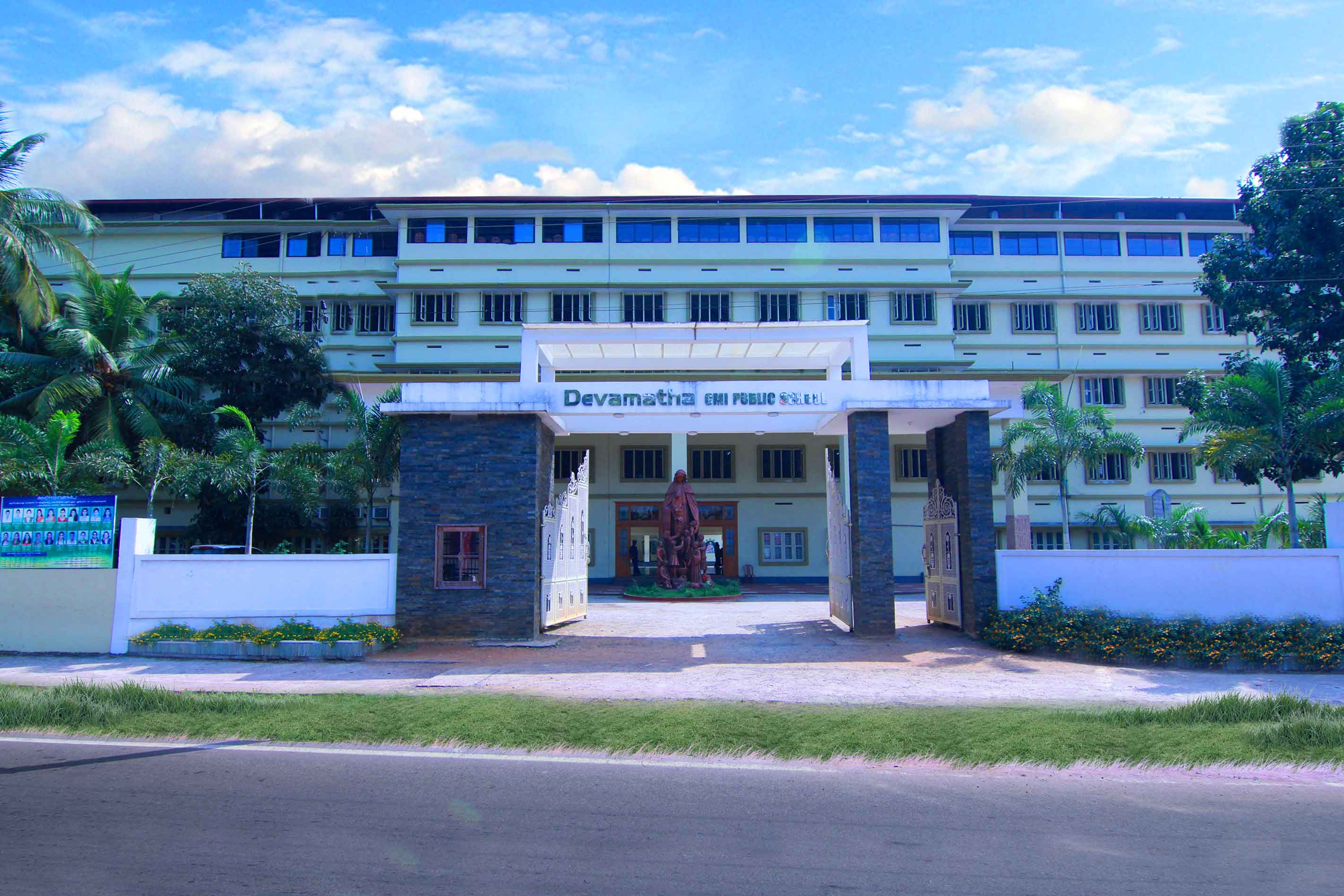

Location
- Patturaikkal; Thrissur, Kerala; India; 10.5395°N 76.213°E

Information
- Type: International School, CBSE
- Motto: Jesus grew in wisdom, stature and in favour with god and man
- Established: 1995
- School board: Central Board of Secondary Education
- School district: Thrissur
- Principal: Fr Joice Elavathingal
- Campus type: Urban
- Website: www.devamatha.com

Devamatha CMI Public School is a co-educational private run Carmelites of Mary Immaculate (C.M.I.) school situated in Thrissur city of Kerala, India. The school is affiliated to the Central Board of Secondary Education, Delhi.

The school is headed by Fr. Davis Panackal CMI.The Principal of the School is Fr. Joice Elavathingal CMI.

== Notable alumni ==
- Aparna Balamurali, Indian Film Actress
- Nihal Sarin, Indian Chess Grandmaster and Prodigy
- Milen Manoj Earath, Indian Pianist
- Priyamvada Krishnan, Indian Film Actress
