= Irinjalakuda =

- Municipal Council
- Irinjalakuda
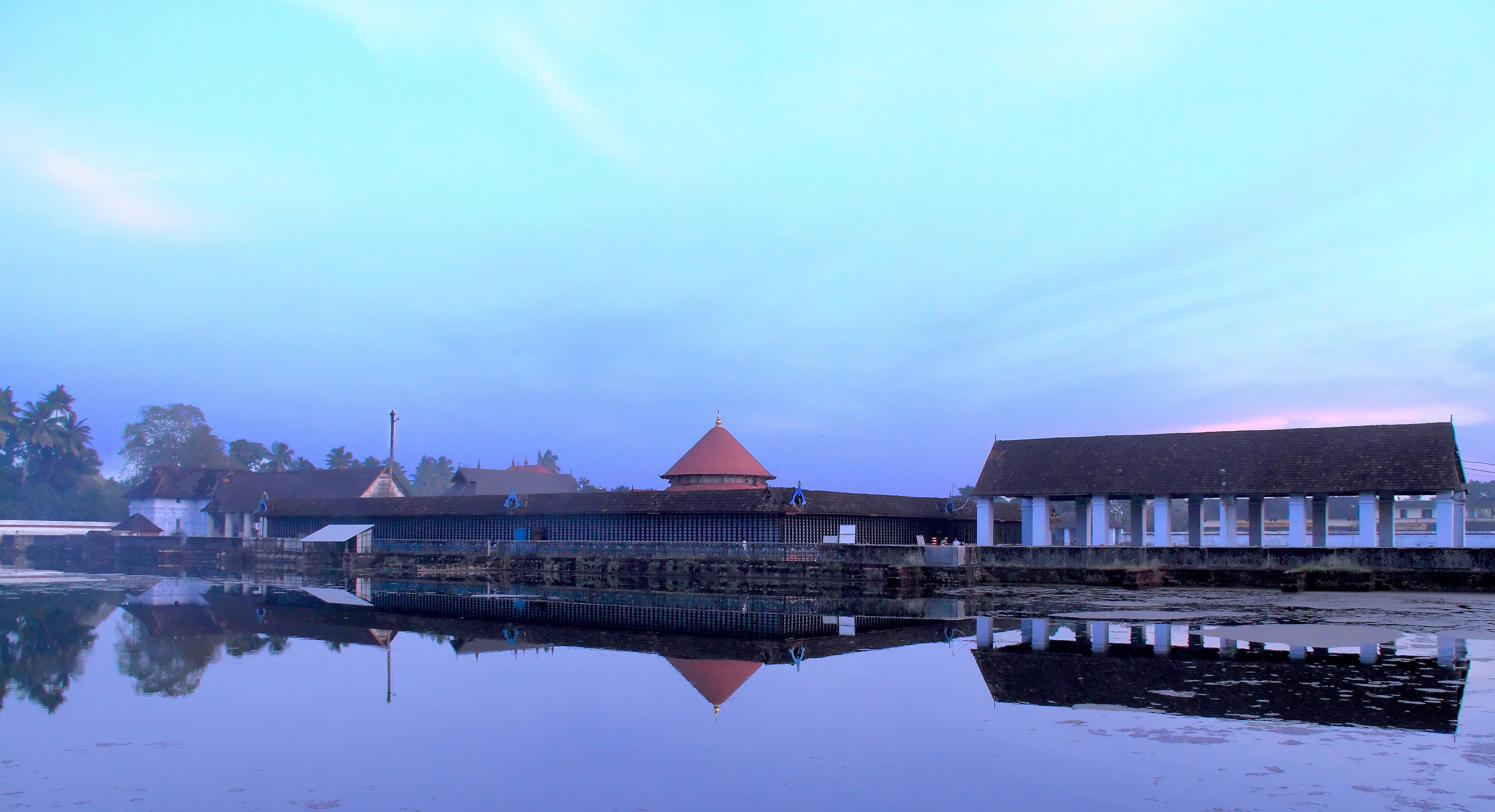
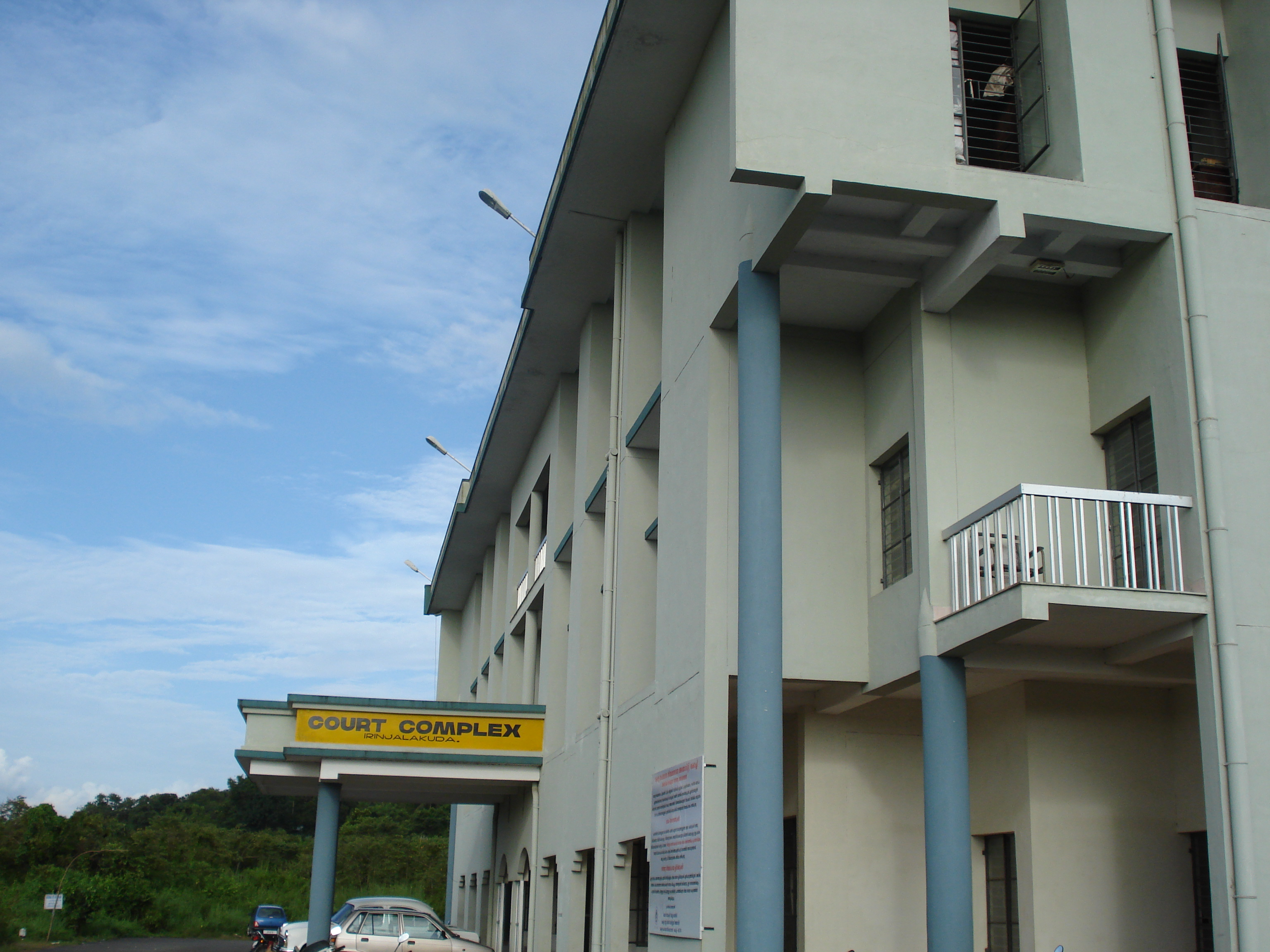
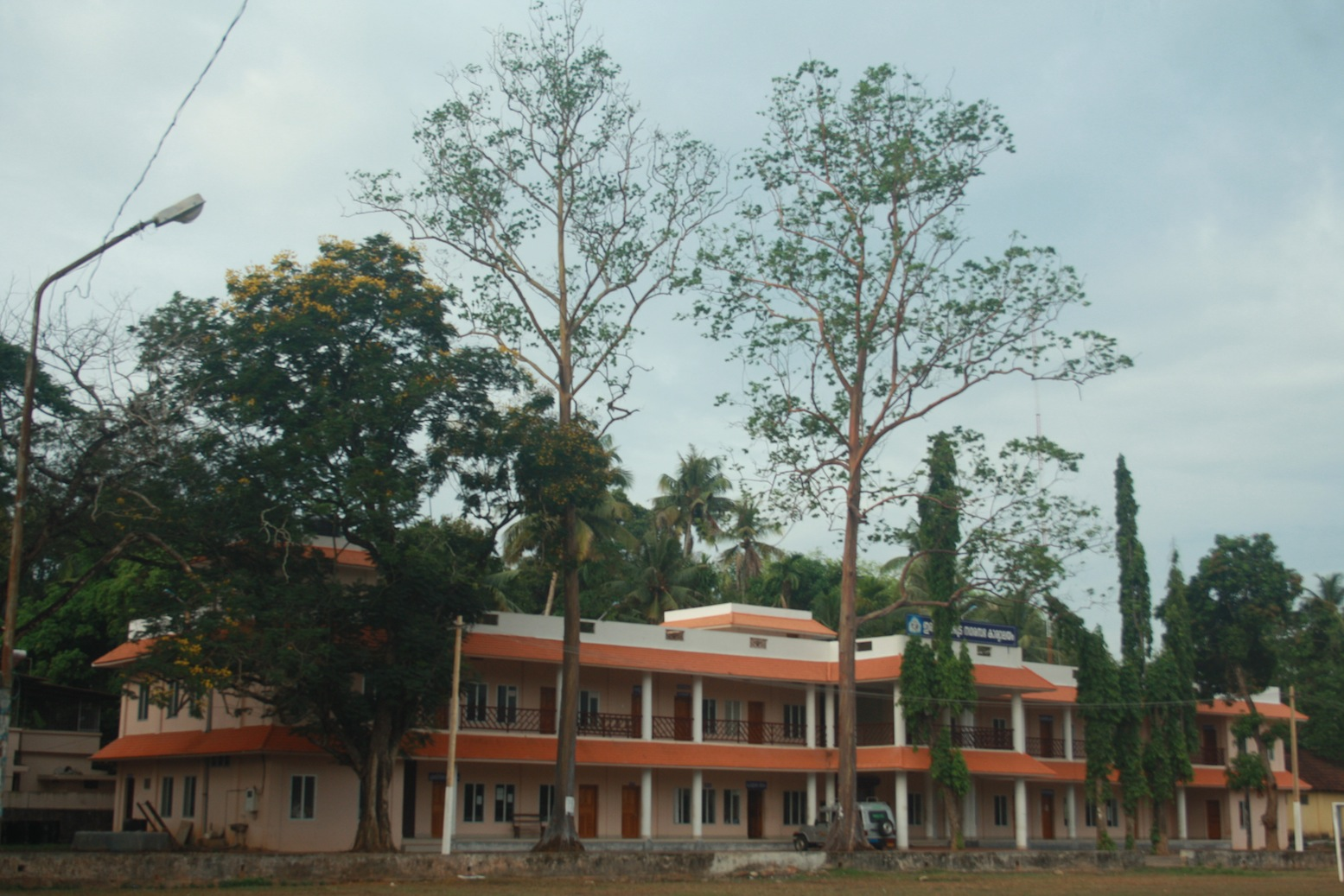
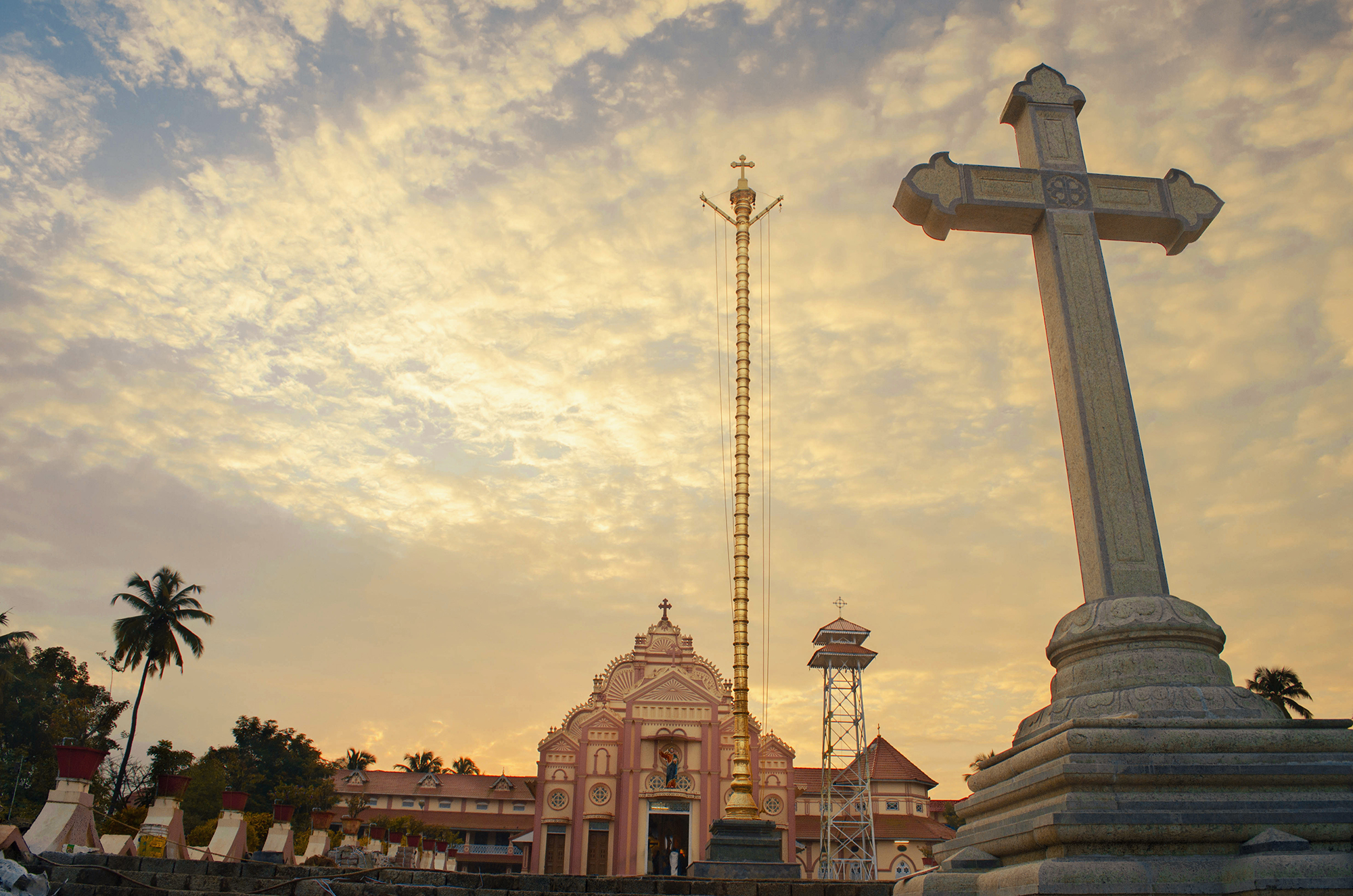
- Clockwise from top: Koodalmanikyam Temple, Irinjalakuda Municipal Office, St. Thomas Cathedral, Civil Station
- Nickname: Varadanangalude Nadu
- Location in Kerala, India Irinjalakuda (India)
- Coordinates: 10.33°N 76.23°E
- Country: India
- State: Kerala
- District: Thrissur
- Municipality: 1936

Government
  - Type: Municipality
  - Body: Irinjalakuda Municipal Council
  - Chairman: M.P Jackson

Area
  - Total: 33.57 km^{2} (12.96 sq mi)
- Elevation: 39 m (128 ft)

Population (2011; after amalgamation with neighbouring Porathissery Grama Panchayath)
  - Total: 62,521
  - Density: 1,862/km^{2} (4,824/sq mi)

Languages
  - Official: Malayalam, English
- Time zone: UTC+5:30 (IST)
- PIN: 680 121, 680 122, 680 125, 680 711, 680 712
- Telephone code: 0480
- Vehicle registration: KL-45
- Website: village.kerala.gov.in/Office_websites/indexor.php?nm=1248Irinjalakudavillageoffice

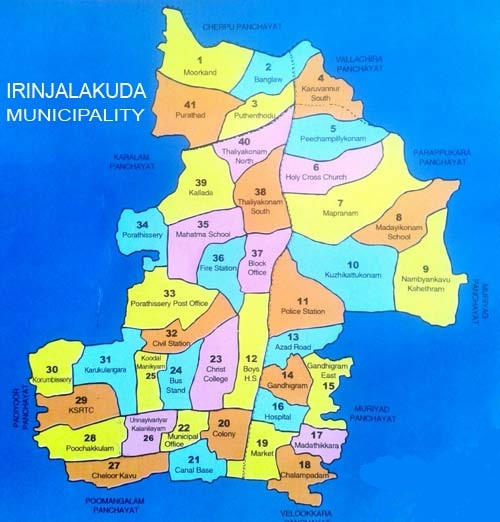
Irinjalakuda Municipality Map

Irinjalakuda is a municipal town in Thrissur district, Kerala, India. It is the headquarters of Irinjalakuda Revenue Division, Thrissur Rural Police and Mukundapuram Taluk. After Thrissur, this town has most number of administrative, law-enforcement, and judicial offices in the district. The place is well known for Koodalmanikyam Temple and the Thachudaya Kaimals, who had princely status until 1971. The earliest recorded history of this temples date back to the ninth century of Common Era (CE).

== Etymology ==
The name Irinjalakuda has been derived from "Iru" and "Chaal", meaning two streams. According to another legend, the origin of the name Irinjalakuda came from 'Irinjalikoodal'. 'Koodal' simply means merge, merging of two rivers. So it shows that Irinjalakuda may have gradually developed, from 'Irinjalikoodal', which derived from 'Inangikoodal', which means merge. At present there is no river in Irinjalakuda, only the myth of the river.

Irinjalakuda can be derived from 'iru njyaala koda' (ഇരുഞാലകൊട) i.e., donation of two worlds, which is what Mahabali is said to have done in the story of the Vaamanaavataaram.

Another origin story for the name refers to the play on words "Virinja Alin Kuda" which translates to "An umbrella formed by the branches of the Banyan tree", a reference to the banyan tree which is a prominent landmark in the heart of Irinjalakuda

== Mythological history and legends ==
According to Hindu mythology, Irinjalakuda was created by sage Parashurama. According to Keralolpatthi, Irinjalakuda was the head of some of the 64 gramas (village governing bodies) established in Kerala. (32 Malayala gramas and Thulu half-grama Manjeswaram in present-day Kerala, and 31 1/2 Thulu gramas in coastal Karnataka.) Irinjalakuda was one of the most prominent among these gramas (village societies). Boundaries of this grama extend up to Aloor in the east and Kakkathuruthi in the west and later extended to Koodapuzha in the east. Like the other gramas, this grama also followed Sankara Smruthi (a modified form of the 'Chathurvarnia' system of society with some Kerala model variations which lay upon caste system based on the 'Manusmruthi').

Another legend suggests that the origin of the name Irinjalakuda were traditionally associated as "Irunnu Salayil Koodai" and "Virinja Alu Kuda". A huge Banyan tree still stands in the centre of the Irinjalakuda, spreading its branches to the sky like an umbrella.

The Thachudaya Kaimal is a spiritual dignitary of Kerala Hindus and the temporal ruler of the Koodalmanikyam Temple and its Estates. The line goes back into antiquity and is mentioned in the Skanda Purana. The Arms of the Kaimal and that of the temple bear the insignia of a coiled conch shell with the words 'Manikkam Keralar'. With the 26th amendment of the Indian constitution in 1971, the Princely order in India was abolished and the Thachudaya Kaimals lost their position in the temple and its estates. It is now managed by a Trust managed by the District Collector although a vestige of former power lies in his being the chief trustee of the temple.

The Devaswom was allotted land to accommodate institutions such as the Christ College, and for public use to facilitate development activities in the region. Much land that belonged to Koodalmanikyam was subjected to encroachment.

== Recorded history ==
The following text is a translation of the scholarly work titled 'Koodalmanikyam Temple and Kerala Society':

The Iringalakuda temple is centuries old, regardless of the oral stories. The stone inscriptions found inside the temple are proof of this. The inscriptions on two stones lying on the north side of the temple shrine were noticed by the authorities and in nineteen forties they were placed on the western wall of the temple and preserved. The Malayalam script text of these documents was published in the Bulletin of the Ramavarma Institute Volume IX Part 1 and became an authoritative proof of the temple's antiquity. Today there are two inscriptions on the walls of the temple namely Sthanuravi Inscription and Bhaskaranambiranar Inscription. The Sthanuravi inscription was written in the 11th regnal year of Cheraman Perumal. It is estimated to be common year 854. This inscription consists of twelve lines. Many of the letters have faded away as people have stepped on them for a long time

The second record, the Bhaskaranambiranar record, dates back to the 10th century. It is believed to have been written between 950 and 1000 AD. There are nineteen lines in this inscription. It can be assumed that the letters have not faded much compared to the first inscription. In this inscription, the deity of Kudalmanikya is described as 'Thiruvirungadi Kudal Thiruvadi'.

Two similar words irangadi(kkuta) and irangadikudal are found in both the inscriptions respectively. It is only that the epithet Thiru has been added in the second inscription. It is clear from this that the name Iringalakuda came from this old place name and the deity here was described as 'Thiruviringadikudal Thiruvadi' as early as the 10th century.

There are those who argue that it can be understood from this record that it had already become a Brahminical temple in the 10th century AD. There is also a belief that this temple was a Jain center before it became a Brahminical temple. One of the major temples nearby, Trikanamatilakam, was a Jain center.

Some suggest that the Koodalmanikya is an idol of the Jain Tirthankara Bharateshvara in the Digabara form. They believe that the temple became a Brahminical center as part of the Hindu revival in the 8th century. In Manipravala's work 'Kokilasandesa', it is mentioned that women were not allowed to enter the Koodalmanikyam temple. There are those who read in connection with this remark the fact that women are not admitted in Jain temples. Thachudayakaimal, the last ruler of the temple, has refuted this claim.

Place name scholars say that the word Iringa in Iringalakuda refers to the Jain centre. Additionally, V.V.K. asserts that people refer to the two-storeyed Jain temples as 'koodam'. Historians such as Wallat point these facts out.

== Later History ==
In 1762, Maharaja Kingdom of Cochin formed Mukundapuram taluk by adding Mapranam nadu and parts of Nandilathu nadu to Mukundapuram nadu (Muriyanadu). In the last decade of the 18th Century, the last Naduvazhi Nambiar of Mukundapuram nadu (Murija nadu) died and Sakthan Thampuran confiscated all the powers and properties of Mukundapuram Nambiar and Mapranam Nambiar. Sakthan Thampuran divided old Mukundapuram Taluk into six properties: 1) Thazhekkad 2) Areepalam, 3) Mukundapuram (Nadavarambu) 4) Mapranam 5) Palathungal (Nandikkara) 6) Puthukkad for administrative and revenue purposes. Five more properties were added to Mukundapuram Taluk afterward: Kodassery (Chalakudy), Thirumukkulam (Kuzhur), Koratty (Adur), Pathinettarayalam (Edavilangu). and Malayattoor. Tipu Sultan's Army was based at Thazhekkad Property of Mukundapuram Taluk on 24 December 1789 to attack the Nedumkotta which is situated in the middle of Kochi Kingdom and was known as Travancore lines and attacked KonurKottavathil in January 1790.

When new Chalakudy taluk was formed in 2013 by bifurcating Mukundapuram taluk, it lost more than 50% of its territory.

== Culture ==
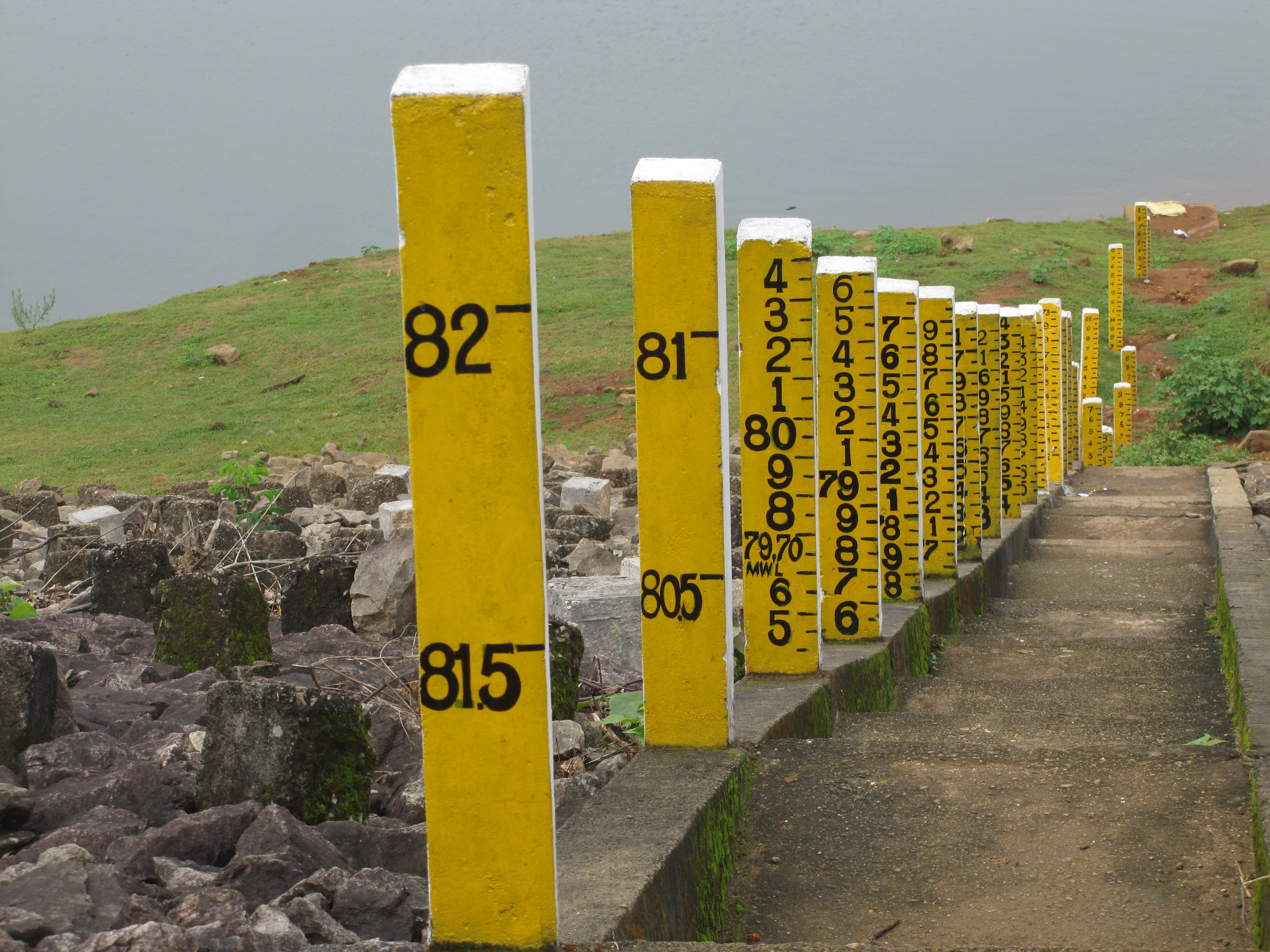
Chimmini Wildlife Sanctuary

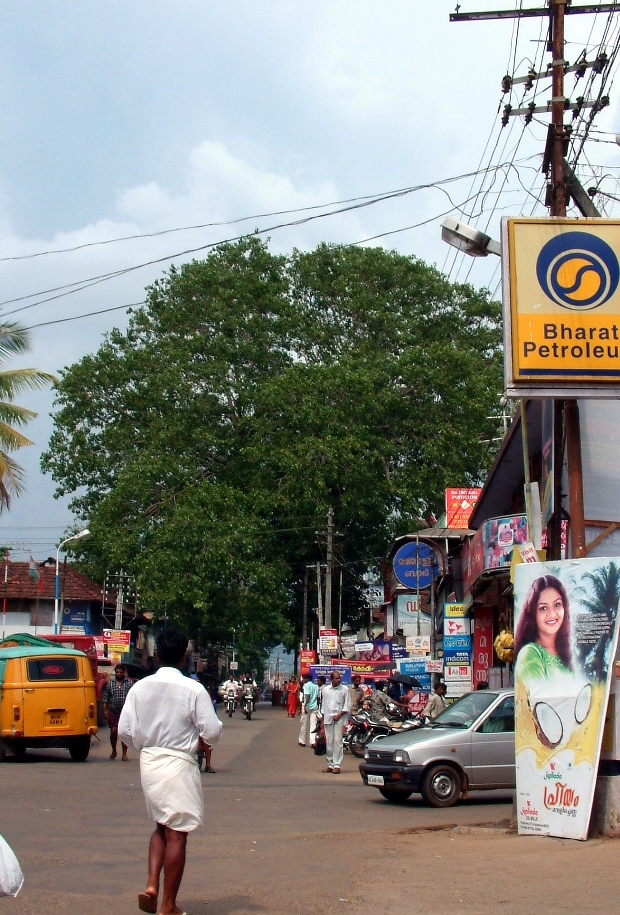

Irinjalakuda has a rich cultural history associated with the UNESCO-recognised classical dance form Koodiyattam.

Natanakairali - Research Training and Performing Centre for Traditional Arts, Irinjalakuda, is a prominent institution that imparts training on this ancient art form. Government-aided Unnayi Warrier Smaraka Kalanilayam near Koodalmanikyam temple trains artists in Kathakali. The town also has other institutions that give training on classical dance forms and theatre arts. Walden Pond House is another cultural space in the town where artists and movie makers gather for workshops and movie shoots.

== Entertainment ==
There are a number of good cinema halls in the town. JK Cinemas with two screens (Located in Kizhuthani), Chembakassery Movies with three screens, MAS Movies with two screens and Varna Cinemas with a single screen (Mapranam) are the major theatres in the town. Besides this, the town often hosts various cultural programmes organised by socio-cultural organisations.

== Population ==
=== Demographics ===
As of 2011 India census, Irinjalakuda had a population of 28,741. With the amalgamation of Porathissery Panchayath with the municipality, the total population has crossed 50,000. Males constitute 48% of the population and females 52%. Irinjalakuda has an average literacy rate of 96% which is much higher than the national average of 74.65%. While male literacy stands at 97.12%, female literacy is 94.56%. 10% of the population is under 6 years of age.

=== Religion ===
Its St. Thomas Cathedral is the episcopal see of the Syro-Malabar Catholic Eparchy of Irinjalakuda (Chaldean = Syro-Oriental Rite).

Before the arrival of Tipu Sulthan to Mukundapuram Taluk in December 1789 the headquarters of Padruado Archbishops of Cranganore (Kodungallur) of Nazranis (Padruado faction of Syro Malabar Catholic Church) was at Pookkatt (Aripalam). (See Varthamanapusthakam of Paremmakkal Thoma Kathanar, Gobernador and ArchaDeacon of late eighteenth century). Sakthan Thampuran brought four Christian families for improving commerce and trade to the place known as ‘Chanthappura’. When they struck gold in this field, more of this community migrated from Kombara chantha and settled in the area and now it became one of the strongholds of this community. Besides Hindu and Christian communities this area consists of Muslims. Karukulangara Narasimhaswamy Temple, Irinjalakuda, north west side, about 1.5 km from the Irinjalakuda municipal bus stand, a famous and oldest temple of Irinjalakuda

== Governance ==
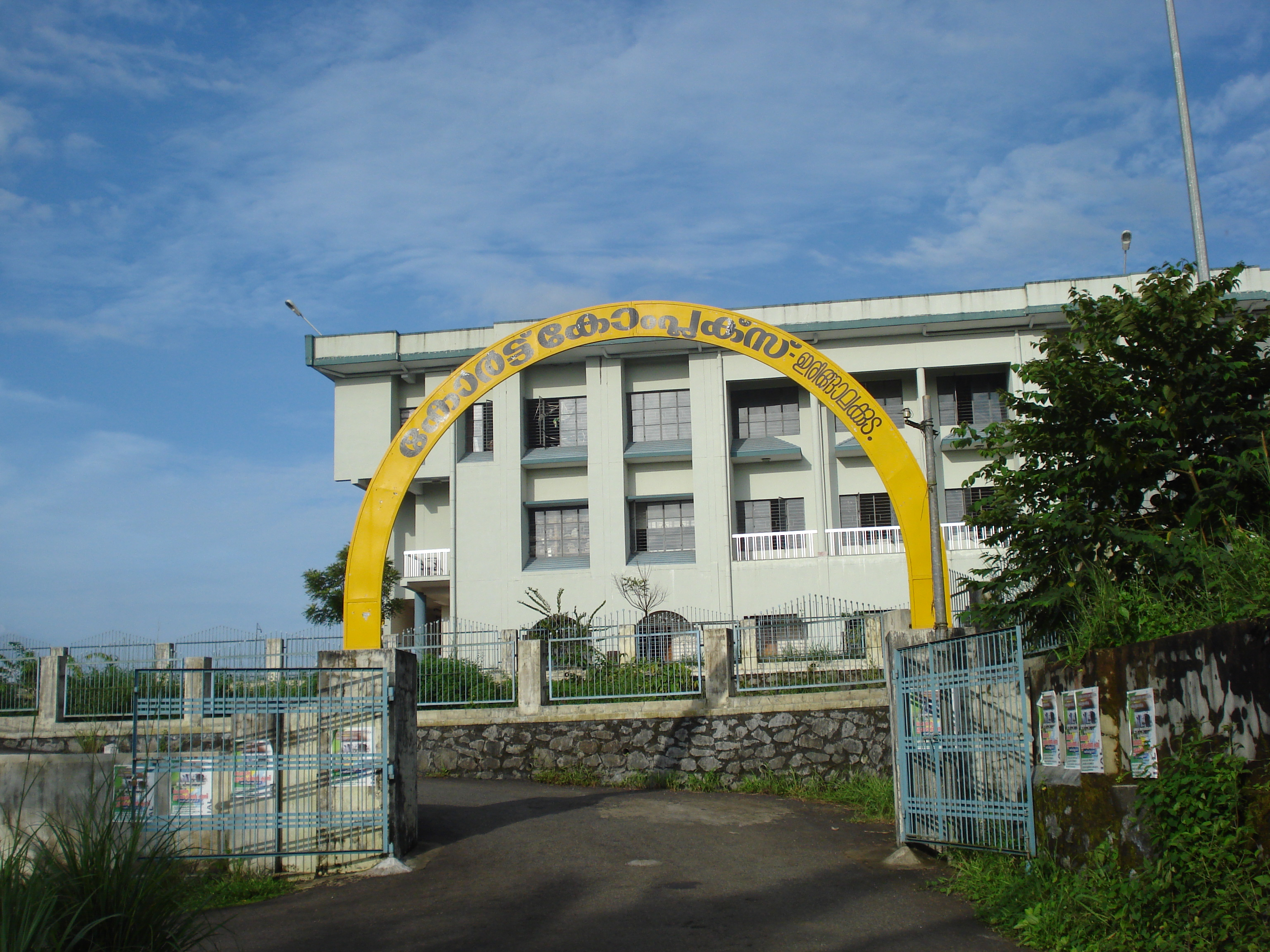
Irinjalakuda Court Complex

Irinjalakuda is governed by Irinjalakuda Municipality. The municipality was formed on 8 February 1936 with an area of 11.24 square kilometres. K.I. Varunny was the first municipal chairman and the municipality was divided into 22 electoral wards. Now, the Municipality has 43 wards. Irinjalakuda is the headquarters of the Mukundapuram Taluk and is a Grade-I municipality. Irinjalakuda Revenue Division was formed in May 2018. It is headed by a Revenue Divisional Officer (RDO) of the rank of deputy collector. The office is situated in the Mini Civil Station Annexe building. The revenue division comprises Mukundapuram, Chalakudy and Kodungallur taluks.

As the second-most important administrative town in the district, Irinjalakuda houses a large number of government offices, most of them situated at the mini civil station and its annex buildings near Porathissery.

Irinjalakuda Courts & Judicial Offices

- Additional District and Sessions Court/ Motor Accident Claims Tribunal
- Family Court
- Fast Track Special Court (POCSO cases)
- Principal Sub Court/Principal Assistant Sessions Court/Commercial Court -I
- Additional Sub Court/Additional Assistant Sessions Court/Commercial Court- II
- Judicial First Class Magistrate Court-1
- Principal Munsif Court/Judicial First Class Magistrate Court-3
- Additional Munsif Court/Judicial First Class Magistrate Court-2
- Taluk Legal Services Committee
- Mediation Sub Centre
- Office of the Additional Public Prosecutor cum Government Pleader

A new judicial complex is under construction near the civil station to house all judicial offices in the town.

Irinjalakuda has a special sub jail, which is functioning near the civil station complex. A land tribunal to provide land deeds and to dispose of land transfer disputes is functioning at the civil station. The tribunal started functioning in 2019.

The chairperson of the municipality is Smt Sonia Giri. The MLA of the Irinjalakuda legislative constituency is Adv Thomas Unniyadan. Irinjalakuda assembly constituency was a part of Mukundapuram (Lok Sabha constituency) till 2009 Lonappan Nambadan was the last Loksabha MP of Mukundapuram. From 2009, Irinjalakuda is now a part of Thrissur (Lok Sabha constituency).

The MP of Thrissur Lok Sabha constituency is Suresh Gopi.

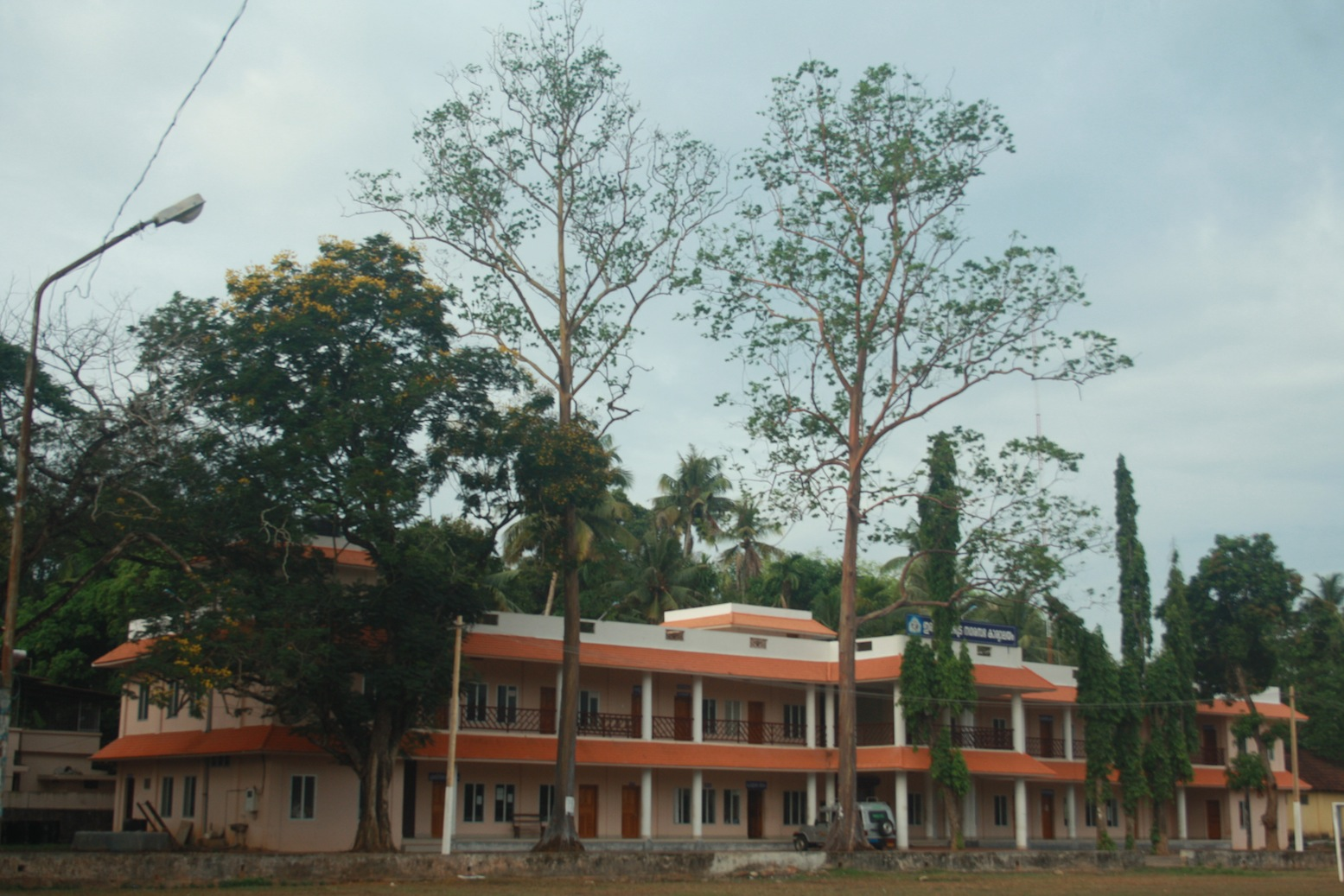
Irinjalakuda Municipal Office

Important government offices

- Revenue Divisional Office (RDO) /Sub Divisional Magistrate Court (SDM) /Maintenance Tribunal
- Mukundapuram Taluk office
- District Education Office
- Rural District Treasury
- KSEB Circle & Division offices
- KSEB Transmission Division & 110KV substation (being upgraded to 220KV)
- Transgrid Substation Subdivision
- Excise Circle and Range offices
- Postal Division office
- Head Post Office and State Speedpost Centre
- Water Authority PH Division
- State GST Tax Payers' Division Deputy Commissioner office and SGST Circle office
- State GST Audit Division Deputy Commissioner office
- Factories and Boilers division office
- Central Excise and Central GST Range office
- PWD Roads Subdivision
- PWD Buildings Subdivision
- PWD Special Buildings Section
- State Lottery Sub-office
- Land Tribunal office
- Koodal Manikyam Devaswam Board office
- Sub Registrar's office
- Cashew Workers Welfare Board Inspector office
- Headload Workers Welfare Board office
- Mukundapuram Sub Treasury
- Dairy Development office
- Labour office
- Sub Regional Transport office
- KSRTC Operating Centre
- Taluk Statistical office
- Taluk Industries office
- Taluk Welfare Office
- Assistant Registrar (General) & Assistant Director (Audit) of Cooperative Societies
- Assistant Director of Agriculture
- Agmark Laboratory
- Parasite Breeding Station
- Employees State Insurance Corporation
- Taluk Supply Office
- Minor Irrigation Sub Division
- BSNL Sub Division
- Legal Metrology
- Employment Exchange
- Irinjalakuda Block office
- Irinjalakuda, Manavalassery, Porathissery, Madayikkonam Village offices
- Veterinary Poly Clinic
- Sub-district Water Quality Testing Laboratory
- Government Textbook Depot
- Food Safety Circle office

Besides, most nationalised banks, new generation private banks, and old private-sector banks have branches in Irininjalakuda. Both South Indian Bank and Federal Bank have their regional offices here. State Bank of India's (SBI) Irinjalakuda regional office is housed in Thrissur.

Police offices

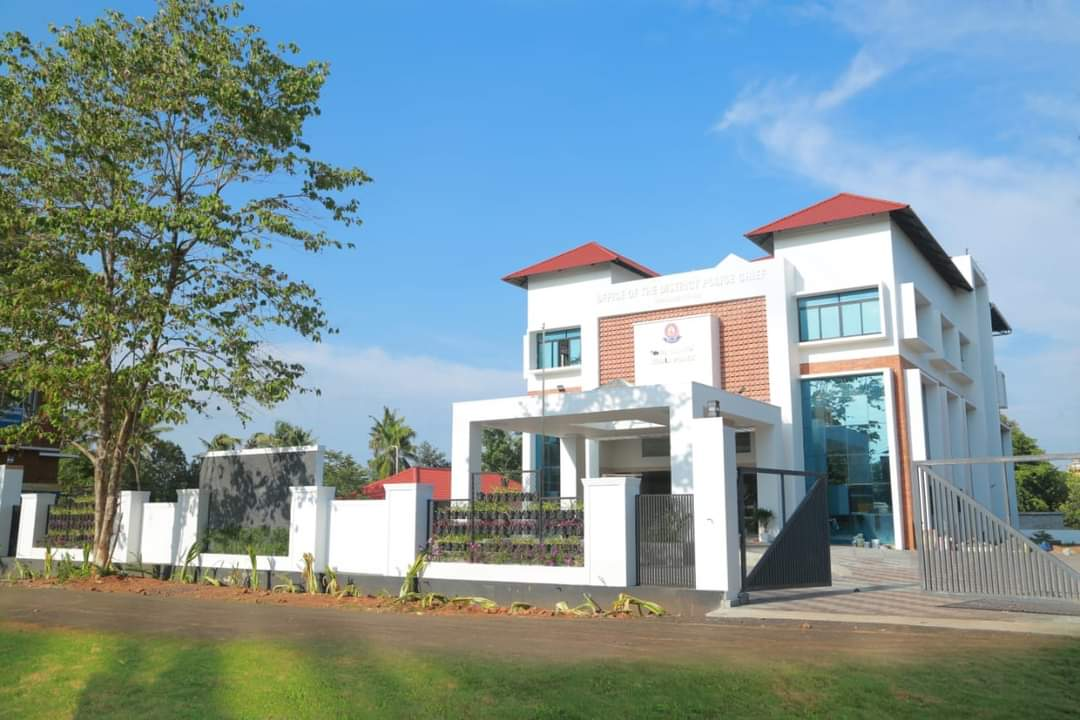
Thrissur Rural Police headquarters, Irinjalakuda

- Thrissur Rural Police headquarters
- Superintendent of Police office
- Additional SP office
- DYSP Crime Branch office
- DYSP Special Branch Office
- DYSP Crime Records Bureau
- Irinjalakuda DYSP office
- Irinjalakuda Police Station
- Subdivisional Police Training Centre
- Thrissur Rural Vanitha Police Station
- Thrissur Rural Cyber Crime Police Station
- Thrissur Rural Command and Control Centre
- Thrissur Rural Dog Squad
- Thrissur Rural District Forensic Science Laboratory
- Thrissur Rural Emergency Response Support System (ERSS)
- Thrissur Rural HOPE

Thrissur Rural Police office started functioning at Irinjalakuda on 14 May 2023. It was inaugurated by Kerala Chief Minister Pinarayi Vijayan.

== Transportation ==
=== Road ===
Irinjalakuda is located on State Highway 22, which links to major national highways NH 544, which is located around 16km from the town, and NH 66, which is located around 9km away, in the State. Two major roads State Highway 22 (Kodungallur-Shornur) and State Highway 61 (Potta-Moonupeedika) criss-crosses Irinjalakuda town. Besides, several MDRs (Major District Roads) connect the town with villages in the interior parts of the western and eastern sides of the town. These include Irinjalakuda-Kattoor road, Irinjalakuda-Porathissery Road, Mapranam-Nandhikkara road and Mapranam Karalam road.

KSRTC bus station is situated behind the Koodalmanikyam temple. KSRTC bus services are available to state capital Trivandrum, Ernakulam/Vyttila Hub, Kottayam, Kollam, Kozhikode, Palakkad, Mananthavady, Sulthan Bathery, Perinthalmanna, Mysore, Bangalore and Coimbatore. Besides, plenty of private buses are available from Irinjalakuda to various places within the district and towns in neighbouring districts. For those travelling from southern parts of the state, Chalakudy is the major roadhead to proceed towards Irinjalakuda. Private buses frequently ply between Chalakudy and Irinjalakuda. For travellers from northern Kerala, buses are available from Thrissur Shakthan Thampuran private bus stand.

=== Railways ===
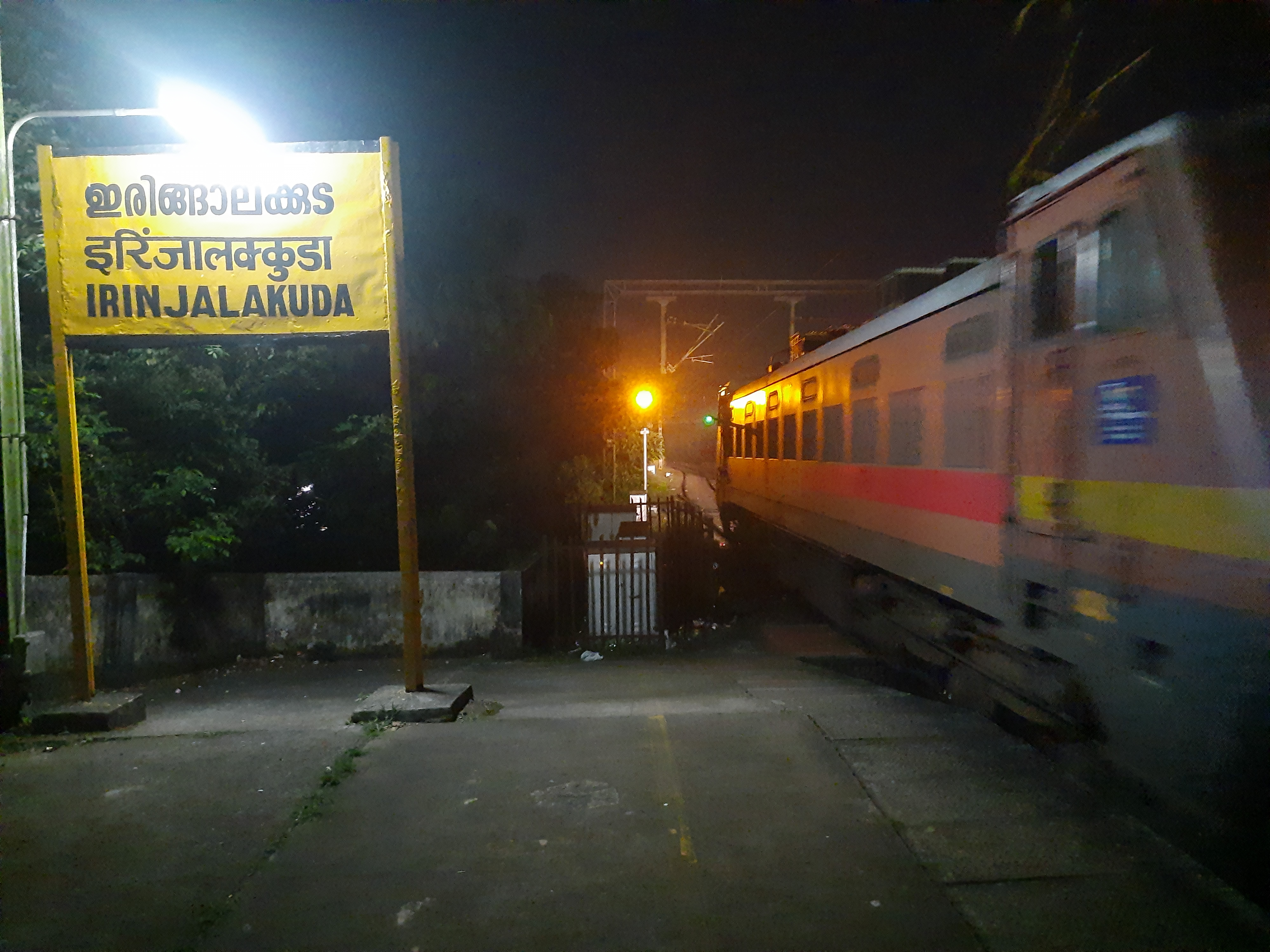
Irinjalakuda railway station

The nearest railway station is the Irinjalakuda Railway Station which is about 8 km east of the town at Kallettumkara. Irinjalakuda Railway Station is managed by the Southern Railway of Indian Railways. A total of 44 trains, including superfast, express and passenger trains, have stoppage here. Thrissur railway station is the nearest major railhead with stop for all trains, which is just 22 km from Irinjalakuda.

Trains are available from Irinjalakuda to Chennai, Bengaluru, Pune, Visakhapatnam, Mangaluru, Tiruchirapalli, Coimbatore, Madurai, Trivandrum, Kozhikode, Vijayawada, Nagpur, Tirupati/Renigunta, Warangal, Salem, Lucknow, Bhopal, Kanpur, Gorakhpur, Baruni, Raipur, Indore and Bilaspur.

=== Nearest Airport ===
The nearest airport is the Cochin International Airport at Nedumbassery, which is 38 km away from the town and 30km from the railway station. The airport is well connected to all major airports in India and also connected to many foreign cities. Direct flights are available to Chennai, New Delhi, Mumbai, Bangalore, and Kolkata.

== Healthcare ==
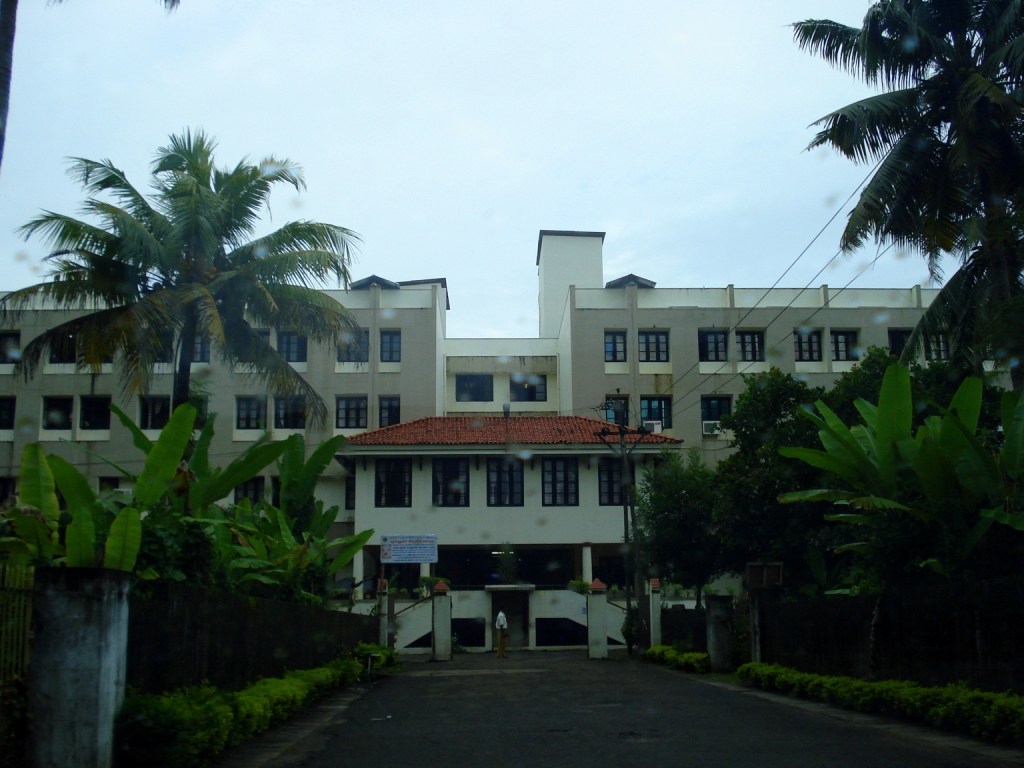
Irinjalakuda Co-operative Hospital

Irinjalakuda has several hospitals and health clinics. Most important among them are Government General Hospital (Tana), Irinjalakuda Cooperative Hospital (Nadavaramba), Lal Memorial Hospital (Mapranam), Sacred Heart Mission Hospital (Pullur), Government Ayurveda Hospital (AKP Junction), St. Vincent Diabetes Hospital & Research Centre Irinjalakuda and Marina Hospital (Tana). Another prominent healthcare facility is the National Institute of Physical Medicine and Rehabilitation (NIPMR) at Kallettumakara.

== Educational organizations ==
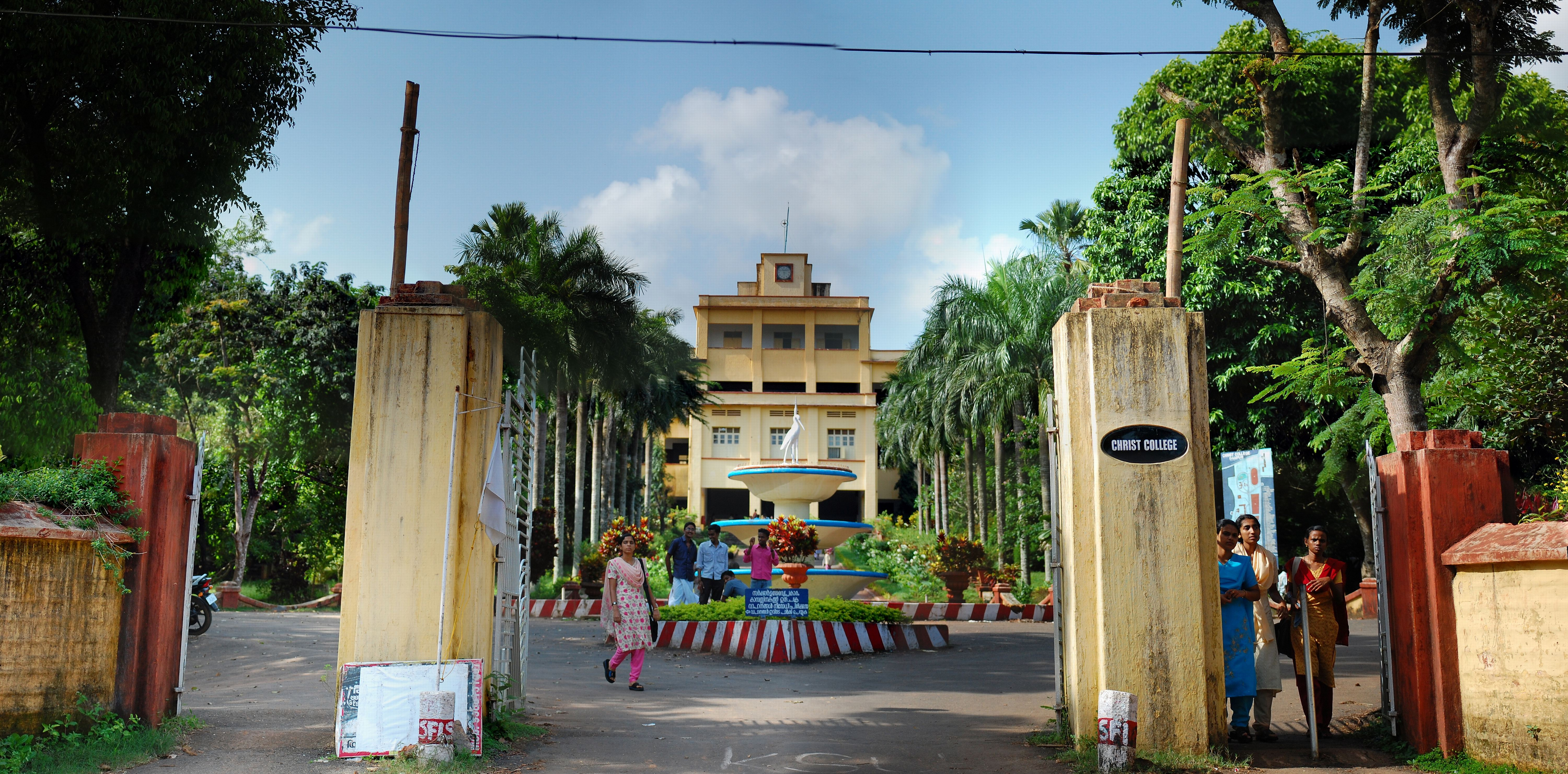
Christ College

Between the 14th and 16th Century, it was a center of learning. Kerala school of astronomy and mathematics which was believed to be founded here, made major contributions in Algebra, Arithmetic, Astronomy, Calculus, Geometry, Infinite Series, and Linguistics. St. Joseph’s College, Irinjalakuda is the only institution in Kerala offering government aided B.Sc. Biotechnology course.

Colleges

- Christ College, Irinjalakuda
  - Christ College of Engineering, Irinjalakuda
  - Christ College of Physical Education, Irinjalakuda
- St. Joseph's College, Irinjalakuda
- Tharananellur College of Arts and Science, Thanissery
- Universal College of Engineering, Vallivattom

STATE

- Don Bosco Higher Secondary School, Irinjalakuda
- Little Flower Convent Higher Secondary School, Irinjalakuda
- S. N. H. S. S., Irinjalakuda
- Govt Boys' Higher Secondary School, Irinjalakuda
- Govt Girls' Higher Secondary School, Irinjalakuda
- National Higher Secondary School
- St Mary's Higher Secondary School,Irinjalakuda

CBSE

- Santhinikethan Public School, Irinjalakuda

ICSE

- Christ Vidya Nikethan
- DON Bosco Central School (ICSE)

== Notable people ==
Irinjalakuda has been the home of many notable people, including

- Anand (born 1936), writer
- Edavela Babu (born 1963), actor
- Dr. R. Bindu, politician and Minister in the Government of Kerala
- O. Chandrashekar (1935-2021), footballer
- Innocent (1948-2023), actor, film producer, writer and politician
- P. Jayachandran (1944-2025), playback singer and actor
- Madhava of Sangamagrama (c. 1340 – c. 1425), mathematician and astronomer
- Dr. M. Subhadra Nair (born 1929), gynaecologist, medical teacher and social worker
- Anupama Parameswaran (born 1996), actress
- James Pazhayattil (1934–2016) the Syro-Malabar Catholic hierarch, Bishop of Irinjalakuda,
- Dr. K. Radhakrishnan (born 1949), space scientist
- Jijoy Rajagopal (born 1976), film and theatre actor and academic
- K. V. Ramanadhan (1932-2023), children's literature writer
- K. Rekha (born 1975), short story writer and journalist
- Meenakshi Thampan (born 1941), politician
- Tovino Thomas (born 1989), actor and film producer
- Sidin Vadukut (born 1979) columnist, writer and blogger
- Govind Vasantha (born 1988), composer, singer, and violinist
- N. C. Vasanthakokilam (1919–1951), carnatic singer and actress
- Unnayi Variyar (17th/18th century), poet, writer and dramatist

== Industries ==
Irinjalakuda is a centre of agro industries. The town is home to Kerala Solvent Extractions Limited (KSE Limited), which is a prominent cattlefeed manufacturing company in south India. State-owned cattlefeed manufacturing company Kerala Feeds Limited is located at Kallettumkara, around 2 km away from Irinjalakuda railway station and 9 km away from Irinjalakuda town. Irinjalakuda has several coconut oil manufacturing companies, including KLF and KPL oil mills. The neighbourhood of Irinjalakuda is home to three cashew processing factories, located at Pullur, Muriyad, and Aloor. The town and its neighbouring areas also host a number of bellmetal manufacturing units.

== See also ==
- Avinissery
- Kallamkunnu
- Kodungallur
- Vallakkunnu
