= Vallathol Nagar railway station =

Railway station in Kerala, India

Vallathol Nagar
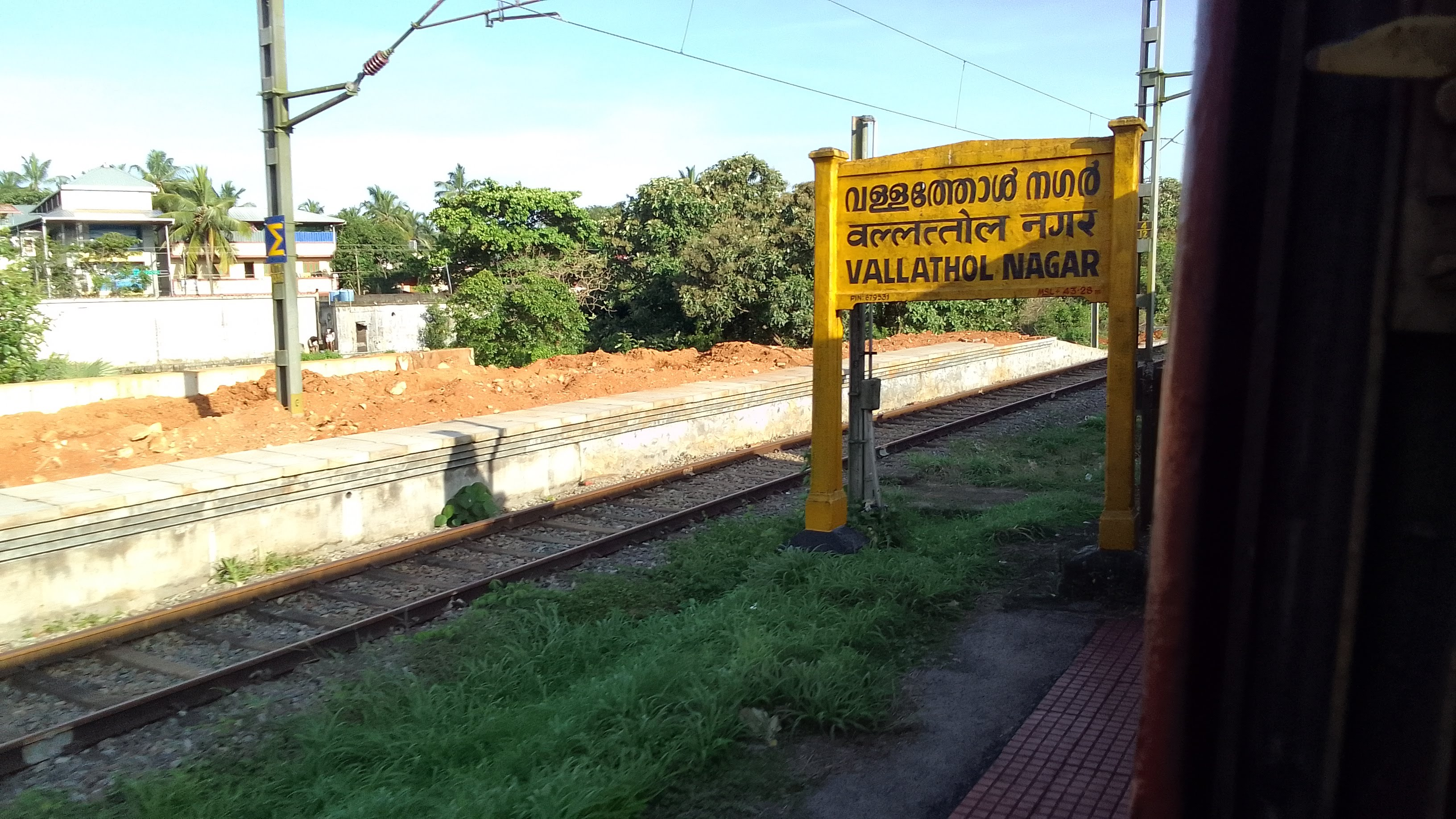
- Vallathol Nagar railway station

General information
- Coordinates: 10.7316°N 76.2813°E
- System: Regional rail and Light rail station
- Owner: Indian Railways
- Line: Shoranur–Cochin Harbour section
- Platforms: 2

Construction
- Parking: No

Other information
- Station code: VTK
- Fare zone: Southern Railway zone

Services
Preceding station	Indian Railways	Following station
Shoranur Junction Terminus	Southern Railway zone Shoranur–Cochin Harbour section	Mullurkara towards Cochin Harbour Terminus
Route map
Location
- Location within India Location within Kerala

Vallathol Nagar railway station (station code: VTK) is an NSG–6 category Indian railway station in Thiruvananthapuram railway division of Southern Railway zone. It falls between Shoranur Junction and Mullurkara railway station in the Shoranur–Cochin Harbour section of Thrissur district. It is the base station for Kerala Kalamandalam and last station in the Thiruvananthapuram railway division.

== History ==
The station is named after Vallathol Narayana Menon or popularly known as Mahakavi Vallathol, Kerala's greatest poet in Malayalam language. Vallathol Narayana Menon was instrumental in establishing the Kerala Kalamandalam in Cheruthuruthi, a major centre for learning Indian performing arts, especially those that developed in Kerala.
