= List of engineering colleges in Kerala =

The following is a list of Government, Aided, Government Cost Sharing and Private self-financing Engineering Colleges in the southwestern Indian state of Kerala.

All the engineering colleges in the state excluding Central Government engineering institutions and colleges under direct control of other universities are affiliated to the A P J Abdul Kalam Technological University (APJAKTU). There are 30 government controlled engineering colleges in the state (Including Govt, aided and government cost sharing ones).

== Central Government Engineering Colleges ==
Central Government Engineering Colleges
Serial no	Name	Short Name	Established	Location	Notes
1	National Institute of Technology Calicut	NITC	1961	Kozhikode	
2	ER&DCI Institute of Technology, Trivandrum	ER&DCI	2001	Trivandrum	
3	National Institute of Electronics & Information Technology, Calicut	NIELIT	2002	Kozhikode	
4	Indian Institute of Space Science and Technology, Trivandrum	IIST	2007	Trivandrum	
5	Indian Institute of Information Technology Kottayam	IIITK	2015	Kottayam	
6	Indian Institute of Technology Palakkad	IIT PKD	2015	Palakkad	
7	Indian Institute of Science Education and Research, Thiruvananthapuram	IISER-TVM	2008	Trivandrum	Offers dual degree courses(BS-MS) in Physics, Chemistry, Bioligy, Maths and Data Science
8	Sree Chitra Tirunal Institute for Medical Sciences and Technology, Trivandrum	SCTIMST	1976	Trivandrum	offers M.Tech in Clinical Engineering

== State Government Engineering Colleges ==
Government Engineering Colleges (Including Government-Aided) - Colleges Under Directorate of Technical Education, Govt of Kerala
Serial no	Name	Short Name	Established	Location	Notes
1	College of Engineering, Trivandrum	CET	1939	Trivandrum	
2	Government Engineering College, Thrissur	GECT	1957	Thrissur	
3	Thangal Kunju Musaliar College of Engineering, Kollam	TKMCE	1958	Kollam	
4	NSS College of Engineering, Palakkad	NSSCE	1960	Palakkad	
5	Mar Athanasius College of Engineering, Kothamangalam	MACE	1961	Kothamangalam, Ernakulam	
6	Government College of Engineering, Kannur	GCEK	1986	Kannur	
7	Rajiv Gandhi Institute of Technology, Kottayam	RIT	1991	Kottayam	
8	Government Engineering College, Sreekrishnapuram	GECSKP	1999	Sreekrishnapuram, Palakkad	
9	Government Engineering College, Trivandrum	GECB	1999	Barton Hill, Trivandrum	
10	Government Engineering College, Kozhikode	GECK	1999	Kozhikode	
11	Government Engineering College, Wayanad	GECW	1999	Mananthavady, Wayanad	
12	Government Engineering College, Idukki	GECI	2000	Idukki	

== Engineering Colleges Under Government Departments ==
Serial no	Name	Short Name	Established	Location	Department	Notes
1	Government Model Engineering College, Cochin	MEC	1989	Ernakulam	IHRD	
2	College of Engineering Chengannur	CEC	1993	Chengannur	IHRD	
3	L.B.S College of Engineering	LBSCE	1993	Kasaragod	LBSCET	
4	L B S Institute of Technology for Women, Poojappura, Trivandrum	LBSITW	2001	Trivandrum	LBSCET	
5	College of Engineering Attingal	CEAL	2004	Attingal	IHRD	
6	College of Engineering, Cherthala	CECTL	2004	Cherthala	IHRD	
7	College of Engineering, Kallooppara	CEKPR	2004	Kallooppara	IHRD	
8	College of Engineering, Karunagappally	CEK	1999	Karunagappally	IHRD	
9	College of Engineering, Kottarakkara	CEKRA	2004	Kottarakkara	IHRD	
10	College of Engineering, Poonjar	CEP	2000	Poonjar	IHRD	
11	College of Engineering, Aranmula	AEC	2014	Aranmula	CAPE	
12	College of Engineering, Kidangoor	CEKGR	2000	Kidangoor	CAPE	
13	College of Engineering & Management, Punnapra	CEMP	2008	Punnapra	CAPE	
14	College of Engineering, Pathanapuram	PEC	2011	Pathanapuram	CAPE	
15	College of Engineering, Perumon	PRN	2000	Perumon	CAPE	
16	College of Engineering, Thalassery	TLY	2000	Thalassery	CAPE	
17	College of Engineering, Thrikaripur	TKR	2000	Trikaripur	CAPE	
18	College of Engineering, Vatakara, Kozhikode	CEV	1999	Vatakara	CAPE	
19	College of Engineering Muttathara	CEMTR	2016	Muttathara	CAPE	
20	College of Engineering Munnar	CEM	2000	Munnar	IHRD	
21	College of Engineering, Adoor	CEA	1995	Adoor	IHRD	
22	Sree Chitra Thirunal College of Engineering	SCTCE	1995	Trivandrum	Government Transport Department	

== Engineering Colleges Under Universities ==
Serial no	Name	Short Name	Established	Location	University	Notes
1	School of Engineering, CUSAT	CUSAT	1979	Kochi	Cochin University of Science and Technology	
2	Cochin University College of Engineering Kuttanad	CUCEK	1999	Alappuzha	Cochin University of Science and Technology	
3	Calicut University Institute of Engineering & Technology, Tenchipalam	CUIET	2000	Tenhipalam	University of Calicut	
4	University College of Engineering, Kariavattom	UCEK	2000	Trivandrum	University of Kerala	Constituent College of the University of Kerala.
5	University College of Engineering, Thodupuzha	UCE	1996	Thodupuzha	MG University, Kottayam.	Managed by Centre for Professional and Advanced Studies (CPAS), affiliated to APJ Abdul Kalam Technological University.
6	Amrita School of Engineering, Amritapuri	SoE	2002	Kollam	Amrita Vishwa Vidyapeetham	Deemed to be University(Pvt)
7	Kelappaji College of Agricultural Engineering and Technology		1985	Tavanur	Kerala Agricultural University	

== Engineering Colleges Under Kerala Veterinary and Animal Sciences University ==
Serial no	Name	Short Name	Established	Location	Notes
1	College of Avian Sciences and Management			Thiruvazhamkunnu, Palakkad	
2	College of Dairy Science and Technology			Kolahalamedu, Idukki	
3	College of Dairy Science and Technology, Mannuthy, Thrissur		1993	Thrissur	
4	College of dairy science and technology			Trivandrum	
5	College of Food Technology			Thumburmuzhi, Chalakudy, Thrissur	
6	College of Veterinary and Animal Sciences			Pookode, Wayanad	
7	Kerala Veterinary College, Mannuthy			Mannuthy, Thrissur	

== Private Self-Financing Colleges ==
Engineering colleges were affiliated to various universities till 2014–15. From 2015 to 2016 all engineering colleges in Kerala state are affiliated to KTU.

Serial No	Code	Colleges	Address	Year of Establishment	Management	Notes
1	MHP	ACE College of Engineering	Thiruvallam, Trivandrum	2013	Manarul Huda Trust	
2	ASI	Adi Shankara Institute of Engineering Technology	Kalady, Ernakulam	2001	Adi Shankara Trust	
3	ATP	Ahalia School of Engineering and Technology	Kozhippara, Palakkad	2012	Ahalia International Foundation	
4	AAE	Al Azhar College of Engineering and Technology	Thodupuzha, Ernakulam	2010	Noorul Islam Trust Al-Azhar Group of Institutions	
5	AAP	Al-Ameen Engineering College	Shoranur, Palakkad	2003	Al-Ameen Educational Trust	
6	AIK	Albertian Institute of Science and Technology	Kalamassery, Ernakulam	2011	Edn & Chtrust of Archdiocese of Verapoly	
7	AJC	Amal Jyothi College of Engineering	Koovappally, Kottayam	2001	Diocesan Educational Trust	
8	AME	Ammini College of Engineering	Kannampariyaram, Palakkad	2010	Ammini Foundation	
9	ACE	Archana College of Engineering	Nooranad, Alappuzha	2009	Sri Mahalakshmi Educational Scientific & Ch. Trust	ceased
10	ANE	Aryanet Institute of Technology	Velikkad, Palakkad	2012	Aryanet Trust	ceased
11	AWH	AWH Engineering College	Kuttikkattoor, Kozhikode	2001	Association For Welfare of Handicapped	
12	AXE	Axis College of Engineering and Technology	Murikkingal, Thrissur	2010	Global Knowledge Foundation	
13	BMC	Baselios Mathews Ii College of Engineering	Sasthamcotta, Kollam	2002	Dr. C. T. Eapen Trust (Under Mosc)	
14	BTE	Baselios Thomas I Catholicose College of Engineering and Technology	Koothattukulam, Ernakulam	2011	Jacobite Syrian Christian Fellowship Trust (Jescf)	
15	CML	Believers Church Caarmel Engineering College	Perunad, Pathanamthitta	2002	Caarmel Educational Trust	
16	BJK	Bishop Jerome Institute	Fatima College Road, Kollam	2010	Bishope Jerome Foundation	
17	CMA	Carmel College of Engineering and Technology	Punnapra, Alappuzha	2014	SJC Educational and Charitable Trust of CMI	
18	CCE	Christ College of Engineering, Irinjalakuda	Irinjalakuda, Thrissur	2015	CMI Devamatha Province, Thrissur	
19	CKC	Christ Knowledge City	Muvattupuzha, Ernakulam	2010	Christ Educational Trust	
20	CCV	Cochin College of Engineering and Technology	Edayur, Malappuram	2012	World Wide Knowledge Foundation	
21	CIM	Cochin Institute of Science and Technology	Muvattupuzha, Ernakulam	2012	Cochin Foundation	
21	CEN	College of Engineering and Technology	Mathamangalam, Kannur	2011	National Educational and Charitable Foundation	
22	EKC	Eranad Knowledge City Technical Campus	Manjeri, Malappuram	2012	Al-Hind Educational and Charitable Trust	
23	FIT	Federal Institute of Science and Technology	Angamaly, Ernakulam	2002	Federal Bank Officers Associ. Edu. Society(Fboaes)	
24	FOP	College Of Engineering Poomala, FOP	Poomala, Thrissur	2014	Focus Foundation Educational & Charitable Trust	ceased
25	GIT	Gurudeva Institute of Science And Technology	Puthuppally, Kottayam	2010	Sndp Yogam, Kottayam	ceased
26	HCE	Heera College of Engineering and Technology	Nedumangad, Thriuvananthapuram	2010	Heera Educational and Charitable Trust	
27	HKE	Hindustan College of Engineering	Kulathupuzha, Kollam	2009	South East Education Trust	ceased
28	HGW	Holy Grace Academy of Engineering	Mala, Thrissur	2011	Holy Grace Foundation	
29	HKC	MGM College of Engineering & Technology (Holy Kings College of Engineering and Technology)	Muvattupuzha, Ernakulam	2011	Geevarghese Yohannan Charitable Trust & Noble Educational and Charitable Trust	
30	IES	IES College of Engineering	Chittilappilly, Thrissur	2003	Ideal Educational Society	
31	ICE	Ilahia College of Engineering Technology	Muvattupuzha, Ernakulam	2002	Ilahia Trust, Muvattupuzha	
32	ICT	Ilahia School of Science and Technology	Muvattupuzha, Ernakulam	2011	Ilahia Trust	
33	ILE	ILM College of Engineering and Technology	Perumbavoor, Ernakulam	2012	Islamic Learning Mission Trust	ceased
34	IGW	Indira Gandhi Institute of Engineering and Technology For Women	Kothamangalam, Ernakulam	2009	Indira Gandhi Memorial Trust	
35	JBT	Jai Bharath College of Management and Engineering Technology	Perumbavoor, Ernakulam	2009	Jai Bharath Educational Foundation	
36	JCE	Jawaharlal College of Engineering and Technology	Ottapalam, Palakkad	2008	Nehru College of Educational and Charitable Trust	
37	JIT	John Cox Memorial C S I Institute of Technology	Kannammoola, Trivandrum	2009	Society For Technical Training of South Kerala Dio	
38	JEC	Jyothi Engineering College	Cheruthuruthy, Thrissur	2002	Thrissur Educational Trust	
39	KME	K M E A Engineering College	Aluva, Ernakulam	2002	Kerala Muslim Educational Association	
40	GWE	K R Gouri Amma College of Engineering For Women	Cherthala, Alappuzha	2009	Sngm Educational & Cultural Trust	ceased
41	KMC	KMCT College of Engineering	Kalanthode, Kozhikode	2001	Kunhitharuvai Memorial Charitable Trust	
42	KMW	KMCT College of Engineering For Women	Kalanthode, Kozhikode	2009	Kunhitharuvai Memorial Charitable Trust	
43	KMP	KMP College of Engineering	Perumbavoor, Ernakulam	2011	Indira Gandhi Memorial Trust	ceased
44	KIT	Kottayam Institute of Technology and Science	Chengalam, Kottayam	2011	Psn Trust For Education and Charity	
45	KVE	KVM College of Engineering and Information Technology	Cherthala, Alappuzha	2001	Kvm Trust	ceased
46	LMC	Lourdes Matha College of Science and Technology	Kuttichal, Trivandrum	2002	Lourdes Matha Catholic Educational Society	
47	MEA	MEA Engineering College	Pattikkad, Malappuram	2002	Muslim Educational Association	
48	MES	MES College of Engineering	Kuttippuram, Malappuram	1994	Muslim Educational Society (Regd)	
49	MGC	M G College of Engineering	Thiruvallam, Trivandrum	2004	Social Justice Foundation	
50	DMC	M. Dasan Institute of Technology	Ulliyeri, Kozhikode	2012	M Dasan Memorial Co Operative Institute of Engg&In	
51	MEC	Malabar College of Engineering and Technology	Desamangalam, Thrissur	2009	Iqra Educational and Charitable Trust	
52	MLT	Malabar Institute of Technology	Anjarakandy, Kannur	2010	Prestige Educational Trust	
53	MLM	Mangalam College of Engineering	Ettumanoor, Kottayam	2002	Mangalam Educational Society	
54	MBC	Mar Baselios Christian College of Engineering and Technology	Peermade, Idukki	2001	Malankara Orthodox Syrian Church	
55	MBT	Mar Baselios College of Engineering and Technology	Nalanchira, Trivandrum	2002	Malankara Catholic Educational Society	
56	MBI	Mar Baselios Institute of Technology and Science	Kothamanagalam, Ernakulam	2009	Mar Baselios Educational and Charitable Trust	
58	MTA	Matha College of Technology	North Paravur, Ernakulam	2003	Nssuc & Ecr Trust	ceased now functioning as Kuttukaran Polytechnic College
59	MEE	MES College of Engineering and Technology	Kunnukara, Ernakulam	2011	Muslim Educational Society (Regd)	
60	MEK	MES Institute of Technology and Management	Chathannoor, Kollam	2009	Muslim Educational Society - Mes	
61	MET	MET'S School of Engineering	Mala, Thrissur	2002	Mala Educational Trust	
62	MCT	Mohandas College of Engineering and Technology	Nedumangad, Trivandrum	2002	V.N. Gangadhara Panicker Memorial Trust	
63	MKE	Mookambika Technical Campus	Mannathur, Ernakulam	2012	Namboothiri Trust	ceased
64	MZC	Mount Zion College of Engineering	Kadammanitta, Pathanamthitta	2001	Charitable Educational Welfare Society	
65	MZW	Mount Zion College of Engineering For Women	Chengannur, Alappuzha	2009	Charitable Educational and Welfare Society	
66	MCC	Musaliar College of Engineering	Chirayinkeezh, Trivandrum	2011	Musaliar Education Trust	
67	MCK	Musaliar College of Engineering and Technology	Kumbazha, Pathanamthitta	2002	Musaliar Education Trust	
68	MUS	Muslim Association College of Engineering	Venjaramoodu, Trivandrum	2002	Muslim Association, Trivandrum	
69	MUT	Muthoot Institute of Technology and Science	Puthencruz, Ernakulam	2013	Muthoot M George Institute of Technology	
70	NCE	Nehru College of Engineering and Research Centre	Thiruwilwamala, Thrissur	2002	Nehru College of Educational and Charitable Trust	
71	NIE	Nirmala College of Engineering	Chalakudy, Thrissur	2011	Nirmala Educational Trust	
72	NML	North Malabar Institute of Technology	Kanhangad, Kasaragod	2012	North Malabar Educational and Charitable Trust	ceased
74	PNC	Pinnacle School of Engineering and Technology	Anchal, Kollam	2013	Ashtapadi Foundation	ceased
75	PCE	Prime College of Engineering	Kodumbu, Palakkad	2009	Prime Educational & Charitable Trust	ceased
76	PRC	Providence College of Engineering	Chengannur, Alappuzha	2015	MGM Charitable Educational & Welfare Society	
77	PRS	Prs College of Engineering and Technology	Neyyattinkara, Trivandrum	2003	Mary Matha Education Society	ceased
78	RIE	Rajadhani Institute of Engineering and Technology	Attingal, Trivandrum	2009	Indira Charitable Trust	
79	RET	Rajagiri School of Engineering and Technology	Kakkanad, Ernakulam	2001	Cmi Rajagiri S H Province-Rect	
80	RCE	Royal College of Engineering and Technology	Chiramanangad, Thrissur	2003	Royal Educational Society and Research Centre	
81	SGT	Sadguru Swami Nithyananda Institute of Technology	Kanhangad, Kasaragod	2010	Sree Nithyananda Vidya Kendra	ceased now functioning as SN Polytechnic
82	SHR	Sahrdaya College of Engineering and Technology	Kodakara, Thrissur	2002	Irinjalakuda Diocesan Educational Trust	
83	MGP	Saintgits College of Engineering	Pathamuttom, Kottayam	2002	Mar Gregorios Educational Society	
84	SIT	Sarabhai Institute of Science and Technology	Vellanad, Trivandrum	2004	Space Engineers Welfare Society	
85	SCM	SCMS School of Engineering and Technology	Karukutty, Ernakulam	2001	Prathap Foundation For Education and Training	
86	SHM	Shahul Hameed Memorial Engineering College	Kadakkal, Kollam	2002	Kadakkal Educational Trust	ceased
87	SNM	SNM Institute of Management and Technology	North Paravur, Ernakulam	2002	HMDP Sabha (1882), Moothakunnam.	
88	SBC	Sree Buddha College of Engineering	Nooranad, Alappuzha	2002	Sree Buddha Educational Society, Kollam	
89	SBW	Sree Buddha College of Engineering For Women	Elavumthitta, Pathanamthitta	2009	Sree Buddha Foundation, Kollam	
90	ECE	Sree Ernakulathappan College of Engineering and Management	Injakundu(Mupliyam), Thrissur	2011	Ernakulathappan Charitable and Educational Trust	now functioning as ICCS College of Engineering and Management
91	SNC	Sree Narayana Guru College of Engineering and Technology	Payyanur, Kannur	2003	Sree Bhakthi Samvardhini Yogam	
92	SNT	Sree Narayana Guru Institute of Science and Technology	North Paravur, Ernakulam	2003	Gurudeva Trust	
93	SNG	Sree Narayana Gurukulam College of Engineering	Kolenchery, Ernakulam	2002	Sree Narayana Gurukulam Charitable Trust	
94	SNP	Sree Narayana Institute of Technology	Adoor, Pathanamthitta	2011	Pattayil Kunju Kunju Memorial Charitable Trust	
95	SPT	Sreepathy Institute of Management and Technology	Vavanoor, Palakkad	2009	Sreepathy Trust	
96	VPE	Sri Vellappally Natesan College of Engineering	Mavelikara, Alappuzha	2009	Sree Gurudeva Charitable & Educational Trust	now MAHAGURU INSTITUTE OF TECHNOLOGY
97	SGP	St. Gregorios College of Engineering	Perla, Kasaragod	2014	St. Gregorios Memorial Trust	ceased
98	SJC	St. Joseph's College of Engineering and Technology	Choondacherry, Kottayam	2002	Diocesan Technical Education Trust Palai	
99	STM	St. Thomas College of Engineering and Technology	Sivapuram, Kannur	2014	St Thomas Educational Society	
100	STC	St. Thomas College of Engineering and Technology	Chengannur, Alappuzha	2010	St Thomas Educational Society	
101	STI	St.Thomas Institute for Science and Technology	Kazhakuttom, Trivandrum	2010	The Mar Thoma Church Educational Society	
102	TKI	TKM Institute of Technology	Ezhukone, Kollam	2002	Tkm College Trust	
103	TJE	Thejus Engineering College	Erumapetty, Thrissur	2009	Cheruvathur Foundation	
104	TOC	Toc H Institute of Science and Technology	Arakkunnam, Ernakulam	2002	Toc H Public School Society	
105	TCE	Toms College of Engineering For Startups	Mattakara, Kottayam	2014	Thirunilam Educational Trust	
106	TEC	Travancore Engineering College	Oyoor, Kollam	2002	Travancore Education Society	ceased
107	TCT	Trinity College of Engineering	Naruvamoodu, Thiruvananthapuram	2011	Trinity Charitable Trust	
108	UKP	UKF College of Engineering and Technology	Puthenkulam, Kollam	2009	Universal Knowledge Foundation	
109	UNT	Universal Engineering College	Irinjalakuda, Thrissur	2011	Universal Educational Trust	
110	VKE	Valia Koonambaikulathamma College of Engineering and Technology	Parippally, Kollam	2009	Valia Koonambaikulam Sree Bhadrakali Kshetra Trust	
111	VVT	Vedavyasa Institute of Technology	Karad Paramba, Malappuram	2004	Vedavyasa Trust	
112	VAS	Vidya Academy of Science and Technology	Thalakkottukkara, Thrissur	2003	Vidya International Charitable Trust	
113	VAK	Vidya Academy of Science and Technology Technical Campus	Kilimanoor, Thiruvananthapuram	2013	Vidya International Charitable Trust	
114	VIT	VISAT Engineering College	Mutholapuram, Ernakulam	2011	Vinjyan Foundation	
115	VML	Vimal Jyothi Engineering College	Chemperi, Kannur	2002	Mehsar Diocesan Educational Trust, Thalassery	
116	VJC	Viswajyothi College of Engineering and Technology	Muvattupuzha, Ernakulam	2001	Diocesan Technical Education Trust Kothamangalam	
117	YCW	Younus College of Engineering	Kottarakkara, Kollam	2010	Fathima Memorial Educational Trust	
118	YCE	Younus College of Engineering & Technology	Vadakkevila, Kollam	2002	Fathima Memorial Educational Trust	ceased
119	YCK	Younus Institute of Technology	Kannanalloor, Kollam	2011	Fathima Memorial Educational Trust	ceased

== See also ==
- KEAM
- Institutes of National Importance
