= List of colleges in Thiruvananthapuram =

Thiruvananthapuram is the capital city of Kerala, India. The city has the most number of schools, higher educational institutions, professional colleges and research institutes in Kerala.

This is a list of prominent colleges and other prominent higher educational institutes in Thiruvananthapuram:

== Undergraduate Colleges ==
- Indian Institute of Science Education and Research (IISER).
- Mahatma Gandhi College (MG College)
- Mar Ivanios College
- Government Arts College, Thiruvananthapuram
- KNM Govt. Arts and Science College
- Government College, Attingal
- Iqbal College
- Sree Narayana College, Chempazhanthy
- Government College, Kariavattom
- University College Thiruvananthapuram
- St. Xavier's College, Thumba
- VTM NSS College, Dhanuvachapuram
- College of Applied Science, Dhanuvachapuram
- Christ Nagar college, Maranalloor
- All Saints College, Thiruvananthapuram
- National College, Ambalathara
- Dr. Palpu College of Arts and Science, Pangode

== Professional colleges ==
=== Architecture ===
- College of Engineering, Trivandrum, Department of Architecture
- College of Architecture, Trivandrum, C.A.T

=== Engineering ===
- Indian Institute of Space Science and Technology
- College of Engineering, Trivandrum
- Government Engineering College Barton Hill
- Sree Chitra Thirunal College of Engineering, Pappanamcode, Trivandrum
- Marian Engineering College, Kazhakuttom, Trivandrum
- Rajadhani Institute of Engineering and Technology, Nagaroor, Attingal, Trivandrum
- Lourdes Matha College of Science and Technology, Kuttichal, Trivandrum
- ACE College of Engineering, Trivandrum
- College of Engineering, Attingal
- College of Engineering, Muttathara
- John Cox Memorial C.S.I Institute of Technology, Kannammoola
- Mar Baselios College of Engineering and Technology, Nalanchira
- University College of Engineering, Kariavattom
- Mohandas College of Engineering & Technology, Anad, Nedumangad, Thiruvananthapuram (MCET)
- PA AZIZ College of Engineering and Technology, Greenhills Karakulam po, Peroorkada (PAACET)
- Sarabhai Institute of Science & Technology, Vellanadu, Thiruvananthapuram
- Heera College of engineering and Technology, Panavoor P.O., Nedumangadu, Trivandrum
- Muslim Association College of Engineering
- Vidya Academy of Science and Technology Technical Campus, Kilimanoor

=== Music and arts ===
- College of Fine Arts Trivandrum

=== Law ===
- Government Law College, Thiruvananthapuram
- Kerala Law Academy Law College
- Mar Gregorios College of Law

=== Medical ===
- Trivandrum Medical College
- SUT Academy of Medical Sciences, Vattappara
- Sree Chitra Thirunal Institute of Medical Sciences and Technology

=== Agriculture ===
- College of Agriculture, Vellayani

== Other institutes ==
- Centre for Development Studies
- Centre for Earth Science Studies
- The Oriental Research Institute & Manuscripts Library
- aims Medical/Engineering Training, Balaramapuram
- Keltron Knowledge Service Group (A Govt of Kerala Undertaking)
- IISER TVM

== See also ==
- Schools in Trivandrum
