= College of Engineering Chengannur =

College in Kerala, India

College of Engineering, Chengannur (CEC)
- കോളേജ് ഓഫ് എഞ്ചിനീയറിംഗ് ചെങ്ങന്നൂർ (സി.ഇ.സി)
- Motto: To become a frontline global institute.
- Type: Public; Aided by the World Bank under TEQIP Programme Govt. of India
- Established: 1993
- Affiliations: AICTE, A P J Abdul Kalam Technological University (initially KTU) - 2015 onwards, earlier Cochin University of Science and Technology
- Principal: Dr Hari VS (2024 onwards)
- Faculty: 200
- Students: 1776
- Location: Chengannur, Kerala, India; 9.318483°N 76.614017°E
- Website: ceconline.edu/index.php

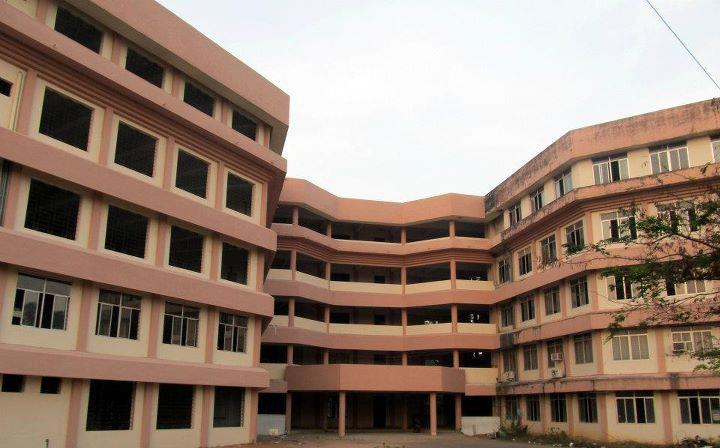
New Face of CEC, as in 2012

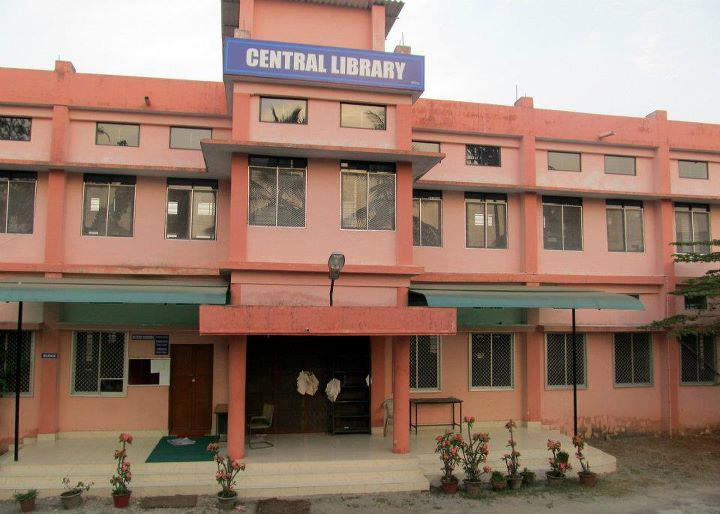
Central Library of CEC

The College of Engineering Chengannur commonly known as CEC, is an engineering institute in the state of Kerala, India, that was established by the Government of Kerala under the aegis of the Institute of Human Resources Development (IHRD) in 1993. The college is located in Chengannur, Alappuzha. The college is affiliated to the APJ Abdul Kalam Technological University and the courses are recognised by AICTE.

== Location ==
CEC is situated in the heart of Chengannur.

== Overview ==
The college has been approved by the All India Council for Technical Education, New Delhi . Being located in Chengannur town, Alleppey district, the college has access to transport, communication, and lodging facilities. It was one of the five engineering colleges in Kerala selected by the government of India for the Technical Education Quality Improvement Programme (TEQIP). The college is listed as `CHN' in the allocation list of engineering seats maintained by the Commissioner for Entrance Examinations, Government of Kerala

== Courses ==
Two year postgraduate course in:

- M.Tech Electronics Engineering (VLSI and Embedded Systems) - 24 seats (from academic year 2010-11)
- M.Tech Computer Science (Digital Image Processing) - 24 seats
- MCA Master of Computer Application(from academic year 2022) - 60 seats

Four-year B.Tech. degrees in:

- Computer Science and Engineering - 180 seats (formerly, Computer Engineering)
- Electronics and Communication Engineering - 120 seats (formerly, Electronics Engineering)
- Electrical and Electronics Engineering - 60 seats (from academic year 2009-10)

== About ==
Admission to the courses is on an annual basis and is based on the All Kerala Common Entrance Examination conducted by the Controller of Entrance Examinations, Government of Kerala. The admissions to the free/merit seats and management seats are through the Central Allotment Process conducted by the Controller of Entrance Examinations, Government of Kerala. The proportion of seats are as follows: free/merit seats 50%, management seats 35% (as aforementioned allotment to both these categories are through the Central Allotment Process ), the remaining 15% seats come under the NRI quota.

=== Annual intake ===
CEC has an annual intake of 420 students (+10% lateral entry students) through government allotment, divided among the four branches as follows:

- Computer Science and Engineering: 120 (+10% lateral entry students)
- Electronics and Communication Engineering: 120(+10% lateral entry students)
- Electrical and Electronics Engineering: 120 (+10% lateral entry students)
- Electronics and Instrumentation Engineering: 60 (+10% lateral entry students)

=== CEC technical and non-technical events ===
==== SUMMIT ====
Summit is a biennial technical festival conducted by the college, to providing a platform for improving the technical and non-technical skills of the students. The Summit offers events including seminars and workshops.

== Technical organizations ==
=== IEEE Student Branch ===
An IEEE student branch was formed in CEC in mid-1997, with the goal of keeping the students in touch with technological advances. An IEEE library was inaugurated in December 1999. The library houses journals and magazines of IEEE. The IEEE student branch comes under the IEEE Kerala Section CEC's IEEE student members have presented projects at state and national level conferences and competitions. An IEEE Robotics Initiative Program has begun, with groups designing robots. IEEE-CEC is known for its consistent achievements since its inception in 1996. IEEE-CEC is also known for many firsts including being the first IEEE Student Branch in the world to win the IEEE WIE SB Affinity Group of the year award in 2005.

SURGE CEC

=== FOCES (Forum of Computer Engineering Students) ===
FOCES is an organization of CSE students of the college. The forum aims at improving the technical and industrial knowledge of the students. It organizes talks by personalities in the industry on evolving technologies in computing, workshops on developing platforms, languages and software packages in the IT industry..

=== ExESS (Electronics Engineering Students Society) ===
The activities of ExESS have helped students in attending state and national level contests. Apart from conducting technical learning sessions for Component familiarisations and Electronic Design Automation (EDA) tools, ExESS also does hands-on training sessions for soldering and PCB fabrication.

=== FLOSS (Free/Libre/Open-Source Software) Cell ===
The FLOSS cell has been organized to explain Open Source and Linux. The cell conducts Linux familiarisation classes, installation sessions and other activities. FLOSS Cell helps install and maintain systems and LAN in the nearby government school.

=== Innovation and Entrepreneurship Development Cell [IEDC] ===
The Innovation and Entrepreneurship Development Cell [IEDC] Bootcamp College of Engineering Chengannur came into existence in June 2015.They aim at promoting entrepreneurial spirit among students.IEDC seeks to inculcate the entrepreneurial culture among the students which would, in turn, inspire them to go a step further and take up the challenge of entrepreneurship.

== Non-technical organizations ==
=== National Service Scheme ===
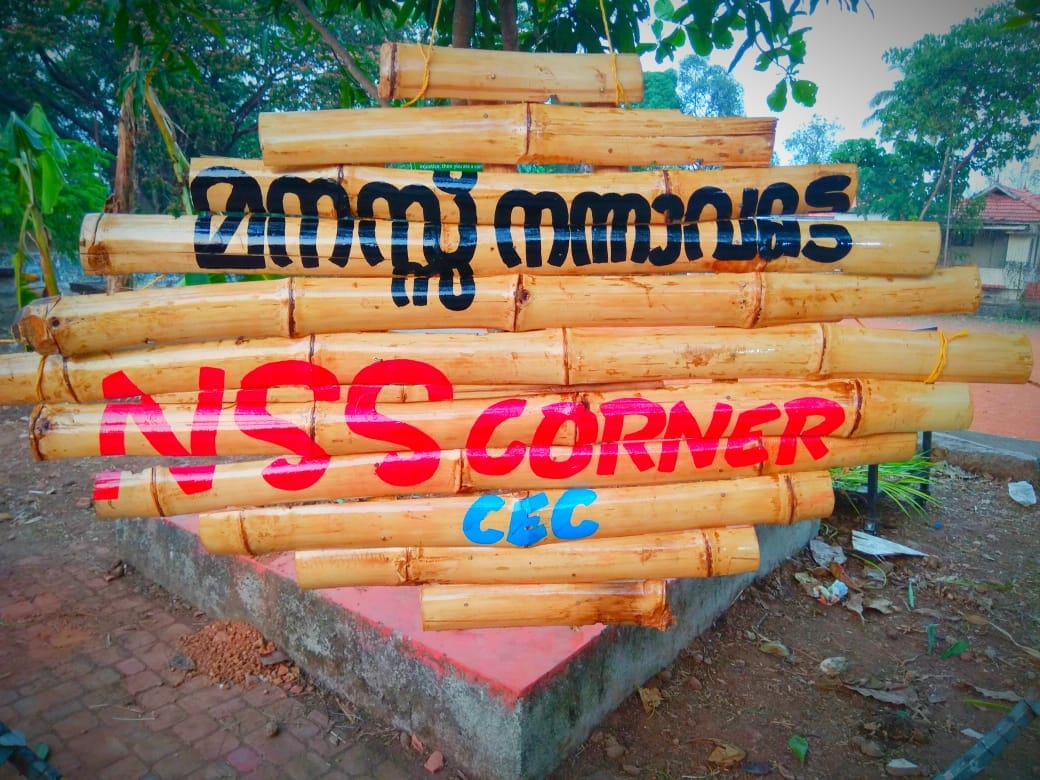

NSS CEC now consists of 3 units with a maximum volunteer strength of 300, in which each student embraces the idea of everyone belonging to the same family.

Each year volunteers take part in 'Punarjani', an event where they aid community service centers such as hospitals in repairing damaged machinery and extend their assistance in many other ways. For example, they participate in a Friday food serving program at District Hospital Chengannur to provide food for those in need. As directed by the Cell, the three units also conduct campus programs exploring the talents in youth, awareness sessions brushing up their knowledge, and community programs that improvise their social skills. The units also help with the internal duties of the college, such as active participation during admission procedures and campus cleaning programs. The college hosts a variety of talents whose skills are displayed in a variety of cultural events such as flash mobs, street plays on relevant topics, etc. It successfully hosted the second edition of UYILO, a techno-cultural fest, and it plans to conduct further editions of the same in the years to come.

=== Santhwanam ===
Integrated with the NSS unit, it undertakes campus cleaning drives, sending volunteers to the Pulse-Polio Immunization programs of the Government of India, and organizes orphanage visits.

=== Nature Club ===
CEC has joined hands with the "Save the Earth" global movement through the `Aranyam' forestry club. Group discussions, awareness camps and visits to nearby sanctuaries are some of the activities.

=== Arts Club ===
ACE (Arts Club for Engineers) provides a platform for students to develop their creative skills. It runs the Music club, Quiz and Debate club, and Audio Visual club. The Arts Club organizes "Utsav", the college arts festival.

=== The Students' Executive Senate (CEC Senate) ===
The Students Executive Senate, simply known as 'CEC Senate', is the supreme student body. The members of the senate are elected by and from the students, with two representatives from each class. The objectives of the senate are: to train the students of the college in their duties, responsibilities, and rights, to organize debates, seminars, group discussions, work squads, and tours, and to encourage sports, arts and other cultural, social or recreational activities.

== Training Placement Cell ==
The Training and Placement Cell (TPC) is a blend of faculty and students. With a group of students led by a Placement officer (Dr Raju M), the TPC helps the CECians choose their goal, prepare for it and find placements in work. The TPC of Chengannur Engineering College was the first of its kind, among the college placement units in the state, to introduce an 'Industry like' screening system for the selection of TPC student members.

== Entrepreneurship ==
More than 30 companies have been initiated by current and former students of this institute.

Some of the noteworthy companies from College of Engineering Chengannur are :

- ExTravelMoney Technosol - Online Forex Services Product
- Profoundis Labs - Known for developing the B2B sales intelligence tool Vibe (Acquired by FullContact)
- Entri.me - Educational Tech Product Startup
- Praudyogiki Technolabs LLP - IT Solutions

== Notable alumni ==
- Anagha, Indian film industry
- Rahul Ramesh, Founder & CTPO at Entri.app
- Arjun R Pillai, Founder & CEO at Docket
- Ranjith Antony, Founder & CEO at Perlybrook Labs
- T._T._Praveen, Indian Politician and Member of Legislative Assembly
- Sujith Dermal, Cofounder at Powerlattice

== See also ==
- List of Engineering Colleges in Kerala
- KEAM
