= List of institutions of higher education in Thrissur district =

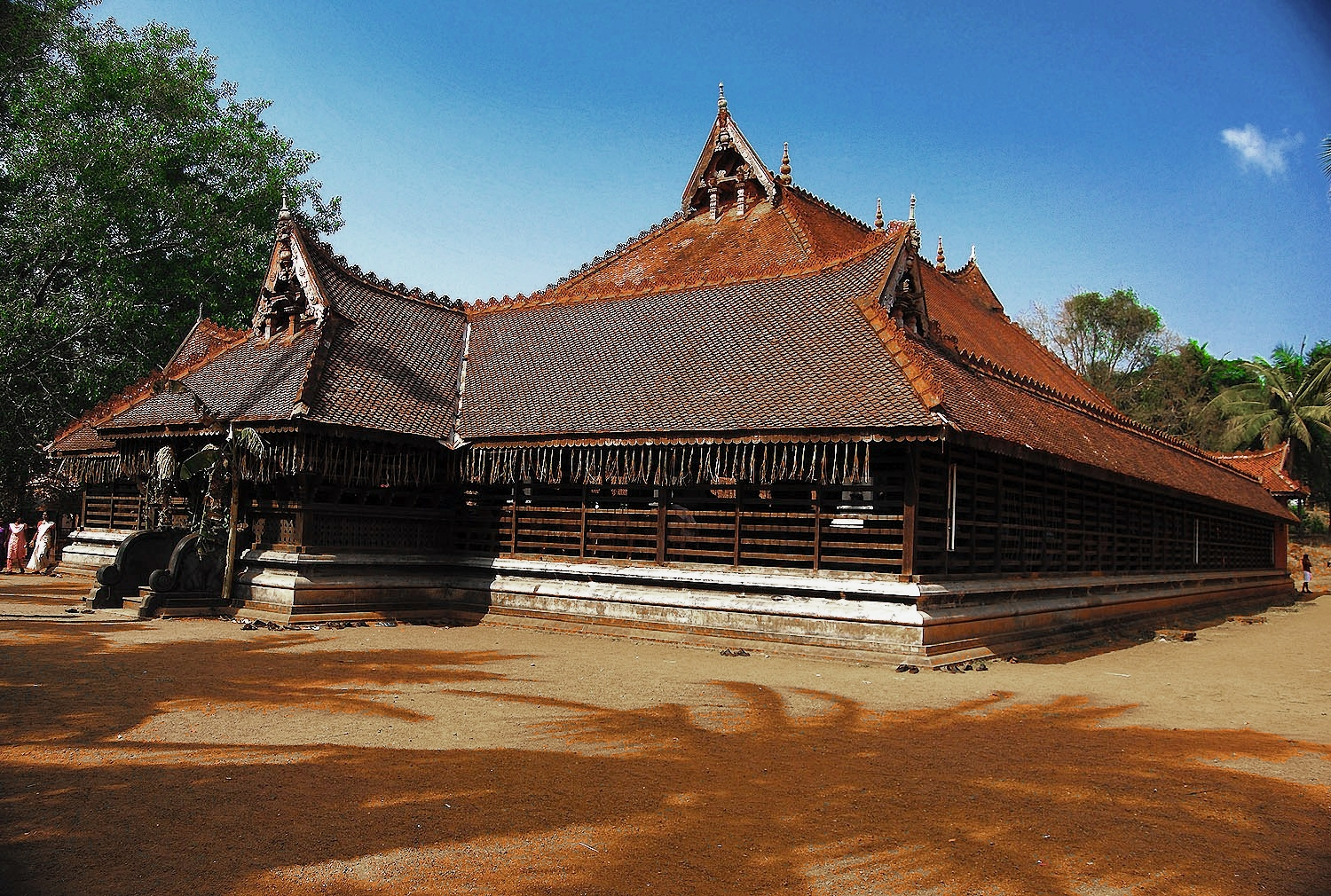
Kerala Kalamandalam, Cheruthuruthy

Thrissur is the Cultural Capital of Kerala and a major financial and commercial hub in South India. Thrissur has traditionally been a centre of learning. With the decline of Buddhism and Jainism, Thrissur became an important centre of Sanskrit learning. Thrissur is also fast becoming the educational capital of Kerala too. Church Mission Society School started in 1845 is the oldest school and St. Thomas College is the first college in Thrissur. On 2nd September 2022, Thrissur joined the UNESCO Global Network of Learning Cities (GNLC).

The existence of four medical colleges, Kerala Agricultural University, about a dozen engineering colleges, College of Agriculture, Ayurveda college, veterinary college, business schools, well-known arts and science colleges and good residential schools make Thrissur a scholar's city. Thrissur is also the centre of coaching classes for the aspiring doctors and engineers of the future. These coaching classes prepare students for various all-India entrance examinations. Their presence gives Thrissur a distinct aura of being an educational centre of Kerala.

== Universities ==
- Kerala Agricultural University, Thrissur
- Kerala University of Health Sciences, Thrissur
- Kerala Institute of Local Administration (KILA), Thrissur
- Kerala Kalamandalam, Thrissur
- Rashtreeya Sanskrit Samsthan, Puranattukara, Thrissur

== Degree colleges ==
=== Professional Degree College ===
College of Agriculture Vellanikkara, Mannuthy, കേരള കാർഷിക സർവ്വകലാശാല.

=== Thrissur City ===
- IIBMR Indian Institute of Business management & Research, Thrissur|IIBMR - International Institute of Business management & Research, Thrissur
- St. Aloysius College, Thrissur
- Sri C. Achutha Menon Government College, Kuttanellur
- International School of Design (INSD), Thrissur
- Vimala College, Thrissur
- St. Mary's College, Thrissur
- St. Thomas College, Thrissur
- Sree Kerala Varma college, Thrissur
- College of Fine Arts, Thrissur
- Paramekkavu arts and science college, Thrissur
- Government arts and science college, Ollur, Thrissur
- Government Rama Varma memorial college for music and performing arts, Thrissur
- Don Bosco College, Mannuthy
- Riju & PSK Classes, Thrissur

=== Thrissur Rural ===
- St. Joseph's College, Irinjalakuda
- Christ College, Irinjalakuda
- Little Flower College, Guruvayur
- Carmel College, Mala
- Aims College, Vatanappally
- Prajyoti Niketan College, Pudukad
- Naipunnya Institute of Management and Information Technology, Koratty
- Sri Vyasa NSS College, Wadakkanchery
- Sree Gokulam College of Arts & Science for Women, Pazhuvil West
- Sree Narayana College, Nattika
- Sree Narayana Guru College Of Advanced Studies, Nattika
- Sree Krishna College, Guruvayur
- Panampilly Memorial Government College, Chalakudy
- Sahrdaya College of Advanced Studies, Kodakara
- Kunjikuttan Thampuran Memorial Government College, Kodungallur (KKTM Government College)
- MES Asmabi College, Kodungallur
- Mar Dionysius College, Pazhanji
- Vivekananda College, Kunnamkulam
- Tharananellore Arts and Science College, Irinjalakkuda
- Ansar Women's College, Perumpilavu
- Govt. Arts and Science College, Chelakkara
- Mother Arts & Science College, Peruvalloor
- A.C. Kunhimon Haji Memorial I.C.A College, Thozhiyur
- Sree Narayana Guru College of Advanced Studies, Vazhukkumpara
- IIBMR, Indian Institute of Business Management and Research, Thrissur

== Medical colleges ==
- Government Medical College, Thrissur
- Jubilee Mission Medical College and Research Institute, Thrissur
- Amala Institute of Medical Sciences, Amala Nagar, Thrissur

== Engineering colleges ==
- Government Engineering College, Thrissur

=== Thrissur Rural ===
- Vidya Academy of Science and Technology
- Sahrdaya College of Engineering and Technology
- Jyothi Engineering College, Cheruthuruthy, Thrissur
- Royal College of Engineering & Technology
- IES College of Engineering, Chittilappilly
- IES College of Architecture, Chittilappilly
- Malabar College of Engineering and Technology
- MET's School of Engineering, Mala
- Southern College of Engineering & Technology, Chalakudy
- Axis College of Engineering & Technology, Kodakara
- Holy Grace Academy of Engineering, Mala
- Universal Engineering College, Irinjalakuda
- Christ College of Engineering, Irinjalakuda
- Focus Institute of Science and Technology, Poomala
- Nehru College of Engineering and Research Centre, Pambady
- Nirmala College of Engineering, Chalakudy

== MBA colleges ==
=== MBA/MCA Colleges in Thrissur City ===
- IIBMR Indian Institute of Business Management and Research, Thrissur
- SMS Peramangalam, University of Calicut
- Elijah Institute of Management Studies, Rama Varma Puram, Thrissur city
- John Mathai Centre, Aranattukara Thrissur city
- International School of Design (INSD), Thrissur

=== MBA/MCA Colleges in Thrissur Rural ===
- Aims College, Vatanappally
- Naipunya Business School, Koratty
- Prajyothi Niketan College, Pudukkad
- Holy Grace Academy of Management Studies, Mala
- West Fort Academy for Higher Education, Pottore, Thrissur (IMT)
- Sahrdaya Institute of Management Studies, Kodakara
- Nirmala College of Management Studies, Chalakudy
- Nehru College of Engineering and Research Centre, Pambady

== Media college ==
- Nirmala College of Arts and Science, Chalakudy
- Chethana college of Media and Performing Arts, Chiyyaram, Thrissur city
- Divine Institute of Media Science, Muringoor, Thrissur
- Tiga Vision Institute of Media Studies, Poothole
- College of Applied Sciences (IHRD)
- College of Applied Science, Chelakkara
- College of Applied Science, Valapad
- College of Applied Science IHRD Polytechnic, Kallettumkara

== Arabic college ==
- Thaqwa Aflal-ul-ulama Arabic College, Andathode

== Polytechnic colleges ==
=== Thrissur ===
- Maharaja’s Technological Institute, Thrissur City
- Women's Polytechnic College, Thrissur

=== Thrissur Rural ===
- Aims College, Vatanappally
- Sree Rama Government Polytechnic College, Thriprayar
- Thiagarajar Polytechnic College, Alagappanagar
- Government Polytechnic College, Koratty
- Government Polytechnic College, Kunnamkulam
- Government Polytechnic College, Chelakkara
- Model Polytechnic, Kallettumkara
- Christ Technical Academy, Irinjalakuda
- Nirmala Institute of Technology, Chalakudy

== Nursing colleges ==
- West Fort College of Nursing West Fort Hospital, Thrissur city
- Mother College of Nursing, Pullazhi, Thrissur city
- Aswini College of Nursing, Nadathara, Thrissur city
- Jubilee Mission College of Nursing, Thrissur city
- Amala College of Nursing, Amala Nagar, Thrissur
- Government College of Nursing, Thrissur
- Ansar Nursing college, Perumpilavu, Thrissur

== Training colleges ==
- Aims College, Vatanappally
- Government B.Ed Centre, Ollur
- Government B.Ed Centre, Thalikkulam
- International School of Design (INSD), Thrissur
- JPE Training College, Koorkenchery, Thrissur
- Navajyothi College of Teacher Education for Women, Thrissur
- Sree Vivekananda Teacher Education Centre
- Ideal Educational Society Training College, Thrissur
- Institute of Advanced Study in Education, Thrissur (Govt.)

== Ayurveda colleges ==
=== Thrissur City ===
- Vaidyaratnam Ayurveda College, Ollur

=== Thrissur Rural ===
- Poomully Neelakandan Namboothiripad Memorial Ayurveda Medical College, Cheruthuruthy, Thrissur

== Dental colleges ==
- PSM College of Dental Science and Research, Akkikkavu, Thrissur
- Government Dental College, Thrissur

== Law colleges ==
=== Thrissur City ===
- Government Law College, Thrissur (Ayyanthole)
- AIM Law College, Poyya, Mala

== College of pharmacy ==
- St James College of Pharmaceutical Sciences, Chalakkudi
- Thriveni Institute of Pharmacy, Kechery, Thrissur
- ELIMS College of Pharmacy, Villadam, Ramavarmapuram P O, Thrissur
- Nirmala College of Health Science, Chalakudy
- WEST FORT COLLEGE OF PHARMACY, POTTORE, THRISSUR

== College of forestry ==
- College of Forestry, Vellanikkara

== College of dairy science ==
- College of Dairy Science and Technology, Mannuthy

== College of Agriculture ==
- College of Agriculture, Vellanikkara

== Colleges of veterinary education ==
- College of Veterinary and Animal Sciences, Mannuthy

== Research Institutes and academies ==
- Kerala Forest Research Institute, Thrissur city
- Prajyoti Niketan International Centre for Research, Training and Service, Pudukad
- Excise Academy and Research Centre, Thrissur city
- Centre of Science and Technology for Rural Development, Thrissur city
- National Research Institute for Panchakarma, Cheruthuruthy, Thrissur
- Banana Research station, Kannara
- Agronomic Research station, Chalakkudy
- Cashew Research station, Madakkathara
- Agricultural Research station, Mannuthy
- Plant Propagation & Nursery Management Unit, Vellanikkara
- Food Craft Institute, Poothole, Thrissur
- School of Drama, Thrissur
- National Bureau of Plant Genetic Resources (ICAR), Regional Station, Thrissur
- Regional Institute for Physical Medicine and Rehabilitation, Kallettumkara, Thrissur
- Centre for Materials for Electronics Technology (C-MET), Thrissur
