= NSS College of Engineering =

Engineering college in Kerala, India

Coordinates: 10.8243°N 76.6420°E

- Motto: उद्धरेदात्मनात्मानं
- Motto in English: uddhared ātmanātmānaṁ (Elevate yourself through the power of your mind) [Gita-ch 6-5]
- Type: Government-Aided
- Established: 1960
- Affiliations: Universities (Since 1960): 1. APJ Abdul Kalam Technological University (Since 2015); 2. University of Calicut (1968-2015); 3. University of Kerala (1960-1968)
- Chairman: General Secretary, Nair Service Society
- Principal: Dr. Saju N
- Government Nominee: Director of Technical Education
- Undergraduates: 2420
- Postgraduates: 180
- Location: Palakkad, Kerala, 678008, India
- Campus: 125 acres (500,000 m^{2})
- Acronym: NSSCE
- Website: nssce.ac.in

NSS College of Engineering, Palakkad (Commonly known as NSSCE) is the fourth engineering educational institution established in Kerala, India. It was founded in 1960 by Nair Service Society. The college is affiliated to the APJ Abdul Kalam Technological University since its inception in 2015.

The campus is situated in NSS Nagar at Akathethara, 9 km from Palakkad town, and 3 km from the Palakkad junction Railway station. The nearest airports are at Coimbatore (55 km) and Cochin International Airport (110 km). Spread over 100 acres, it includes an administrative block and other blocks, a library block and five hostels including two for women and with good infrastructure.

== History ==
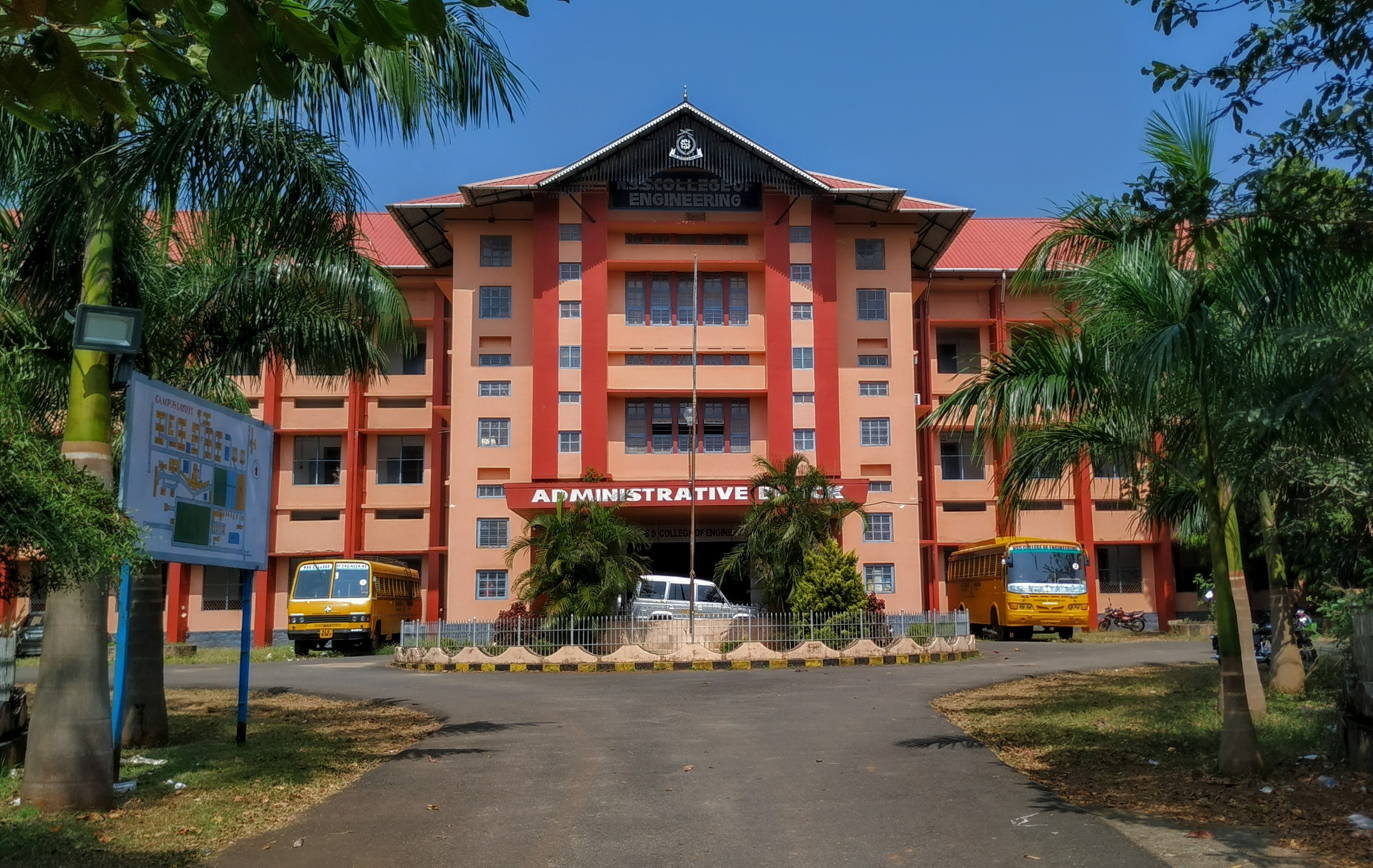
NSS College of Engineering, Administrative Block front view

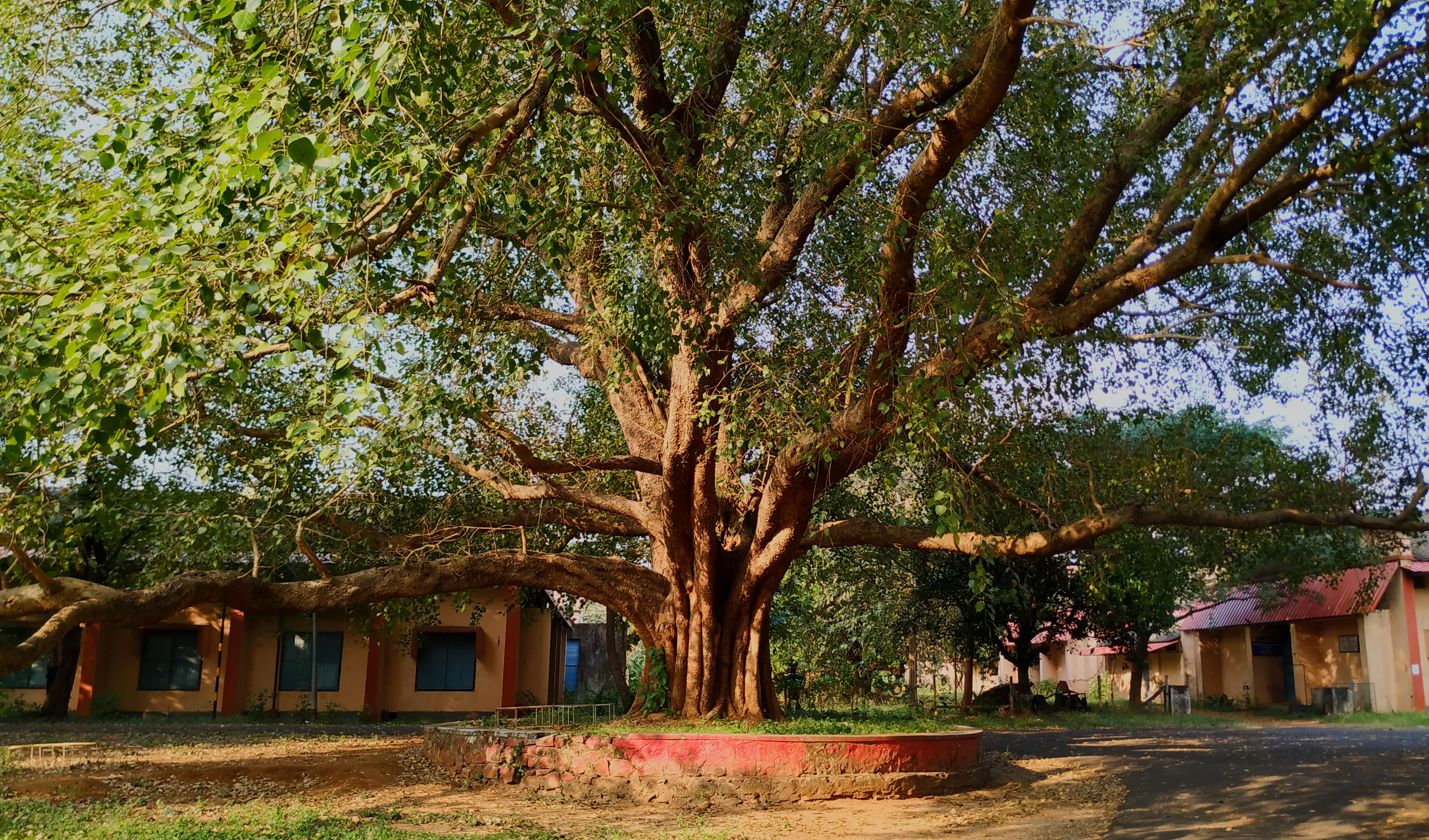
Old Banyan tree in the Campus (Referred to as Aalthara inside the campus)

The school was founded in 1960 by Nair Service Society. It is the fourth engineering institute and the second Govt-Aided engineering institute in Kerala. The college started with three branches of engineering viz, Civil Engineering, Mechanical Engineering and Electrical and Electronics Engineering. Instrumentation and Control Engineering, Electronics and Communication Engineering and Computer Science Engineering were started in 1980, 1986 and 1999 respectively. The institution offers M.Tech degree courses from 2011. The college was previously affiliated to University of Kerala from 1960 to 1968 and University of Calicut from 1968 to 2015 until the establishment of APJ Abdul Kalam Technological University.

== Academics ==
The institution offers B.Tech and M.Tech degree courses of the A P J Abdul Kalam Technological University in the following 6 branches of engineering.

- Mechanical Engineering (ME)
- Electrical & Electronics Engineering (EEE)
- Civil Engineering (CE)
- Instrumentation & Control Engineering (IC)
- Electronics & Communication Engineering (EC)
- Computer Science Engineering (CSE)

The College started with three branches of Engineering viz, Civil, Mechanical and Electrical & Electronics Engineering, made long strides with the introduction of Instrumentation & Control Engineering course in 1980, Electronics & Communication Engineering in 1986 and Computer Science Engineering in 1999. The following courses are offered by the college.

=== Btech ===
Sl No.	Branch	Annual Intake	Duration
1.	Civil	120 (102 Merit + 18 Management)	4 Years
2.	Mechanical	120 (102 Merit + 18 Management)	4 Years
3.	EEE	120 (102 Merit + 18 Management)	4 Years
4.	EC	90 (77 Merit + 13 Management)	4 Years
5.	IC	60 (51 Merit + 9 Management)	4 Years
6.	CSE	60 (51 Merit + 9 Management)	4 Years

=== Mtech ===
SlNo.	Stream	Annual Intake	Duration
1.	Communication Engineering	18(15 Merit + 3 Management)	2 Years
2.	Power Electronics	18(15 Merit + 3 Management)	2 Years
3.	Computer Science and Engineering	18(15 Merit + 3 Management)	2 Years
4.	Computer Integrated Manufacturing	18(15 Merit + 3 Management)	2 Years
5.	Structural Engineering	18(15 Merit + 3 Management)	2 Years
6.	Biomedical Engineering	18(15 Merit + 3 Management)	2 Years

=== Admissions ===
The institute admits students based on the following entrance exams.

Undergraduate Programs

- Kerala Engineering Entrance Examination, KEAM conducted by the Office of the Commissioner of Entrance Exams run by the Government of Kerala. The remaining seats are filled by other quotas including those reserved for the management.

Postgraduate Programs

- Graduate Aptitude Test in Engineering (GATE) conducted by the Indian Institutes of Technology, IITs. and also students can get admission through previous academic marks (Non gate admission).

In addition to this, a 10% seats are provided for admission to the third semester classes for diploma holders (Lateral entry system).

== Alumni ==
The alumni association has chapters in cities in India including Mumbai, Pune, Bangalore, Chennai, Kozhikode, Palakkad and Kochi. The alumni chapters outside India include Bangalore (NECAB), Qatar (Anecx), Bahrain (NEXSA), UAE (NSSCE) and Kuwait (NSSCEAK) Chapters.

=== Notable alumni ===
- Prasanth Nair, Indian Air Force (IAF) test pilot and ISRO Astronaut (Gaganyatri)
- Prakash Bare, actor, producer
- M Sivasankar IAS

== Facilities ==
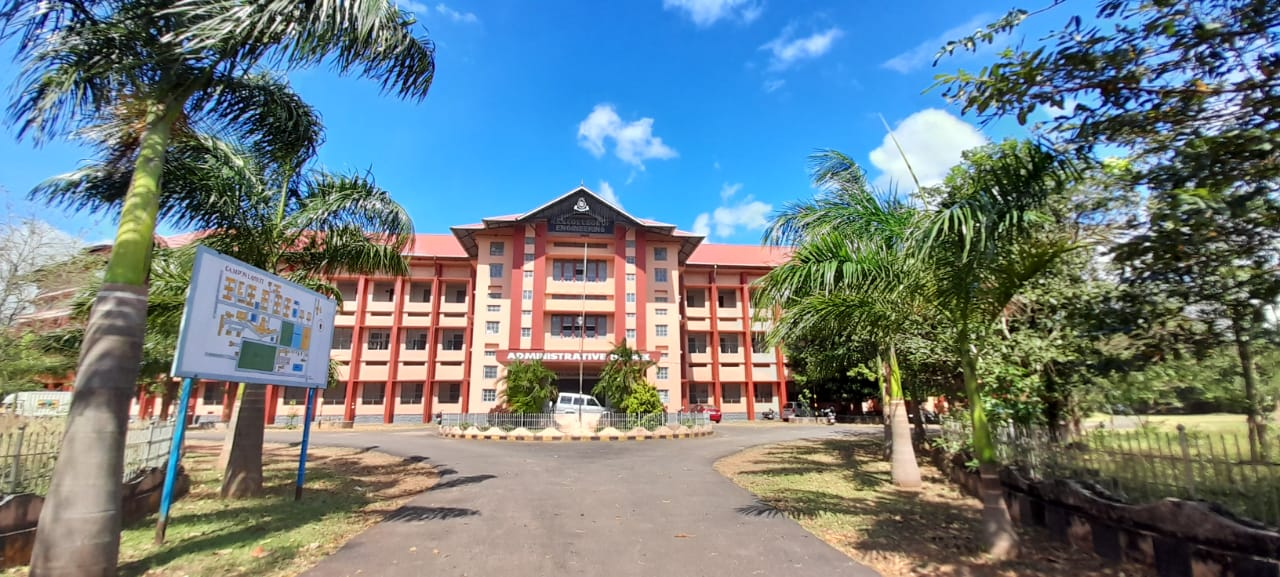
View of Administrative Block, NSSCE

There are three men's hostel blocks and two women's hostel block with a capacity of 483 and 500 students respectively. The hostels are under direct control of the warden and each hostel has one or two members of the staff of the college as assistant wardens and are responsible to matters connected with the hostel. The Principal is the Ex Officio Chief Warden. There is provision for vegetarian and non-vegetarian food at all the hostels. The hostel mess' are run by the students. The men's hostels are named MH-I(Ganga), MH-II(Yamuna) and MH-III(Kaveri). MH-III is the freshmen's hostel.The Ladies Hostel is named Nila. Female freshers have hosteling facilities in the Working Women's Hostel (WWH) run by Nair Service Society. All the hostels are equipped with high speed WiFi facility. Admissions to hostels are based on the internal marks obtained by the students applying in each semester(except for freshers).

The central library has a collection of books both academic and general topics. The computerized Library Information System makes it easy for one to find books. Apart from the central library each department has a separate library which facilitate books to the students of the respective departments. The library facilitates students to browse internet and find books in the digital library.

Central Computing Facility, Computer Network Centre and Skill Delivery Platform (an initiative by Additional Skill Acquisition Programme (ASAP) in collaboration with Information and Communication Technology (ICT) Academy of Kerala and Kerala State IT Infrastructure Limited (KSITIL)) are also housed in the Library Block. IoT Lab sponsored by Kerala Start Up Mission and the Parent Teacher Association provides services such as 3d printer access, rental of electronics components etc.

== Technical & Cultural Festivals ==
=== Dyuksha (Techno-cultural Fest) ===
Dyuksha is a National Techno-cultural festival organized by NSS College of Engineering. It is the successor of Gamaya (last organized in 2014) and has been held in 2018,2020 and 2023.

=== AGAM (Inter-department Arts Fest) ===
AGAM (earlier known as NOOPURAM) is the annual inter-department arts fest conducted since the college was affiliated to the University of Calicut, and has continued even after the establishment and subsequent affiliation to APJ Abdul Kalam Technological University.

=== Pelicula (Film Festival) ===
Pelicula was a film festival organized by theatre society of NSSCE. It is now organized by the film and drama club of NSSCE and is part of the pre-event programs of Dyuksha.

== Placements ==
The college being the oldest institute in Palakkad district has a network of alumni spread around the world. This helps in bringing companies from various industries for recruitment. Placements in NSSCE are categorized into: Core-engineering, IT, Management & Banking.

=== PTIB ===
Placement Training & Information Bureau is the organizing body for all recruitment drives and training programs held in the Campus. It is located in a dedicated building and has additional seminar hall facilities in the Alumni Block. All major recruiters visit the campus year after year and the college leads the placement counts in Palakkad.

== Department of Physical Education ==
NSS College of Engineering is known for its achievements in various sporting events across the state. It dominates the APJ Abdul Kalam Technological University Athletics Meets. The Department of Physical Education conducts various events including the Annual Sports Meet, Cricket Premier League, Sevens Football, Basketball, Volleyball and Badminton events. NSSCE ground is one of the best cricketing pitches in Palakkad and hosts several cricket matches and has been venue for the revenue district team of Palakkad. Other facilities include Indoor Stadium, Basketball Court, Volleyball court, etc. There are other playgrounds and courts adjoining the hostel buildings.

== Clubs and Activities ==
The college has many professional chapters and clubs with very active members. Some of them are listed below

=== National Service Scheme ===
There are two units of NSS(Units 128 &198) at NSS College of Engineering. Both the units are government aided units under the APJ Abdul Kalam Technologicaal University NSS Cell. The units were previously affiliated to the Calicut University NSS Cell. Unit 198 was awarded best unit by University NSS Cell in 2021. The unit has also received Best volunteer and Best Program Officer awards in 2021. Other notable achievements include selection of its volunteer secretary to the NSS Republic Day Parade Camp, 2022.

The units are further divided into 5 functional units: Unarv, Pratheeksha, Samrudhi, Urja and Santhwanam

=== Qpounce - Quiz Club ===
Qpounce is the Official Quiz Club of NSS College of Engineering. It hosts numerous formal and informal events in the campus including the annual Noopuram Gen Quiz and Monthly informals. The club was brought under the supervision of the College Union in the year 2022.

=== ELACSTA ===
ELACSTA is an Electronics and Communication Department Students Association of NSS College of Engineering, Palakkad. It was formed in the year 2017 by the joint initiative of the faculty and staff members of the department.

=== Wildlife & Forestry Club ===
Wildlife & Forestry Club was introduced in 1991, by a set of students of Electrical and Electronics branch. Aim of the club is to create awareness of nature and its resources.

=== Reels Club ===
The club was formed during the COVID-19 pandemic and is successor to the theatre society which was active in campus earlier.

=== Celestia (Space Club) ===
Celestia is the official space club of the college. It is a hobby club working under the college union and conducts various astronomical events.

== See also ==
- List of engineering colleges in Kerala
- List of Educational Institutions of Nair Service Society
- List of educational institutions in Palakkad district
