= College of Engineering Muttathara =

College of Engineering, Muttathara
- Type: Government
- Established: 2016
- Affiliations: Kerala Technological University
- Principal: Dr. V Praseedalekshmi
- Location: (India) Muttathara, Kerala

The College of Engineering Muttathara (In Malayalam - എഞ്ചിനീയറിംഗ് കോളേജ്, മുട്ടത്തറ), (Entrance Commissioner's Code: CEM) is the ninth Engineering College started in 2016 under the Co-operative Academy of Professional Education (CAPE Kerala) Society. The society promoted by the Co-operation Department of the government of Kerala is an autonomous society.

The college is located at Muttathara (near St. Sebastian Church, Vallakadavu) of Thiruvananthapuram district. The college is about 4 km from Trivandrum Central Railway Station and very near to Thiruvananthapuram International Airport.

The Courses offered are B.Tech in Civil Engineering, Mechanical Engineering, Electrical & Electronics Engineering, Computer Science & Engineering and Electronics & Communication Engineering. It is affiliated with APJ Abdul Kalam Technological University.

== Admission ==
Admission is through Central Counseling by the Government of Kerala. Candidates are admitted based on the state-level Common Entrance Exam (KEAM) conducted by the CEE From 2003.

== Courses ==
The institution offers B.Tech courses in

- Civil Engineering
- Computer Science & Engineering
- Electronics and Communication Engineering
- Electrical and Electronics Engineering
- Mechanical Engineering

== The annual intake for each course ==
- Civil Engineering - 60
- Computer Science & Engineering - 120
- Electronics and Communication Engineering - 60
- Electrical and Electronics Engineering - 60
- Mechanical Engineering - 60

== Location ==
The college is located only 3.5 km from heart of the Trivandrum City: East Fort. You can reach the college by bus or by personal vehicle. The college is located only 4 km from Trivandrum Central Railway Station and Trivandrum Airport.

== See also ==
- List of Engineering Colleges in Kerala
