= College of Engineering Attingal =

Engineering college in Kerala, India

College Of Engineering, Attingal
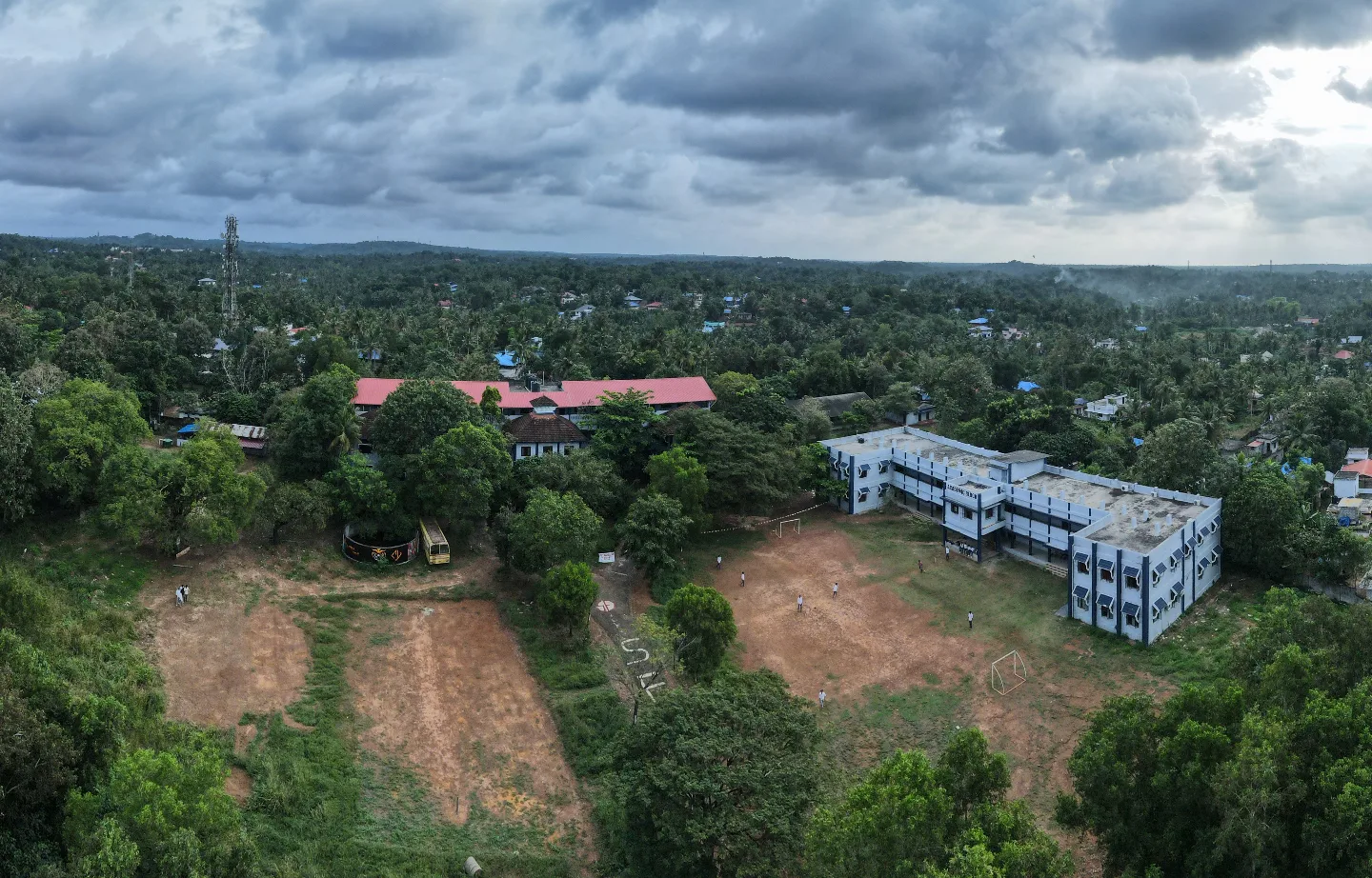
- Type: Government Aided College
- Established: 2004
- Affiliations: KTU
- Principal: Dr. Suma LS
- Location: Trivandrum, Kerala, India; 8°41′27.837″N 76°49′10.1274″E
- Acronym: CEAL
- Website: ceal.in
- Location in Kerala, India

College of Engineering, Attingal, commonly known as CEAL, was established by the Institute of Human Resources Development in 2004, undertaken by Government of Kerala. The college is situated in Attingal and affiliated to KTU and is approved by All India Council for Technical Education. CEAL was previously affiliated to the Cochin University of Science and Technology (CUSAT) until 2015.

== Location ==
CEAL is situated in the heart of Attingal, which is approximately 28 kms from Trivandrum Central and 38 kms from Kollam.

== Admission ==
Admission to the courses is on an annual basis and is based on the All Kerala Common Entrance Examination conducted by the Controller of Entrance Examinations, Government of Kerala. The admissions to the free/merit seats and management seats are through the Central Allotment Process conducted by the Controller of Entrance Examinations, Government of Kerala. The proportion of seats are as follows: free/merit seats 50%, management seats 35% (as aforementioned allotment to both these categories are through the Central Allotment Process), the remaining 15% seats come under the NRI quota.

== Departments ==
There are 4 departments, with an annual intake of 300 students.

Department	Number of seats
Electronics and Communication Engineering	60
Computer Science and Engineering	120
Electrical and Electronics Engineering	60
Artificial Intelligence and Machine Learning	60

== Club activities ==
=== TinkerHub CEAL ===
Founded in 2025, TinkerHub CEAL is a student-led community focused on peer learning, collaboration, and innovation. The club aims to create an inclusive environment where students can learn together, share knowledge, and develop technical as well as professional skills through community-driven initiatives.

The chapter actively promotes open-source culture, technology awareness, and resource sharing by organizing workshops, learning circles, hackathons, and networking opportunities. Through its activities, TinkerHub CEAL encourages students to explore emerging technologies, contribute to open-source projects, and build meaningful connections.

Currently, the club is led by Lekshmy S Raju as the Campus Lead.

=== Alchemy IEDC CEAL ===
Founded in 2015, the entrepreneurship club let students explore startups and innovate novel ideas. They have been known to promote innovative ideas like Automated Hand Sanitizer during Covid-19 lockdown era.

In 2023, the club went through a major rebrand, and became known as Alchemy IEDC CEAL. Under the new leadership the club took initiative to run their Flagship State Level startup conclave named "Enigma". Other events like Unravel, Wolf Talks etc have helped the club make its mark in modern urban startup environment.

Currently, the club with over 100 members is led by Nihal Naeem under the mentorship of its previous lead Roshan Syed.

=== FOSS Cell CEAL ===
Founded in 2021, FOSS Cell CEAL, under the ICFOSS Kerala, represents the Open-Source community of CEAL promoting tech and creative literacy through the means of open-source software.

In 2024, FOSS Cell started the chambers initiative focusing on domains like, Design and Creativity, Hardware and Embedding, Software Development and AI, Tech Competitions and Hackathons, and Cloud and Deployment via Create 101, Embed 202, Train 303, Hack 404, Deploy 505 respectively. The chambers of FOSS provides a platform for students to explore technology in an open-source way.

Currently, the club is led by Adithyan UP & Lakshmi G Nair as the Chief FOSS Ambassador under the mentorship of its previous lead Harigovind.

== See also ==
- List of Engineering Colleges in Kerala
- KEAM
