= C-DAC Thiruvananthapuram =

Indian computing development centre

Centre for Development of Advanced Computing Thiruvananthapuram
- CDAC-T
- Field of research: High Performance Computing, Multi-lingual Computing and Heritage Computing, VLSI and Embedded Systems, Cyber Security, Professional Electronics, Software Technologies, Health Informatics, Education
- Location: P.B.NO:6520, Vellayambalam, Thiruvananthapuram - 695033, Kerala, India, Thiruvananthapuram, India
- Operating agency: Ministry of Electronics and Information Technology, India
- Website: www.cdac.in

The Centre for Development of Advanced Computing, Thiruvananthapuram (C-DAC[T]) is a branch of the Indian Centre for Development of Advanced Computing based in Thiruvananthapuram.

It is a National Centre of Excellence, pioneering application oriented research, design and development in Electronics and Information Technology.

== Major development groups ==
=== Language Technology Section ===
This section under the C-DAC is specialized in Indian language speech, natural language processing and assistive technologies.

==== Major products ====
- Malayalam speech synthesis add-on for NVDA
- Malayalam Automatic Speech recognition system
- Indian Language handwriting recognition system
- Mithram an android application for people with ALS or for those which difficulty in speech.

=== Power Electronics Group ===
Power Electronics is a part of industrial control and is a major thrust area for C-DAC. The activities of the group are focused on Custom Power Devices, Power Controllers for tapping energy from non-conventional energy sources like wind and solar, Electric and Hybrid Vehicles, Automotive Electronics, Systems for Industrial Automation, Digital Controllers and Power Control Systems for Industrial application, Networking of Power Electronic systems and the Development of industrial control products like Variable Speed Drive systems, High Performance Uninterruptible Power Supply systems, High efficiency Switched Mode Power Converters, and Remote Controlled Mobile platforms.

In addition to technology development projects, the group undertakes contract projects for industries. The centre also acts as the nodal centre for the National Mission on Power Electronics Technology (NaMPET).

=== National Mission on Power Electronics Technology (NaMPET) ===
NaMPET is a national mission programme launched in November 2004 by the Department of Information Technology (DIT) under Ministry of Communications & Information Technology, Government of India. The five-year programme is implemented through the Nodal Centre at the Centre for Development of Advanced Computing. Academic institutions in the country, manufacturing industries and user industries of Power Electronics Systems participate in the programme. A National Steering Committee composed of experts from agencies and institutions in India guides the activities of NaMPET.

==== Major technologies ====
- Vehicle Control Unit and Train Communication Network for Indian Railways
- Universal Auxiliary Converter for Rolling Rolling Stock Applications
- Smart Energy Meters for Advanced Metering Infrastructure
- Low Voltage Direct Current (LVDC) Architecture for various applications

=== Broadcast and Communication Group ===
The group is involved in the design and development of products and technology for Broadcast and Communication applications.

The group has launched a range of products/technology in the last decade which have been used by All India Radio, Doordarshan, State Electronics Development Corporations, Airport Authority & Telecommunication Department.

The group has expertise in product development with mixed mode signal processing for embedded application and is involved in developing products in Digital Audio, Broadband Access, TETRA, Wi-MAx, VOIP, Bluetooth and Digital Mobile Radios.

=== Hardware Design Group ===
The Application Specific Integrated Circuit (ASIC) Design Centre is an embedded centre of the Centre for Development of Advanced Computing, set up with the objective of application-oriented R&D for electronics products, systems and technologies. Since its inception in 1989, the ASIC Design Centre has been active in the design of high-complexity ASICs and ASIC-based products. The centre is equipped with facilities for design of VLSI ASICs from concept to silicon.

Hardware Design Group was part in development of VEGA Microprocessors. These are high performance processors based on the open source RISC-V Instruction Set Architecture.

=== Strategic Electronics Group ===
Strategic Electronics Group (SEG) has a team of 50 with skill sets for embedded product / system design. This group has acquired in house competence for total product design and technology transfer for ready to market products. This group has infrastructure and tools to support the design and development activity in the embedded product development and digital signal processing, including total package design. Main products from SEG are Echo sounder, Bottom profiler, Remotely Operated Submersible, Water level sensor, Side scan sonar, MRI, Sounds, SWAMS, Under Water Ranges etc.

Main products are PEARS (Programmable platform for Experiments and Academic Research on SDR)

- Echosounder
- EMLOG
- UDMS
- SWAMS
- SOUNDS
- MRI
- Landmine Detection System
- Gunshot Detection System
- Remotely Operated Submersible
- Precision Water Level Sensor
- NDT Systems
- ACOTO

=== Control and Instrumentation Group ===
The thrust area of the group is the application oriented research and development activity relating to Control and Instrumentation. Communication being very important for effective control, plant wide networking is also added to the thrust area of the group.

=== Medical Informatics Group ===
'Medical Informatics' is the application of computer technology to medicine such as health care, medical research and medical teaching.

The mission of 'Medical Informatics' is to carry out research on health technology, telemedicine, bio-medical imaging and applications relevant to environments in developing countries.

Medical Informatics: core activities

- Tele-Medicine
- Hospital Management System
- Hospital Information System
- Data Management System for health care
- Data mining and Knowledge Management System for health care
- Medical Protocol implementation
- Picture Archival and Communication System
- Bio-Medical Signals and Imaging research
- Human Resource Portal & Payroll Management
- Public Health Informatics
- Hand-held Environments for health care
- Embedded systems for health care
- National Health Care Technology initiatives
- Industrial and Consumer Electronics Consultancy
- Mobile Telemedicine vehicle design

=== Software Training and Development Centre ===
Software Training and Development Centre (STDC) is a major division of C-DAC. R&D and advanced technology training are the two major areas of focus which have resulted in development of products such as open source software, multilingual tools, and different training courses.

The courses offered includes Diploma in Cyber Security & Forensics, Diploma in Web Technologies and Diploma in Embedded Systems & IoT in addition to the Certificate courses on IBM Mainframe, Web Technology, Database Technology, Internet Technology, Cyber Security & Forensics, Ethical Hacking and E-Governance.

KRC is located at three places. Two places in Thiruvananthapuram at Vellayambalam & Technopark and the third is near to Shenoy's Junction, MG Road, Ernakulam (Kochi). STDC, Technopark Campus offers various short term courses and placement oriented diploma programs which includes Cyber Forensics and IoT. Kochi Centre is majorly concentrating on IT courses like, Dot NET Technologies using MVC, Java, Advanced Java, Java and Android Programming, PHP, C programming, C++ programming etc. STDC also undertake corporate course for different offices on their requirements. KRC provides guidance on final projects and In-plant training to students.

== ER & DCI Institute of Technology ==
ER&DCI IT
- ER&DCI
- Type: Education and research institution
- Established: 2001
- Affiliations: A P J Abdul Kalam Technological University (2014-) Cochin University of Science and Technology (2001-2014)
- Academic affiliations: AICTE, KTU
- Principal: Rajasree S
- Director: Alexander G
- Postgraduates: 72
- Location: Thiruvananthapuram, Kerala, India; 8°30′34″N 76°57′41″E
- Website: www.erdciit.ac.in

ER&DCI Institute of Technology (ER&DCI IT) is an educational institution under the direct control of Centre for Development of Advanced Computing (CDAC), Thiruvananthapuram. The institute is located on the campus of CDAC, in the heart of Thiruvananthapuram city. The institute is affiliated to the Kerala Technological University and has the approved by All India Council for Technical Education (AICTE).

ER&DCI IT began in 2001, with the MCA Programme with the motive of imparting training in Information Technology and other related areas through the three year MCA programme. The programme was structured with differences from the regular MCA programmes offered by other institutes. Hands on experience of live projects at the R & D laboratories of CDAC is aimed at preparing the students to take up work in the industry. MCA has been discontinued, the last batch will pass out in 2014.

== Academic programmes ==
=== Postgraduate Programmes ===
==== Masters in Technology (M.Tech) ====
- VLSI & Embedded Systems
- Computer Science with Specialization in Cyber Forensics and Information Security

== Admissions ==
Admissions to the M.Tech. courses are made through the GATE (graduate aptitude test in engineering).

== See also ==
- List of engineering colleges in Kerala
