= G. Girish =

Indian judge

Justice G. Girish

Judge, Kerala High Court
- Succeeded by: President of India

Personal details
- Born: 17 May 1967 (age 59) Kerala
- Education: Government Law College, Thiruvananthapuram
- Occupation: Judge
- Known for: Being judge of Kerala High Court

Justice G. Girish (born 17 May 1967) is an Indian judge serving in the Kerala High Court.

== Early life and education ==
Girish was born on 17 May 1967 in Kerala, India. He completed his early education at N.S.S College, Pandalam, and went on to study law at the Government Law College in Thiruvananthapuram. After completing his law degree, he enrolled as an advocate in December 1990 and began practicing law in Adoor. Girish was sworn in as an Additional Judge of the High Court of Kerala on 25 October 2023.

He was appointed as a permanent judge of that high court from 1 September 2025.
