= Rajadhani Institute of Engineering and Technology =

Technical college in Nagaroor, India

Rajadhani Institute of Engineering & Technology
- RIET
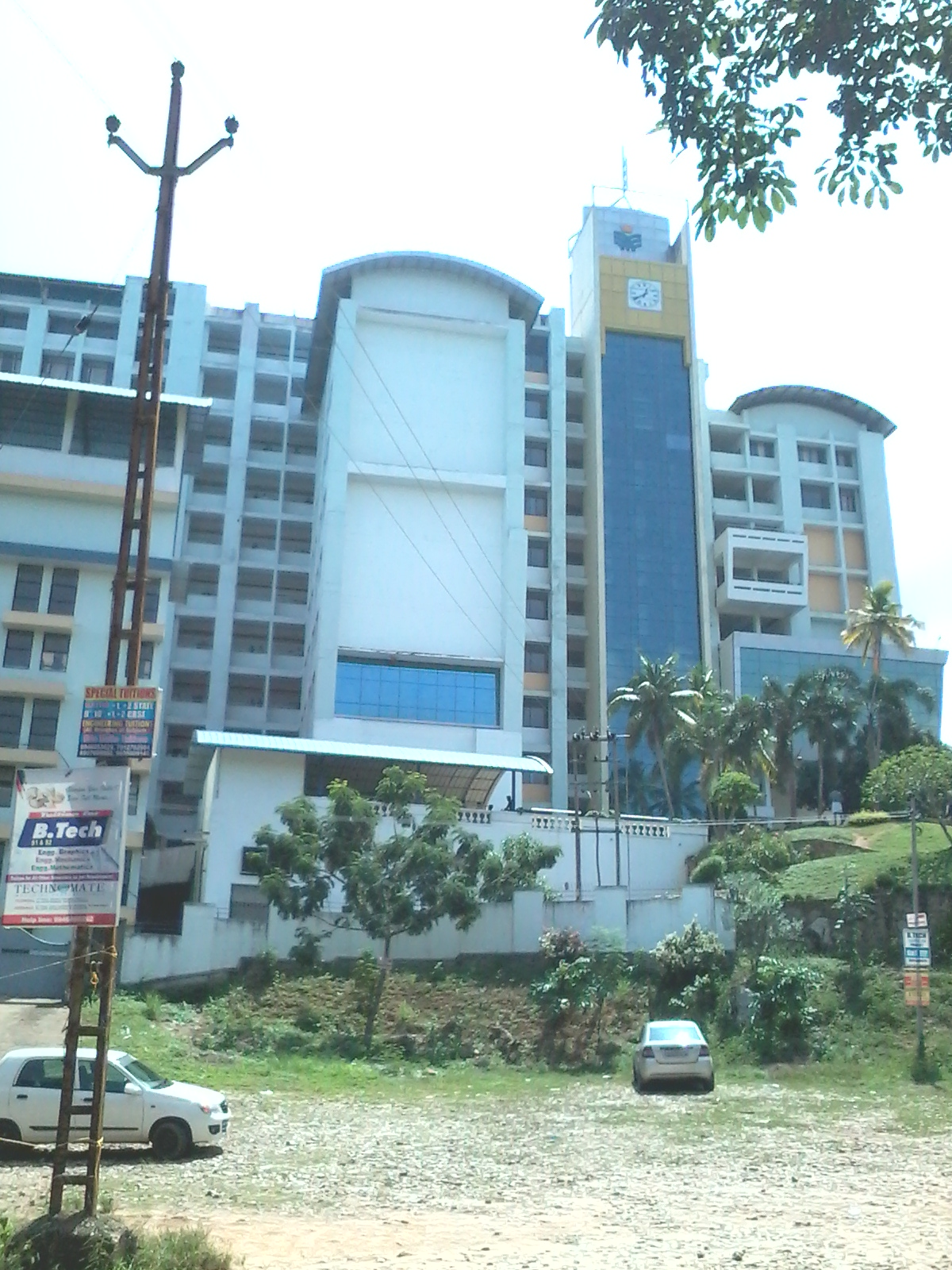
- Front view of the college
- Type: Private Self Financing
- Established: 2009
- Affiliations: APJ Abdul Kalam Technological University
- Chairman: Dr.Biju Ramesh
- Principal: Dr. Madhukumar.S
- Students: 1500
- Location: Nagaroor, Thiruvananthapuram, Kerala, India; 8°44′12″N 76°50′4″E
- Campus: 10 acres (40,000 m^{2})
- Nickname: RIET
- Website: riet.edu.in

Rajadhani Institute of Engineering & Technology (RIET) (Autonomous), Established in 2009, is a private self-financing technical institution at Nagaroor, Thiruvananthapuram, India. It is affiliated to APJ Abdul Kalam Technological University, and is approved by the All India Council for Technical Education. The Institution was Granted Autonomous Status By UGC India On The Year 2025-26

== Courses ==
The college offers the following graduate and postgraduate courses:
B.Tech Degree courses:

- Aeronautical Engineering (60 seats)
- Civil Engineering (60 seats)
- Computer Science and Engineering (180 seats)
- Electronics and Communication Engineering (60 seats)
- Electrical and Electronics Engineering (60 seats)
- Mechanical Engineering (60 seats)
- Robotics and Automation (60 seats)
- Cybersecurity (60 seats)

Postgraduate level:

- Structural Engineering (18 Seats)
- Geo-Technical Engineering (18 seats)

Polytechnic

- Electrical and Electronics Engineering (60 seats)
- Mechanical Engineering (60 seats)
- Civil engineering (60 seats)
- Automobile Engineering (60 seats)
- Computer Technology (60 seats)

== Start-ups ==
Rajadhani Institute Of Engineering And Technology was successful in promoting the technical as well as the entrepreneurial mindset in the students. Examples are:

- Travancore Majestic
- Rajadhani Hi-Tech Equipments
- CE SQUARE
- KARMA RESEARCH LAB
- E4S (Engineering 4 solutions)
- .AST
