= University College of Engineering, Kariavattom =

College in Kerala, India

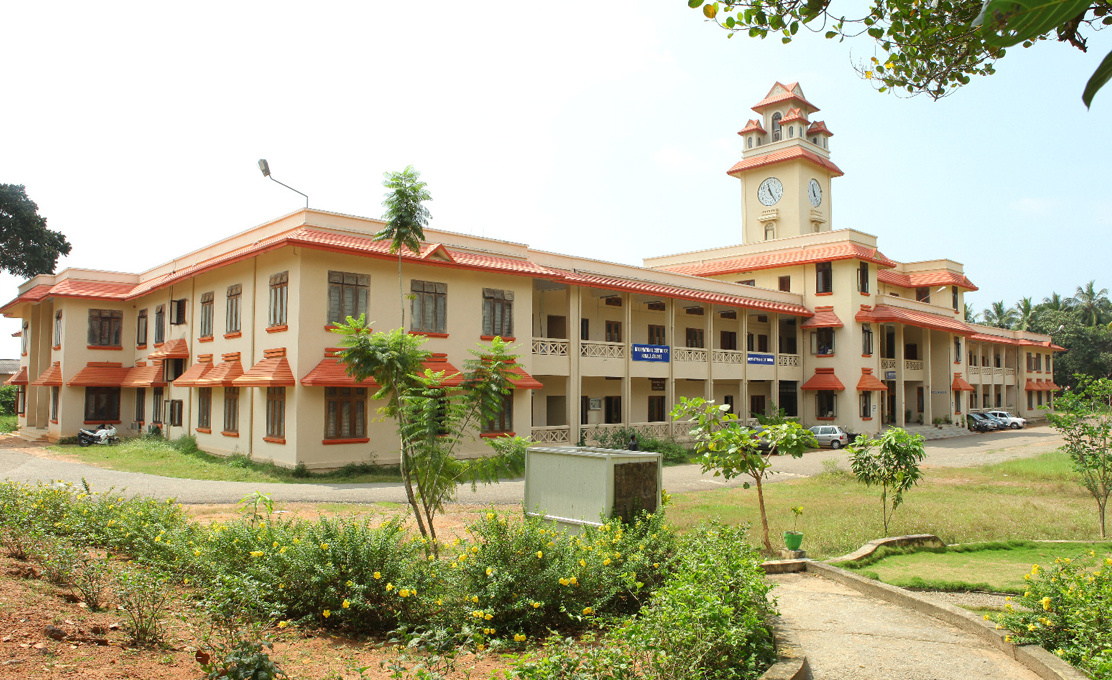
- Motto: Karmaṇi Vyajyate Prajñā(sanskrit)
- Motto in English: Wisdom manifests itself in action
- Type: Constituent College of the University of Kerala.
- Established: 2000
- Affiliations: University of Kerala, AICTE
- Chancellor: Governor of Kerala
- Vice-Chancellor: Dr. Mohanan Kunnummal
- Principal: Dr. Vijayakumar Narayanan
- Pro-Chancellor: Roji M. John (Minister for Higher Education)
- Faculty: 60
- Students: 1000+
- Location: Kariavattom, Thiruvananthapuram, Kerala, India; 8.5644°N 76.8845°E
- Campus: 359 Acres
- Website: uck.ac.in
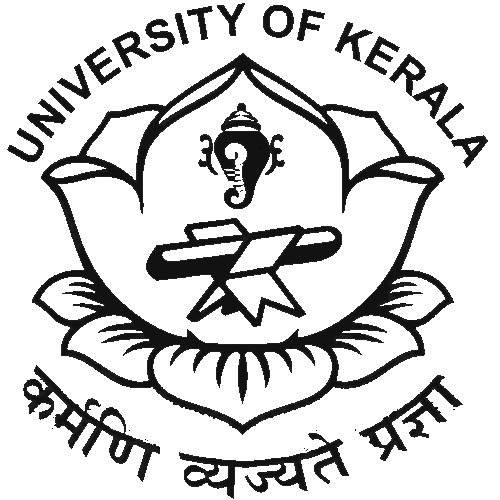

University College of Engineering, Kariavattom abbreviated as UCEK, is a Government of Kerala controlled Engineering College, directly managed by the University of Kerala. The institute was established in 2000 by Government of Kerala, under the ownership of University of Kerala in Kariavattom Campus, Thiruvananthapuram. Foundation stone of this campus was laid by Sarvepalli Radhakrishnan, former President of India on 30 September 1963.It is the one and only constituent college of the University of Kerala.The Administration Panel of this college includes Governor of Kerala as Chancellor(University of Kerala), Minister in Government of Kerala for Higher education as Pro-chancellor(University of Kerala), Vice-chancellor of the University of Kerala, Registrar of the University of Kerala, Principal of the College.The 77th session of the Indian History Congress was held in this college in 2016. It was inaugurated by former President of India, Pranab Mukherjee.

As per Indian institutional ranking framework, In 2023 UCEK ranked in the 8th position among the best Government Engineering colleges in Kerala. After the establishment of APJ Abdul Kalam Technological University (formerly, Kerala Technological University) in 2014, UCEK is the only engineering college affiliated with the University of Kerala.

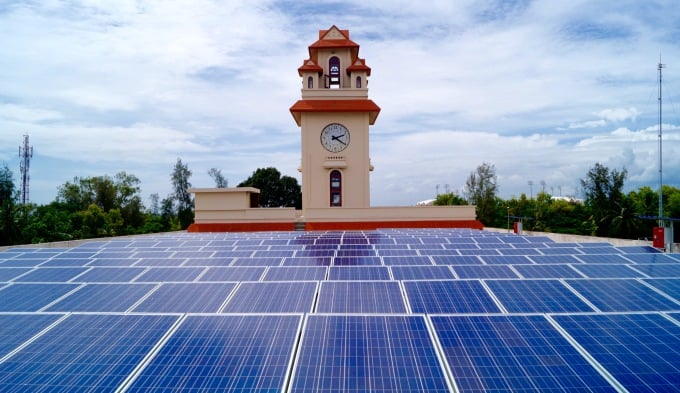
The 100 KW solar unit which has been fixed atop of the University college of engineering in Kerala University’s Kariavattom campus.

== History ==
The college was established in the year 2000 and is functioning in the Golden Jubilee Complex of the University of Kerala in the Kariavattom campus, Thiruvananthapuram.

== Departments ==
The institute offers four-year engineering undergraduate (B. Tech.) programmes in computer science and engineering, electronics and communication engineering, and information technology. The total number of student intake for IT & ECE limited to 65 seats and CSE has 120 seats(Admission providing through allotment by the Commissioner of Entrance Examinations), with half of the seats reserved as merit.

Department	Number of seats
Electronics and Communication Engineering	65
Computer Science and Engineering	120
Information Technology	65

== Student facilities ==
=== Library ===
The college has a dedicated library and is accessible to students at all times. It can accommodate around 150 users at a time. The books, journals, magazines and their back volumes, DVDs and all resources are available for the use of faculty and students of the institute. A student can issue up to a maximum of 3 books at a time for a duration of 15 days each.

=== Cafeteria and convenience stores ===
There are three canteens which provide food to students. The three cafeterias are located at three sides of the college for the convenience of the students.

The store supplies text books, practical manuals, note books, laboratory records, drawing instruments, and other stationery articles needed for the students, staff.

=== Transport facilities ===
The transport division in the college provides transport facility to students and staff. The college has got two buses operating in two different routes to cater to the needs of students coming from different parts of Thiruvananthapuram city. The two routes together cover almost all important points within the city.

=== Bank / ATM ===
A branch of State Bank of India is functioning inside the campus with its working hours are between 10am and 5pm. An SBI ATM is also provided near the main entry gate for the convenience of students.

=== Lab Facility ===
The college has a departmental based laboratories facility for the students. The major laboratories present within the campus include Communication Engineering Lab, Digital Signal Processing Lab, Hardware Interface Lab, Industrial electronics Lab, Internet Lab, Language Lab, Linear Integrated Circuit Lab, Microcontroller Lab, Microprocessor Lab, Network Lab, Multimedia Lab, Microwave Engineering Lab and MATLAB.

=== Kerala University Health Centre ===
A healthcare team including doctors, nurses and health workers works to provide health care services to students and staffs in need within the campus. Moreover, the campus is situated next to Kerala University Health Centre in case for any emergency.

=== Kerala university fee/cash counter ===
University of Kerala fee counter is functioning inside the campus. It works from 9:00 am to 3:30 pm.

=== India Post ===
India post kariavattom branch office is functioning within the campus.

== Student clubs and technical societies ==
The main clubs operating within the campus include:

=== IEEE Student Branch ===
An IEEE student body started functioning at the campus since 2020. A majority of student population are involved with the branch. A wide array of activities are conducted by the branch.

=== Research and development cell ===
The cell consists of a four-member research committee each from the four departments.

=== Innovation and Entrepreneurship Development Centre ===
The Innovation and Entrepreneurship Development Centre, nurtured by KSUM is set up within the campus serving as a catalyst for entrepreneurship at the institute by supporting and incubating entrepreneurial ideas.

=== Developer students clubs ===
Developer student clubs are university based community groups for students interested in Google developer technologies. The club organize seminars, study jams, workshops and quizzes throughout the year.

=== Free and Open Source Software Cell ===
The cell's activities are bound in participation with the members of the institutions and ICFOSS. These deeds of the Cell aim in promoting FOSS activities through a group of interested students and teachers of the institution, on a voluntary basis.

=== Career Guidance and Placement Cell ===
The Career Guidance and Placement Cell of the college is responsible for placement drives at the campus. The Cell includes the Coordinator and the committee members of each department. The major recruiters includes the likes of TCS, Infosys, UST Global, Wipro, IBM, Speridian and CTS.

== Kerala university toppers from UCEK ==
- First Rank in 2004 (B.Tech Computer Science & Engineering ) – Mr. Vineeth R Pillai.
- First Rank in 2005 (B.Tech Computer Science & Engineering ) – Ms. Deebu.
- Second Rank in 2005 (B.Tech Computer Science & Engineering ) – Mr. Hari Sankar.
- First Rank in 2007 (B.Tech Computer Science & Engineering )-Ms. Divya.
- First Rank in 2008 (B.Tech Computer Science & Engineering )-Mr. Sarthak Gupta.
- Second Rank in 2013 (B.Tech Computer Science & Engineering )-Ms. Aswathy.
- First Rank in 2015(B.Tech Information Technology ) – Mr. Karthik R.
- Eighth Rank in 2015(B.Tech Electronics & Communication) – Mr. Aneesh A S.
- First Rank in 2020(B.Tech Information Technology ) – Mr. Anandakrishnan.

== College events ==
There are two main college fests that are conducted in UCEK. The Winter semester hosts the Snigdha Festivals and/or Renvnza.

Renvenza is an annual techno-cultural fest hosted by the students union as a part of the college event.

The Cultural Ace Fest is hosted throughout Summer semester.

In June 2024, the UCEK's Students Union announced that Bollywood actor Sunny Leone would be headling their "Renvnza" event. The announcement got widespread publicity, but shortly thereafter, the Vice-Chancellor of University of Kerala denied permission for Leone's appearance as headliner in the program.
