= Government Engineering College, Mananthavady =

College in Kerala, India

Government Engineering College, Wayanad
- Other name: GECW
- Type: Government College
- Academic affiliations: APJ Abdul Kalam Technological University
- Principal: JASMIN EA(2023–present)
- Location: Mananthavady, Kerala, India; 11°59′9″N 75°22′55″E
- Campus: 25 acres (100,000 m^{2})
- Website: www.gecwyd.ac.in

Government Engineering College, Wayanad is an engineering college established and managed by the Government of Kerala, India. It is affiliated to the APJ Abdul Kalam Technological University, and is approved by the All India Council for Technical Education (AICTE), New Delhi.[1]

== History ==
The college was inaugurated in 1999 with an intake of 120 students in Computer Science and Electronics and Communication Engineering. A new course on Electrical and Electronics Engineering started in 2010 with intake of 60 students and another course on Mechanical Engineering was started in 2014 with an intake of 60 students. The college is affiliated to A P J Abdul Kalam Technological University. It is the one and only engineering college in the entire district of Wayanad.

== Courses offered ==
There are five full time B.Tech. courses - Computer Science & Engineering with intake of 66 student, Electronics & Communication Engineering with intake of 132 student, Electrical & Electronics Engineering with intake of 66 student, Mechanical Engineering with intake of 66 student, and Civil & Environmental Engineering. Around 1300+ students are studying. There are two M.Tech. courses. M.Tech. in Communication Engineering & Signal Processing started in 2011 with intake of 18 students. A new M.Tech. course on Computer Science & Engineering with specialization in Networks and Security started in 2014 with intake of another 18 students. B.Tech. courses in Computer Science & Engineering, Electronics & Communication Engineering, Electrical & Electronics Engineering, Mechanical Engineering have been accredited by NBA (National Board of Accreditation).

== Faculty ==
The faculty are selected by the Public Service Commission, Kerala, on a merit basis.

=== Staff advisory system ===
Immediately after admission to the college, each student is assigned a staff adviser. The staff adviser guides the student in curricular and extracurricular activities during the period of study in the college.

=== Campus discipline ===
Any act of ragging is dealt with as per the provisions of the Kerala Prohibition of ragging Act, 1998. While on campus, students carry their college identity cards and comply with the dress code:

== The Campus ==
GEC Wayanad is located at Thalapuzha,7.3 km (4.5 mi) from Manathavady town. The college is located in the hilly district of Wayanad. The campus is spread across a vast area of 25 acres. Wayanad was formerly called the "Wayalnadu" of Kerala, which is the elevated picturesque plateau on the crest of the Western ghats. This college is one among the four new engineering colleges in the state established in 1999. It was inaugurated by the Hon. Education Minister, Mr. P.J. Joseph on 17 January 2000.

== Academics ==
=== Admissions ===
Admissions to the BTech Degree programs are carried out on the basis of rank in the common entrance examination conducted by the Government of Kerala.

=== Departments ===
The college is structured into seven departments:

- Electrical and Electronics Engineering
- Electronics and Communication Engineering
- Computer Science and Engineering
- Mechanical Engineering
- Civil and environmental engineering

== Community ==
- NSS (National Service Scheme)
- IEEE
- Natural club
- FLOSS cell
- Bhomithrasena club
- Alumni Association GECWWA
- ISTE
- Thinker Hub
- G-BOT(Robotics club)
