= Government Engineering College, Barton Hill =

College in Kerala, India

- Other name: GEC-BH
- Motto: Satyam Vadha Dharmam Chara
- Motto in English: Speak the truth, Lead a righteous life
- Type: Public engineering institute
- Established: August 1999 (27 years ago)
- Accreditation: National Board of Accreditation
- Academic affiliations: University of Kerala (1999–2015); APJ Abdul Kalam Technological University (since 2015)
- Principal: DR. SURESH K
- Location: Thiruvananthapuram, Kerala, India; 8.5052°N 76.9408°E
- Language: English, Malayalam
- Website: gecbh.ac.in

- Location within Kerala

Government Engineering College, Barton Hill (GEC-BH) is a public engineering college situated in Barton Hill, Thiruvananthapuram, India. Founded in 1999 by the Government of Kerala, it provides engineering programmes under the APJ Abdul Kalam Technological University, accredited to the National Board of Accreditation.

The institute has five major departments: Mechanical Engineering, Information Technology, Electrical and Electronics Engineering, Civil Engineering and Electronics and Communication Engineering. All these departments have obtained an NBA accreditation.

Two of its former principals, Dr. M. S. Rajasree and Dr. Ciza Thomas, were appointed as Vice Chancellors of Kerala Technological University. However, Dr. M. S. Rajasree’s appointment was later declared void ab initio by the Supreme Court of India. Dr. Ciza Thomas first served as the Interim Vice Chancellor of KTU, then moved to Digital University, and later returned as the permanent Vice Chancellor of Kerala Technological University in 2025 December.

The college is currently ranked second among the 138 colleges affiliated to APJ Abdul Kalam Technological University according to Academic Performance Index (API) report published by the university.

== Campus ==
The campus, situated centrally in the city of Thiruvananthapuram, is less than a kilometre from Palayam, and is located beside the Government Law College, Trivandrum. Two hostels are provided for women. The campus area is about 6 acres.

== Building construction ==
The college is housed in the old seven-storey buildings. The construction of the new eight-storey main block is continuing and construction of the Mechanical Lab Complex is complete. The work on the new Mechatronics Laboratary Complex being jointly set up by Mercedes-Benz and GEC, Trivandrum is underway.

== Intake ==
UG Programmes
Branch	Duration of program	Seats (first year intake)	Seats (lateral entry)
Mechanical Engineering	4 years	66	6
Civil Engineering	4 years	66	6
Electronics and Communication Engineering	4 years	66	6
Electrical and Electronics Engineering	4 years	66	6
Information Technology	4 years	66	6

Minor In Engineering (As per KTU-2019 scheme)
Department offering Minor	Basket	Required Credits	Eligibility	Title Of The Degree
Information Technology	BASKET I- WEB AND ANDROID DEVELOPMENT	20	Students from other branches of engineering(ECE, ME, CE, EEE).	B.Tech in Core Department with Minor in Information Technology
Information Technology	BASKET II -COMPUTER COMMUNICATIONS	20	Students from other branches of engineering(ECE, ME, CE, EEE).	B.Tech in Core Department with Minor in Information Technology
Information Technology	BASKET III- SOFTWARE ENGINEERING	20	Students from other branches of engineering(ECE, ME, CE, EEE).	B.Tech in Core Department with Minor in Information Technology

PG Programmes
Branch	Specialization	Duration	Annual Intake
Information technology	Artificial Intelligence & Data Science	2 years	18
Information technology	Network Engineering	2 years	18
Electronics and Communication	Signal Processing	2 years	18
Mechanical Engineering	Machine Design	2 years	18
Mechanical Engineering	Mechatronics	2 years	18
Electrical Electronics	Power System and Control	2 years	18
Electrical Electronics	Power Electronics and Drives	2 years	18
Translational Engineering	Translational Engineering	2 years	18

== Admissions and fees ==
All admissions are based exclusively on merit and arranged through the Centralized Admission Procedure (CAP) of the government of Kerala. All the students need to pay the fees only at the Government rate. Top rank holders of the Common Entrance Examination (CEE) conducted by government of Kerala opt for this college. In 2005, the admissions to the college started at rank number 254 in the Common Entrance Examination.

== Courses and curriculum ==
GECB, Thiruvananthapuram offers five B.Tech. courses in the streams of mechanical engineering (ME), electrical and electronics engineering (EEE), information technology (IT), civil engineering (CE) and electronics and communication engineering (ECE), each with an intake of 60 regular students and six lateral entry students per year.

GECB, Thiruvananthapuram offers four M.Tech. courses in Mechanical Engineering (ME) with specialization in Machine Design, Information Technology (IT) with specialization in Network Engineering, Electronics and Communication (ECE) with specialization in signal processing and electrical and electronics engineering with specialization in power system and control with an annual intake of 18 students per stream.

The college is affiliated to the APJ Abdul Kalam Technological University since 2015.

=== Mechanical Engineering ===
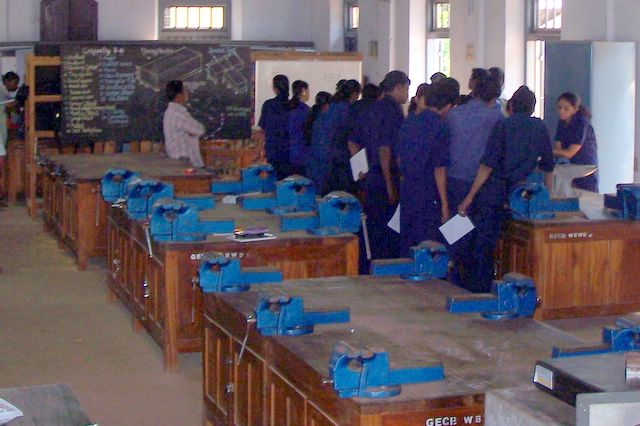
Mechanical workshop

The Mechanical Engineering block has been completed and houses machinery lab, the ADAM course classes and the main drawing hall.

The department has a workshop that caters to the need of the entire college.

- Mechanical Engineering Laboratory facilities include CNC machines (both lathe and milling machines), Toolmaker's microscope, profile projectors, sine bar and other measuring instruments. PLC programmer and Hydraulic power pack are the new additions in this lab. Programmable Robotic Arm will soon join the list. The Mechanical Engineering Lab of seventh semester is conducted in the lab.
- The Thermal Engineering Laboratory has heat transfer, refrigeration and air conditioning experimental setups. Heat transfer experiments include free convection, forced convection, composite wall, and heat exchanger apparatus. Performance study setup on blowers and multistage compressors are also available. The Thermal engineering lab of seventh semester is conducted in the lab.
- The Strength of Materials Laboratory has a testing machine, spring testing machine, hardness-testing machine and impact test machine. Torsion meter, torsion pendulum and moment of inertia setups are also included. The Civil Engineering lab of third semester is conducted in the lab.
- Apart from the mechanical workshop, the college has a Metrology Lab and Heat and Mass Transfer Lab and a high tech CAD Lab . To assist in intra disciplinary studies the institution has an Electrical Lab. An Engines lab and Hydraulics lab has been set up
- New lab with Lathe facilities is constructed

=== Information Technology ===
The four-year engineering degree in Information Technology that is being offered here is considered to be equivalent to Computer Science&Engineering degree since both of them share strikingly similar syllabi which is published by Kerala Technical University. An engineering degree in Information Technology focuses heavily on mathematical foundations of computer science and core computer science subjects like Data Structures, Algorithm Analysis, Compiler Design, Automata Theory, Computer Architecture, Computer Networks, Operating systems etc.Various government orders allow B.Tech IT graduates to claim equivalency with B.Tech. CSE degree.

The department offers two post graduate programs : M.Tech in Artificial Intelligence & Data Science and M.Tech in Network Engineering.

The Information Technology Dept has lab facilities that gives students opportunity to work on technologies like cluster computing, artificial intelligence, and multimedia processing.

The department has six lab rooms and a central server room. The department has the software and hardware infrastructure for the conduct of all the eight laboratory/practical subjects in the curriculum. Each laboratory room has networked printers over Ethernet LAN. Although the emphasis is on the use of Linux and open source software, other popular proprietary software platforms are also supported. In addition, the department provides technical support for the functioning of the campus-wide network in the college. A 1 Gbit/s internet connection is provided to the campus via a proxy server. The department is one of the nodal centers for the facilitation of the Centralized Allotment Process (cap) for admission to professional courses.

- The Server Room has five server machines with SCSI/SATAa drives, Raid-5 capability, CD towers, routers, hubs and cable modem, housed within a central rack. Different servers are set apart for managing various activities. The OS platforms provided are Enterprise Linux, Windows Server and Solaris. A software-testing Laboratory with HP Functional Testing software has been set up under the MODROBS project of AICTE.
- Programming Laboratory has 68 dual boot desktops with internet connectivity.
- Web Application Laboratory has 72 Windows based desktops with internet connectivity. This lab is also used for conducting online examinations of various government and non government organizations.
- The Internet Laboratory runs on thin-client machines running under Enterprise Linux as well as desktops running under Windows. 36 terminals are provided for Internet connectivity and running software labs in the curriculum.
- The Network Laboratory has eight cisco routers, switches, high speed modems and 36 dual-boot desktop machines. A wireless LAN laboratory with wireless access points/routers, wireless site survey kit and other equipment set up under the MODROBS project of AICTE.

The construction of a centralized internet facility and Multimedia Lab for 150 students is being conducted under the department.

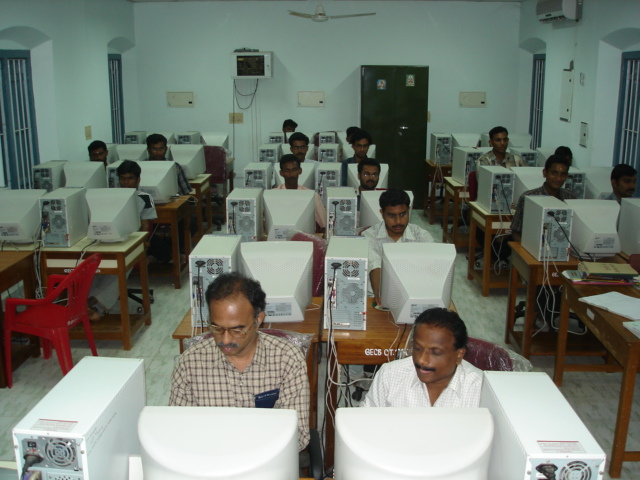
CADD lab(Old)

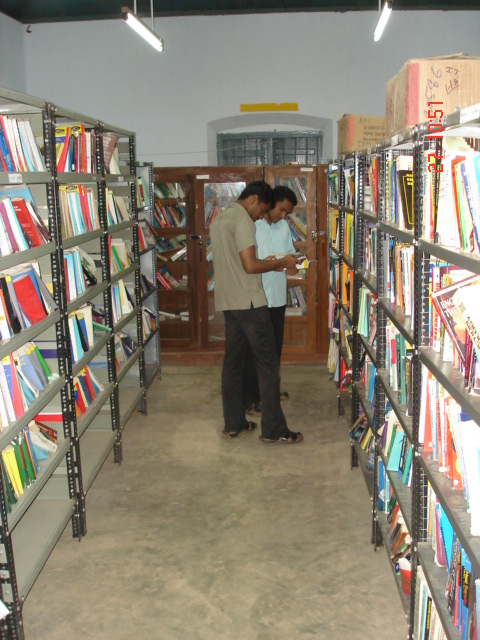
Old Library

The students of the department, of behalf of the Computer Society of India student branch GEC Barton Hill, conduct an intercollegiate technical competition named "Inceptra" in memory of the late Prof. Krishnankutty.

=== Electrical and Electronics Engineering ===
The Department of Electrical and Electronics Engineering at Government Engineering College, Bartonhill, was established in the academic year 2007, offering a four-year B.Tech. course in Electrical and Electronics Engineering. All the students are allotted from among the top-ranked students of Kerala Engineering Entrance Examination The department is planning to start a new M-Tech course in Advanced Power System and Control in the academic year 2012–13 . The first batch of students have already graduated in 2011 and more than 75 percent of the students were placed in national and international companies through the campus placement drive of the Career Guidance and Placement Cell of the college. Students from the department got selection for PG programmes in Indian Institute of Technologies and top ranked foreign universities.

Efforts are made to arrange lecturers in advanced areas of Electrical and Electronics Engineering by professors from IIT and IISc.

The laboratories in the department include Electrical Machines Lab, Electronic Circuits Lab, Measurements & Instrumentation Lab, Digital Circuits Lab, Microprocessor Lab and Electrical Workshop.

=== Electronics and Communication Engineering ===
The Department of Electronics and Communication Engineering has linkages with industry and scientific research organisations. Faculty and students engage themselves in technical conferences and have presented papers in journals and at conferences.

The facilities include Electronics Devices Lab, Analog Integrated Circuits Lab, Communication Engineering Lab, Microcontroller Lab, Communication Systems Lab, Digital Signal Processing Lab, Computer lab, Microwave and Optical Lab.

=== Civil Engineering ===
Civil engineers are problem solvers, meeting the challenges

of pollution, traffic congestion, drinking water and energy needs, urban redevelopment and community planning. engineers.

The Department of Civil Engineering was established in 2012 in the Government Engineering College, Barton Hill, with an annual intake of 60 students. The students are selected from the rank list of Kerala Engineering Entrance Examination conducted by the Office of the Commissioner for Entrance Examinations, government of Kerala. Visiting faculty programmes, invited talks by academicians, training programmes and quiz programmes are organised. A Civil Engineering Association enables the students to showcase their talents.

The department has labs such as:

- Strength of Materials Lab:

The machinery of the lab includes universal testing Machine, impact testing machine, Brinell Hardness Tester 3000kgf, Rockwell cum Brinell Hardness tester 187.5 kgf, spring testing machine, torsion pendulum, flywheel, torsion testing machine, and deflection beam apparatus.

- Survey Lab:

The survey lab has a collection of transit theodolites, electronic theodolite, dumpy levels, engineering chains, measuring tapes, plane table, prismatic compass, total station, planimeter, and subtense bar 2m.

- Concrete Lab:

Tests on cement, fine and course aggregates, fresh and hardened concrete etc. can be conducted in this lab. Environmental Engineering Lab Transportation Engineering Lab

== Placement statistics ==
Placement Statistics of the year 2022
Course	Department	Number of offers
B.Tech	Information Technology	143
B.Tech	Electronics & Communication Engineering	130
B.Tech	Electrical & Electronics Engineering	80
B.Tech	Mechanical Engineering	49
B.Tech	Civil Engineering	18
M.Tech*	All departments together	30

== Minor In Engineering ==
This is credential is being issued as per the 2019 scheme of KTU and 2015 scheme students of KTU did not have an option to do minor in other branches of engineering. This custom of minor in engineering is adapted from IIT/NIT curriculum.

== Mercedes-Benz India ADAM Course ==
Advanced Diploma in Automotive Mechatronics is a program initiated by Mercedes-Benz India in collaboration with Government Institutions across India. Candidates who have a Degree/Diploma in Mechanical Engineering / Automobile Engineering / Electrical & Electronics Engineering / Electronics & Communication Engineering / Mechatronics / Applied Electronics and equivalent disciplines. Final year B.Tech. students with 6.5 CGPA till seventh semester and without live back papers are also eligible. Admission to the course is through entrance test conducted at the college. The entrance test covers theory as well as practice.

== Faculty ==
The faculty members are drawn from the pool of Professors, Assistant Professors and Lecturers under the Department of Technical Education. It is the same pool which provides the faculty to all the nine Government Engineering Colleges in the state. The 50-strong faculty team of the college consists of 7 PhD holders and 28 PG degree holders. The faculty-to-student ratio in GEC Barton Hill is 1:15, which is better than the All India Council for Technical Education (AICTE) stipulations.

== Parent Teacher Association ==
The Parent Teacher Association (PTA) of the college is concerned with the functioning and development of the college. The PTA provides amenities to the students including the canteen and internet connectivity, and training programs to develop the soft skills of the students. The PTA gives scholarships to financially deprived students and awards to proficient students. A recent contribution of the PTA to the college is a new building with two classrooms.

== Notable alumni ==
- Haritha V. Kumar, IAS. She is the first woman from Kerala to secure All India Rank 1 in the UPSC Civil Services Examination.

== University results ==
- 2018-2022 Batch Result: The college ranks third among all the engineering colleges in Kerala in pass percentage as published by KTU.
- According to APJ Abdul Kalam Technological University results of third and fifth semester, 2017 the college has secured second position among 12 government/aided engineering colleges and fourth position among all 146 engineering colleges of the state.

== Library ==
The central library of the college houses 8000 books and periodicals including international journals and magazines. The process of fully computerizing the library, undertaken as a joint venture by the library and the IT department of the college using only free software has been completed. The campus has a subscription to online journals from American Society of Mechanical Engineers (ASME) and IEEE.

The students of the college can also make use of other libraries in the city such as the University Library, the Public Library and the British Council Library, all of which are a walking distance within a radius of 2 km from the campus.

== Connectivity ==
Three 100 MBPS broadband connect the campus to the web.10 Gbit/s optical fibre network connects the entire campus. Students and faculty are provided access to the Internet through a protected WiFi network. The college hosts a terminal of the EDUSAT educational communications satellite.

== Student activities ==
The democratically elected college union spearheads academic, cultural and sports activities of the students in the campus. Aagneya the intercollegiate Techno-cultural festival of the college started in 2008. There is a college arts festival and an annual college magazine. Apart from the college union, all the departments have a students association which organizes academic events pertaining to their branch.

There is a student chapter of the IEEE, ISTE and ASME in the college, which organizes technical seminars and related activities. The college has a team of students working to promote the use of free software among academia. They, along with the Society for Promotion of Alternative Computing and Employment (SPACE), have released a custom Linux distribution named FreeElectron, which provides (along with an operating system) software tools required in the ECE curriculum.

The college is a member of the Technology Incubation Centre of the government of Kerala, which conducts Entrepreneurship Development Programmes and assists the students in starting their own enterprises.

The college has clubs and forums for promoting student interaction which includes a quiz club and a unit of the National Service Scheme(NSS). The quiz team has represented the college in and outside the state.

The Physical Education Department students can use the facilities of the Department of Physical Education, University of Kerala and their stadium which is a kilometer from the campus. Arrangements have been made to practice athletics, football, volleyball and weight training equipments there. Students can practice basketball and handball at the Central stadium and ball badminton, and shuttle badminton and table tennis at Jimmy George stadium, which is about two kilometers from the campus. The construction of two badminton courts is progressing on the campus.

The basketball, football and cricket teams of the college have taken part in numerous competitions across the state and in inter-collegiate events organised by the university and won prizes.

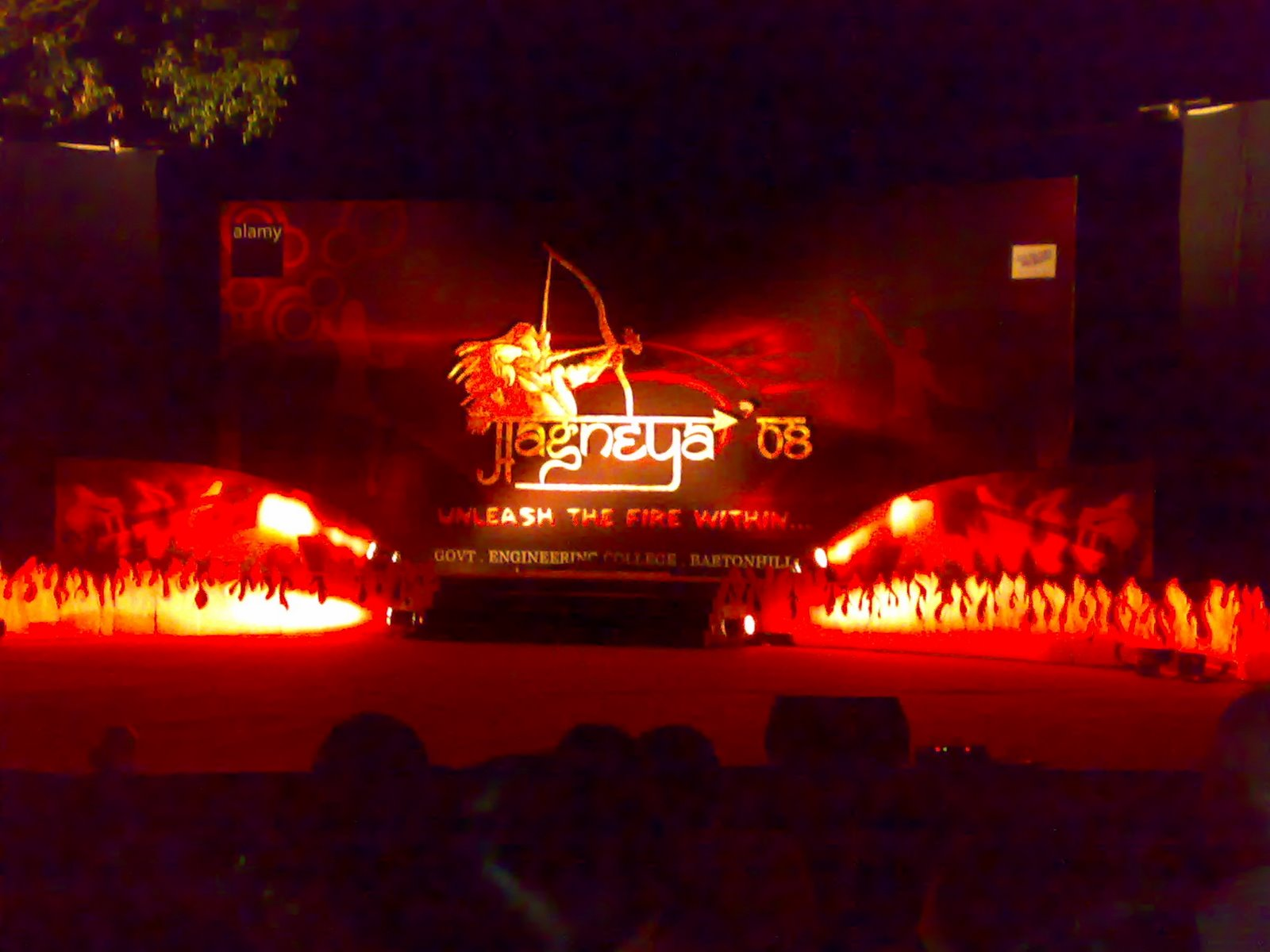
Aagneya 2008

=== Aagneya ===
Aagneya logo

Aagneya is an annual three-day festival held by the students of the college. It began in 2008, when the batch began a festival that would allow people of talents from all over the country to meet and partake in competition. Aagneya consists of cultural activities involving dance, music, art, literary and quizzing activities, as well as performances from professional artists. Aagneya means "Child of the Fire God" in Sanskrit. It celebrated its tenth edition in 2017.

As a part of Aagneya, a two-day camp called 'vaibhav' is held, aiming the specially abled people.

== Alumni ==
The college has a dynamic alumni association which involves actively on development and welfare of the college.

== See also ==
List of colleges in Kerala
