= Sahrdaya College of Engineering and Technology =

Engineering college situated in Kodakara, Thrissur District, India

Sahrdaya College of Engineering and Technology (Autonomous)
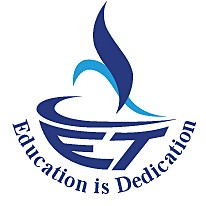
- Other name: SCET
- Motto: Education Is Dedication
- Type: Engineering College
- Established: 2002
- Accreditation: NAAC, NBA
- Affiliations: APJAKTU, AICTE
- Academic affiliations: University of Calicut (2002-2015); APJ Abdul Kalam Technological University (since 2015)
- Principal: Dr. Ramkumar S
- Director: Dr. Leon Ittiachen
- Executive Director: Rev. Fr. Dr. Anto Chungath
- Academic staff: 117
- Location: Kodakara, Thrissur, Kerala, 680684, India; 10.359501°N 76.2859103°E
- Campus: 45 acres (18 ha); Self-financing engineering college
- Website: sahrdaya.ac.in
- Location within Kerala Location within India

Sahrdaya College of Engineering and Technology is an Engineering college situated in Kodakara, Thrissur District which offers bachelor's (Biomedical Engineering, Biotechnology Engineering, Civil Engineering, Computer Science and Engineering, Electronics and Communication Engineering, Electrical and Electronics Engineering), Master's (Computer Science and Engineering, Embedded systems, Industrial Biotechnology) and Doctoral (Science, Technology, Engineering and Mathematics STEM) programs in Engineering and Technology. Sahrdaya is the "only Engineering College in Kerala, Consistently with above 80% pass" (2009, 2010, 2011) in the result analysis of engineering colleges at Kerala by the Department of Technical Education and University of Calicut under the direction of Hon High Court of Kerala in 2012. The college is run by the Syro-Malabar Catholic Diocese of Irinjalakuda. The college is affiliated to All India Council for Technical Education (AICTE) New Delhi, and the APJ Abdul Kalam Technological University.

Sahrdaya College of Engineering and Technology (SCET) was established in 2002, and is promoted by the Irinjalakuda Diocesan Education Trust, is an ISO 9001:2015 certified Institution. Sahrdaya also holds accreditation from NBA (BME, BT, CE, CSE, ECE, and EEE), NAAC and the Institution of Engineers (India), is considered one of the fastest-growing Engineering colleges in Kerala with recognition from the Department of Scientific and Industrial Research (DSIR) of Govt. of India as Scientific and Industrial Research Organization (SIRO). State of the art infrastructure of the institute is spread over 45 acres of green campus with a total build-up area of, 57854 sq.m.

On 22 August 2022, the BME, BT, CSE, and CE Departments got accredited with NBA accreditation status. Following this on 6 December 2023, the ECE Department also got NBA accreditation status.

In April 2024, The UGC conferred Autonomous status to the college for 10 years.

On 28 May 2025, Department of EEE also got NBA accreditation status. With that, Sahrdaya became Kerala's only autonomous engineering college with all UG programs NBA accredited.

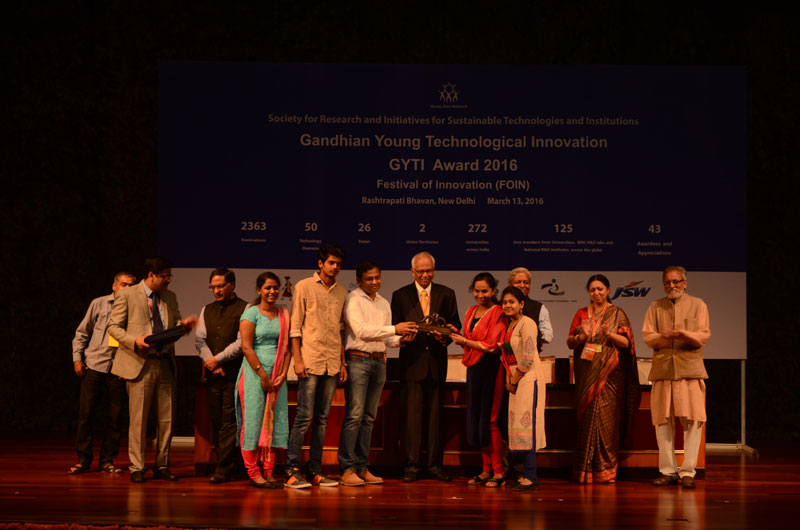
Sahrdaya Innovators receiving Gandhian Young Technological Innovation Award from Rashtrapti Bhavan, New Delhi

== Departments ==
- Applied Science and Humanities
- Biomedical Engineering
- Biotechnology Engineering
- Civil Engineering
- Computer Science and Engineering
- Electrical and Electronics Engineering
- Electronics and Communication Engineering

== Notable alumni ==
- Anju Raphael, CoFounder of InnovatorsFirst and Ditect.ai
