= ACE College of Engineering, Trivandrum =

Educational institution in India

ACE College of Engineering
- Motto: INSPIRED BY PURPOSE
- Type: AICTE approved
- Established: 2013
- Affiliations: University of Kerala, India & APJ Abdul Kalam Technological University, India
- Chairman: Dr. M.K. Kamaludeen
- Principal: Dr. Farrukh Sayeed
- Academic staff: 60+
- Students: 750+ (As of Jan 2018)
- Location: Trivandrum, Kerala, India; 8.437725°N 76.966667°E
- Campus: 6 acres (24,000 m^{2}), Urban
- Website: www.acetvm.com

ACE College of Engineering is an educational institution of engineering located in Pachalloor, Thiruvallom in Thiruvananthapuram, India. It offers engineering at Bachelor level. It is affiliated to APJ Abdul Kalam Technological University. Since 2015, its affiliated to the newly formed A P J Abdul Kalam Technological University. It is approved by All India Council for Technical Education (AICTE). All admission in controlled by AICTE and based on KEAM Entrance Exam (KEAM Code – MHP).

== Departments ==
The following departments offer Bachelor of Technology (B.Tech.)

- Aeronautical Engineering – 60 students per year
- Electronics & Communication Engineering – 60 students per year
- Electrical & Electronics Engineering – 60 students per year
- Civil Engineering – 60 students per year
- Mechanical Engineering – 60 students per year
- Computer Science & Engineering - 60 students per year
- Artificial Intelligence & Machine Learning - 60 students per year
- Mechatronics - 60 students per year

== Campus ==
The campus has two blocks, one for First Year Students and Main College Building . The college has tutorial rooms, drawing halls, library, computer centre, reading rooms, workshops and laboratories. The institute has a playground, a cafeteria and facilities like hostels, transport, medical care centre. Hostel facilities for men and women are available, where women hostel is inside the campus and gents hostel is outside 10 metre away from the college.

College is also equipped with incubation spaces under IEDC, IT rooms for the management of college technical side in the First Year Students Main College Building.

== Campus Life ==
This is a private institution so uniform is mandatory for every students. College start at 8:40 am and end at 4:10 pm, the campus is open to both faculties and students till 7:00 pm for activities such as sports, arts and more.

== Centre for Training and Placements ==
The Training and Placement Cell is staffed with full-time placement professionals. It offers students an employment placement and skill enhancement training. An MoU with Tata Consultancy Services on assistance in Placement and Training was signed which assures 50% placement in TCS and placement assistance to the rest for people entitled in the training program.

== Sports ==
The institute has indoor and outdoor sports facilities including badminton, volleyball, table tennis, and a gymnasium. The college hosted Kerala University Inter-Collegiate boxing championship in 2014.

== Certifications ==
The college was awarded ISO 9001:2008 Certification for Quality Management System by UKAS. The auditing was done by Intertek. In the year of 2024 college was awarded with NAAC A grade accreditation.
