= Vidya Academy of Science and Technology Technical Campus =

- Motto: Progress through education
- Type: Self-financing engineering college
- Established: 2013
- Affiliations: APJAKTU, AICTE
- Principal: Dr. T. Mathavaraj Ravikumar
- Location: Thiruvananthapuram, Kerala, India; 8°48′47″N 76°51′19″E
- Website: www.vidyatcklmr.ac.in Archived 2026-11-22 at the Wayback Machine

Vidya Academy of Science and Technology Technical Campus (VAST TC), is a privately financed engineering college in Thiruvananthapuram District in Kerala situated at Kilimanoor. The college offers a degree in Bachelor of Technology and courses in four branches of engineering - Civil, Computer Science, Electronics and Communication, Mechanical. The college was established and is administered by Vidya International Charitable Trust (VICT), a body formed by more than a thousand non-resident Keralites mostly based in the Arab States of the Persian Gulf.

Vidya Academy of Science and Technology Technical Campus is accredited by NAAC with "B++" Grade in 2022.

== Notable alumni ==
- Aneesh Tharayil - Bigg Boss (Malayalam TV series) season 7 first runner up
- Dev Mohan - Actor
- Indulekha Warrier - Playback Singer
- Manu Thekkinalil Saji - Athlete (Asian Games Silver Medalist)
- Sumesh Sundar - Kerala State Film Award for Best Choreography
