= College of Dairy Science and Technology, Mannuthy =

- Type: Engineering College
- Established: 1993
- Location: Mannuthy, Thrissur, Kerala, India; 10.5346°N 76.2625°E
- Website: www.kvasu.ac.in/college/more/4
- Location in Kerala College of Dairy Science and Technology, Mannuthy (India)

College of Dairy Science & Technology (CDST), Mannuthy, established in 1993 is a constituent college under the Faculty of Dairy Science and Technology of the Kerala Veterinary and Animal Sciences University (KVASU), a State Public University headquartered at Pookode in Wayanad district of Kerala.

== History ==
B.Tech. (Dairy Science & Technology) Programme, the first of its kind in the state was initiated in the year 1993 under the aegis of the Faculty of Veterinary and Animal Sciences of Kerala Agricultural University. Later it was upgraded to the status of a college in the year 1998. With the advent of the Kerala Veterinary and Animal Sciences University in 2010, the college was further upgraded to the status of an independent Faculty. College of Dairy Science & Technology (CDST) is one of the renowned institutions for Dairy education in the country. The Institute facilitates a close interaction between students, farmers, scientists, technocrats, and dairy industry such that all are mutually benefited. The college has endowed more than 350 Dairy professionals to the nation who are well equipped to take up challenging responsibilities in dairy industry, research institutes and academia.

== Academics ==
It offers B.Tech. programme in Dairy Science & Technology and Master of Technology (M.Tech.) programme in Dairy Technology. The candidates admitted to B.Tech. (DSc. & Tech.) programme are selected through the Common Engineering Entrance Examination conducted by Govt. of Kerala. The candidates who have passed the Higher Secondary Examination, Kerala or examinations recognized as equivalent thereto, with 50% marks in Mathematics separately, and 50% marks in Mathematics, Physics and Chemistry put together are eligible for admission. The college also admits students from ICAR quota for the UG programme. The admission to M.Tech. programmes is done through the Entrance examination conducted by the university and from the ICAR PG entrance examination held every year. One seat in the M.Tech. course is earmarked for student admitted under the Senior Residency programme.

== Courses ==
Course	Duration
B.Tech. (Dairy Science & Technology)	4 years (8 semesters) Intake-40
M.Tech. (Dairy Technology)	2 years (4 semesters) Intake-4 + 1(Senior Residency)

== Pedagogy ==
The course curricula for B.Tech. (Dairy Science & Technology), is prepared in lines with the pattern specified by the Indian Council for Agricultural Research (1.C.A.R), New Delhi as a unique job oriented degree programme. The total duration of the course is eight semesters. The last semester is set apart for In-plant training and Farm training. The total credits have been apportioned to Dairy Technology, Dairy Engineering, Dairy Chemistry, Dairy Microbiology, Dairy Business Management, Dairy Extension and Dairy Husbandry disciplines with due weight for each.

Students are exposed to the entire operations taking place in the KVASU Dairy Plant and through internship in other professionally managed co-operative and private dairy processing plants (Milma, Amul, Schreiber Dynamix, Mother Dairy etc.) which help them to acquire the required skills and confidence to work as highly motivated professionals. They are also enriched with entrepreneurial qualities to start their own industrial units. For this, they have to successfully complete a ‘Hands-on-training cum Experiential Learning Programme’ during the seventh semester. A field-extension training organised in association with Dairy Development Department, Govt. of Kerala and Internship programme organized in dairy farms are also an integral part of the programme.

The M.Tech. programme is offered in the discipline of Dairy Technology in line with the syllabus and other guidelines stipulated by ICAR, New Delhi. One seat is reserved under Senior Residency system for M.Tech. programme. The selection for residency programme is done based on option and merit of the candidate.

== Life at CDST ==
Life at CDST is exciting and invigorating; class schedules, assignments, practical sessions, presentations, seminars, industrial visits etc. The college also gives priority to extracurricular activities, for students to develop their social, cultural and managerial skills outside the classroom. Co-curricular activities like Annual Arts’ Fest and College Sports Meet, Student's Union activities, Exhibitions, Conferences, Seminars, Technical Meets, Debates, Quiz competitions, etc. are organized aimed at the holistic development of student community.

The National Service Scheme (NSS) unit of the college undertakes various programmes aimed to improve the social commitment of students and their personality development. Programmes are arranged during World Milk day, Farmers’ day, Republic day and Independence Day celebrations. The 1(Kerala) Remount and Veterinary Squadron NCC unit located in the Veterinary College, Mannuthy trains both B. V. Sc and B.Tech. students for equestrian events.

== Study Tours ==
Study tours are an integral part of the B.Tech. academic curriculum. An All Kerala tour and an All India tour are organized to facilitate the students to visit the most important Dairy and Food plants and other important institutions across the county. Apart from these, study tours are also organized as part of the various courses. It includes trips to dairies, packaging industries, dairy farms and other such institutes concerned.

== Campus Placements ==
Reputation of this institution is among the top academic institutions in dairy processing education and research; credit goes to the B.Tech. and M.Tech. graduates who brought laurels to this institution. Campus recruitment programmes are conducted for final year students/graduates every year. Reputed firms like Almarai in Saudi Arabia, Schreiber Dynamix Dairies, ITC Foods division, Milma, Hatsun Agro Products etc. recruit our B.Tech. graduates. Many graduates have joined the Dept. of Dairy Development, Govt. of Kerala as Dairy Extension Officers (on Direct Recruitment) and as Dairy Technologists/Quality Analysts in Dairy Plants of MILMA Federation/Unions across the state. Upon securing higher academic qualifications, many have joined as Academics/Scientists in reputed Central/State level Universities/Research institutions in the country.

Top recruiters include AMUL, NDDB, DFRL, Mother Dairy, Smithkline Beecham, Cadburys, Heinz, TUV SUD and Banking institutions such as SBI, ICICI, HDFC, IOB, PNB, SIB, Federal Bank etc.

== Professional Organizations ==
Indian Dairy Association (IDA) – Kerala chapter and the Association for Food Scientists and Technologists, India (AFSTI) – Thrissur chapter functions in the college. Indian Dairy Association (IDA) is a professional body which functions very closely with the dairy farmers, professionals and planners, scientists and educationists, institutions, and other organizations associated with the development of dairying in the country.

The Association of Food Scientists and Technologists, India (AFSTI) is one of the largest professional and educational organizations formed with the objective to stimulate and advance knowledge base on various aspects of Food Science and Technology.

== CDST Parent Teacher Association (CDSTPTA) ==
The Parent Teacher Association is a statutorily elected body which aims at the overall development of the college. The PTA aspires for co-operation and participation of parents in full measure in the activities of the institution. The PTA has been focusing on the growth and development of the college since its inception and takes an active role in supporting various student development initiatives.

== CDST Graduates'Association (CDSTGA) ==
CDST ensures the unrelenting supply of quality dairy professionals to meet the ever-growing necessity for improvement in Dairy/Food Processing sector till date. The graduates of the college formed an association named CDST Graduates’ Association (CDSTGA) during 2003, providing a comprehensive platform to involve actively in the welfare of college alumni, and work to support the milk producers and processors in the state. The members of the association are scattered across the globe. Alumni Reunion is organized every year under the aegis of CDSTGA.

Alumni Meeting was held on 18 March 2019, a new executive committee was selected in Annual General Body
