= Kerala Engineering Architecture Medical =

Post-secondary entrance examination series in the Indian state of Kerala

Coordinates: 8°29′37.444″N 76°57′8.8″E

Office of the Commissioner for Entrance Examinations – Kerala
- Abbreviation: CEE Kerala
- Purpose: Educational
- Headquarters: Thiruvananthapuram, Kerala, India
- Location: Office of the Commissioner for Entrance Examinations, 7th Floor, KSRTC Terminal, Thampanoor Thiruvananthapuram, Kerala
- Region served: Kerala
- Website: cee.kerala.gov.in/cee/

Kerala Engineering Architecture Medical, shortened as KEAM, is an entrance examination series for admissions to various professional degree courses in the state of Kerala, India. It is conducted by the Office of the Commissioner of Entrance Exams run by the Government of Kerala.

== Controversies ==
Following the COVID pandemic, a debate arose concerning the impartiality of the exam for students who followed the state syllabus. The government's response, altering the exam prospectus shortly before the release of rank list, proved inadequate. While purporting to benefit state syllabus students, this change negatively affected students following other curriculums. The affected students subsequently initiated legal proceedings in the high court, compelling the government to revert to the original prospectus and publish rankings.

== See also ==
- List of institutions of higher education in Kerala
- List of Engineering Colleges in Kerala
