= A. P. J. Abdul Kalam Technological University, Thiruvananthapuram =

Tertiary education institution in Thiruvananthapuram, Kerala, India

APJ Abdul Kalam Technological University
- Other name: KTU
- Type: Public
- Established: 2014; 12 years ago
- Affiliations: AICTE, UGC, AIU
- Budget: ▲₹372.51 crore (2026–27)(approximately US$39.08 million)
- Chancellor: Governor of Kerala
- Vice-Chancellor: Dr. Ciza Thomas
- Pro-Chancellor: Roji M. John (Minister for Higher Education)
- Students: 160,000+
- Location: Thiruvananthapuram, Kerala, India; 8.5416°N 76.9057°E
- Language: English
- Colours: Blue, Magenta, and Olive
- Website: ktu.edu.in

APJ Abdul Kalam Technological University (initially, Kerala Technological University) or KTU is a state public technological university headquartered at Thiruvananthapuram, Kerala, India.

KTU is an All India Council for Technical Education (AICTE) and University Grants Commission (UGC) approved university that offers undergraduate, postgraduate and doctoral degrees in engineering, technology, and management-related streams. Named after the Indian aerospace scientist and statesman A. P. J. Abdul Kalam in 2015, it is both an affiliation and teaching university, with more than 170 affiliated colleges and over 160,000 students enrolled, having jurisdiction over the 14 districts of Kerala.

It is a relatively new and reformed technological university, with its first batch enrolled in the academic year 2015–16.

== History ==
KTU was established by the Government of Kerala through an Ordinance on 21 May 2014. Kuncheria P. Isaac, a former Member Secretary of the All India Council for Technical Education, was appointed as the first Vice-Chancellor of the university on 1 September 2014, and M. Abdul Rahman, former All India Council for Technical Education Director, was appointed as the first Pro-Vice-Chancellor. Classes for the first batch under KTU began on 1 August 2015.

== Academics ==
The language of instruction is English. KTU offers degrees in undergraduate, postgraduate, and doctoral levels.

== List of vice chancellors of KTU ==
Vice chancellors of APJ Abdul Kalam Technological University
No.	Name	Term of office		
No.	Name	Assumed office	Left office	Time in office
1	Kuncheria P. Isaac	1 September 2014	2 January 2018	3 years, 123 days
(acting)	J. Letha	3 January 2018	4 October 2018	276 days
2	Usha Titus	5 October 2018	21 February 2019	139 days
3	M. S. Rajasree	22 February 2019	3 November 2022	3 years, 254 days
(acting)	Ciza Thomas	4 November 2022	31 March 2023	148 days
(acting)	Saji Gopinath	1 April 2023	27 October 2024	1 year, 209 days
(acting)	K. Sivaprasad	28 November 2024	17 December 2025	1 year, 19 days
4	Ciza Thomas	18 December 2025	Incumbent	281 days

== See also ==
- List of engineering colleges in Kerala
