= College of Applied Science =

College of Applied Science may refer to:

== Schools in India ==
- College of Applied Science (IHRD), 42 institutions under the supervision of the Institute of Human Resources Development in Kerala, India, including:
  - College of Applied Science, Kattappana
  - College of Applied Science, Thamarassery, in Korangad, Kozhikode district
  - College of Applied Science, Vadakkencherry
  - College of Applied Sciences, Adoor, affiliated with Kerala University
- Bhaskraycharya College of Applied Sciences, affiliated with the University of Delhi, India
- Waljat Colleges of Applied Sciences, in partnership with the Birla Institute of Technology (BIT, Mesra), India
- Birla Institute of Applied Sciences, is a sister institute to the Birla Institute of Technology Mesra, Ranchi

== Elsewhere ==
- Colleges of Applied Sciences, Oman, six government-run MoHE colleges in Oman
- University College of Applied Sciences (UCAS), Gaza, Palestine
- University of Cincinnati College of Applied Science, Ohio

== See also ==
- College of Applied Science and Technology (disambiguation)
- University of Applied Sciences
- School of Applied Sciences
