= College of Engineering Karunagappally =

Indian technology institute

Government College of Engineering Karunagappally
- Motto: श्रद्धावान् लभते ज्ञानं (shraddhavaan labhate jnyaanam)(Sanskrit) (Malayalam: ശ്രദ്ധവാൻ ലഭത്തെ ജ്ഞാനം - ശ്രദ്ധാലുവിന് ആത്മജാനം കൈവരുന്നു)
- Motto in English: "Dedicated person achieves knowledge"
- Type: Public
- Established: 1999
- Affiliations: A P J Abdul Kalam Technological University, AICTE, National Board of Accreditation
- Principal: Dr. Prof. Smitha Dharan
- Academic staff: 80
- Administrative staff: 50
- Students: 900
- Undergraduates: 800
- Postgraduates: 100
- Location: Karunagappally, Kerala, India; 9.06443389°N 76.557003476°E
- Campus: Rural (28-acre (110,000 m^{2}))
- Acronym: CEK
- Website: www.ceknpy.ac.in

The Government College of Engineering Karunagappally (KNP) is a public institute of engineering and technology in Karunagappally, in the north-west of Kollam district, Kerala, India. Established in 1999 by the Government of Kerala, it is the second engineering college in Kollam district the fourth engineering college under the aegis of the state government's Institute of Human Resources Development in Electronics. The institute is affiliated to the A P J Abdul Kalam Technological University, Recognized by AICTE and Accredited by National Board of Accreditation(NBA). It is the second engineering College in the Kerala Section to win the prestigious IEEE Region 10(Asia - Pacific) Exemplary Student Branch Award, First and Only student branch in Asia Pacific Region to win the IEEE MGA Regional Exemplary Student Branch Award five times in a row.

The college offers four undergraduate programmes and two postgraduate programmes in the field of engineering and technology. Since 2012 it has been aided by the World Bank under the Government of India's TEQIP Programme.

== History ==
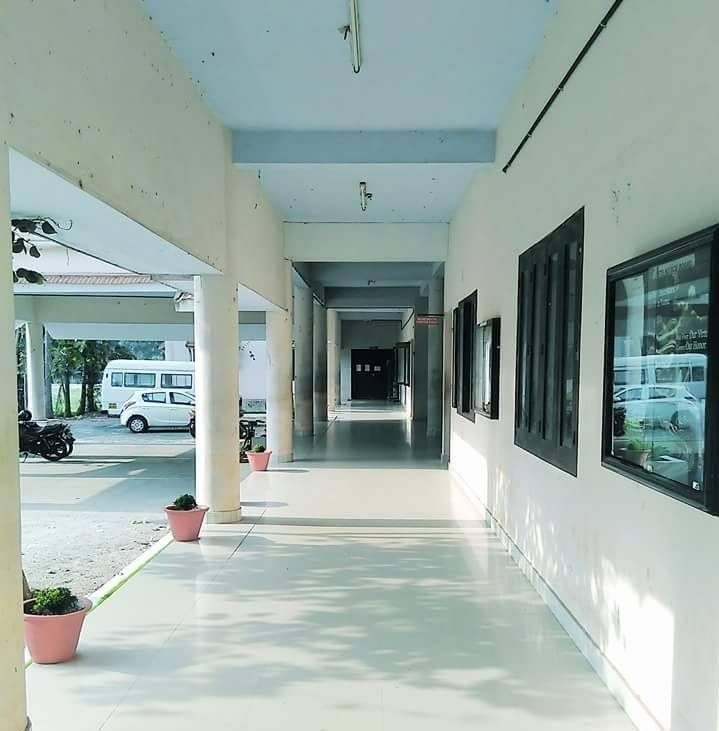
CEK Corridor

On 28 January 1987, the Government of Kerala established the Institute of Human Resources Development in Electronics (IHRDE) (now known as IHRD) in Thiruvananthapuram for the purpose of establishing a central institution which would work for the development of technical education in the state. The governing body of the IHRDE was headed by the then education minister of Kerala, K. Chandrasekharan. The first institute established under the IHRDE was the Model Polytechnic in Vadakara in 1988. In 1989 Government Model Engineering College was the first engineering college established under the IHRDE.

Former Minister of Food, Tourism, Law & Civil Supplies E. Chandrasekharan Nair, who represented Karunagappally in the Kerala Legislative Assembly, put forward a proposal to start an engineering institute in Karunagappally under the auspices of the IHRDE; in 1999 CEK was the fourth engineering institute established under the IHRDE. The college started off with three undergraduate courses in engineering: Information Technology, Computer Engineering and Electronics Engineering. The college received affiliation from AICTE and the Cochin University of Science and Technology in 1999. The college commenced teaching from the 2000 academic year.

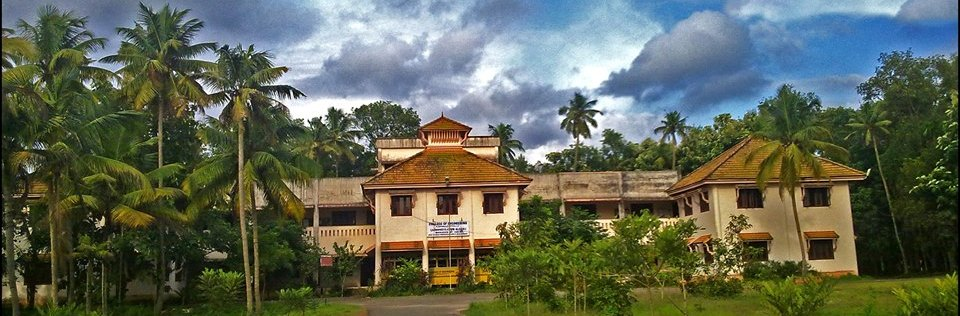
CEK in 2000s

The initial functioning of the college was from temporary premises in three rooms of at a hall in Karunagappally town. Later it is shifted to a government godown in Karunagappally. The college was officially inaugurated by the Chief Minister of Kerala E. K. Nayanar, two years after its establishment, on 4 February 2001. The college moved to a permanent campus in 2006 at Thodiyoor Gramapanchayathu, with the foundation stone of the administrative block laid by Minister of Education Nalakath Soopy on 12 February 2004 in the presence of Rajan Babu MLA.

The college was selected in 2012 to participate in Phase II of the Technical Education Quality Improvement Programme, a project organised by the Government of India with assistance from the World Bank). The college was selected under component 1, sub-component 1.1 of the programme, for "strengthening institutions to improve learning outcomes and employability of graduates".

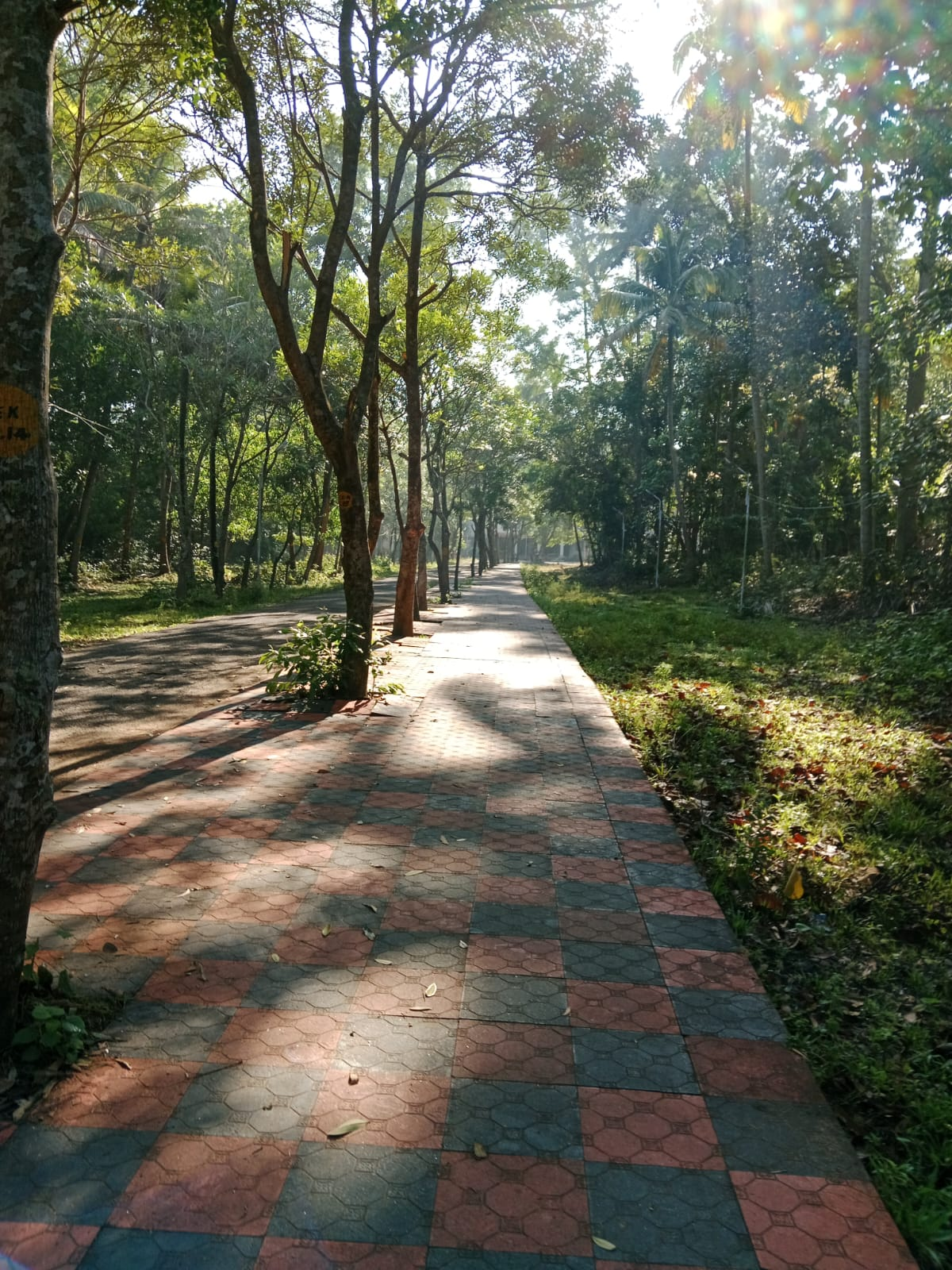

In 2011 a Department of Electrical and Electronics Engineering was established. A postgraduate programme was commenced by the Department of Computer Science and Engineering in the same year. In 2012 a second postgraduate program in electronics and communication engineering commenced being offered. In 2015 the college became affiliated with the A P J Abdul Kalam Technological University. In 2020 a Department of Mechanical Engineering was established with Bachelor course with an approved in take of 60 seats.

Two Bachelor Programs of the College (Computer Science, Electronics and Communication) got accredited in 2018 for 3 Years by NBA.

== Administration ==
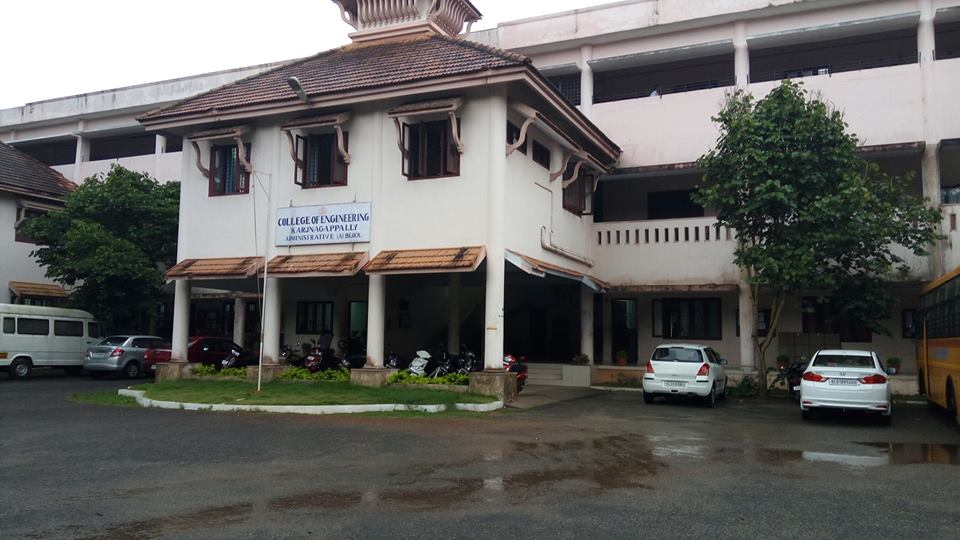
CEK Administration Block

The college functions under Kerala's Institute of Human Resources Development. The Chairman is the state's Education Minister and the Vice-Chairman is the Principal-secretary of the Higher Education Department. The college's principal is appointed by the IHRD Director.

=== Department of Electrical and Electronics Engineering ===
The Department of Electrical and Electronics Engineering was formed in 2011 and has an annual intake of 60 students.
The department has the following laboratories:

- Basic Electrical Engineering Laboratory
- Electrical Machines I Laboratory (DC Machines)
- Electrical Machines II Laboratory (AC Machines)
- Electrical Measurements Laboratory
- Power Electronics Laboratory
- Advanced Electrical Engineering Laboratory.

=== Department of Electronics and Communication Engineering ===
The Department of Electronics and Communication Engineering was formed as the Electronics Engineering Department in 1999 and commenced teaching from the college's first batch of students in 2000. In 2012 the department started a Masters of Technology course with a specialisation in signal processing. In 2020 the department intake was reduced to 30.

The laboratories under the Department of Electronics & Communication Engineering are:

- Electronic Circuits and Digital Laboratory
- Micro processor and Advanced Micro Controller Laboratory
- Digital Laboratory
- Communication and Microwave Laboratory
- Digital Signal Processing
- EC Project Laboratory
- PG and Research Lab
- PG Signal Processing Lab

=== Department of Computer Science and Engineering ===
The Department of Computer Science and Engineering was formed as the Computer Engineering Department in 1999 and commenced teaching from the college's first batch of students in 2000. In 2011 the department started a Masters of Technology course with a specialisation in image processing.
The Computer Science and Engineering is equipped with the following laboratories:

- Programming Laboratory
- Internet Laboratory
- Hardware/Networking Laboratory
- Project Laboratory - 2
- PG and Research Lab
- PG Image processing Lab

=== Department of Mechanical Engineering ===
The Department of Mechanical Engineering was formed in 2020 and has an annual intake of 60 students.
The department has the following laboratories:

- Basic Mechanical Workshop
- Graphics Drawing Hall
- Machine Workshop

=== Department of Information Technology ===
The Department of Information Technology was formed in 1999 and commenced teaching from the college's first batch of students in 2000 with an intake of 45 students. Later the intake was reduced to 30 students. The department closed in the year 2015
The Department of Information Technology laboratories are:

- Systems and Application Laboratory
- Internet Laboratory
- Multimedia Laboratory

=== Department of Applied Science ===
The Department of Applied Science teaches mathematics, physics, chemistry and humanities.

The Department of Applied Science laboratories are:

- Language Lab
- Basic Physics Laboratory
- Basic Chemistry Laboratory

=== Department of General Engineering ===
The Department of General Engineering is engaged in teaching basic engineering subjects and applied science subjects. This department consists of Civil Engineering, Technical Communication etc.
The Department of General Engineering laboratories/Workshop are:

- Basic Civil Workshop

=== Department of Physical Education ===
The Department of Physical Education supports the physical and mental health of students. It maintains a main ground near the Administration Block and a smaller ground near the MLA block.

== Admission ==
=== Undergraduate Programmes ===
The admission for both the Merit Quota and Management Quota is based on the rank secured in the All Kerala Engineering Entrance Examination conducted by the Commissioner for Entrance Examinations, Government of Kerala. The difference between the merit quota and management quota is in the amount of fees that have to be paid by the candidates. 50% of seats are under the Merit Quota and 45% of seats are under the Management Quota. The fees of these seats are fixed by the fees regulatory committee of Government of Kerala. The remaining 5% of seats are reserved for the children of Non-Resident Indians (NRIs). These seats are filled up purely based on the marks obtained in the Qualifying Exam. Annual intake to the Bachelor of Technology course is as follows:

- Computer Science and Engineering: 60 seats (+10% lateral entry students)
- Electronics and Communication Engineering: 30 seats (+10% lateral entry students)
- Electrical and Electronics Engineering: 60 seats (+10% lateral entry students)
- Mechanical Engineering: 60 seats (+10% lateral entry students)

=== Postgraduate Programmes ===
Admission to the college's postgraduate programs is through the Graduate Aptitude Test in Engineering exam administered and conducted jointly by the Indian Institute of Science and the Indian Institutes of Technology. Admission to sponsored seats are as per the Government of Kerala and All India Council for Technical Education rules. Annual intake to the Master of Technology course is as follows:

- Electronics Engineering (with specialisation in signal processing): 24 seats
- Computer Science Engineering (with specialisation in image processing): 24 seats

== Campus ==
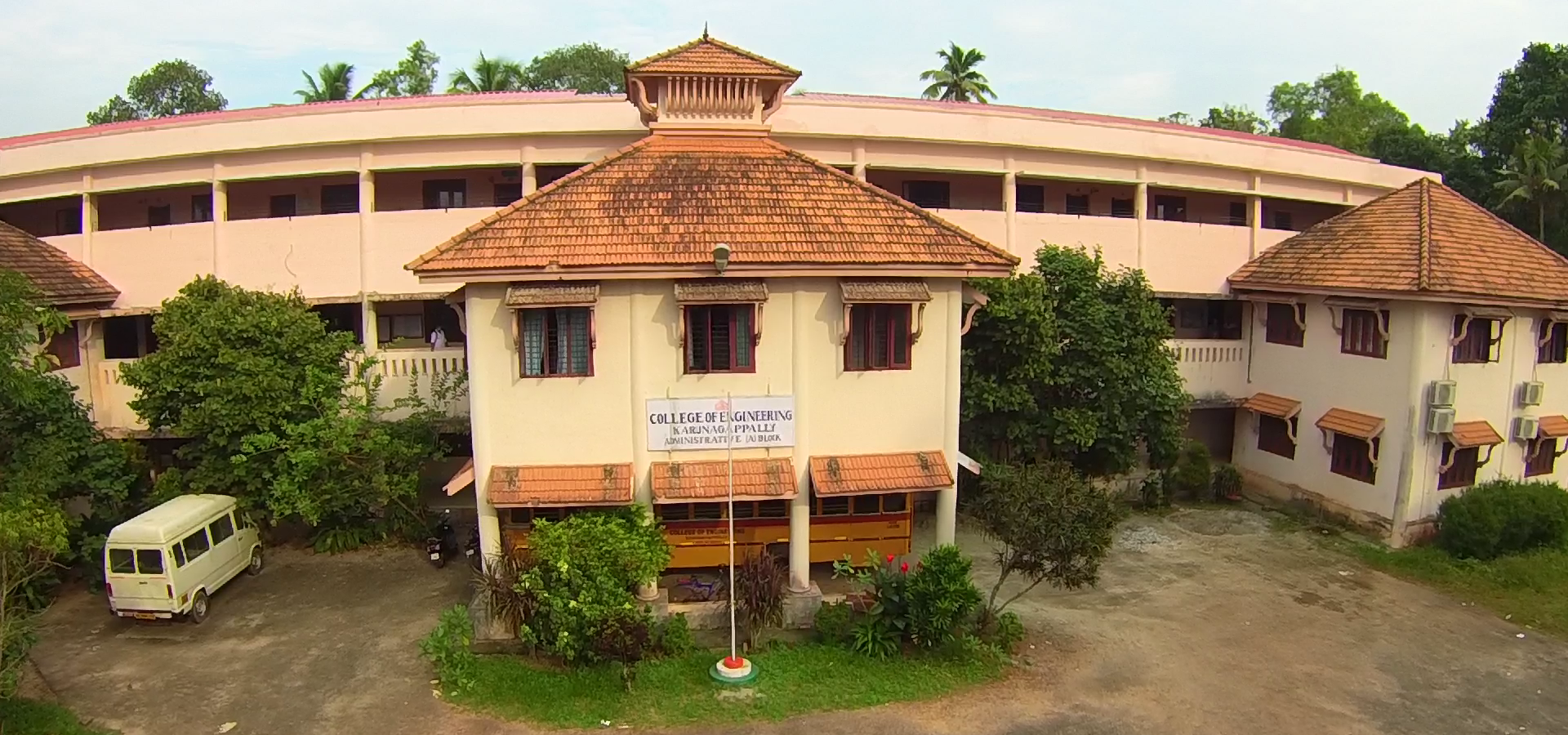
New face of CEK 2015

The college's campus is located 3 km from Karunagappally, in the northwest of Kollam district, near Veluthamanal and Driver Junction. The Government renamed the Veluthamanal - Driver Junction road as "Engineering College Road" following the college's relocation to the site. The 28-acre campus is the largest of those institutions under the IHRD. The design of the administration building was inspired from Hindu temple architecture. Initially, it had two floors with eight classrooms, one seminar hall, one computer lab and office. A third floor was later added for first-year students' classrooms. The campus consists of an Administration Block, MLA Block, MP Block and NABARD Block, with a separate laboratory for physics and chemistry, and a mechanical workshop with drawing hall.

== Technical Paper Conference ==
IEEE Industrial Application Society approved India's first IEEE Student lead technical paper conference in College of Engineering Karunagappally named 2020 IEEE International Power and Renewable Energy Conference (IPRECON 2020). Technically & financially sponsored by IEEE Industrial Application Society.

== Awards and Global Achievements ==
1. IEEE MGA Regional Exemplary Student Branch Award 2018 (Declared at Asia Pacific Student Young Professional Women in Engineering and Life Members Congress at Bali Indonesia)

2.IEEE MGA Regional Exemplary Student Branch Award 2019

3.IEEE MGA Darrel Chong Student Activities Award - Gold 2019 (For organizing innovative technical event Luxathon 1.O)

4.IEEE MGA Global Outstanding Counselor Award 2019 - Prof. Sabeena K (For Outstanding contribution towards IEEE technical activities)

5.IEEE Industrial Application Society Global website Contest first prize 2019 - Webmaster : Mr. Akshay Krishnan

6. IEEE Industrial Application Society Outstanding Member Award 2020(Global) - Chapter Advisor : Prof. Sabeena K

== CEK Student Senate ==
The Students Executive Senate, simply known as the CEK Senate, is the supreme student body. The members of the senate are elected by and from the students, with one representatives from each and one girl representative from each year. The objectives of the senate are to train the students of the college in their duties, responsibilities and rights, to organize debates, seminars, group discussions, work squads, and tours, and to encourage sports, arts and other cultural, social or recreational activities. The first Senate formed in 2000 with six members.

== Department Associations ==
=== ELEKTOR ===
ELEKTOR is the association of Electrical & Electronics Engineering of College of Engineering Karunagapally. The main motive of this association is to empower the talents and ideas in electrical engineering. This is providing a platform for students to share their ideas and to interact with others. It was being inaugurated by Dr Jayaraju Director ANERT on 31-07-2013.

=== CECIA ===
It is the association of computer Science Engineering and Information technology

=== ASECTRON ===
It is the association of electronics and communication Engineering department

== Student organizations ==
=== IEEE Student Branch ===
IEEE Student Branch College of Engineering Karunagappally (STB 03951) is one of the oldest IEEE student branches in Kerala section, 4th branch in Travancore hub after CET TKMCE & CE Adoor. And It is the second IEEE Student Branch in Kollam (Quilon) district. The group came into function on 11 September 2000, in the early history of the institution. It is officially formed as an organization unit on 13 May 2009. Student members of CEK take active participation in the IEEE meetings and workshops, earning many prizes and awards. In 2010 the group started a WIE (Women in Engineering) affinity group. Today IEEE SB CEK have five technical society student branch chapters and one affinity group.

==== IEEE Women in Engineering CEK ====
IEEE Women in Engineering affinity group of CEK working under IEEE SB CEK. Started in 2010. It is one of the oldest WIE AG of Travancore hub (former Hub No 1). It works to bring more women into the engineering field and develop their abilities in technology. The AG started with the help of former active IEEE member Seena Susan George.

==== IEEE Computer Society CEK ====
IEEE Computer Society Student Chapter of CEK working under IEEE SB CEK. IEEE CS CEK Started in 2015 with 20 student members as a request from Computer Science students to learn more about computer and designated Field.

==== IEEE Power & Energy Society CEK ====
IEEE Power & Energy Society CEK started in 2016. As the request from electrical engineering students. The official inauguration done by the IEEE PES Chair of Kerala Section.

==== IEEE Industrial Application Society CEK ====
IEEE Industrial Application Society CEK 2017. As the request from electrical engineering students.

==== IEEE Robotics and Automation Society CEK ====
IEEE Robotics and Automation Society CEK 2018. As the request from EC & CS students.

==== IEEE Nuclear Plasma Science Society/Power Electronics Society Joint Chapter CEK ====
IEEE Nuclear Plasma Science Society/Power Electronics Society Joint Chapter CEK 2019. First Joint Student Branch Chapter in IEEE Kerala Section.

=== ISTE Student Chapter CEK ===
In 2009 the college established an Indian Society for Technical Education chapter.

=== CEK NSS Unit ===
The National Service Scheme (NSS) is an Indian government-sponsored public service program conducted by the Department of Youth Affairs and Sports of the Government of India. Popularly known as NSS, the scheme was launched in Gandhiji's Centenary year, 1969. Aimed at developing student's personality through community service, NSS is a voluntary association of young people in Colleges, Universities and at +2 level working for a campus-community linkage.
The CEK started its NSS Unit in 2000 which is a Government funded unit under CUSAT with unit number KL 02 004. Later in 2015 a self-financing unit started under NSS Technical Cell . Today CEK has two active NSS Units

=== CEK IEDC ===
Kerala Startup Mission have been actively initiating various programmes for developing the student entrepreneurship in the state. Government of Kerala declared the start up policy with an aim to accelerate the growth of student entrepreneurs. KSUM being the nodal agency for implementing the Startup policy have come up with various schemes for the effective implementation of the policy. The schemes cover a broad area from schools, colleges and to young entrepreneurs. With the help of startup Mission CEK Started IEDC in 2016

== Alumni ==
Alumni interaction is maintained through the Alumni Network under the aegis of the Staffs of Alumni Affairs and International Relations, office staff and student representatives. It also helps in conducting the annual alumni meets. The students of CEK are known as CEKians, and the alumni are known as XCEKians.
