= IHRD =

IHRD may refer to:

- Institute of Human Resources Development, Kerala, India
- International Holocaust Remembrance Day
