= Education in Pathanamthitta district =

Most of the schools and colleges in Pathanamthitta district are in Pandalam, Konni, Kozhncheri, Thiruvalla, Ranni, Adoor and Pathanamthitta

NSS College, Pandalam established in 1950 is the oldest institution of higher learning in the district.

Catholicate College Pathanamthitta was established in 1951 by Malankara Orthodox Syrian Church. The college contributed much to the social and cultural fabric of Pathanamthitta. The college was an upgradation of Catholicate High School which was founded before that.

== Schools ==
- SVGV Higher Secondary School, Kidangannoor
- NSS Higher Secondary School, Pandalam
- Government Higher Secondary School, Thottakkoonam, Pandalam
- St. Thomas English Medium High School, Kurampala, Pandalam
- Mar Dionysius Senior Secondary School, Mallappally
- Eminence Public School, Pandalam
- NSS Higher Secondary School, Thattayil, Pandalam
- Amrita Vidyalayam, Pandalam
- Seventh Day Adventist Higher Secondary School, Azhoor, Pathanamthitta, (ICSE, ISC)
- NSK International School, Thumpamon, Pandalam, (IGCSE - Cambridge Curriculum)
- P.S.V.P.M.H.S.S, Iravon
- M.K.Letha Memorial Public School, Iravon (ICSE Institute)
- Mount Bethany Public School, Kumbazha
- Nss Hss Kunnamthanam, Mallappally
- G.V.H.S.S & H.S.S Kalanjoor
- CMS Higher Secondary School Mallappally
- Sacred Heart High School
- Holy Angels School Adoor
- Government High School Adoor
- Kendriya Vidyalaya Adoor
- St Mary's High School Adoor
- Thapovan School Adoor
- M.G.M Higher Secondary School, Thiruvalla
- Catholicate Higher Secondary School
- Kiddies crown preschool & day care (play school)
- St Mary's Central School, Pathanamthitta
- Jawahar Navodaya Vidyalaya, Vechoochira, Pathanamthitta
- Kendriya Vidyalaya, Pathanamthitta
- Holy Angels Model School, Pathanamthitta
- Amritha Vidialayam Kallarakadavu Pathanamthitta
- Holy Angles Model SchoolMundukottakal Po Pathanamthitta Kerala
- SDA School, Pathanamthitta
- AMM Higher Secondary School, Edayaranmula
- Arya Bharathi High School, Omalloor, Pathanamthitta
- Madonna International Residenal School, Pathanamthitta
- S.N.D.P Higher Secondary School, Chenneerkkara, Pathanamthitta
- Athurasramam central school, kodunthara, Pathanamthitta
- M.T.L.P. School Vengal, Thiruvalla, Pathanamthitta
- Syrian Christian Higher Secondary School, Ranny
- M.S. Higher Secondary School, Ranny
- ST. Mary's Higher Secondary School, Ranny
- Citadel Higher Secondary School, Ranny
- St. Mary's Residential Public School, Thiruvalla
- Jawahar Navodaya Vidyalaya, Mannadisala, Vechoochira

S.C.S Higher Secondary School Tiruvalla

== Arts & Science colleges ==
- Bishop Abraham Memorial College, Thurithicadu
- Catholicate College, Pathanamthitta
- College of Applied Science, Pathanamthitta
- College of Applied Sciences (I.H.R.D.), Adoor
- College of Applied Sciences (I.H.R.D.), Kalanjoor
- Devaswom Board College, Parumala
- Govt Arts & science College, Elanthoor, Pathanamthitta
- Mannam Memorial N S S College, Konni
- Mar Athanasios College for Advanced Studies (MACFAST), Tiruvalla
- Mar Thoma Academy (near TMM Hospital), Tiruvalla
- Mar Thoma College, Kuttapuzha, Tiruvalla
- Musaliar College of Arts and Science, Pathanamthitta
- MMNSS College Konni
- N. S. S. College, Pandalam
- Pamba DB College, Parumala, Tiruvalla
- Parumala mar Gregorious College Valanjavalttom, Tiruvalla
- Prince Marthandavarma College, Peringara, Tiruvalla
- SAS SNDP Yogam College, Konni
- SN College, Othera
- St. Cyril's College, Adoor
- St. Thomas College, Kozhencherry
- St. Thomas College, Thuruthicaud
- St. Thomas College, Ranni
- St Thomas College, Thavalappara, Konni
- Viswa Brahmana College, Vechoochira
- VNS College Of Arts and Science, Konni
- IATS (International Air Travel Studies) Adoor

== Engineering Colleges ==
- Caarmel Engineering College, Perunad
- College of Engineering, Kallooppara
- College of Engineering, Adoor
- K.V.V.S. Institute of Technology, Kaithapparamb, Adoor.
- Mount Zion College of Engineering
- Musaliar College of Engineering and Technology, Kumbazha
- Sree Buddha College of Engineering, Elavumthitta
- Sree Narayana Institute of Technology [SNIT], Adoor, Pathanamthitta

== Computer Application Colleges ==
- Musaliar College of Arts and Science, Pathanamthitta

== Industrial Training ==
- Govt. Polytechnic (Nodal Polytechnic), Vennikulam
- Govt. Polytechnic, Adoor
- Govt. Polytechnic, Vechoochira
- Govt. Polytechnic, Vennikulam
- N.S.S. Polytechnic (Private), Pandalam
- Mar Philexenos ITI, Mylapra

== Law ==
- Law College, Central University of Kerala, Thiruvalla

== Management ==
- K.V.V.S. Institute of Technology, Adoor
- Mar Athanasios College for Advanced Studies, Tiruvalla
- Mar Athanasius College of Advanced Studies, Pathanamthitta
- Mulamoottil International Business School (MIBS), Tiruvalla
- Musaliar College of Arts and Science, Pathanamthitta
- SS Academy of Management and Science (SSMS), Thiruvalla
- St. John's College Thorrupram, Pathanamthitta

== Medical Colleges ==
- Government Medical College, Konni
- Believers Church Medical College, Kuttappuzha, Thiruvalla
- Pushpagiri Institute of Medical Sciences and Research Centre, Thiruvalla
- Mount Zion Medical College Enadimangalam, Adoor
- Mannam Ayurveda Co-operative Medical College, Pandalam

== Commerce College ==
- Musaliar College of Arts and Science, Pathanamthitta

== Nursing ==
- College of Nursing, Pathanamthitta
- Archana College of Nursing, Pandalam
- NSS Nursing College, Pandalam
- M.G.M. Muthoot College of Nursing, Kallarakadavu, Pathanamthitta
- Pushpagiri College of Nursing, Pathanamthitta
- T.M.M. College of Nursing, Tiruvalla

== Pharmacy ==
- Nazareth College of Pharmacy, Othera, Tiruvalla
- Pushpagiri college of pharmacy

== Teacher Education ==
- H.H. Marthoma Mathews II Training College, Pathanamthitta
- Kerala University College of Teacher Education, Pathanamthitta
- Mahatma Gandhi University College of Teacher Education, Pathanamthitta
- Mar Severios Memorial Training College, Thiruvalla
- Marthoma Nursery Teacher Training Institute, Tiruvalla
- Marthoma Training College, Edakulam
- NSS Training College, Pandalam
- S.V.G.V. Training College, Aranmula
- Sankaramangalam Training College, Thiruvalla
- St. Mary Women's College of Teacher Education, Thiruvalla
- Titus II Teachers College, Thiruvalla

== Universities ==
- MG university off campus, Kaviyoor, Thiruvalla

An engineering college, which is government-controlled and self-financing, managed by Cochin University, is at Kallooppara: the College of Engineering Kallooppara.

There are two private-sector medical colleges in Tiruvalla: the Pushpagiri medical college and the Believers Church medical college. These are the only medical colleges in the district. There is also a dental college, the Pushpagiri Dental College, in Tiruvalla.
