= The Illuminati Quiz =

Indian Quiz Contest

The Illuminati Quiz is an annual Indian quiz contest that began on 8 December 2008; the students of the Model Engineering College (MEC) organized this south India level quiz competition as a tribute and a memorial to Sandeep Menon (1984-2008). In 2004 "The Illuminatus", or Menon, as he was commonly called, started the community called "The Illuminati", whose aim is to promote and continue the quizzing tradition both within college and with the extended community. It has conducted over 120 intra- and inter- collegiate quizzes to date. In addition, three annual versions of The Illuminati Quiz have been conducted at a South India level. The quiz consists of an online quizzing competition and a preliminary written round in which six qualifying teams make it to the final round.

In the third Illuminati quiz on 7 August 2010, the Quiz Master was Sadashiv N., and the winners were Amit R, RNSIT Bangalore, and Vineeth Raj, RVCE Bangalore, in first place; Pramod, NIT Trichy and Harish, SVCE Chennai, in second; and Varun Rajiv and Raghuram Cadambi, NLS Bangalore, in third. The Online Quizzer was Karthik Sivaram. Six teams qualified for the final leg of the event. The questions included, "name the connection between Ruy Lopez de Segura, a 16th century Spanish priest, Giuoco Piano, 17th century Italian monk, and Moheschunder Bannerjee from Bengal".

In its second edition, held on 8 August 2009, Nagadarsan Suresh was the quiz master. Nakul P Sangolli, RVCE, Bangalore, won the online quiz and the winners for the main event were Nakul P. Sangoli and Chaitanya G. Hegde RVCE, first place, Rohit S. and Balaji B, CEG & SRM, second, and Rahul Gupta and Sudarshan M. A. RVCE, third.

The very first TIQ, held on 8 December 2008, had Thejaswi Udupa from the Karnataka Quiz Association as the quiz master. Geo Thomas was the online quizzer in the first format of the game.

Sandeep Menon, former student of the Model Engineering College (MEC) at Thrikkakara, died from a brain tumour on 3 May 2008. In his memory, Menon's parents started a foundation called the Sandeep Menon Foundation that helps cancer patients and students who are not able to finance their studies.

Its founder's saying that the spirit of quizzing should drive the Illuminati forward to never miss an event has become their unofficial motto, manifesting itself as the weekly TGIF (Thank God It’s Friday) after school quizzes. It conducts internal quizzes and trains newcomers.
