= College of Applied Science and Technology =

College of Applied Science and Technology may refer to:

- Saskatchewan Institute of Applied Science and Technology (SIAST), Canada
- The College of Applied Science and Technology of the Rochester Institute of Technology
- University of Arizona, College of Applied Science & Technology, U.S.

== See also ==
- College of Applied Science (disambiguation)
