= College of Applied Sciences, Adoor =

Educational institute in Kerala

The College of Applied Sciences, Adoor is an institution under the Institute of Human Resources and Development. It was established in 1994. The college is affiliated to the University of Kerala.

The college offers five undergraduate courses and two postgraduate courses and the introduction of Mcom is expected during the 2014–15 academic year. Along with the mainstream courses the college conducts an Institute of Human Resources and Development course. The project centre provides an opportunity to pursue project works and research attempts.

== Courses ==
It offers courses in electronics and computer science. The number of students intake per year in the respective courses is given in brackets.

- Bsc Electronics (50)
- BCom Computer Application (60)
- Bsc Computer Science (50)
- BBA (40)
- BCA (40)
- BA English (40)
- Msc Computer Science (20)
- Msc Electronics (20)
- PGDCA (40)
- DDT and PM (40)
- CHM & Networking

== Organizations and clubs ==
The following clubs and organizations are available:

- Film club
- Science and Environment Association (SEA)
- Sports Club
- Arts Club
- National Service Scheme (NSS) unit
- Ham Radio Club
- The Ham radio club under Science and Environment Association (SEA) has the credit of organizing interstate HAM Expo-‘98 and exhibition. A placement cell is also functioning in the campus.

== See also ==
- Kerala University
- Institute of Human Resources Development
- Adoor
