= Institute of Human Resources Development =

- Official Logo

Location
- Kerala; India; 8.491840°N 76.923714°E

Information
- Established: 1987

The Institute of Human Resources Development (IHRD) is an autonomous technical educational research institute established by the Government of Kerala in 1987, with its headquarters at Thiruvananthapuram in India.

IHRD has grown within a short period into a network of more than 50 institutions. In addition to regular courses of study in academic establishments, IHRD also runs short and long-term employment-oriented and continuous education programmes.

The initial name of IHRD was Institute of Human Resources Development for Electronics (IHRDE). Later it was renamed to the current version.

IHRD manages several applied science colleges, engineering colleges, polytechnics, and technical schools.

== Partnerships ==
In 2023, IHRD and Kerala Startup Mission (KSUM) teamed up to support technology and entrepreneurial activities in colleges. The MoU was signed with the presence of Higher Education Minister R. Bindu. KSUM announced plans to establish research and development (R&D) centers for startups in IHRD institutions for a period of five years. IHRD also launched a collaborative learning program in partnership with the University of Cincinnati. Under this program, lectures from prominent academics, particularly those of Kerala origin, from the University of Cincinnati and other international institutions would be organized for students and faculty of IHRD's engineering colleges.

== Technical institutes managed by IHRD ==
=== Engineering colleges ===
The following nine engineering colleges are managed by IHRD. They were affiliated with the Cochin University of Science and Technology until 2014; each of them has been affiliated to A P J Abdul Kalam Technological University since 2015.

IHRD coordinates 10 Engineering Colleges.

- Government Model Engineering College
- College of Engineering Chengannur
- College of Engineering, Adoor
- College of Engineering Karunagappally
- College of Engineering, Poonjar
- College of Engineering, Kallooppara
- College of Engineering Attingal
- College of Engineering, Cherthala
- College of Engineering, Kottarakkara
- College of Engineering, Munnar

=== Model Polytechnics Colleges ===
IHRD coordinates 7 Model Polytechnics Colleges.

- Model Residential Polytechnic College, Kuzhalmannam, Palakkad
- Model Polytechnic College, Mattakkara, Kottayam
- Model Polytechnic College, Vatakara, Kozhikode
- Model polytechnic college Poonjar, Kottayam
- Model Polytechnic College, Karunagappally
- Model Polytechnic College, Painavu, Idukki
- E K Nayanar Memorial Model Polytechnic College, Kallyassery
- K.Karunakaran Memorial Model Polytechnic College, Mala

=== Applied Science Colleges ===
IHRD coordinates 42 Applied Science Colleges.

==== Colleges affiliated to University of Kerala ====
- College of Applied Science, Dhanuvachapuram, Trivandrum
- College of Applied Sciences, Adoor
- College of Applied Sciences, Mavelikkara
- College of Applied Sciences, Kundera
- college of Applied sciences, karthikappally

==== Colleges affiliated to Mahatma Gandhi University ====
- College of Applied Sciences, Puthuppally, Kottayam
- College of Applied Sciences, Thodupuzha
- College of Applied Sciences, Peermade
- College of Applied Science, Konni
- College of Applied Sciences, Mallappally
- College Of Applied Science, Kaduthuruthy
- College of Applied science, Petta Kanjirappally
- College of Applied science, Puthanvelikkara
- College of Applied science, Kattapana
- College of Applied science, Nedumkandam

==== Colleges affiliated to University of Calicut ====
- College of Applied Science Calicut
- College of Applied Science, Vattamkulam, Edappal
- College of Applied Science, Nattika
- College of Applied Science Malappuram
- College of Applied Science, Nadapuram
- College of Applied Sciences, Thiruvambady
- College of Applied Science Thamarassery
- College of Applied Science, Vadakkencherry
- College of Applied science, Chelakkara
- College of Applied science, Ayalur
- College of Applied Science, Muthuallur, Malappuram

==== Colleges affiliated to Kannur University ====
- College of Applied Sciences, Koothuparamba
- College of Applied Sciences, Pattuvam
- EMS Memorial College of Applied Science
- AKG Memorial College of Applied Science, Pinarayi, Thalassery
- College of Applied Science, Neruvampram, Pazhayangati
- College of Applied Science, Cheemeni

=== Technical Higher Secondary Schools ===
IHRD coordinates 15 Technical Higher Secondary Schools

- Model Technical Higher Secondary School, Kaloor
- Model Technical Higher Secondary School, Kaprassery
- Technical Higher Secondary School, Adoor
- Technical Higher Secondary School, Aluva
- Technical Higher Secondary School, Cherthala
- Technical Higher Secondary School, Mallappally
- Technical Higher Secondary School, Muttada, Trivandrum
- Technical Higher Secondary School, Perinthalmanna
- Technical Higher Secondary School, Perumade
- Technical Higher Secondary School, Puthuppally
- Technical Higher Secondary School, Thiruthiyad
- Technical Higher Secondary School, Thodupuzha, Muttom
- Technical Higher Secondary School, Varadium
- Technical Higher Secondary School, Vattamkulam
- Technical Higher Secondary School, Vazhakkad
