= Puliyavu =

Village in Kerala, India

Puliyavu is a village in Kozhikode (Calicut) district in the Indian state of Kerala. Puliyavu belongs to Chekkiad village office.

== Education ==
The village has a National College of Art and Science, established in 2005 and managed by the All India Islamic Educational Trust (AIIET). The college is affiliated with the University of Calicut. The town also has a primary school aided by the government.

== Transportation ==
Puliyavu village connects to other parts of India through Vatakara city on the west and Kuttiady town on the east. National highway No.66 (NH 66) passes through Vatakara and the northern stretch connects to Mangalore, Goa and Mumbai. The southern stretch connects to Cochin and Trivandrum. The eastern Highway going through Kuttiady connects to Mananthavady, Mysore and Bangalore. The nearest airports are at Kannur and Kozhikode. The nearest railway station is at Vatakara.
