= List of educational institutions in Kozhikode district =

This is a list of educational institutions in Kozhikode District.

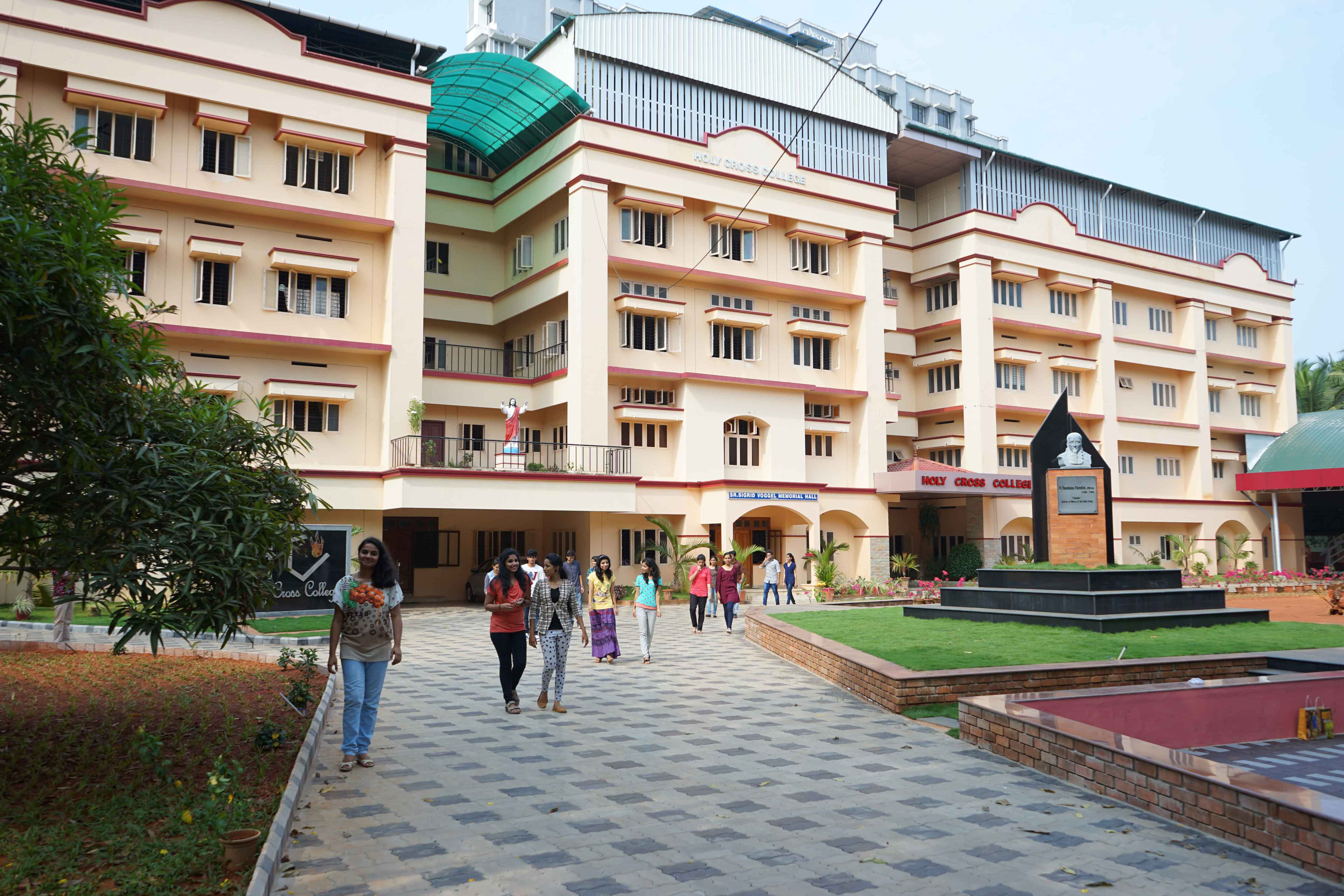
Holy Cross Institute of management and Technology

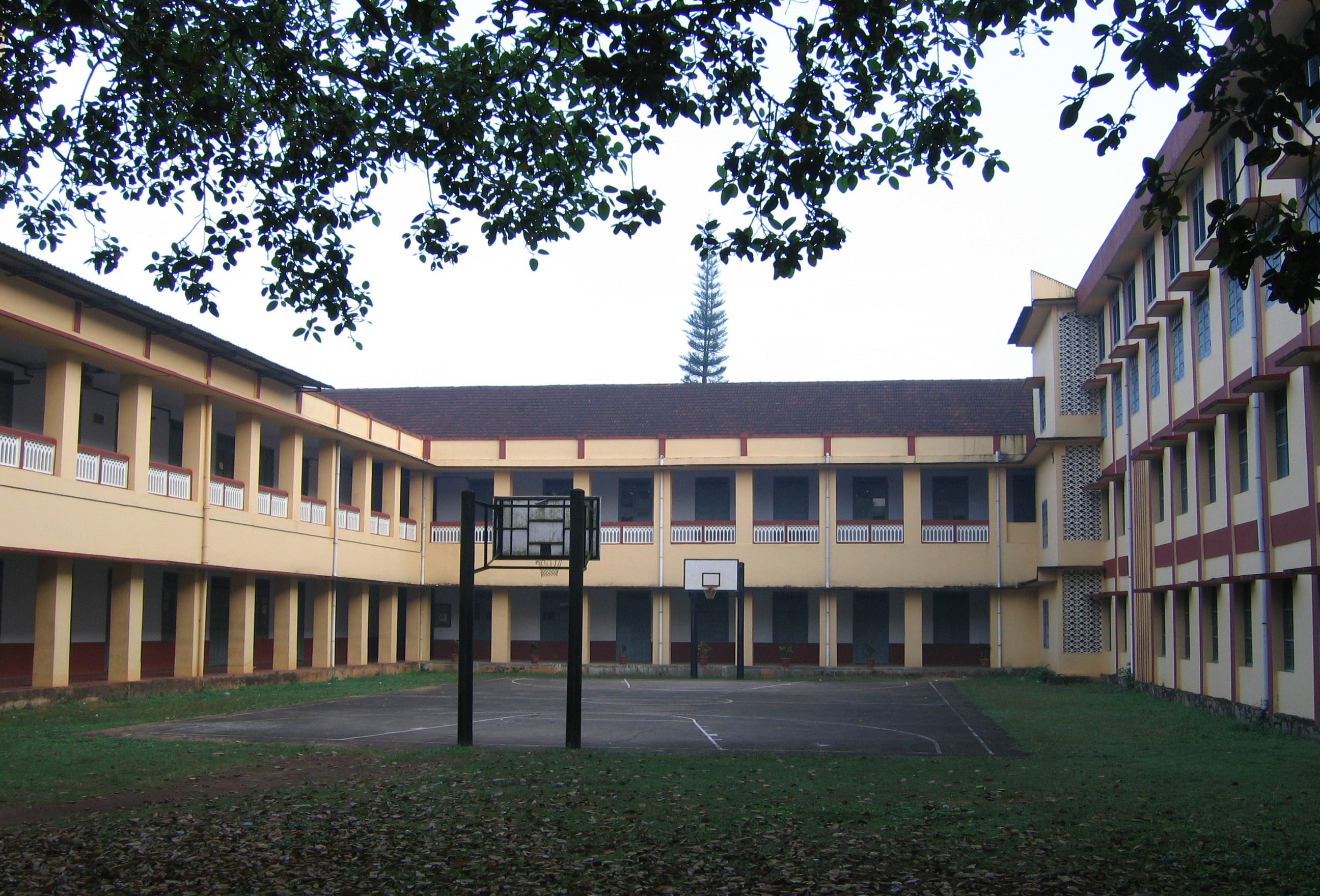
Devagiri College

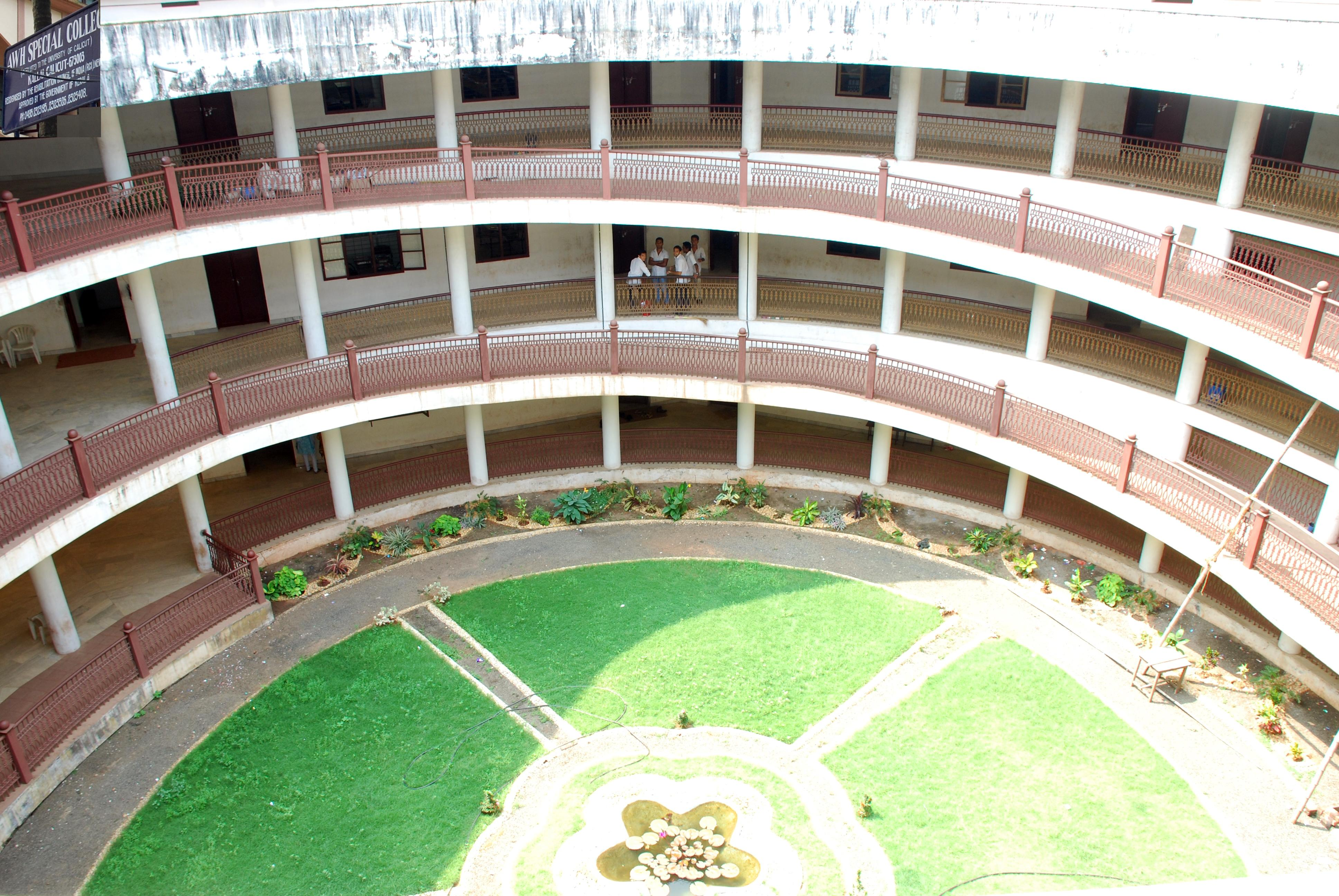
AWH Medical College

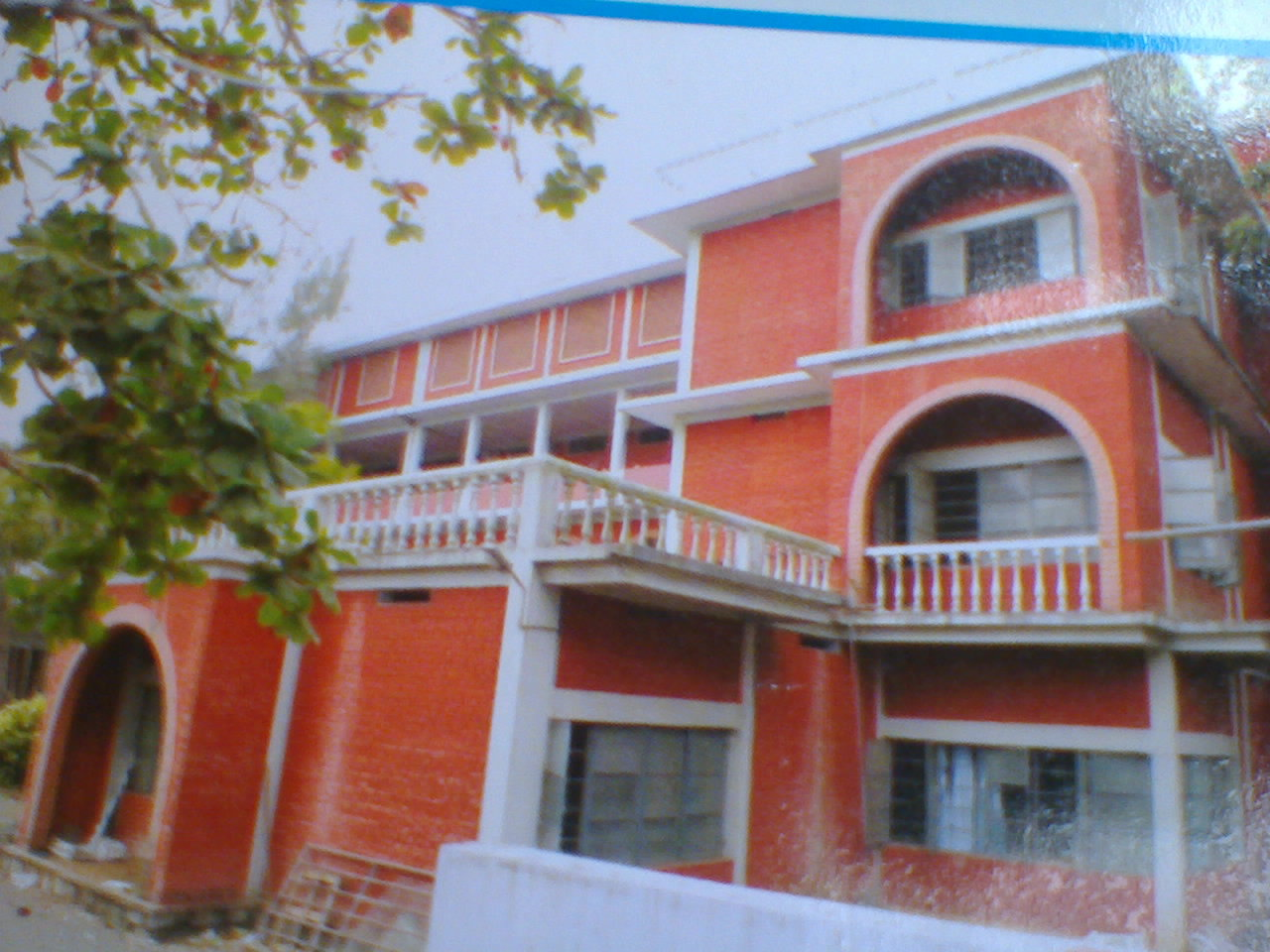
Alfarook College, Feroke

== Major campuses ==
- Indian Institute of Management Kozhikode (IIM Kozhikode)
- Govt Medical College Calicut
- National Institute of Technology Calicut (NIT Calicut)

=== Arts and science colleges ===
- College of Applied Science Kozhikode (IHRD)
- Farook College
- Markaz Arts and Science College
- Malabar Christian College
- Holy cross Institute of Management and Technology
- St. Joseph's College, Devagiri
- Zamorin's Guruvayurappan College
- R. Shankar Memorial Arts and Science College
- AWH Special College, Kozhikode
- SNG College Chelannur
- Government College, Madappally
- Providence Women's College
- College of Applied Science, Thamarassery
- Govt. College, Kodanchery
- Govt. College, Kunnamangalam
- Govt. College, Koduvally
- Govt. College, Balussery
- M Dasan Arts & Science College Ulliyeri
- KMO Arts & Science College, Koduvally
- MES Arts & Science College, Chathamangalam
- National College of Arts & Science, Puliyavu
- Dayapuram Arts and Science College for Women
- MAMO College Manassery
- Don Bosco College Mampetta
- Sree Gokulam Arts And Science College
- College of Applied Science Thiruvambady, Mukkam
- College of Applied Science Thiruvambady
- College of Applied Science Nadhapuram
- St Saviors College Eranhipalam

=== Engineering colleges ===
- National Institute of Technology Calicut
- Government Engineering College, Kozhikode
- AWH Engineering College
- KMCT College of Engineering
- M Dasan Institute of Technology, Ulliyeri

=== Architectural colleges ===
- Avani Institute of Design, Thamarassery

=== Law colleges ===
- Government Law College, Kozhikode
- Markaz Law College

=== Medical colleges ===
- Govt Medical College Kozhikode
- Government Homoeopathic Medical College Kozhikode
- KMCT Medical College Manassery
- Malabal Medical College Modakkalloor

=== Management institutes ===
- Indian Institute of Management Kozhikode
- Sirajul Huda Institute of Management Studies, Kuttiadi
- Farook Institute of Management Studies
- Malabar Academy For Management Studies
- Camford Institute Of Management
- IIKM Business School (West Hill)
- School of Management Studies, Kozhikode
- SNES Institute of Management Studies And Research (IMSAR)
- Edu Mould College of Management Studies
- Saga Institute of Management Studies
- Tourfed Academy For Management Studies
- SNES College of Arts Commerce & Management, Calicut

=== Other organizations ===
- Altus Institute of Higher Education
- Image Creative Education
- Cindrebay School of Design
- Footwear Design and Development Institute
- Indian Institute of Spices Research
- Kerala School of Mathematics, Kozhikode
- National College of Pharmacy, Manassery
- National Institute of Communicable Diseases
- National Institute of Electronics and Information Technology
- NIRDESH Shipbuilding Institute
- Usha School of Athletics
- Zoological Survey of India

== Image gallery ==
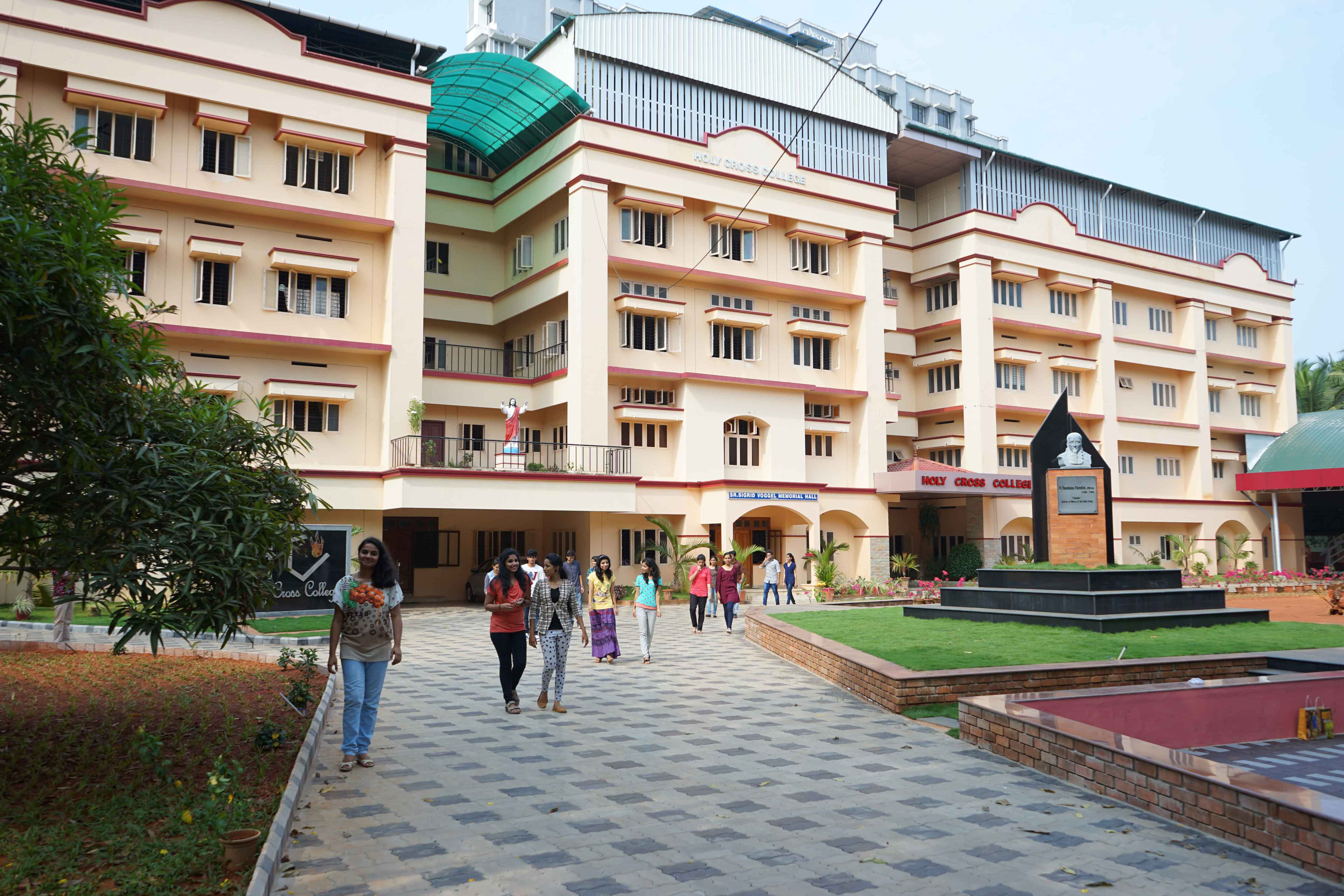
Holy cross Institute of Management and Technology

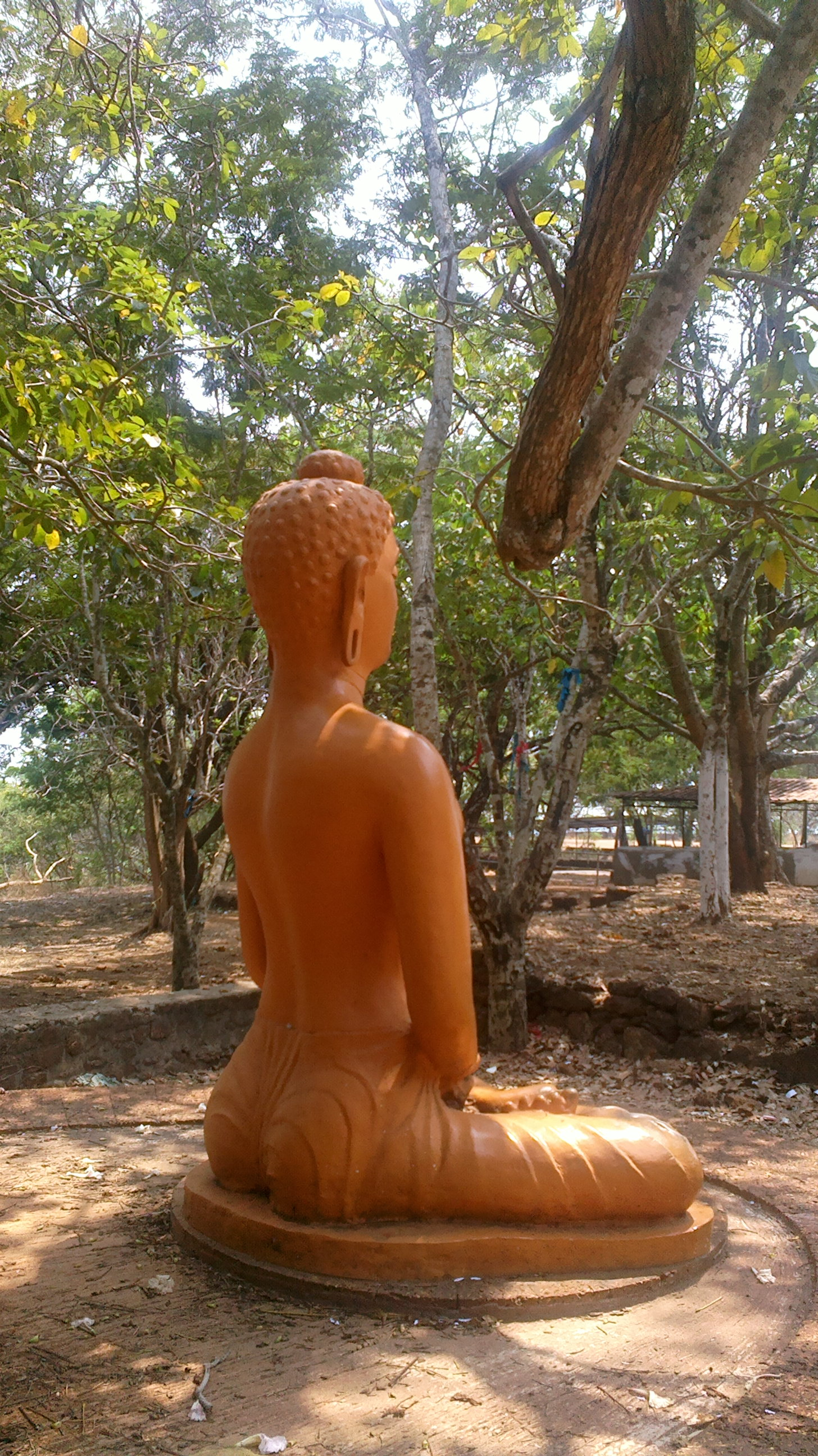
Guruvayoorappan College

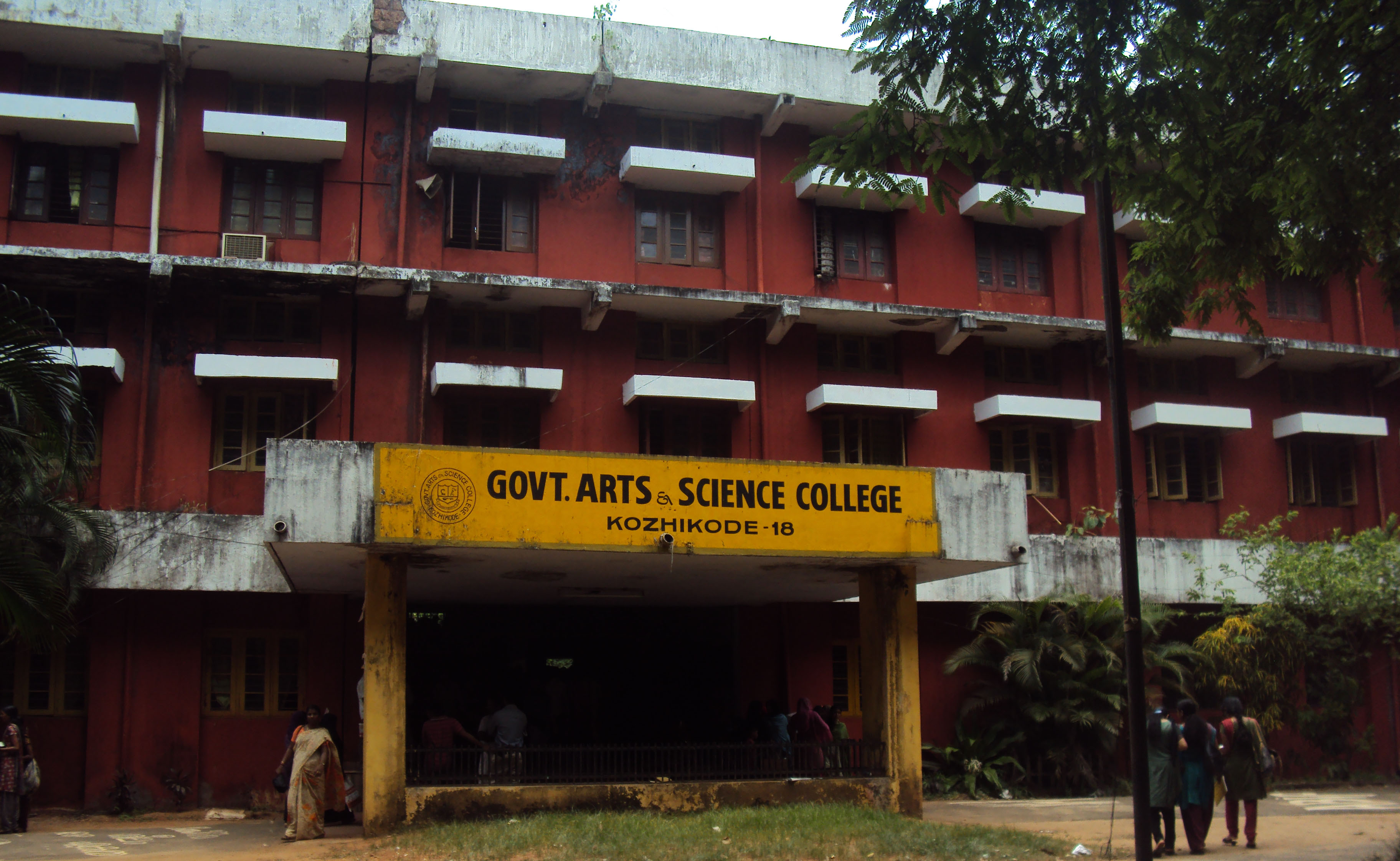
Government College, Meenchantha

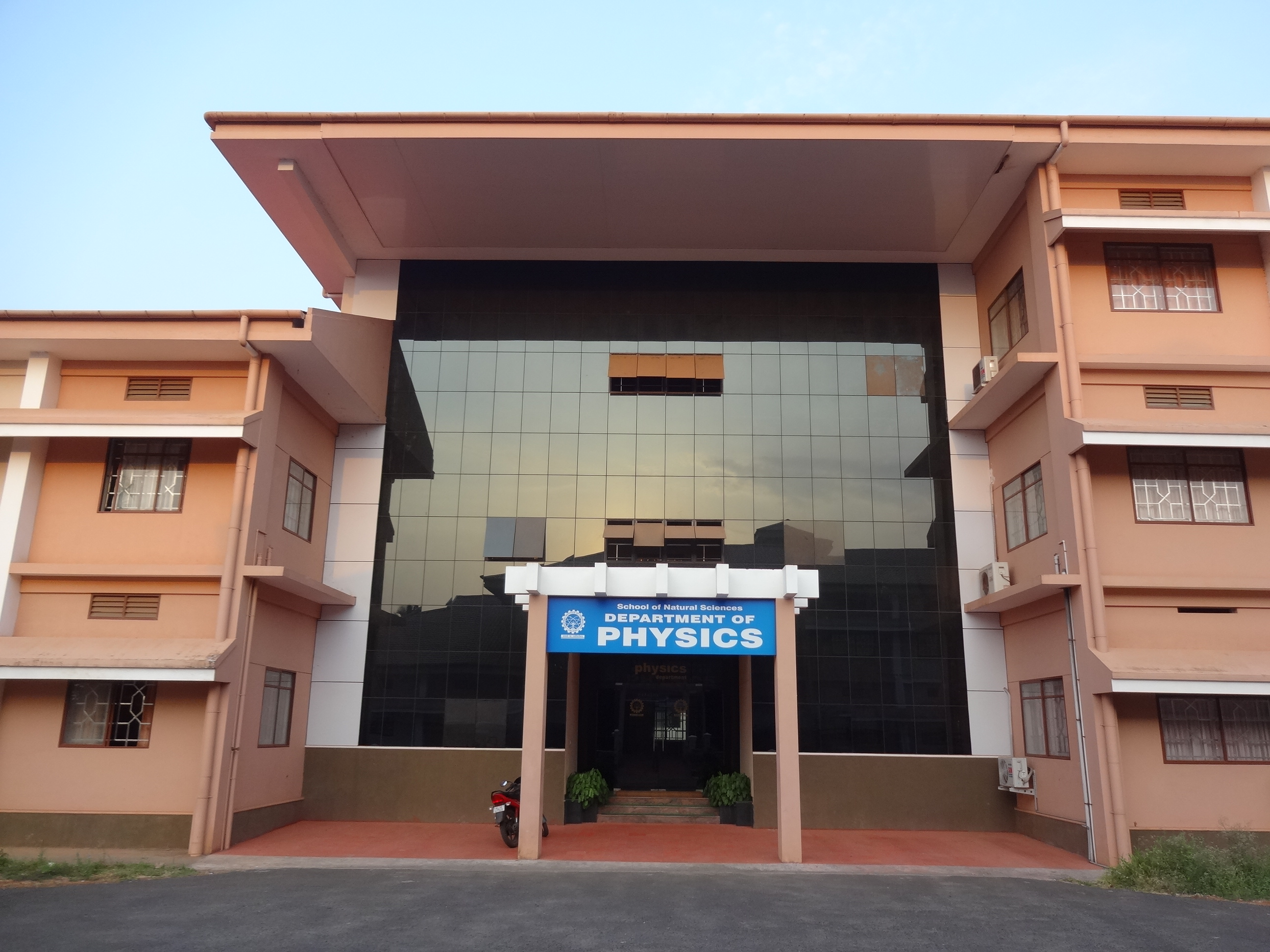
NIT

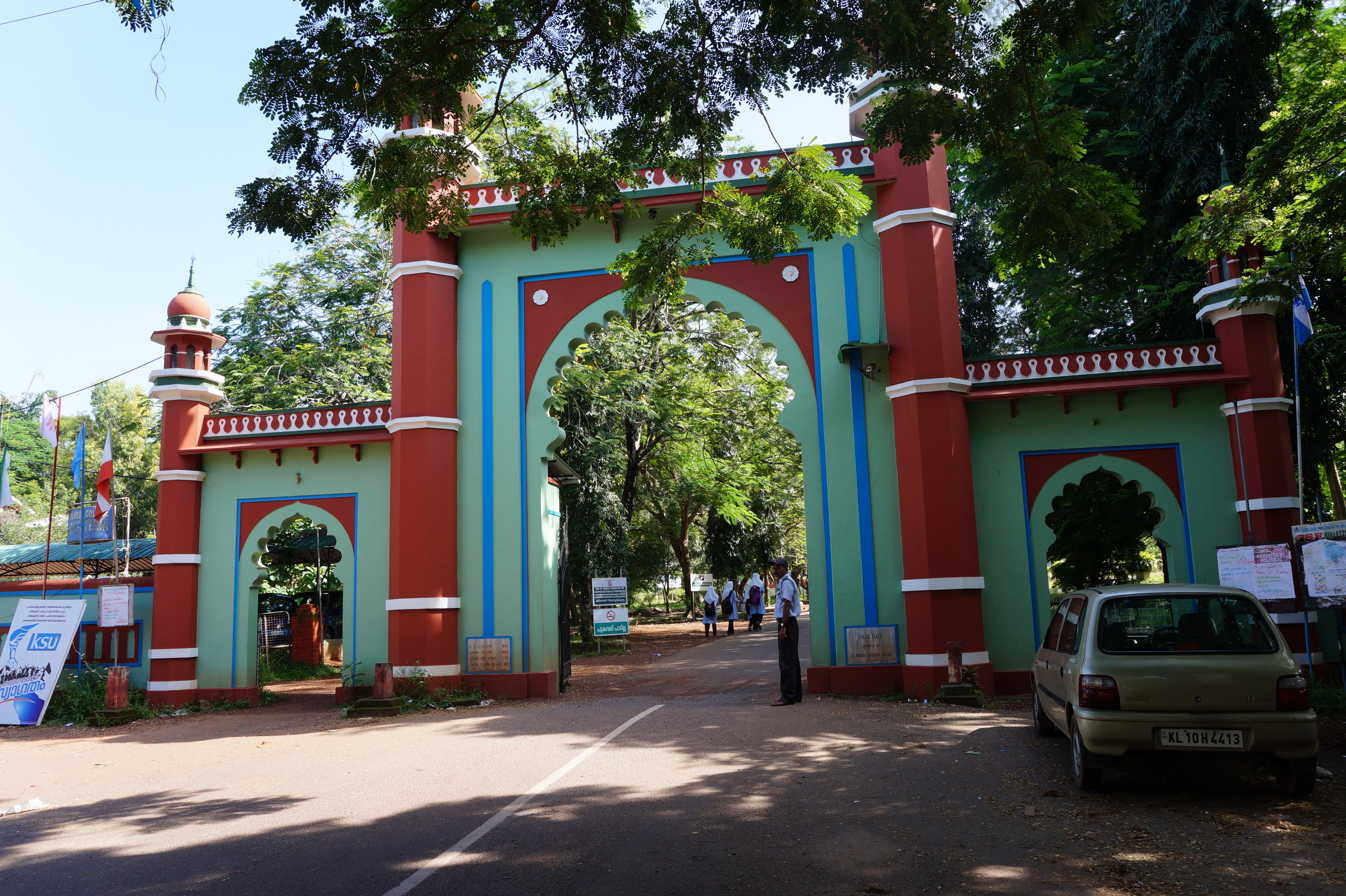
Farook College

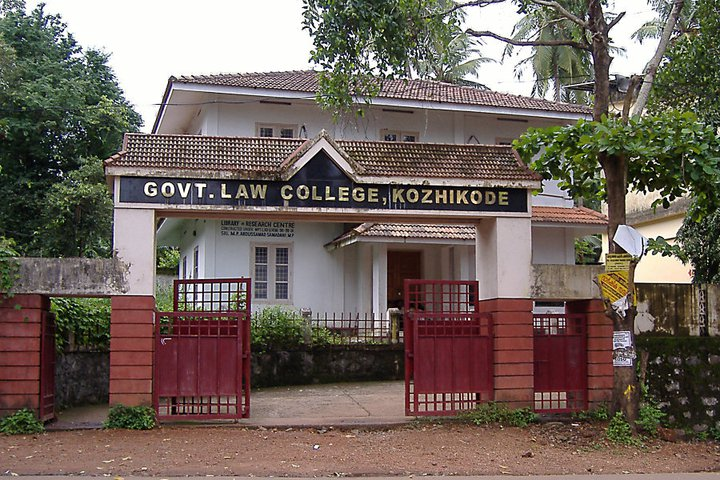
Law College

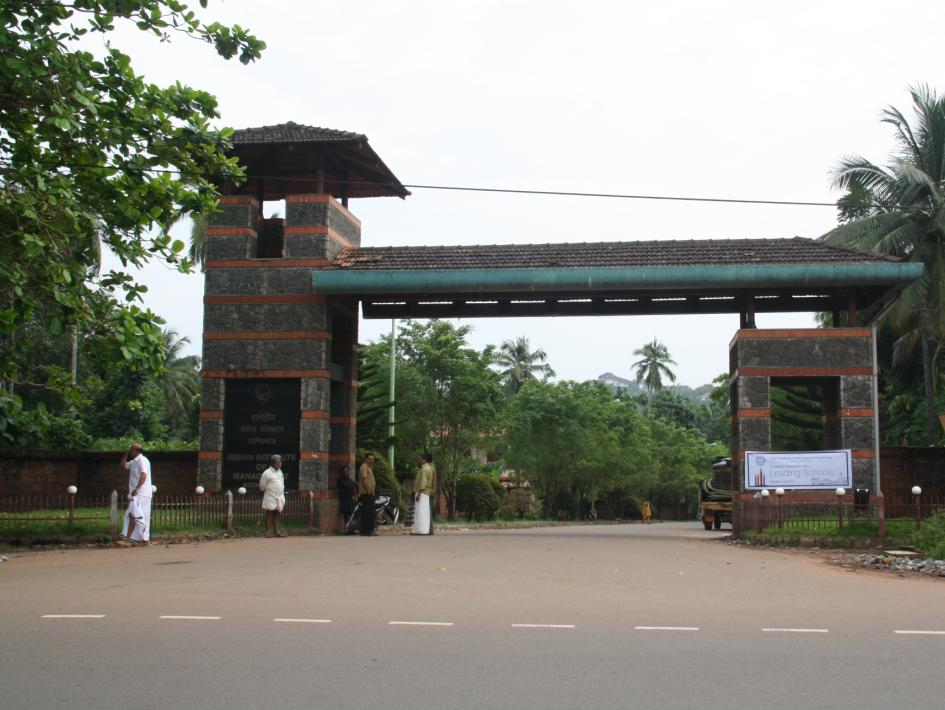
IIM

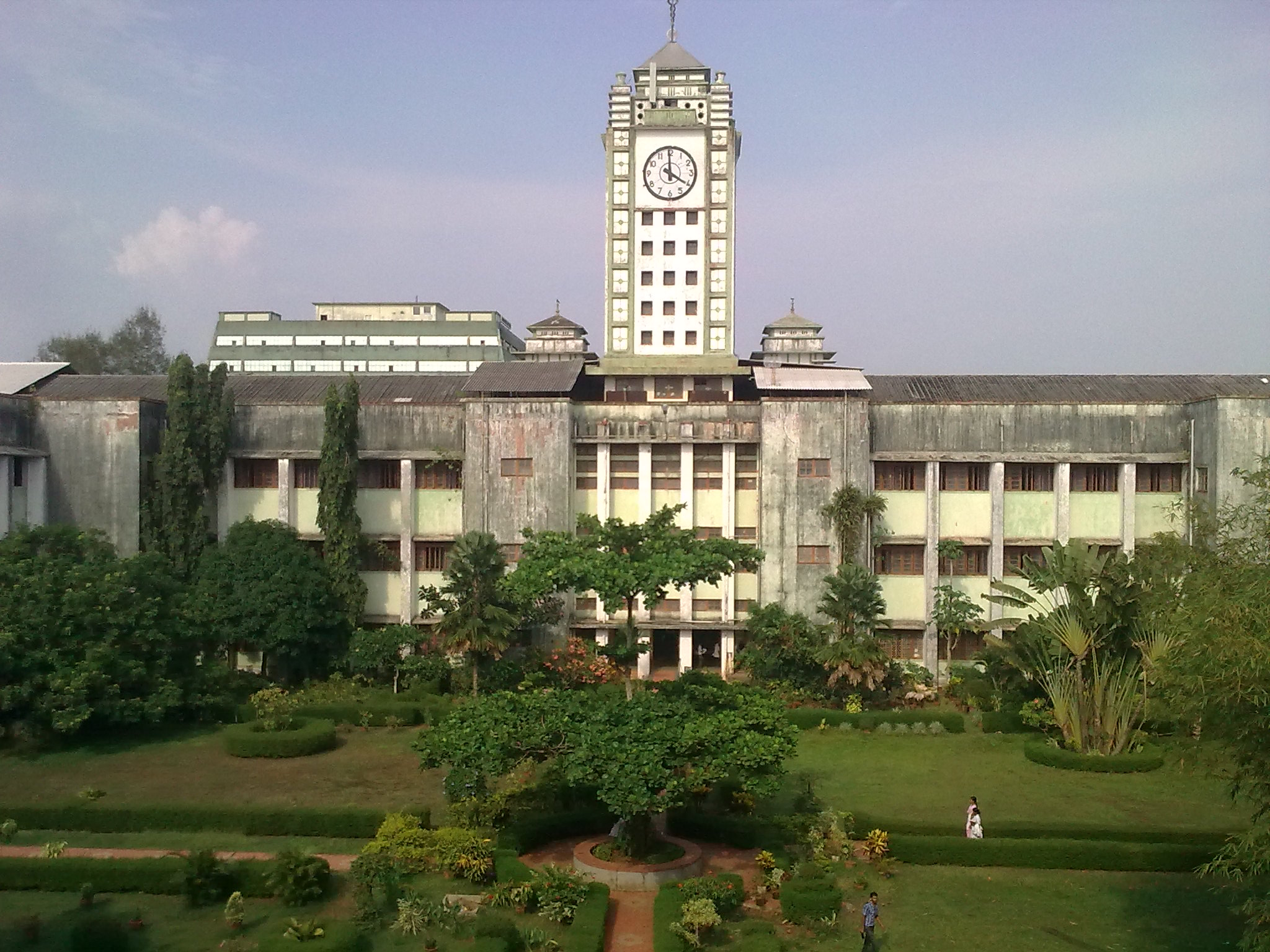
Medical College

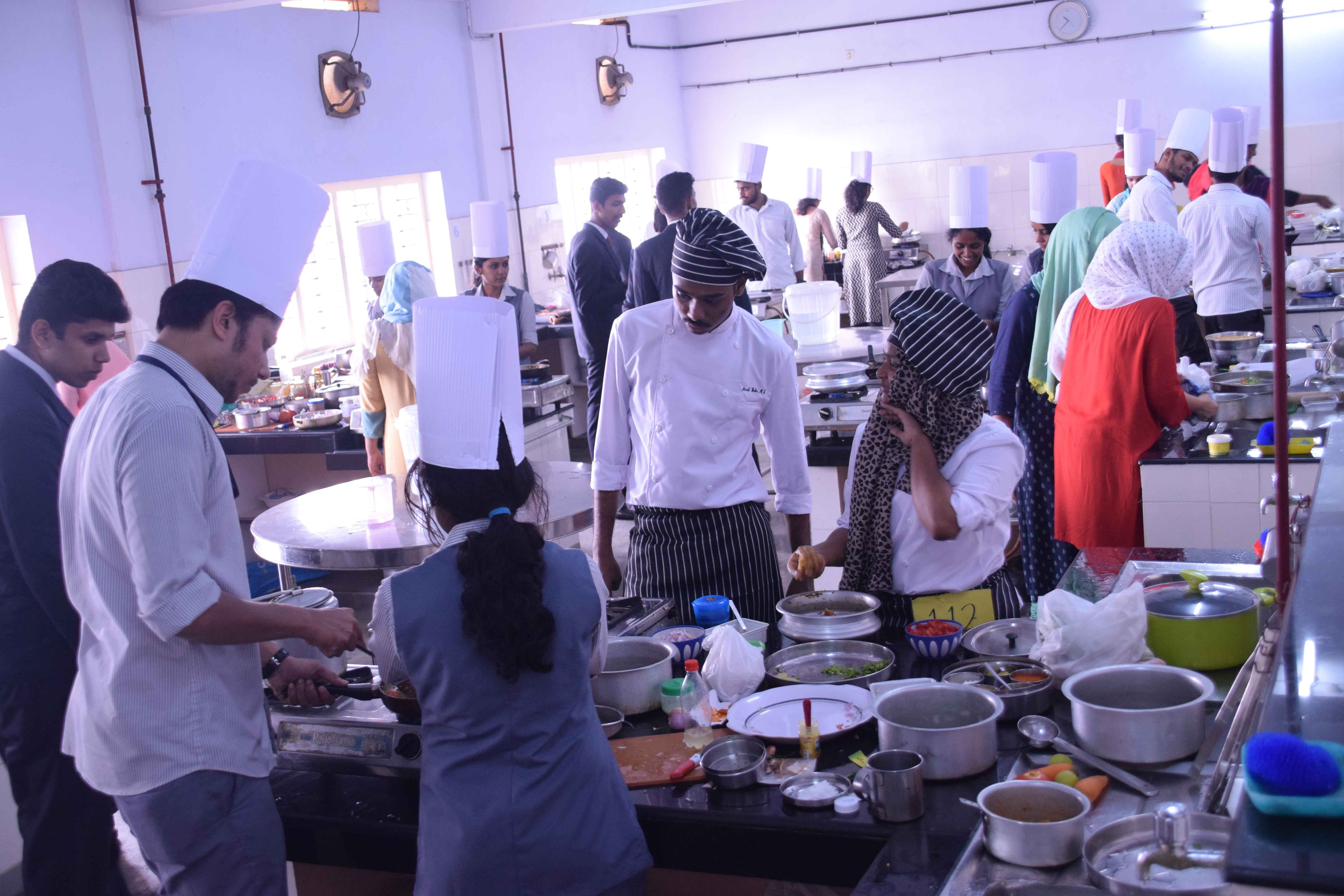
Holy Cross Institute of Management and Technology Hotel Management
