= College of Engineering, Kallooppara =

Engineering college in Kerala, India

- കോളേജ് ഓഫ് എഞ്ചിനീയറിംഗ് കല്ലൂപ്പാറ
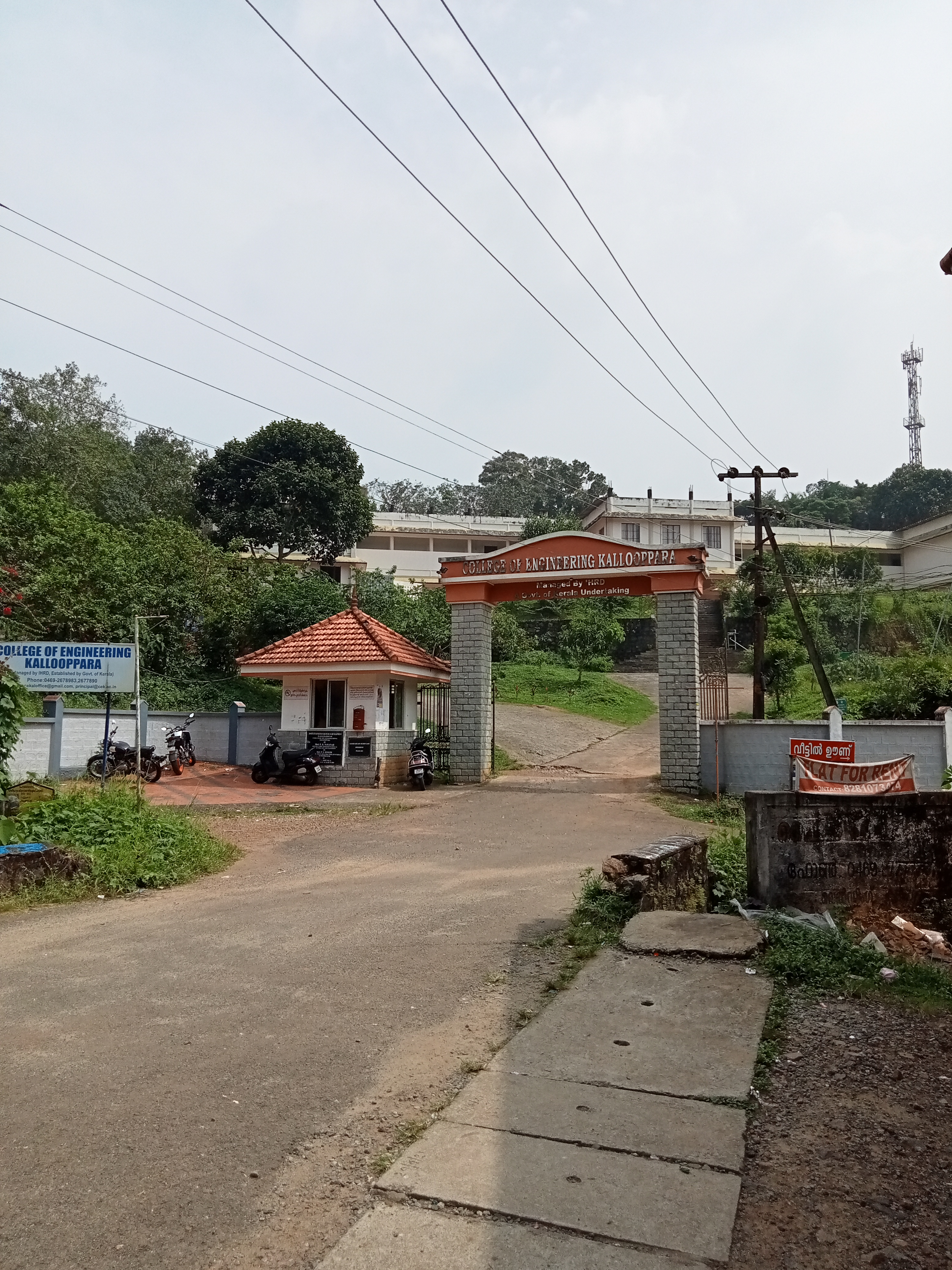
- Type: public
- Established: 1999
- Academic affiliations: APJ Abdul Kalam Technological University
- Principal: Dr. Nisha Kuruvilla
- Location: Pathanamthitta, Kerala, India; 9.4129°N 76.6426°E
- Website: http://cek.ac.in

The College of Engineering, Kallooppara (CEKPR), is an engineering college located in Kallooppara in the Pathanamthitta District of Kerala. It was established by the Institute of Human Resources Development in 2004 ( re affiliation). The college is affiliated to the APJ Abdul Kalam Technological University and approved by All India Council for Technical Education.

== Hostel ==
There is a college hostel for girls near to the college, and a hostel for men.

== Courses ==
Undergraduate Courses

The college offers undergraduate B.Tech programs and a postgraduate M.Tech program.

- B.Tech in Computer Science and Engineering (CSE)
- B.Tech in Computer Science and Engineering - Cyber Security
- B.Tech in Electronics and Communication Engineering
- B.Tech in Electrical and Electronics Engineering

In addition to B.Tech, the college also offers the following D.Voc (Diploma in Vocation) and B. Voc programs

- D.Voc in Electronic Manufacturing Services
- D.Voc in Software Development
- B.Voc in Cyber Security

Postgraduate Courses

- M.Tech in Cyber Forensics and Information Security

== Location ==
CEKPR is situated in the hills of Pathanamthitta district Kallooppara. The Thiruvalla railway station and bus station are 8 km from the college.

== Gallery ==
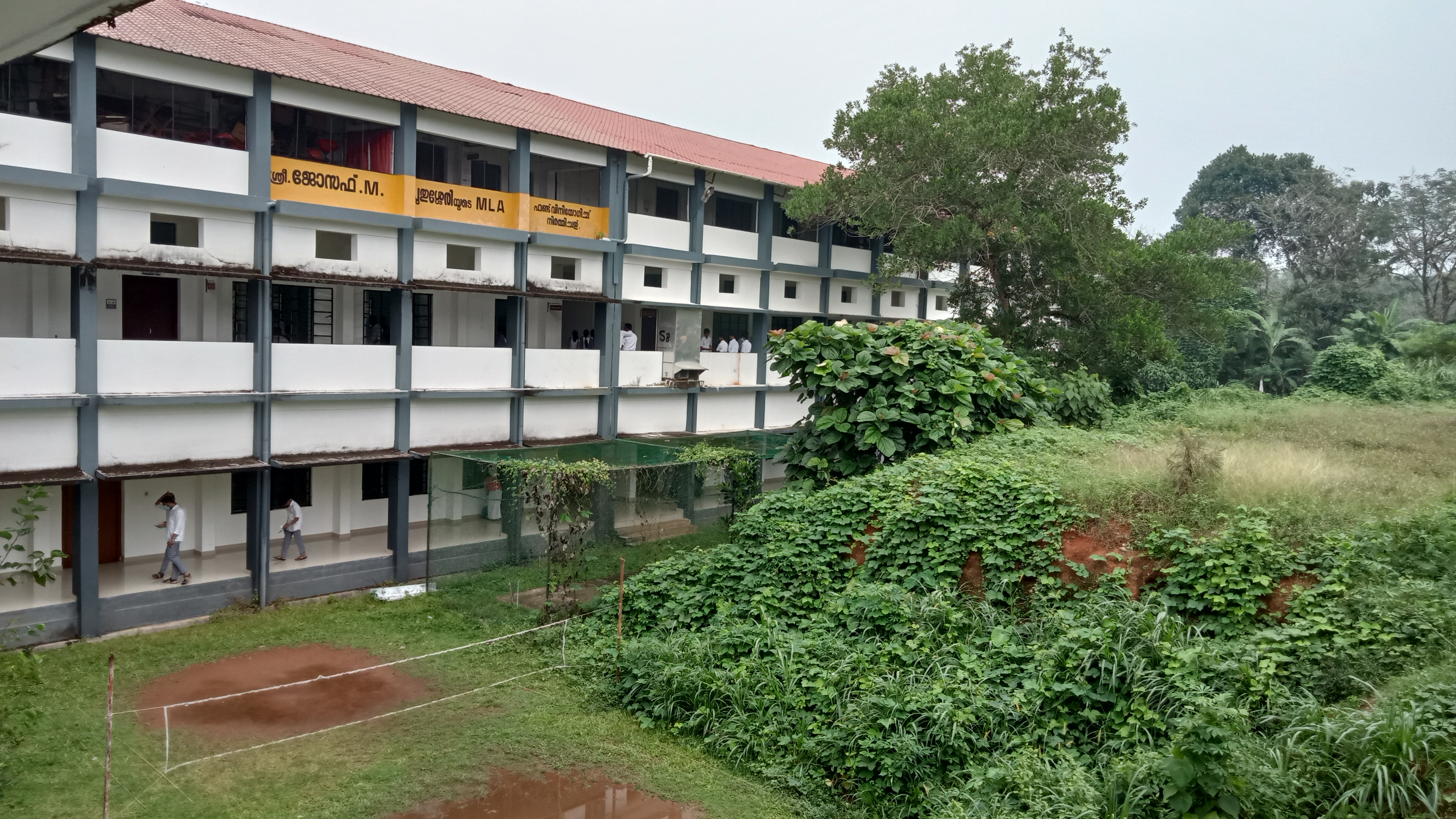

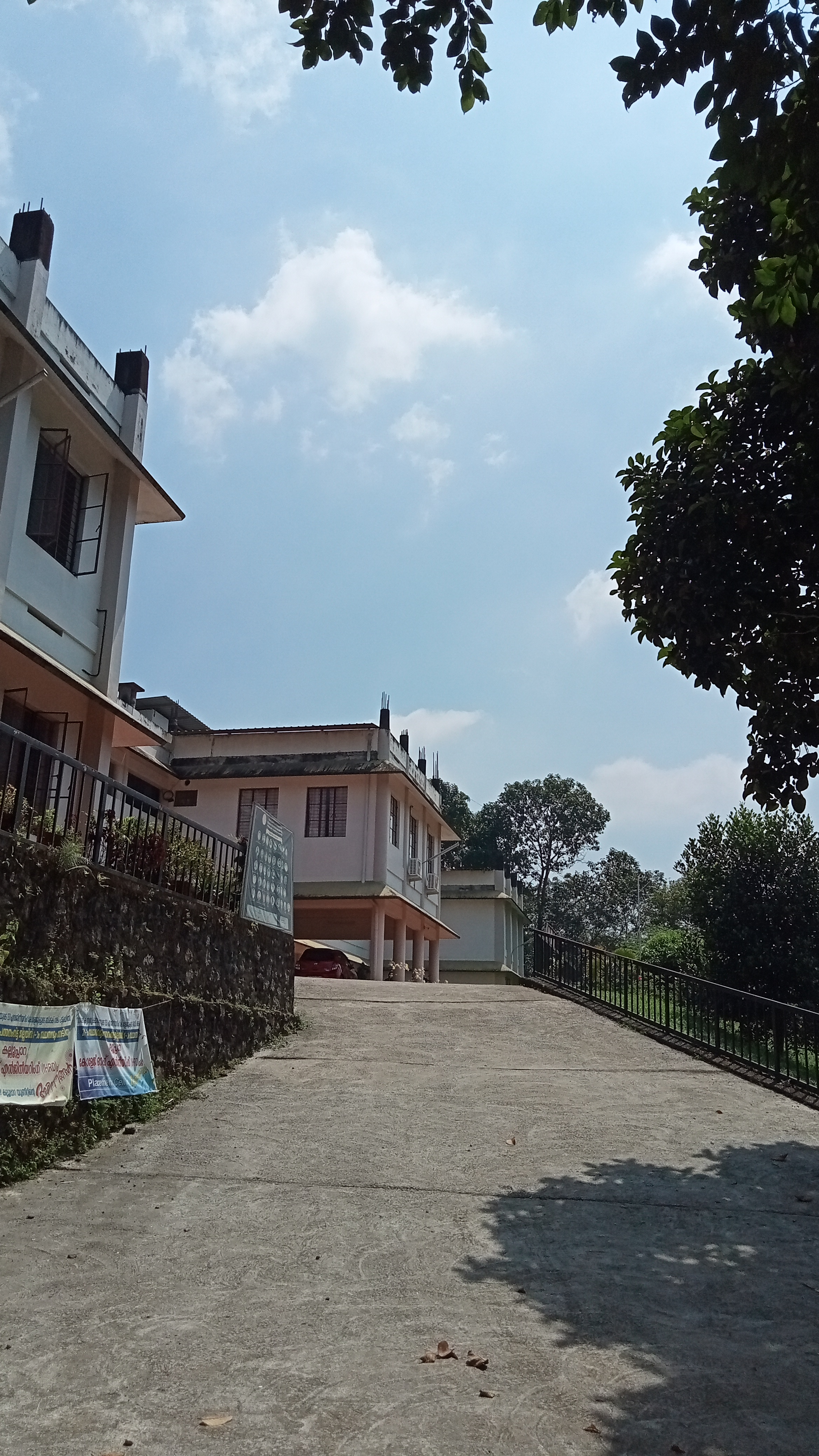

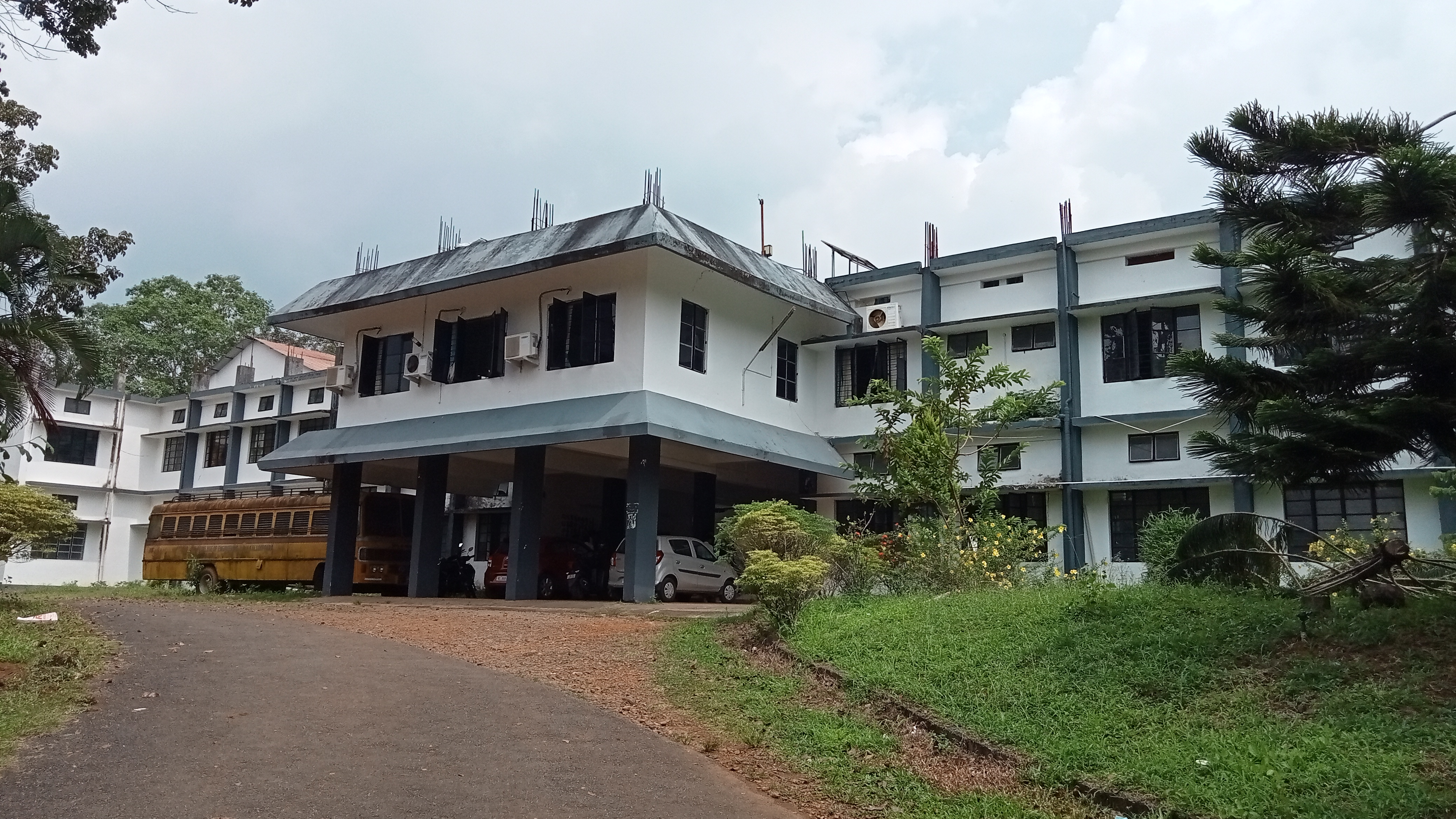
