= Thiruthiyad =

Thiruthiyad Vazhayur
- Village
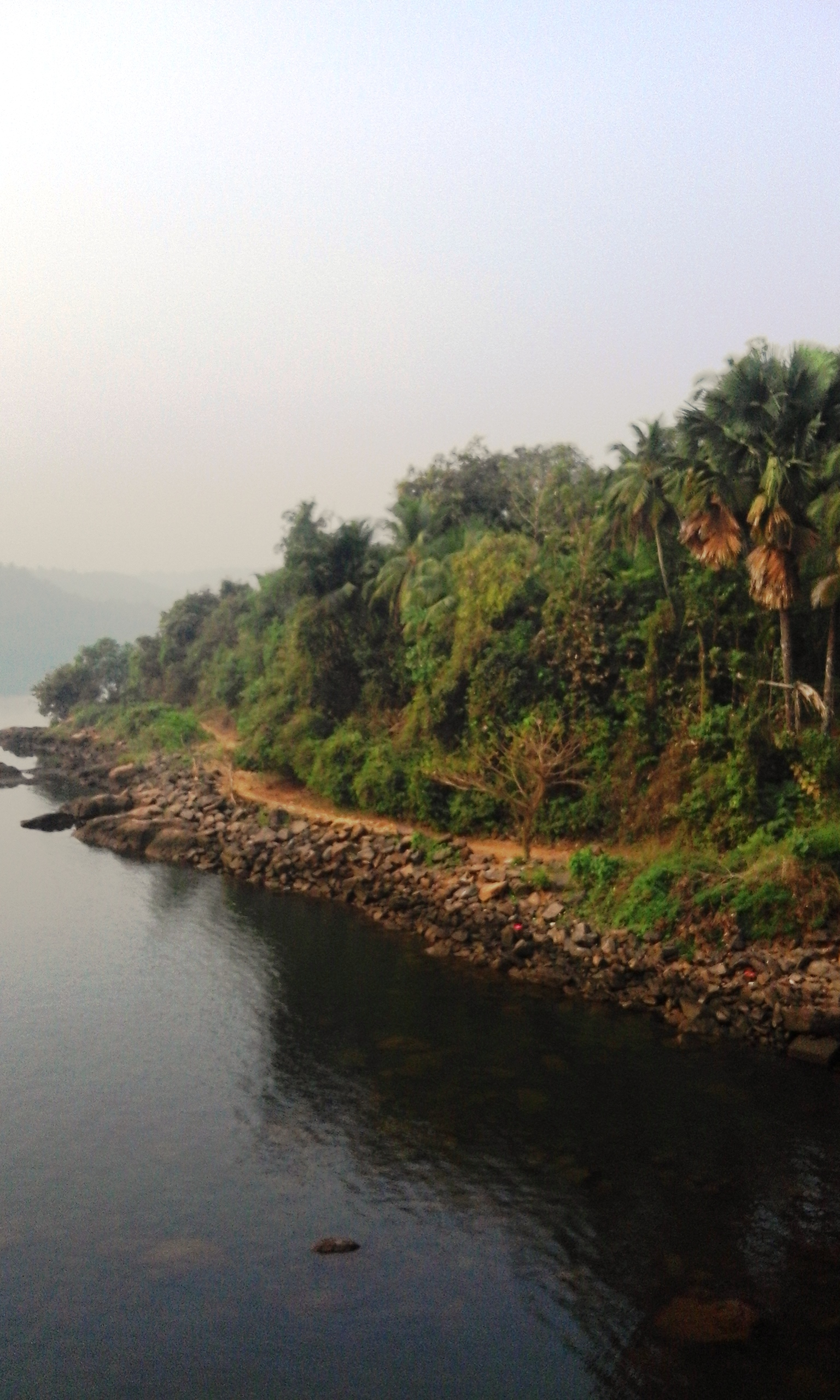
- View from Oorkkadavu Bridge
- Interactive map of Thiruthiyad
- Coordinates: 11.22593°N 75.88836°E
- Country: India
- State: Kerala
- District: Malappuram

Government
  - Member of Parliament: M.K. Ragravan (Indian National Congress)
- Elevation: 3.4 m (11 ft)

Thiruthiyad is a village near Vazhayur in Malappuram district, also accessible from Mavoor town through the Oorkkadavu bridge. It is on the Chaliyar river. The village contains lots of banana cultivation and paddy fields.

== Culture ==
Thiruthiyad village is as predominantly Muslim populated area. The culture mainly compromises of Muslim traditions, such as Duff Muttu, Kolkali and Aravanamuttu. Many local mosques are connected to libraries, giving a rich source of Islamic studies. Some of the books are written in Arabi-Malayalam, a version of the Malayalam language written in Arabic script. People gather in mosques for the evening prayer and continue to sit there after the prayers discussing social and cultural issues. Business and family issues are also sorted out during these meetings.

There is also a Hindu population, though small in comparison to that of the Muslim population, who keep their rich traditions by celebrating various festivals in their temples. Hindu rituals take place with a regular devotion like other parts of Kerala.

== Transportation ==
Thiruthiyad village connects to other parts of India through Feroke town to the west, and Nilambur to the east. National Highway No. 66 passes through Pulikkal and the northern stretch connects to Goa and Mumbai. The southern stretch connects to Cochin and Trivandrum. State Highway No. 28 starts from Nilambur and connects to Ooty, Mysore and Bangalore through Highways.12, 29 &181. The nearest airport is at Kozhikode. The nearest major railway station is at Feroke.

== See also ==
- Beypore
- Feroke
- Kadalundi
- Kadalundi Bird Sanctuary
- Karuvanthuruthy
- Vallikkunnu
- Chaliyar river
