= Model Engineering College =

Indian public engineering institute in Kochi, Kerala (founded 1989)

Model Engineering College, Cochin
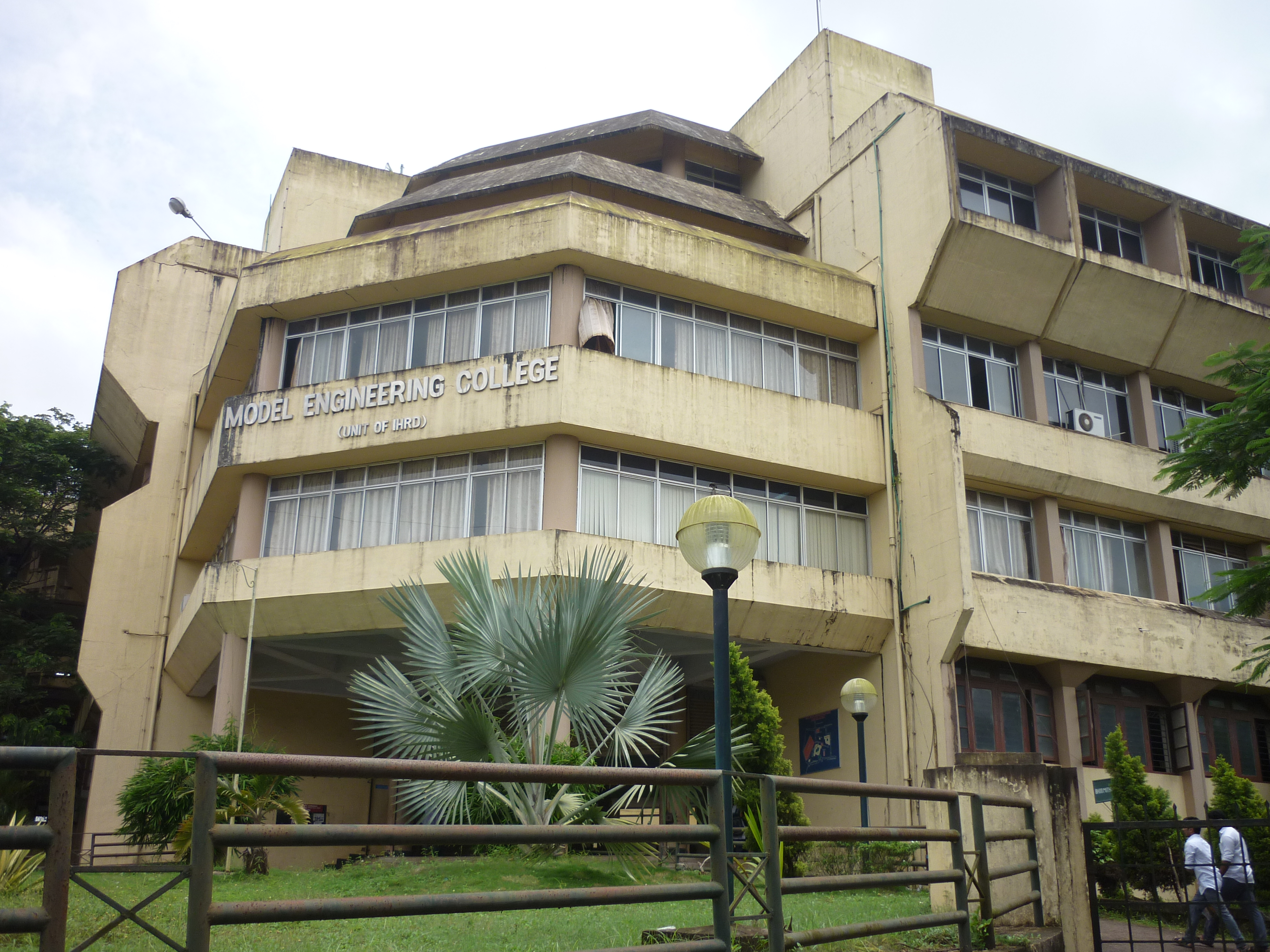
- Main entrance to the college
- Motto: Evolve into an academy of excellence to serve the knowledge society
- Type: Government cost-sharing technical institute and research centre
- Established: 9 October 1989 (37 years ago)
- Accreditation: National Board of Accreditation (NBA)
- Affiliations: List: 1. All India Council for Technical Education (AICTE); 2. Institute of Human Resources Development (IHRD)
- Academic affiliations: Universities (Since 1989): 1. APJ Abdul Kalam Technological University (Since 2015); 2. Cochin University of Science and Technology (1989-2015)
- Principal: Dr. Mini
- Faculty: 125
- Undergraduates: 2400
- Postgraduates: 156
- Doctoral students: 20
- Location: Model Engineering College, Thrikkakara, Kochi, Kerala, 682021, India; 10.028437425541668°N 76.32887717241515°E
- Campus: Urban 30 acres (120,000 m^{2})
- Language: English, Malayalam
- Acronym: MEC
- Colors: Red White
- Website: www.mec.ac.in (Official website); www.xmec.in (Alumni website)

- Location within Kochi Location within Kerala Location within India

Model Engineering College or MEC is a government cost-sharing technical institute and research centre in Thrikkakara, Kochi, Kerala, India. It was established by the Institute of Human Resources Development (IHRD), an autonomous agency under the Government of Kerala, in 1989. It is affiliated to the APJ Abdul Kalam Technological University (KTU) since 2015.

MEC was previously affiliated to the Cochin University of Science and Technology (CUSAT) until 2015. 'Excel' is the annual national techno-managerial festival conducted by MEC since 2001 under the motto "Inspire, Innovate, Engineer".

All B.Tech. programs offered by the institute are accredited by the National Board of Accreditation (NBA).

== History ==
MEC was established in 1989 by the Institute of Human Resources Development (IHRD), an autonomous technical educational research institute established by the Government of Kerala in 1987. MEC was the first institute in Kerala to be affiliated to the Cochin University of Science and Technology (CUSAT). The institute shifted into its current campus in 1994. It is affiliated to the APJ Abdul Kalam Technological University (KTU) since 2015.

== Campus ==
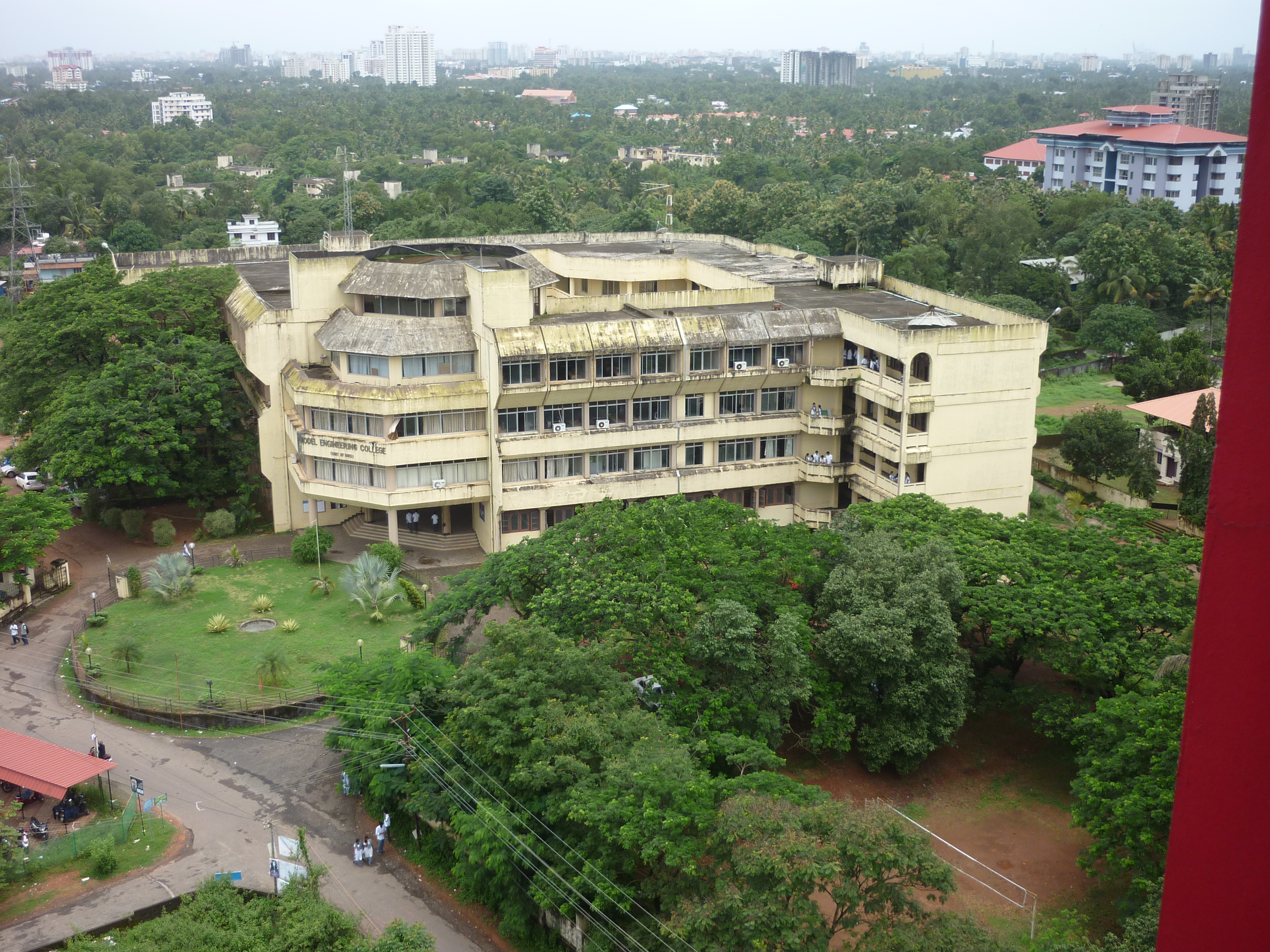
The main academic block

=== Facilities ===
- Additional Skill Acquisition Programme (ASAP) Kerala Delivery Platform
- Amphitheatre
- Basketball ground
- Cafeteria
- Central Computing Centre
- Central Library
- College Buses
- Counselling Facility
- Football ground
- Gymnasium
- Laboratories and Workshops
- Main Auditorium
- Mens Hostel
- Open air theatre
- Placement Cell
- State Bank of India ATM
- University Research Centre
- Wi-Fi

== Organization and Administration ==
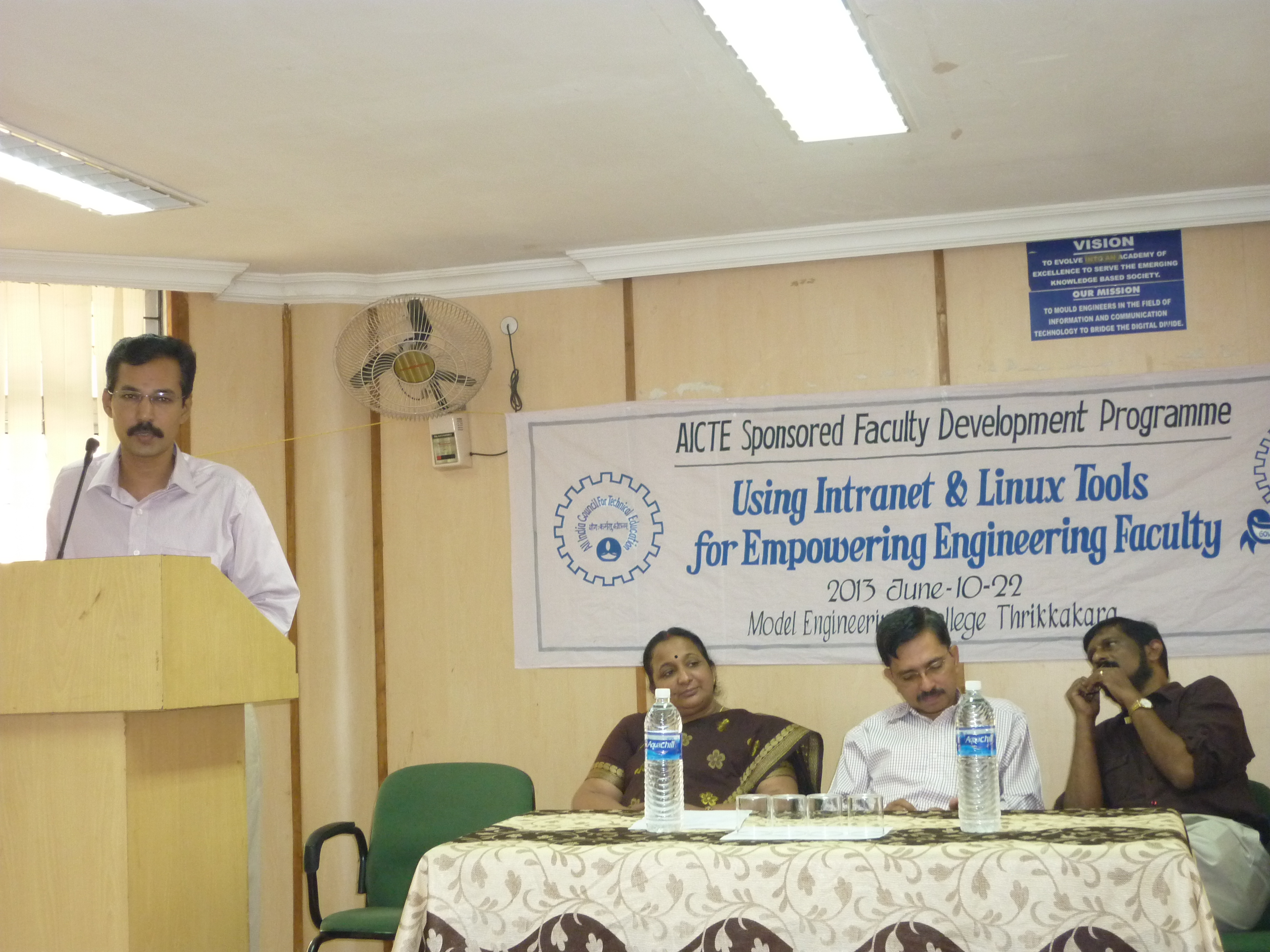
Faculty development program sponsored by All India Council for Technical Education (AICTE) at MEC

=== Governance ===
The Board of Governors (BoG) of MEC is constituted by the Institute of Human Resources Development. It includes educationalists, industrialists, representatives from All India Council for Technical Education (AICTE), University Grants Commission (UGC), Indian Institutes of Technology (IIT), APJ Abdul Kalam Technological University (KTU), a state government nominee from its department of higher education, the college principal, and some faculty members.

=== Departments ===
The institute has six departments. They are:

- Department of Computer engineering
- Department of Electronics and Communication engineering
- Department of Electrical and Electronics engineering
- Department of Electronics and Biomedical engineering
- Department of Mechanical engineering
- Department of Applied Sciences

== Academics ==
=== Undergraduate programs ===
MEC offers four-year long undergraduate academic degrees with a sanctioned annual intake of 660 students in the following nine programmes:

- Computer engineering: 180 seats
- Electronics and communication engineering: 120 seats
- Computer engineering (Business systems): 60 seats
- Electronics engineering (VLSI Design and Technology): 60 seats
- Electrical and electronics engineering: 60 seats
- Electronics and biomedical engineering: 60 seats
- Mechanical engineering: 60 seats.
- Electronics and communication engineering for working professionals: 30 seats
- Electrical and electronics engineering for working professionals: 30 seats

Students who successfully complete these academic programs from the institute will receive a Bachelor of Technology (B.Tech.) degree issued by the APJ Abdul Kalam Technological University at the end.

All B.Tech. courses offered by the institute are accredited by the National Board of Accreditation (NBA).

=== Post Graduate programs ===
The institute also offers two-year long postgraduate academic degrees with a sanctioned annual intake of 78 students in the following four specialisations:

- VLSI design and embedded systems: 24 seats
- Data science: 18 seats
- Energy management: 18 seats

Students who successfully complete these academic programs from the institute will receive a Master of Technology (M.Tech.) degree issued by the APJ Abdul Kalam Technological University at the end, since its Government college GATE score is one of the criteria For Admission.

=== Admission ===
The admission procedure and the fee structure for the academic programmes offered by the institute are decided by APJ Abdul Kalam Technological University (KTU) and Institute of Human Resources Development (IHRD) respectively.

Admissions to the undergraduate programs are based on the ranklist prepared after the performance of applicants in the KEAM Entrance Test conducted by the Commissioner of Entrance Examinations (CEE), Kerala. 15% of total seats to the programs offered by the institute are reserved for Non-Resident Indians (NRIs).

Admissions to postgraduate programs offered by institute are based on the ranklist of Graduate Aptitude Test in Engineering (GATE) conducted by Indian Institutes of Technologies (IITs). The vacant seats are filled based on nativity, percentage of marks obtained, and reservation criteria of the students.

=== Research ===
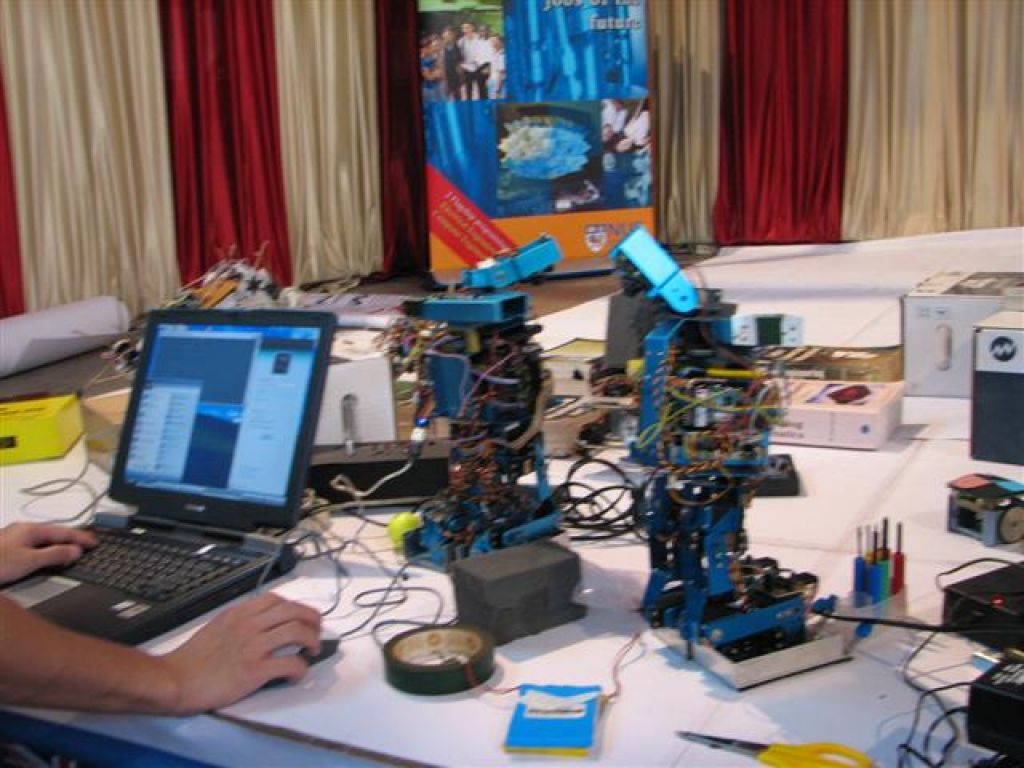
Robotics Workshop at MEC

MEC was the first engineering college in Kerala to be recognised by Cochin University of Science and Technology as the research centre of university in the branch of Electronics and communication engineering in the year 2010. The research areas in 2010 included Digital image processing, Signal processing, and Optical communication.

Later, the APJ Abdul Kalam Technological University (KTU) extended the research into various specialisations including Microwave engineering, Biomedical Signal and Image Processing, VLSI and Embedded systems, Reliability engineering, etc.

In September 2022, the APJ Abdul Kalam Technological University (KTU) decided to establish a Centre of Excellence (CoE) at MEC for advanced learning and research in the following fields of Computer engineering with industrial linkages:

- Artificial intelligence (AI)
- Machine learning (ML)
- Robotics
- Automation

The university research centre will come up at a space of around 60,000 sq.ft in the institute.

== Traditions and student activities ==
The foremost student body of the institute is the Senate, which consists of elected representatives from each stream. The institute has several students bodies, of both technical and non-technical nature.

=== Technical bodies ===
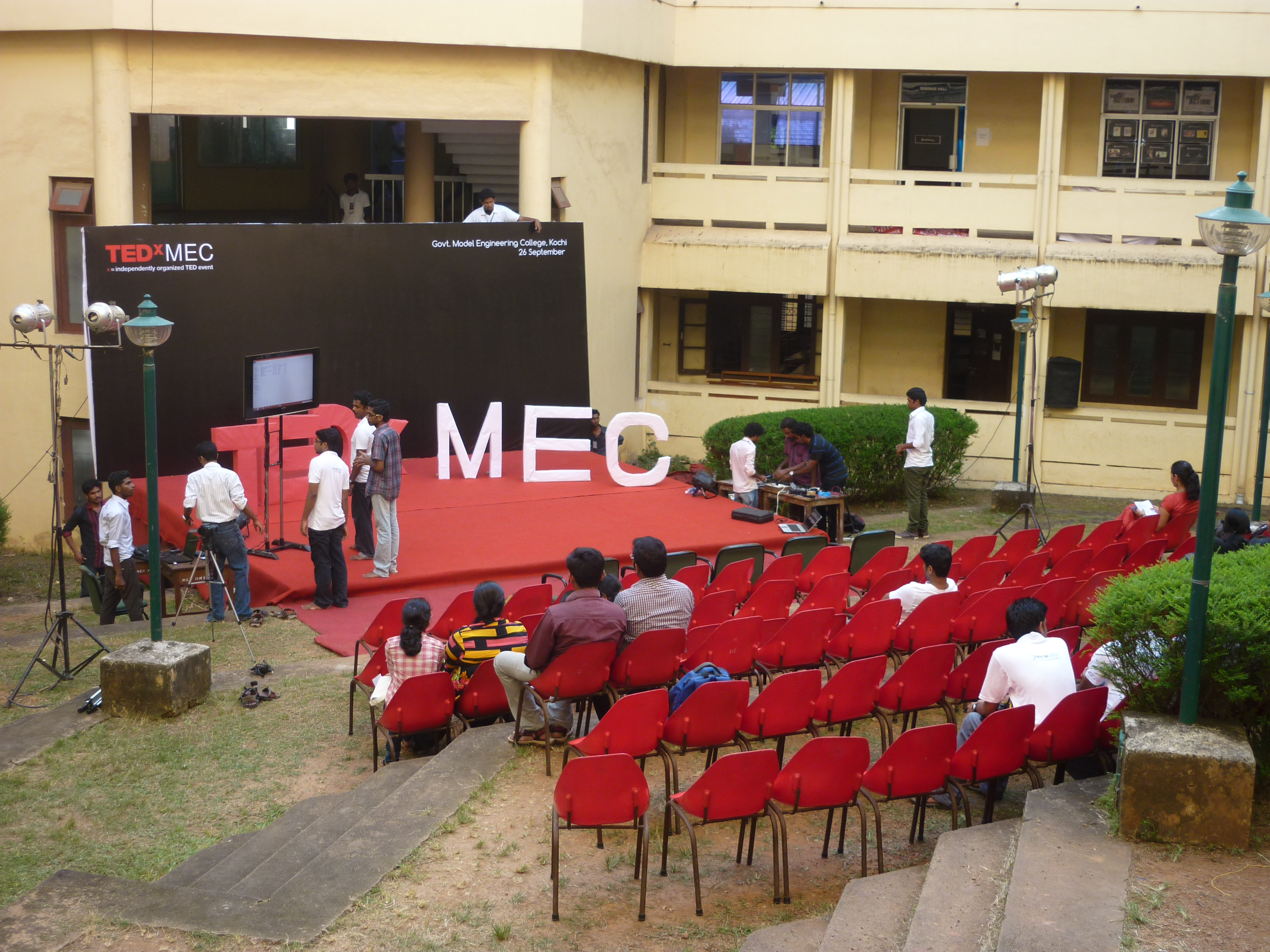
A meeting conducted by TEDx MEC

These include the Innovation and Entrepreneurship Development Cell (IEDC MEC), which is a fully functioning student body registered under the Technology Business Incubator of MEC. The cell provides a platform for students to work on their ideas and take it further. IEEE student's branch, Electronics Association (Mixed Signals), the Electrical Minds Forum (EMF), the MEC Association of Computer Students (MACS), the Biomedical Association (BMA), the Model Amateur Radio Association (MARC), the FOSS MEC, the IETE Students Branch, the TEDx MEC, the Topgear MEC (mechanical association), a robotics Club named Cyborg and NSDC MEC are some of the other student technical bodies in the institute.

There are multiple tech community and club branches in MEC which are highly active in supporting the students gain knowledge in core technical and related subjects. They include:

- Hack Club MEC: MEC branch of the international community 'Hack Club'.
- DSC MEC: MEC branch of Developer Students Club (Google).
- Tinkerhub MEC: MEC branch of Tinkerhub Kerala.

=== Non-technical bodies ===
These include the Illuminati (quizzing fraternity), the Debate Club, The Book Thieves (Literature Club), Bharathanam ( Music Club), the Bhoomitrasena (environmental club), and the National Service Scheme chapter among many others.

=== Excel ===
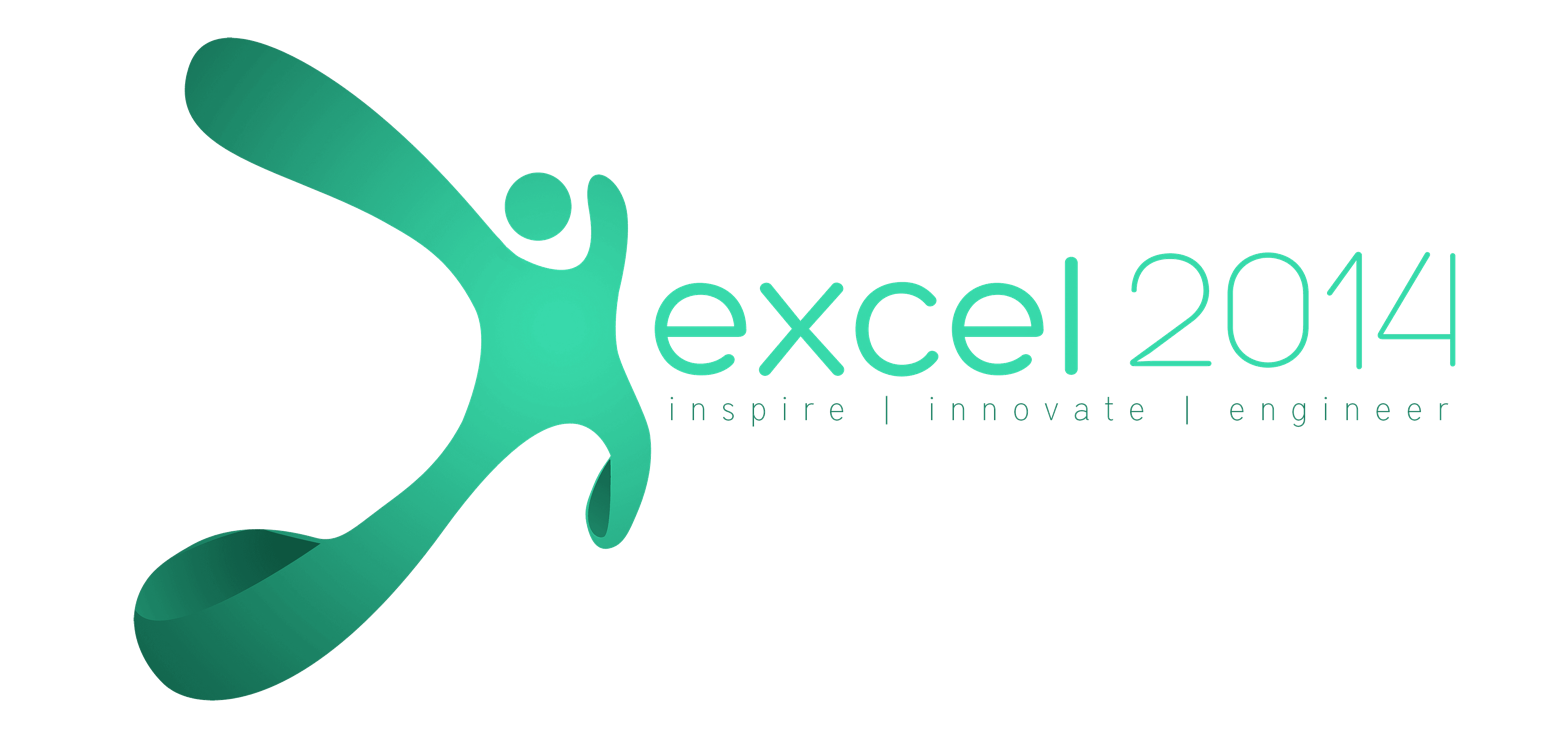
Official logo of Excel 2014

Excel is the annual national techno-managerial festival conducted by MEC under the motto "Inspire, Innovate, Engineer". The event is held over a period of three days and is conducted in association with the IEEE Student Branch of the college. The festival has been held every year since its inception in 2001. It has been held as an All India Annual Technical Fest since its beginning in 2001.

=== Technopreneur ===
It is the annual national level entrepreneurial and managerial symposium of MEC and the flagship event of IEDC MEC. The first edition of Technopreneur, Technopreneur 2006, went on to win the Best Yi-Net event at the CII National Summit in Mumbai. The 13th edition of Technopreneur will be held in March 2023. The symposium attracts over 2000 participants across the nation.

=== Arts and sports ===
Arts and sports festivals are conducted every year by the college senate. The College Senate divides students into 4 houses, each with a captain and a co-captain. The houses compete with each other for the Arts, Sports and Overall trophies across multiple events. Houses are formed exclusively for the arts and sports competitions and are dissolved soon after. There is a college inauguration ceremony. Arts and Sports festivals are conducted annually in the even semesters. The Arts festival of the university is named Sargam which was later changed to Layatharang. Chakravyuh is the name given to the annual sports meet. MEC was the overall champion of CUSAT inter-college arts fest SARGAM-2013 consecutively for the third time.

== Placements ==
Despite the COVID-19 pandemic, MEC graduates of 2019-20 batch got nearly 100% placements in 2020. Almost all of the 360 students who graduated from the institute in 2020 got recruited by over 80 companies during the campus placement drive conducted by MEC. The multinational corporations who recruited graduates from the campus in 2020 include Amazon, Microsoft, Robert Bosch GmbH, LinkedIn, ServiceNow, Amadeus IT Group, Deloitte, Synopsys, FactSet, Cypress Semiconductor, Oracle Corporation, and redBus. The highest pay package was around ₹30 Lakhs per Annum during the pandemic year. The median pay package was ₹6.6 lakh per annum for product companies and ₹4.5 lakh per annum for service-based companies.

== Alumni ==
xMEC is the official alumni network of MEC.

== See also ==
- APJ Abdul Kalam Technological University
- All India Council for Technical Education
- Cochin University of Science and Technology
- Institute of Human Resources Development
