= Erathu =

- village
- Location in Kerala, India Erathu (India)
- Coordinates: 9°8′0″N 76°42′0″E
- Country: India
- State: Kerala
- District: Pathanamthitta

Population (2011)
  - Total: 24,880

Languages
  - Official: Malayalam, English
- Time zone: UTC+5:30 (IST)
- PIN: 6XXXXX
- Vehicle registration: KL-

Erathu is a gram panchayat in Pathanamthitta district, Adoor Tehsil, Parakod Block in the state of Kerala, India. This panchayat covers the revenue entity of Erathu village and has an area of 21.74 km^{2}.

== Demographics ==
As of 2011 India census, Erathu had a population of 24880 with 11626 males and 13254 females.

== Boundaries ==
East- Ezhamkulam Panchayat and Adoor Municipality

West- Kadampanad Panchayat and Pallickal Panchayat

North- Pallickal Panchayat and Adoor Municipality

South- Ezhamkulam Panchayat and Kadampanad Panchayat

== Wards ==
As of now Erathu consists of 17 wards. The number of wards have been increased over the years according to the increase in population though there was no increase in the land area.

1. Manakala
2. Vellaramkunnu
3. Ayyankoickal
4. Paruthippara
5. Murukankunnu
6. Kilivayal
7. Vayala
8. Pulimala
9. Puthusseribhagom
10. Maharshikkavu
11. Chathannooppuzha
12. Choorakkodu
13. Sreenarayanapuram
14. Anthichira
15. Thuvayoor vadakku
16. Janashakthi
