= List of schools in Pathanamthitta district =

This is a list of schools recognised by Kerala government in Pathanamthitta district of Kerala, India. The list is not at all complete.

== Schools affiliated to the Kerala Board of Public Examinations ==
=== Pathanamthitta Educational District ===
==== Government Schools ====
Sl No	school	Location
1	Govt. HSS Chittar	Chittar
2	Govt. HSS Pathanamthitta	Pathanamthitta
3	Govt. HSS Kalanjoor	Kalanjoor
4	Govt. HSS Vechoochira Colony	Vechoochira
5	Govt. Hss Ayroor	Ayroor
6	Govt. HSS Kadimeenchira	Kadimeenchira
7	Govt. HSS Omalloor	Omalloor
8	Govt. HSS Edamuri	Edamuri
9	Govt. HSS for girls Adoor	Adoor
10	Govt. HSS for boys Adoor	Adoor
11	Govt. HSS Aranmula	Aranmula
12	Govt. HSS Elanthoor	Elanthoor
13	Govt. Hss Elimullumplackal	Elimullumplackal
14	Govt. HSS Kadammanitta	Kadammanitta
15	Govt. HSS Kaipattoor	Kaipattoor
16	Govt. HS Kattachira Tribal	Kattachira Tribal
17	Govt. HS Keekozhoor	Keekozhoor
18	Govt. HSS Kissimum	Kissimum
19	Govt. HSS Kizhakkupuram	Kizhakkupuram
20	Govt. Hss Kokkathode	Kokkathode
21	Govt. HSS Konni	Konni
22	Govt. HS Koodal	Koodal
23	Govt. HS Kozhencherry	Kozhencherry
24	Kulanada Panchayat HSS(Panchayath School)	Kulanada
25	Govt. HSS Mancode	Mancode
26	Govt. HS Maroor	Maroor
27	Malayalappuzha JMPHS(Panchayath School)	Malayalappuzha
28	Govt. Hss Naranganam	Naranganam
29	Govt. VHSS Nedumon	Nedumon
30	Govt. HSS Pathanamthitta Model Residential School	Vadasserikkara
31	TMGHSS Peringanad	Edamuri
32	Govt. HSS Thekkuthode	Thekkuthode
33	Govt. HSS Thengamam	Thengamam
34	Govt. HSS Thumpamon North	Thumpamon North
35	Govt. HSS Vadakkedathucavu	Vadakkedathucavu
36	Govt.LPS Arukalickal	Arukalickal

==== Private aided schools ====
Sl No	school	Location
1	SVGV Higher Secondary School, Kidangannoor	Kidangannoor
2	Adoor NSS HSS	Vadakkedathucavu
3	PCHS Pulloopram, Ranni	Pulloopram
4	MSHSS Ranni	Ranni
5	SC HSS Ranni	Chellakadu
6	M G M HSS PATHANAMTHITTA	THIRUVALLA
7	BALIKAMADOM GHSS, THIRUVALLA	PATHANAMTHITTA
8	C M S HSS, MALLAPPALLY	MALLAPPALLY
9	N S S HSS, KUNNANTHANAM	KUNNANTHANAM
10	S T B C HSS, CHENGAROOR P O	MALLAPALLY
11	N S S HSS, THATTAYIL	THATTAYIL
12	St. Thomas Higher Secondary School, Kozhencherry	KOZHANCHERY
13	CATHOLICATE HSS	PATHANAMTHITTA
14	S N D P HSS, VENKURINJI	VENKURINJI
15	N S S HSS, THADIYOOR	THADIYOOR
16	PADMANABHODAYAM HSS, MEZHUVELI	MEZHUVELI
17	D B HSS, THIRUVALLA	THIRUVALLA
18	S N V HSS, ANGADICAL SOUTH	ANGADICAL SOUTH
19	S N D P HSS, CHENNEERKKARA	CHENNEERKKARA
20	ABRAHAM M M HSS	EDAYARANMULA
21	NSS HSS, KAVIYOOR	KAVIYOOR
22	DBHSS, PARUMALA, KADAPRA	PARUMALA, KADAPRA
23	ST JOHNS HSS, ERAVIPEROOR	ERAVIPEROOR
24	SNDP HSS, MUTTATHUKONAM	MUTTATHUKONAM
25	ST BAHANAN`S HSS, VENNIKKULAM	VENNIKKULAM
26	NSS BOYS HSS, PANDALAM	PANDALAM
27	MG HSS, THUMPAMON	THUMPAMON
28	HSS, SEETHATHODE	SEETHATHODE
28	PSVPM HSS, AYRAVON, KONNI	KONNI
30	SNDP HSS, KARAMVELI	KARAMVELI
31	ST THOMAS HSS, ERUVALLIPRA	ERUVALLIPRA
32	MT HSS, PATHANAMTHITTA	PATHANAMTHITTA
33	CMS HSS, KUZHIKKALA	KUZHIKKALA
34	AMM Higher Secondary School, Edayaranmula	Edayaranmula, Pathanamthitta, Kerala 35.[netaji school, pramadom)] Pramadom, pathanamthitta, Kerala

==== Schools Affiliated to International General Certificate of Secondary Education (IGCSE) ====
Sl No	school	Location
01	NSK International School	Pathanamthitta District, Kerala

== Schools affiliated to the Central Board of Secondary Education (CBSE) ==
Sl No	School	Location
1	Al-Ihsan Central School	Niranam
2	All Saints Public School	Adoor
3	Amrita Vidyalayam	Pandakm
4	Amrita Vidyalayam	Kallarakadvu
5	Amrita Vidyalayam	Thiruvalla
6	Anjaneya Saraswathy Vidya Mandiram	Vaipur
7	Archbishop Mar Gregorios Public School	Kaviyoor
8	Arsha Vidya Jyothi Public School	Adoor
9	Believers Church Residential School	Thiruvalla
10	Bhavans Vidya Mandir	Pathanamthitta
11	Carmal Central School	Payyanamon
12	Carmel Convent English Medium School	Thadiyoor
13	Christ Central School	Thiruvalla
14	Christhuraja Public School	Mallappally
15	Citadel Residential School	Ranny
16	Eminence English Medium School	Pandalam
17	Grace Mount Residential School	Kumbanad
18	Gurukul Mount Public School	Kunnathnam
19	Holy Angels Model School	Mundukottakal
20	Immanuel Marthoma Central School	Eraviperor
21	Jawahar Navodaya Vidyalaya	Vechoochira
22	Kendriya Vidyalaya	Adoor
23	Kendriya Vidyalaya	Pathanamthitta
24	Little Flower Public School	Mukkoottuthara
25	M G M Central School	Kodumon
26	Mar Dionysius School	Mallappally
27	Mar Theophilose Bethany Covent Public School	Vennikulam
28	Marthoma Senior Secondary School	Kozhencherry
29	Mary Matha Public School	Pathanamthitta
30	Mathen Mappilai Memorial Public School	Ayroor
31	Mount Bethany Public School	Kumbazha
32	National Central School	Parakode
33	Newman Central School	Adoor
34	Nicholson Syrian Central School	Thiruvalla
35	Nirmal Jyothi Public School	Mallappally
36	Oonianthala Eapen Memorial Public School	Eraviperur
37	Padamasree Central School	Adoor
38	Rose Dale Residential School	Ranny
39	S N Public School	Konni
40	Santa Maria Public School	Makkapuzha
41	Savio English School	Naranganam
42	Sree Narayana Central School	Ranny
43	Sree Vijayananda Vidya Peedom	Aranmula
44	St Gregorios English Medium School	Kaipattoor
45	St John's School	Thumpamon
46	St Mary's Central School	Thiruvalla
47	St. Marys Residential Public School	Thiruvalla
48	St Stephen's Public School	Kudassanad
49	Stella Maris English Medium School	Thiruvalla
50	Sundarsanam Central School	Aranmula
51	Syndesmos Public School	Parumala
52	Syrian Jacobite Public School	Thiruvalla
53	Thapovan Public School	Adoor
54	Travancore International School	Adoor

== Schools affiliated to the Indian Certificate of Secondary Education (ICSE) ==
Sl No	School	Location
1	Bethany Academy	Vennikulam
2	Evershine Residential School	Makkamkunnu
3	Good Shepherd E. M. School	Kurianoor
4	Hawksworth Vidyapith	Thiruvalla
5	Holy Family Public School	Chittar
6	M. K. Letha Memorial Public School	Konni
7	Mar Thoma Residential School	Thiruvalla
8	Mount Zion Residential School	Kadammanitta
9	Pathanamthitta Public School	Onnukal
10	Sankaramangalam Public School	Kaviyoor
11	Seventh Day Adventist English Medium Residential School	Pathanamthitta
12	Seventh Day Adventist Higher Secondary School	Thiruvalla
13	Shalom Public School	Chenneerkara
14	Sophia International Academy	Mallappally
15	Sri Adwayananda Public School	Edayaranmula
16	Zion English Medium School	Ayoor
