= Moothala =

Village in Trivandrum - Kollam District Border

Moothala is a village located at the border of Trivandrum district and Kollam district bordered by Ithikkara River in Pallickal panchayat of Thiruvananthapuram, Kerala, India.

The Tourist Attraction Vallabhankunnu Hilltop was just 2km away from Moothala Junction offering nature view in the morning and evening sections. The Village is known for the temples such as Parayil Ayyappa Temple, Chemmaram Durga Devi Temple, Sivapuri Ardhanariswara Temple, Sree Narayana Guru Mandiram and Juma Masjid are with in 1 km from Moothala Junction which shows the cultural & spiritual landmarks of the village. The Temple Festivals, Library Festivals and Club Anniversary are the major events in the village.

Majority of the people are Farmers, Govt Employees and NRI's. In recent years villagers has witnessed significant entrepreneurs. Notable Personalities like Arundas Haridas Founder of Accovet, Akhin Jas Indian Volleyball Player are hailing from this village.
