= Vadakkadathukavu =

Coordinates: 9.1342°N 76.7368°E

- Village
- Interactive map of Vadakkadathukavu
- Country: India
- State: Kerala
- District: Pathanamthitta

Languages
  - Official: Malayalam, English
- Time zone: UTC+5:30 (IST)
- PIN: 691523
- Vehicle registration: KL-26
- Nearest city: Adoor
- Lok Sabha constituency: Pathanamthitta
- Vidhan Sabha constituency: Adoor
- Climate: Good (Köppen)

Vadakkadathukavu is a village in Pathanamthitta district, Kerala, India.

== Places of worship ==
- Vadakkadathukavu Devi Temple

== Education ==
- GVHSS, Vadakkadathukavu
