= Peringanadu =

- village
- Location in Kerala, India Peringanadu (India)
- Coordinates: 9.152490°N 76.698760°E
- Country: India
- State: Kerala
- District: Pathanamthitta

Population (2011)
  - Total: 20,638

Languages
  - Official: Malayalam, English
- Time zone: UTC+5:30 (IST)
- PIN: 691551
- Telephone code: 04734
- Vehicle registration: KL-26
- Nearest city: Adoor
- Lok Sabha constituency: Pathanamthitta
- Vidhan Sabha constituency: Adoor

Peringanadu is a village in Pathanamthitta district, Kerala state, India. It is known by the presence of Peringanadu Trichenda Mangalam Mahadeva Temple.

== Culture ==
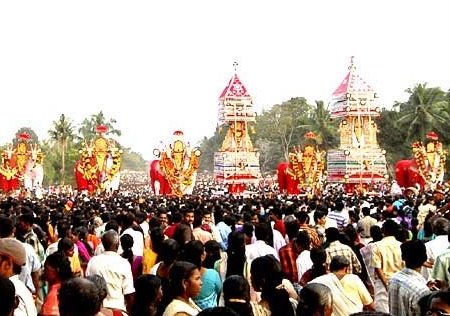
Kettukazhcha at Trichenda Mangalam Mahadeva Temple

Peringanad is a small village located near Adoor. the village boasts of secular feeling entrenched in its soul. It is expressed through various festivals and celebrations, prominent among them are ulsavam in the month of March–April, the Christian festivals of valiya perunnal at peringanad valiya pally and St. Gregorios and St. George. The very famous Shiva Temple, Peringanad Trichenda Mangalam Mahadeva Temple is located here. The Temple is famous for its 'Kettu Kazhcha' during the annual festival. Kettu Kazhcha is the procession of huge chariot(thaeru) and bull(Kaala) made of wood and cloth by groups belonging to different areas(kara).

Marthashmooni Orthodox Valiya Pally is called "peringanad Valiya Pally","poovankunnu pally" &" peringanad Pally"(Malankara Orthodox Syrian Church), established in 1850 AD, located at Moonnalam-Peringand, is the first church the name of Marthashmooni(Marth Shmooni /St. Shmuni), her Seven Children and their teacher Mar Eliazer (St. Eliazer) in India & & eastern pilgrim center. essential Perunnal on Makaram 14,15 (Malayalam era). The daughter church St. Gregorious Orthodox Church is also located at this place.

  [3]

Famous Malayalam satirist E.V. Krishna Pillai lived in Peringanad. Adoor Bhasi, a famous comedian in Malayalam Cinema, is the son of E.V. Krishna Pillai. Malayalam writer Munshi Paramu Pillai also belongs to Peringanad.

== Demographics ==
As of 2011 India census, Peringanadu had a population of 20638 with 9642 males and 10996 females.

== See also ==
- Adoor
- Adoor Gopalakrishnan
- College of Engineering Adoor
- Pathanamthitta
