= Mithrapuram =

Village in Pathanamthitta District, Kerala, India

Mithrapuram is a small village in Pathanamthitta district, Kerala, south India, and is 4 kilometers away from Adoor.

== Etymology ==
The name "Mithrapuram" means "land of friends" in the Malayalam language. Previously, the name was the home address of "Mylathadathil" family in Mithrapuram. Later this place was popularised as "Mithrapuram".

== Location ==
Mithrapuram is located near Adoor. The MC Road State Highway 1 (Kerala) passes through this place. The public can only access K.S.R.T.C buses because private buses have limited kilometers to pass through the MC Road.

== Economy ==
Most of the people in this area engage in Rubber tree agriculture.

== Transportation ==
The nearest railway station is Chengannur railway station 20 km from Mithrapuram and the nearest airport is Trivandrum International Airport 100 km from Mithrapuram.

== Distances to major places ==
- Sabarimala - 90 km
- Valiyakoickal Temple - 9 km
- Pandalam - 8 km
- Parumala Palli - 30 km
- Thiruvananthapuram - 91 km
- Kochi - 125 km

== Major attractions ==
- Bishop's house(Amalagiri estate).

== Charitable institution ==
- Kasturba gandhi bhavan DE-ADDICTION centre.

== Industries ==
- Indus motors and workshop.

== Schools ==
- Udayagiri S.N. Public school (CBSE)
- The Travancore International School (CBSE), since 2011
- Mar Chrysostom College of Arts & Science

== See also ==
- Pandalam
- Kurampala
- Adoor
- Adoor Gopalakrishnan
- College of Engineering Adoor
- Pathanamthitta
