= Manakala =

Manakala Manakkala
- Town
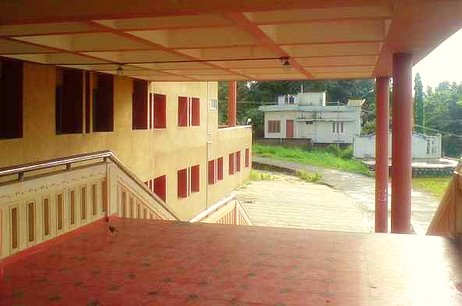
- College of Engineering Adoor, Manakala
- Interactive map of Manakala
- Coordinates: 9°8′0″N 76°43′0″E
- Country: India
- State: Kerala
- District: Pathanamthitta

Languages
  - Official: Malayalam, English
- Time zone: UTC+5:30 (IST)
- PIN: 691551
- Telephone code: 04734
- Vehicle registration: KL-26 (Adoor-Sub RTO)
- Nearest city: Adoor
- Lok Sabha constituency: Pathanamthitta
- Website: www.adoormunicipality/manakala.in

Manakala is a town in Pathanamthitta district, Kerala state, India. It is located in Adoor Thaluk. Manakala is the hometown of the prominent film director Adoor Gopalakrishnan.

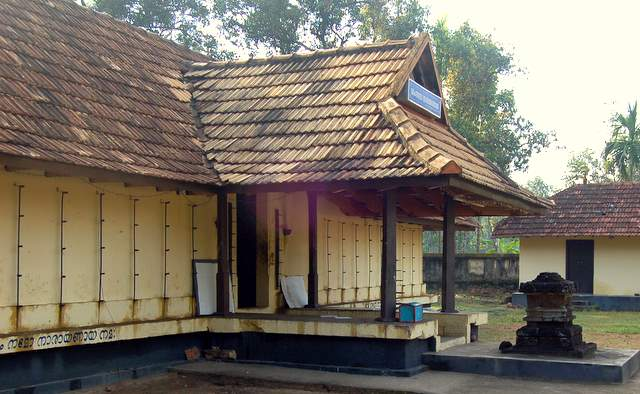
Shree Narayanapuram Temple

== Etymology ==
The name Manakala has an uncertain etymology. Manakala may stem from an imperfect Malayalam portmanteau fusing Manal ("Sand") and Kaala ("Land" or "Place"). Thus Manalkaala means place covered by sand. Most of Manakala is covered by sand.

== Education ==
Manakala is home to one of the best Engineering colleges, College of Engineering Adoor under Cochin University of Science and Technology and the students here have secured many University Ranks in the past years. One of the Government polytechnique Colleges is situated here.

== Temples ==
The Vishnu temple, Sreenarayanapuram Temple which is more than 200 years old is located here. The Shiva temple, Peringanadu Trichendamangalam Mahadeva Temple which is known for its 'Kettu Kazhcha' during the annual festival is located 2 km from Manakala.

== Churches ==
There are few Churches of prominence in this area. St. Marthsmooni Orthodox Syrian church, St. Thomas Marthomite Church, Six numbers of Church of South India churches, Bible College and related institutions of Sharon Pentecostal Mission are commendable establishments and contribution of Christian Community in this part.

- Faith Theological Seminary is the bible college of the Pentecostal church called Sharon Fellowship church. It was founded in 1970 under the leadership of Rev. Dr. T.G Koshy (Kunjumon Pastor) and Rev. Dr. P.G Jacob (Thankachan Pastor). They played a vital role in the establishment of the christian movement in Manakala and Adoor from 1960’s.

== Mannady Temple ==
Mannady Temple, which is known for Mudiyettam, and the place which has historical importance due to the Sacrifice of the Great Soldier, Travancore Diwan Veluthampy Dalava, who fought the British Raj, till his last breath, is just 6 km from here. The inhabitants of this village are dominated by Hindu community but there is a significant Christian population and a few Muslims.

== See also ==
- Adoor
- Peringanadu
- Pathanamthitta
- Adoor Gopalakrishnan
- College of Engineering Adoor
- Sreenarayanapuram Temple
