= Lalu Samuel =

Chairman of Kingston Holdings

- Born: Adoor, Pathanamthitta, India
- Education: Mar Ivanios College, Thiruvalla
- Occupations: Chairman & Managing Director of Kingston Holdings FZC
- Spouse: Lovely L Samuel
- Children: Michelle; Ashley; Angela
- Parent(s): K C Samuel Kurampil; Kunjamma Samuel
- Website: www.kingstonholdings.com

Lalu Samuel is the chairman of Kingston Holdings. He is selected as one of the top 100 Most Influential Indian Business Leaders in the Arab World by Forbes the Middle East continuously for 2013, 2014 and 2015. He is a member of the Board of Trustees of Sharjah Chamber of Commerce and Industry nominated and Board Member of the Indian Business & Professional Council in Sharjah. Sharjah issues its first Golden card visa to Lalu Samuel, Chairman of Kingston Holdings. The General Directorate of Residency and Foreigners Affairs of Sharjah has granted the first golden card visa to Lalu Samuel Chairman and managing director of Kingston Holdings and Chairman of Sharjah Industry Business Group. i. Motive: The 10-year visa is a part of the long-term permanent residency system tailored for investors and entrepreneurs aims to attract capital, investments, and owners of leading companies, professionals, researchers and students to engage them in the renaissance and development of the UAE. ii. Rights: The golden cardholders are entitled to have the privileges and facilities including a residency visa without a sponsor to them and their families and It also allows the visa holder to sponsor up to 3 workers and obtain a residency visa for one of his/her senior employees.
