= Ammakandakara =

- Village
- Location in Kerala, India Ammakandakara (India)
- Coordinates: 9°3′N 76°35′E
- Country: India
- State: Kerala
- District: Pathanamthitta

Languages
  - Official: Malayalam, English
- Time zone: UTC+5:30 (IST)
- Postal code: 691523
- Vehicle registration: KL-

Ammakandakara is a village in Parakode, Adoor in the Pathanamthitta district of Kerala, India. It is also an electoral ward in the Pallickal Grama Panchayat.

== Establishments ==
The Dairy Development Department run by the Government of Kerala has an Entrepreneurship Development Centre in Ammakandakara.

== Notable residents ==
- Ms. Vinitha V, member of the School Management Committee for Travancore International School.
- The Reverend Dr. Jose John at Ezhamkulam Mar Gregorios Church.
