= Pallickal, Thiruvananthapuram =

Pallickal
- village
- Location in Kerala, India Pallickal (India)
- Coordinates: 8.8412300°N 76.8006700°E
- Country: India
- State: Kerala
- District: Thiruvananthapuram
- Taluk: Varkala

Government
  - Body: Gram panchayat

Area
  - Total: 16.36 km^{2} (6.32 sq mi)

Population (2011)
  - Total: 16,900
  - Density: 1,030/km^{2} (2,680/sq mi)

Languages
  - Official: Malayalam, English
- Time zone: UTC+5:30 (IST)
- PIN: 695604
- Telephone code: 0470268
- Vehicle registration: KL-81

Pallickal is a panchayath in Varkala Taluk of Trivandrum district in the state of Kerala, India. It is situated 18 km east of Varkala along Varkala - Madathara State Highway 64 and 46 km north-east of capital city Trivandrum. It is known for its lush paddy fields and Land of Volleyball in south kerala. More over, this village is full of Sports enthusiasts and supporters.

== Attractions ==
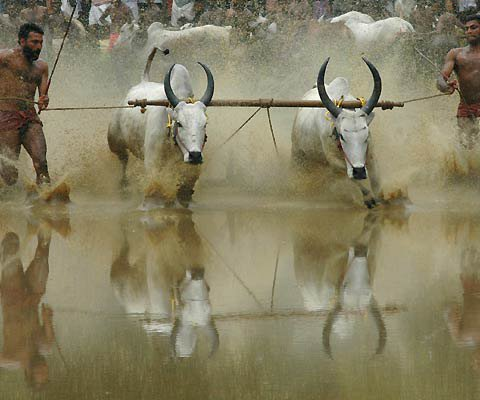
Maramadi Festival

Pallickal is famous for the sports called " Maramadi" or Bull surfing.

There are many temples in this village. They are Kodimarathinmood Devi Temple, Panappallil Bhagavathi Temple, Chazhoor Mahavishnu Temple, Pulimath Devei Temple, Anakunnam Mahadeva temple, Ayiravilli Mahadeva Temple, Ilamabarakkod Devi Temple, Parayil Sreedharmasastha temple, Mannavil Moorthi temple, Thevermukalil Ardha Nareerswara Temple, Pakalkkuri Maha Vishnu Temple, and the newly made Sree Narayana Gurudeve Temple at Moothala. There are five mosques in this village. One is situated in Pallickal town itself, which is recently renovated and Thazhebhagom Muslim Jamaath is one of the oldest mosques in this area.

== Sports ==
Pallickal is called " Home of Volleyball " in Kerala, for raising players that have played the sport at state, national and even international levels.

== Schools ==
- Govt. Higher Secondary School, Pallickal
- Govt. U.P School, Pallickal
- Pakalkuri Higher Secondary School
- Moothala LP School
- Kattuputhusseri LP School
