= Enadimangalam =

- village
- Location in Kerala, India Enadimangalam (India)
- Coordinates: 9.138056°N 76.822500°E
- Country: India
- State: Kerala
- District: Pathanamthitta

Area
  - Total: 30.77 km^{2} (11.88 sq mi)

Population (2011)
  - Total: 20,568
  - Density: 668.4/km^{2} (1,731/sq mi)

Languages
  - Official: Malayalam, English
- Time zone: UTC+5:30 (IST)
- PIN: 691524
- Vehicle registration: KL-03

Enadimangalam is a village in the Pathanamthitta district of the state of Kerala, India. Enadimagalam includes mainly Elamanoor and Maroor. Enadimagalam is often recognised as a Panchayat. Enadimangalam had a population of over 20,000.

== Demographics ==
According to the 2011 Census of India, Enadimangalam had a population of 20,568 with 9,629 males and 10,939 females.

== Settlements ==
=== Kunnida and Kurumpakara ===
Kunnida and Kurumpakara are the backward area of Enadimangalam. It is located in a hilly area of the village. Anjumala Para located in border of Kunnida and Kurumpakara. Kunnida and Kurumpakara have unexplored tourist destinations.

=== Anjumala Para ===
Anjumala Para has many historical beliefs and mythical stories, so it is also called 'Ayiramthooni Mala'. Years ago the para was protected and looked after by Thannickal family and they started paddy agriculture in the land around para. Later at the time of harvesting it was notice the whole grown paddy were useless so they left it there. After three days some people went there for cattle feeding and saw the useless paddy had improved and after measuring the paddy the people recorded that it was more than Ayiramthooni (measuring unit). So it was named Ayiramthooni Mala. Anjumala Para is one of the highest mountains in the area, and it is a regular destination for students and others seeking a scenic view of the region. There is another myth related to Anjumala para that is associated with Udayonmuttam Malanada Sree Sankara Narayana Swami Temple.

The Shree Sankara Narayana Swami Temple and the Nethaji Memorial Grandhasala library are in Kurumpakara.

The population consists of Hindus, Christians and Muslims, with Hindus comprising the majority.

Kurumpakara has connections with the Poruvazhy Peruviruthy Malanada festival.

=== Elamannoor ===
Elamannoor is the center of Enadimangalam. Enadimangalam village office, panchayat office, sub registrar office and all major government offices located in Elamannoor Theater junction. This junction is also known as stadium junction major educational institutions are located in Elamannoor area. Elamannoor LPS, UPS and Elamannoor vocational higher secondary school (EVHSS) are located in Elamannoor. Kayankulam Punalur road is the main road going through Enadimangalam village. Pathanamthitta Co Operative Bank, State Bank of India, Indian postal bank and Enadimangalam Co Operative Bank with three branches (23 junction, Puthuval, and Parackal) are the main banks in Enadimangalam village. The village starts from Parackal and ends at Puthuval, the border area with Kollam district through KP road.

The Kerala Industrial Infrastructure Development Corporation (KINFRA) industrial center is in Elamannoor. A private medical college located in Chayalodu, near Kunnida. An engineering college named SNIT adoor is also within the limits of Enadangalam village nearby Theppupara. Chankoor Mahadeva temple, Maroor school, Elamannoor Mahaavishnu temple, Poothankara Sree Darmashastha temple, Kuthiramon Palam mosque, Elamannoor Orthodox church, Chankoor Catholic church are the main attractions in this village.

=== Poothamkara ===
Poothankara is a small Village/hamlet in Parakode Block in Pathanamthitta District of Kerala State, India. It comes under Enadimangalam Panchayath. It belongs to South Kerala Division. It is located 20 km towards South from District headquarters Pathanamthitta. 8 km from Parakode. 83 km from State capital Thiruvananthapuram

Poothankara Pin code is 691524 and postal head office is Elamannur.

Poothankara is surrounded by Parakode Block towards west, Vettikkavala Block towards South, Pandlam Block towards west, Konni Block towards North.

Punalur, Pathanamthitta, Mavelikkara, Kayamkulam are the nearby Cities to Poothankara.

This Place is in the border of the Pathanamthitta District and Alappuzha District. Alappuzha District Bharanicavu is west towards this place.

=== Nearby Air Ports ===
- Trivandrum International Airport 81 km near
- Kochi Airport 139 km near
- Tuticorin Airport 157 km near
- Madurai Airport 179 km near

=== Nearby Tourist Places ===
- Sasthamkotta 26 km near
- Thenmala 36 km near
- Varkala 45 km near
- Sabarimala 48 km near
- Ponmudi 57 km near

=== Maroor ===
Maroor is located 8 kilometres (5.0 mi) from Pathanapuram and 12 kilometres (7.5 mi) from Adoor by the Kayamkulam-Punalur Road. The Elamannur Panchayat Office, sub-registrar office and agriculture office are in Maroor.

== Administration ==
=== Electoral wards ===
Enadimangalam is split into the following electoral wards:

1. Bhoothankara
2. Chayalode
3. Elamannur
4. Kurumpakara
5. Kunnida
6. Maroor
7. Mangadu
8. Parackal
9. Salempuram.(Mallumkuzha(Moozhi)> Putuval:Ward-7)
