= Chayalode =

Chayalode, Pathanamthitta, Kerala, India
- Ward
- Location in Kerala, India
- Coordinates: 9°15′53″N 76°47′14″E
- Country: India
- State: Kerala
- District: Pathanamthitta
- Elevation: 31 m (102 ft)

Languages
  - Official: Malayalam, English
- Time zone: UTC+5:30 (IST)
- PIN: 691556
- Telephone code: 91-4734
- Vehicle registration: KL – 26
- Website: web.archive.org/web/20120214115335/http://www.pta.kerala.gov.in/intro.htm

Chayalode is a ward situated in the central Travancore region in the state of Kerala, India.

Chayalode has a hilly terrain, and it is covered by rubber estates. It has a variety of tropical flora and fauna. Chayalode is in Enadimangalam village, Pathanamthitta District, Kerala.

== Religion ==
The place has St. George Orthodox Church, part of Adoor-Kadampanad Diocese of the Malankara Orthodox Syrian Church. The Malankara Orthodox Syrian Church also runs an ashram there known as St. George Mount Ashram.

== Photos ==
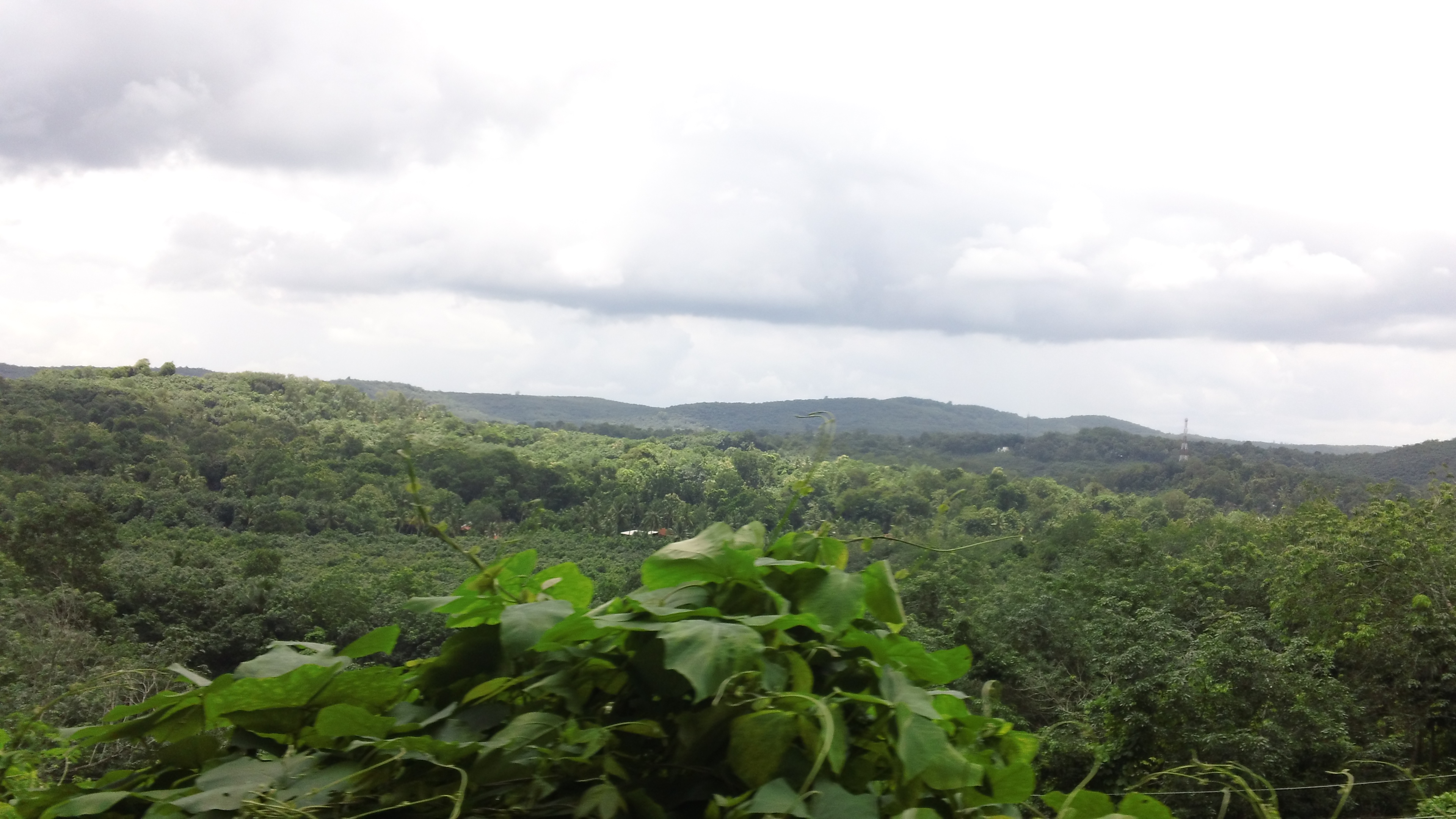
View of surrounding land

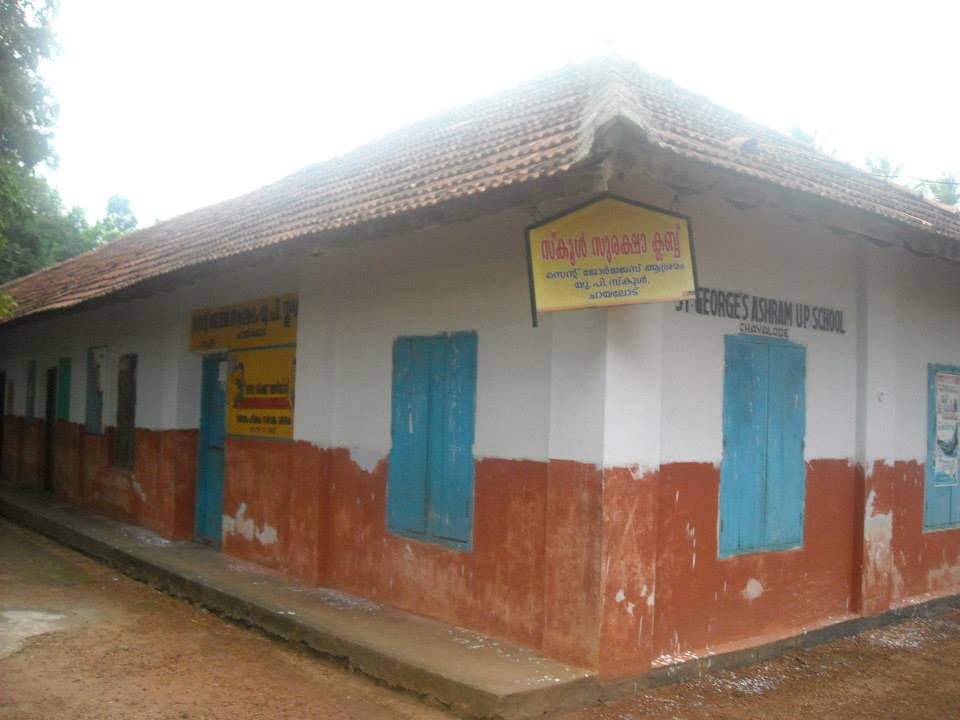
School founded in the 1950s

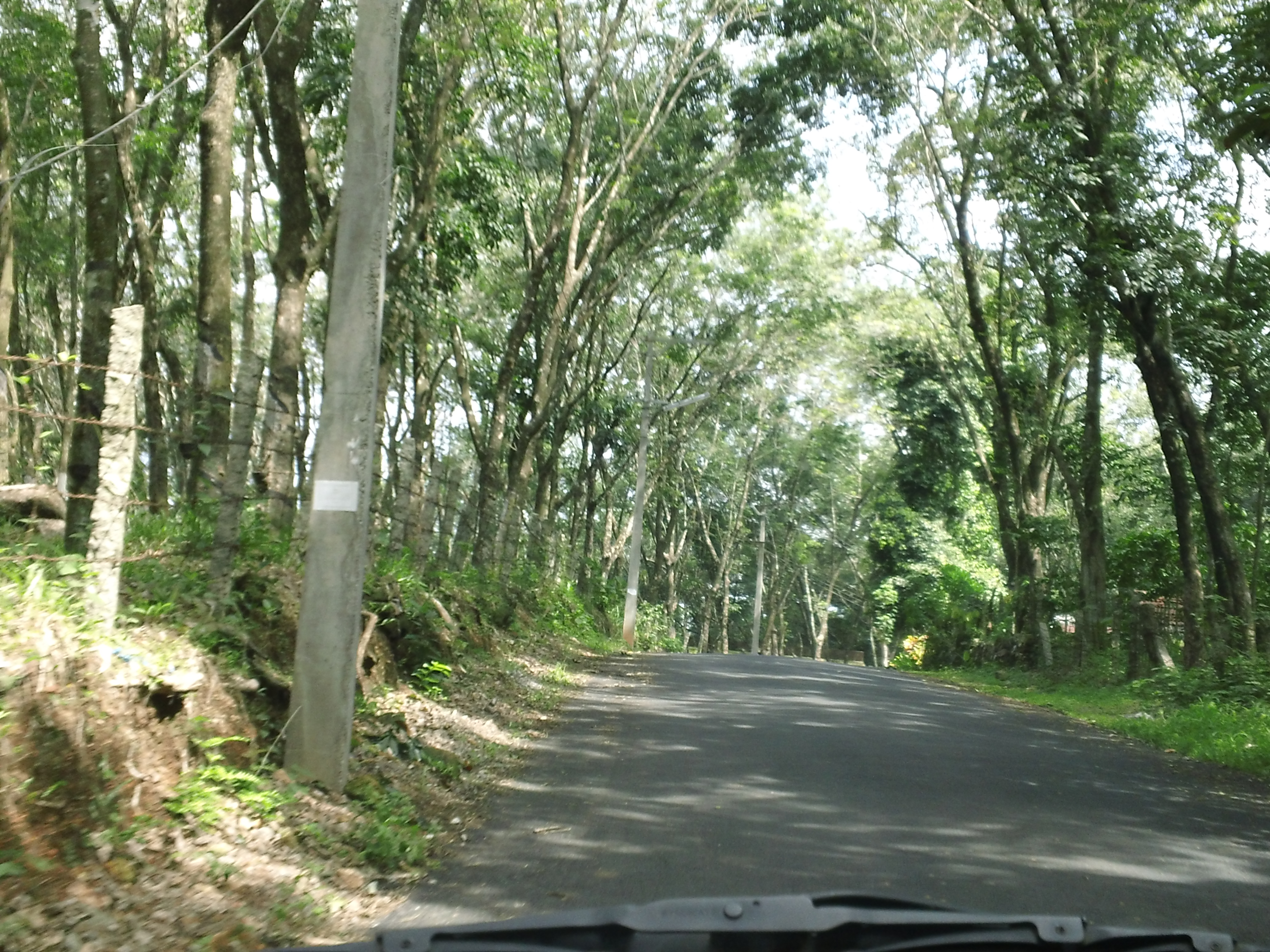
Road to and from Chayalode
