= Moonnalam =

Place in Kerala, India

- Urban
- Munnalam
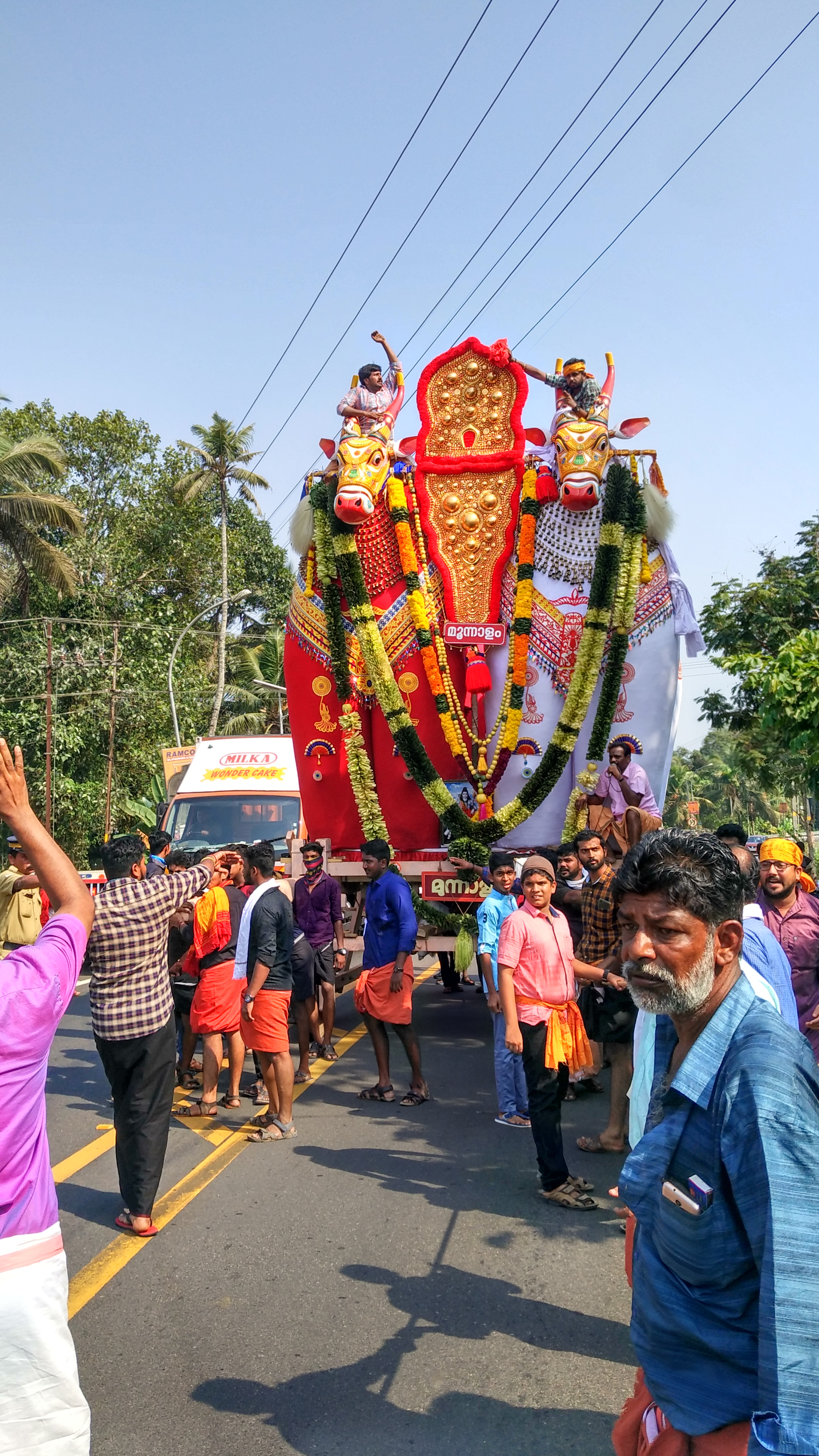
- Temple festival at Moonnalam

- Location in Kerala, India Moonnalam (India)
- Coordinates (Moonnalam Seedfarm Junction): 9.1470478°N 76.7236669°E
- Municipality: Adoor
- Established: 1981
- Councillor: Municipality

Government
  - Councillors: Anithadevi A (Ward 25) Sobha Thomas (Ward 26) (Ind.)

Languages
  - Official: Malayalam, English
- Time zone: IST
- PIN: 691523
- Telephone Code: 04734
- Vehicle registration: KL 26 (Adoor sub RTO)
- Loksabha Constituency: Pathanamthitta
- District: Pathanamthitta
- Legislative constituency: Adoor

Moonnalam (Munnalam); is an urban area located in the Adoor Town in Kerala, India.

Moonnalam comprises ward 25 and most of the area of ward 26 of the Adoor municipality. Adoor bypass passes through Moonnalam. The Kerala State Seed Farm of Adoor is located at Moonnalam.

Being a part of Adoor town, and not among the busy places, Moonnalam gives its contribution mostly in terms of agriculture, human settlement and providing a traffic-free way for the travellers on MC road and the way to Kollam. Although there are only few shops in Moonnalam, almost all of them are concentrated near Adoor bypass only. A large proportion of working natives are either NRI's or working outside Kerala.

== History ==
Moonnalam is a place located in Adoor, and was once part of Travancore Kingdom. Later after independence, when Travancore joined Indian Union, it became part of Travancore -Cochin state. Then again the state was reconstituted to form the present Kerala state. In the newly formed Kerala state, Adoor was in Kollam district. In 1982, due to the demands, a new district named Pathanamthitta was formed and Adoor was separated from Kollam district and incorporated to the newly forming Pathanamthitta district. Thereafter a new Adoor Thaluk and revenue division was formed and Adoor was made the headquarters Adoor Thaluk and Revenue Division. In 1990, Adoor Municipality was formed and Moonnalam became a part of it. The area under the Municipality was given the status of Town. Presently Moonnalam comprises the ward 25 (Munnalam) and ward 26 (Priyadarshini) of Adoor municipality.

The name Moonnalam came from the word 'Moonu Naal' meaning three days. The Parayeduppu festival of Thrichendamangalam Mahadevar Temple takes three days to complete, hence came the name.

== Demography and Politics ==
Majority of the people living at Moonnalam are Hindus, followed by Christians and Muslims.

Ward No	Name of Ward	Councilor	Party	Reservation
25	Munnalam	Anithadevi A	Independent	Woman
26	Priyadarshini	Sobha Thomas	Independent	General

Present MP of Pathanamthitta constituency is Shri Anto Antony and present MLA of Adoor is Shri Chittayam Gopakumar. Moonnalam comes under Adoor municipality currently governed by LDF.

== Geography ==
Moonnalam is a place with landscapes consisting of mainly slopes and plains. It has no nearby river and is mainly dependent on ground water sources. Main crops grown here are rubber, tapioca, rice, banana. Rubber was once the main income of people of Moonnalam. Valyathodu and Canal are the main irrigation sources for the agriculture. Moonnalam gets average to heavy rains every year. The main soils are sandy soil, earthen soil and gravel soil.

== Transportation ==
Roadways are the only means of transportation in Moonnalam. KSRTC bus station is less than 1 km away from Moonnalam, which provides 24 hrs interstate, interdistrict and local services. Adoor bypass passes through Moonnalam. Moonnalam-Manakkala road maintained by Kerala PWD, is another major road, which was modernised in 2019. It provides a shorter and traffic free way for the travellers to Kollam side.

Nearest railway stations are Kayankulam (25 km), Chengannur (26 km).

Trivandrum International Airport is the 93 km away from Moonnalam.

== Notable people ==
- Adoor Prakash - The former Revenue minister and present MP of Attingal has his family roots in Moonnalam

== Important places and Landmarks ==
=== Moonnalam Haindavasamithi ===
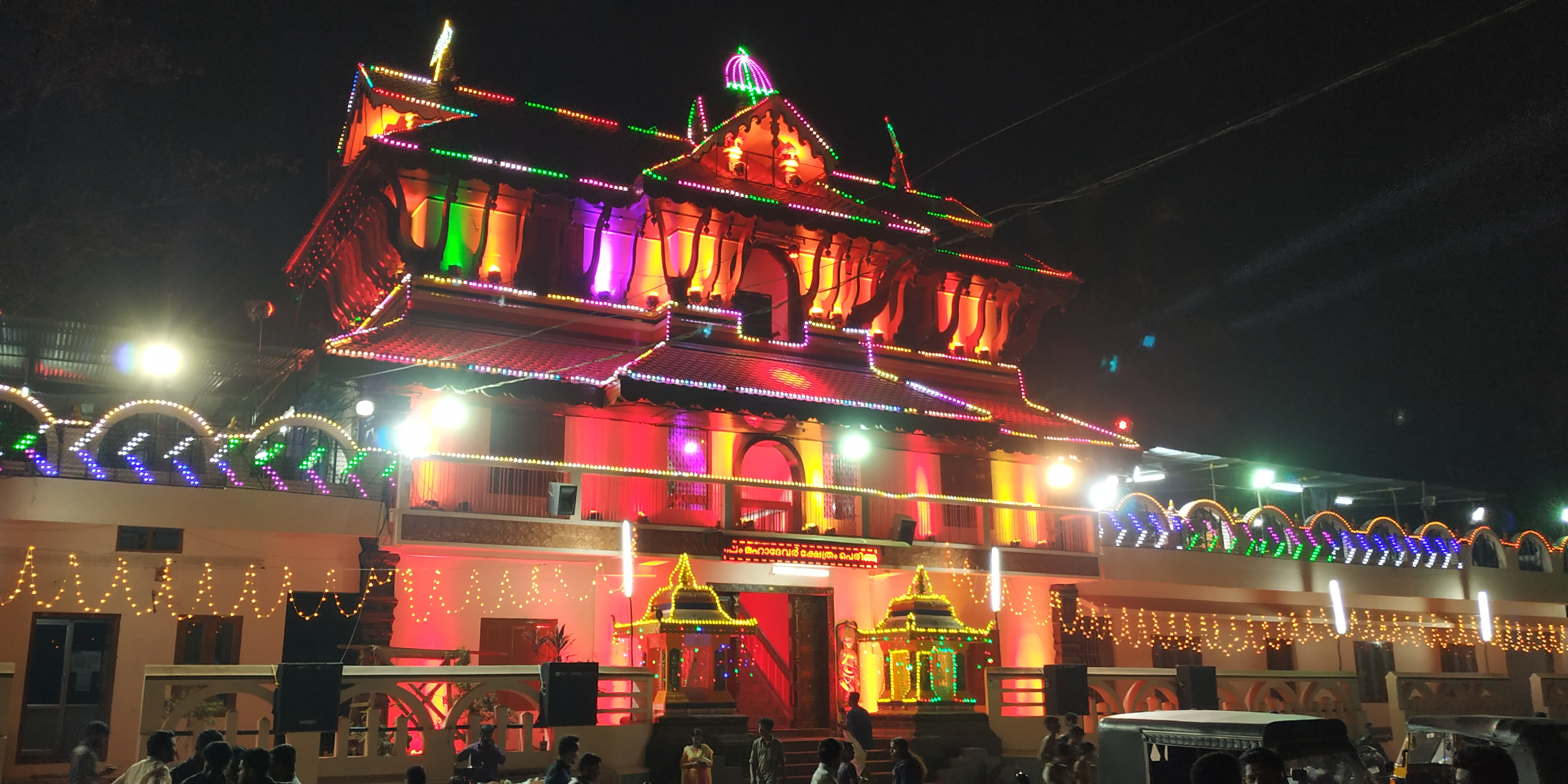
Thrichendagamagalam Mahadevar Temple, Peringanadu

Trichendamangalam Mahadevar (Lord Shiva) is the main Hindu deity worshipped by most of the people in Moonnalam. Moonnalam is one among the ten Permanent members of Thrichendamangalam Mahadevar Temple. Initially the Kettukazcha was being hired from outside for the festival uses. In early 1980s E. N Balakrishnan along with some natives took initiatives in building a new Kettukazcha for Moonnalam. In the early 2000s, a Haindavasamithi building was constructed and the materials of the Kettukazcha were kept there and worshipped. Later in the 2010s the old materials of the Kettukazcha were replaced by the new ones. Now Moonnalam owns a Kettukazcha which is made every year for the temple festival. Every year in the months of February- March, the temple has a festival lasting for 10 days. The name Moonnalam originated from the word 'Moonu Naal' meaning three days as the Parayeduppu festival of the Temple takes 3 days to complete. Moonnalam Haindavasamithi is located near Moonnalam Seedfarm Junction.

=== Moonnalam LP School ===
Moonnalam LPS was started in the year 1946. It is a primary only school. The school is managed by Dept. Of Education. In 2018, Prasanthchandran Pillai, the councilor or ward 25, took initiatives to raise the school into better standards.

=== State Seedfarm, Moonnalam ===
Moonnalam has great area of lands used for agriculture. The State Seedfarm at Moonnalam was established in 1960 and an area of 25 acres comes under it. It deals with the scientific production, storage and distribution of saplings. The soil here is sandy, clay, loam and strongly acidic in nature. The necessary water for irrigation is met by water from Adoor valyathodu and canal irrigation system. In the 2000s a huge well was dug to meet the increasing water needs. Under Kerala government, the State Seedfarm here deals with cultivation and storage of crops, mainly rice, banana, vegetables, coconut and tapioca. The rice fields have significant contribution in Moonnalam's greenery. Some of these fields were used for shooting movie scenes in old Malayalam films. Modern agricultural techniques are adopted to increase the agricultural production. Both manpower and modern equipment are unified and scientifically utilized here. The adjoining small cow farm provides the necessary dung for farming. The Kerala government's vision to attain self-sufficiency in agriculture and food has encouraged people. Initiatives have been taken to utilise more and more barren lands for agricultural purposes. During the 2020 Covid lockdown, an increased demand for saplings were noted and saplings of various crops were distributed to promote agriculture in the area. The seedfarm encourages terrace farming and self and individual farming among the natives. Necessary advices are given by the authorities to improve agricultural practices.

A weather observatory was placed here by ISRO years back for assessing rain, temperature and wind, which appears to be nonfunctional since last 10 years. The observatory was responsible for providing adequate weather information for crop cultivation.

=== Marthashamooni Orthodox Church, Moonnalam ===
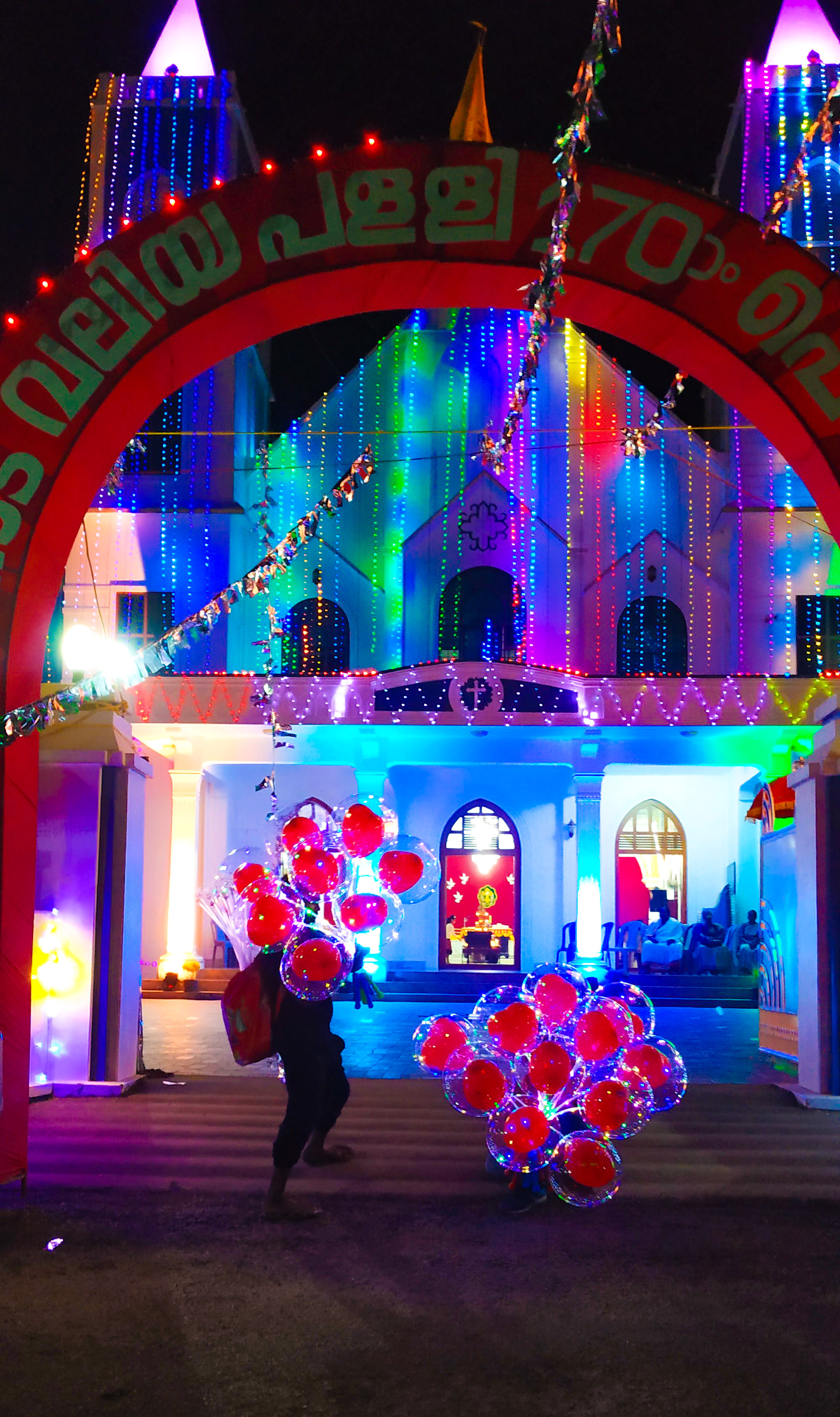
Marthashamooni Orthodox Church, Moonnalam

Marthashamooni Church also known as 'Poovankunnil pally' is a Christian Orthodox Church located in Moonnalam. It is the first church in India proclaimed under the name of St.Shmooni. People from far places of all religions visit this church. It is one of the most established churches in Kerala and was proclaimed as a global pilgrimage center. The church is known for its celebration of 'Veliya Perunnal' which takes place every year in the month of January. Most of the members of the church are NRI's.

=== Moonnalam Junction Playground ===
Although a small playground, this ground has deep relations with sporting abilities of the children and youths of Moonnalam. The ground has been used for years for playing cricket, football, badminton, and volleyball. It is also used to conduct Onam celebrations and Parayeduppu festival. Soorya Arts and Sports club, Yuvabharat Moonnalam clubs are the main clubs of Moonnalam.

=== Moonnalam SNDP ===
4750 Moonnalam SNDP branch is one among the SNDP branch under Adoor SNDP Union. It was established in the early 2000s, before that it was in Karuvatta SNDP branch. It has a separate building and yearly functions of Sreenaryanaguru Jayanthi and Samadhi are held.

=== Moonnalam Health subcentre ===
Located near SNDP branch building.
