= Sreenarayanapuram Temple =

Sreenarayanapuram Mahavishnu Temple
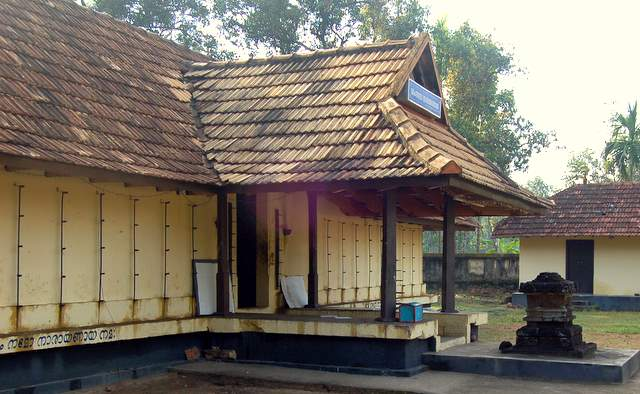
- Sreenarayanapuram temple

- Sreenarayanapuram Temple, Manakala, Pathanamthitta, Kerala

Religion
- Affiliation: Hinduism
- District: Pathanamthitta
- Deity: Vishnu
- Festival: Dasavatarachartu

Location
- Location: Manakala, Adoor
- State: Kerala
- Country: India
- Interactive map of Sreenarayanapuram Mahavishnu Temple
- Coordinates: 8°44′33.5″N 76°46′09.2″E

Architecture
- Type: Architecture of Kerala
- Completed: 18th century

Specifications
- Temple: One
- Elevation: 56.64 m (186 ft)

Sreenarayanapuram Mahavishnu Temple is an ancient Vishnu temple in Kerala, India. It is at Manakala (in Pathanamthitta) about 4 km (2.5 mi) from Adoor.

== Location ==
This temple is located at an altitude of about 56.64 m above the mean sea level with the geographic coordinates of (8°44′33.5″N 76°46′09.2″E) in Manakala.

== Festivals ==
Sreenarayanapuram Temple is known for the annual Dasavatarachartu festival. Dasavatarachartu is a ten-day celebration; each day one Avatar of Mahavishnu from Dasavatara is worshiped. Sreenarayanapuram is one of the few Vishnu temples in Kerala where a Dasavatarachartu festival is conducted.

== See also ==
- List of Hindu temples in Kerala
- Temples of Kerala
- Manakala
- Dasavatara
