= Parakode =

- Village
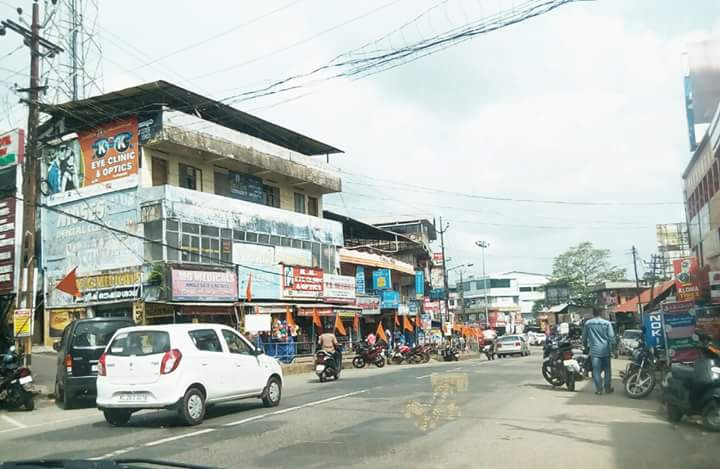
- Adoor-Parakode road

- Location within Kerala
- Coordinates: 9.20°N 76.76°E
- Country: India
- State: Kerala
- District: Pathanamthitta

Languages
  - Official: Malayalam
- Time zone: UTC+5:30 (IST)
- Nearest city: Pathanapuram Adoor Kottarakara
- Lok Sabha constituency: Pathanamthitta
- Assembly constituency: Adoor
- Literacy: 93.63%

Parakode is one of the main junction situated in the outskirts of Adoor Municipality Pathanamthitta District, Kerala state, India. It comes under Adoor Taluk

== Politics ==
Parakode is a part of Pathanamthitta district Panchayat. It comes under Adoor assembly constituency in Pathanamthitta (Lok Sabha constituency). Shri. Chittayam Gopakumar is the current MLA of Adoor. Shri. Anto Antony is the current member of parliament of Pathanamthitta.

== Geography ==
The main part of Parakode is a junction in Kayamkulam-Punalur road. It connects places Pathanapuram, Punalur, etc. to Adoor.

== See also ==
- Ammakandakara, a village in Parakode.
- Arukalickal
- Ezhamkulam
- Pathanamthitta
