= E. V. Krishna Pillai =

Indian writer (1894–1938)

- Born: 14 September 1894; Kunnathur, Quilon, Travancore, British India
- Died: 30 March 1938 (aged 43); Trivandrum, Travancore, British India
- Occupations: Writer; Humourist; Satirist
- Spouse: Maheswari Amma
- Children: 7, including Adoor Bhasi
- Parents: Pappu Pillai; Karthyayani Amma
- Relatives: C. V. Raman Pillai (father-in-law)

E. V. Krishna Pillai (14 September 1894 – 30 March 1938) was an Indian writer of Malayalam literature and member of Sree Moolam Popular Assembly of Travancore. He was known to be a multi-talented personality and excelled as an advocate, Member of Legislative Assembly, editor and writer. During his short life, he wrote comedies, dramas, short stories and an autobiography. He was also a columnist and caricaturist. He was an eminent satirist and a genius in comedy.

== Biography ==
E. V. Krishna Pillai was born on 14 September 1894 at Kunnathur Taluk of Quilon to Pappu Pillai and Kalyani Amma.

After completing his schooling at Kunnathur, Krishna Pillai went on to graduate in Arts and Law and started his career as a government servant. He married Maheswari Amma, the youngest daughter of writer, C. V. Raman Pillai. The couple had five sons and two daughters. Chandraji (Ramachandran Nair), the eldest, was a film actor. The second son, Adoor Bhasi (Bhaskaran Nair), was also a film actor. The third, Padmanabhan Nair (Padman), was a journalist and the writer of the cartoon Kunchu Kurup. His other children were Omana Amma, Rajalakshmi Amma, Sankaran Nair (who died at the young age of 18 due to heart disease) and Krishnan Nair.

Later, he took up the positions as Editor of publications such as Malayali and Malayala Manorama. Pillai during this period, shifted his residence to Peringanad, near Adoor in erstwhile Travancore state. He also served as a member of the Sree Moolam Popular Assembly of Travancore.

Krishna Pillai died on 30 March 1938 at the young age of 43.

The E. V. Krishna Pillai Smaraka Sahitya Award has been instituted in his honour by Piravi Samskarika Samithi.

== Works ==
=== Hasya Krithikal (comedy) ===
1	M L C Kadhakal	
2	Kavitha Case	
3	Police Ramayanam	
4	E. V. Kadhakal	
5	Chiriyum Chinthayum	1935
6	Rasikan Thoolikachithrangal	

=== Naatakangalum Prahasanangalum (coma and farce) ===
1	Seethalekshmi	1932
2	Raja Kesavadasan	1928
3	Iravikuttypilla	1933
4	Raamaraajaabhishekam	1932
5	Kurupinte daily	
6	Pennarasu naadu	
7	Vivaha Kammattam	
8	B. A. Mayavi	
9	Pranaya commission	
10	Kallapramanam	
11	Thilothama	
12	Vismrithi	
13	MaayaMaanushan	

=== Aathmakadha (autobiography) ===
1	Jeevitha smaranakal (2 bhaagangal)

=== Cherukadha (short story) ===
1	Kelee Soudhum (4 bhaagangal)

  2 ente gandharvasnehithan

=== Novel ===
1	Baashpa varsham
2	Aarude Kai
3	Thoratha Kanneer

=== Prabandha Samahaaram (collection of essays) ===
1	Akkaalangal
2	Congress Chithrangal
3	Nehru Geetha

=== Baala Saahithyam (children's literature) ===
1	Guru Samaksham
2	Bhaaskaran
3	Baala Leela
4	Guna PaaTangaL
5	Shubha Charya
6	Sukha Jeevitham

E. V also co-authored books like Veeramahathwam with A. Sankara Pillai, Gaandhi Kaalam Onapaattu with C. V. KunjuRaaman.
