= Arukalickal =

- Village: India
- State: Kerala
- District: Pathanamthitta
- Time zone: IST (UTC+5:30)
- PIN: 691554

Arukalickal is a small Village/hamlet in Parakode block in Pathanamthitta District of Kerala State, India. It comes under Ezhamkulam Panchayath. It belongs to South Kerala Division. It is located 15 km south of the district headquarters Pathanamthitta, 1 km from Parakode, and 89 km from the state capital Thiruvananthapuram.

This place is in the border of the Pathanamthitta District and Alappuzha District. Alappuzha District Bharanicavu is west towards this place. Pathanamthitta, Punalur, Mavelikkara, Chengannur are nearby cities to Arukalickal.
