= Bull surfing =

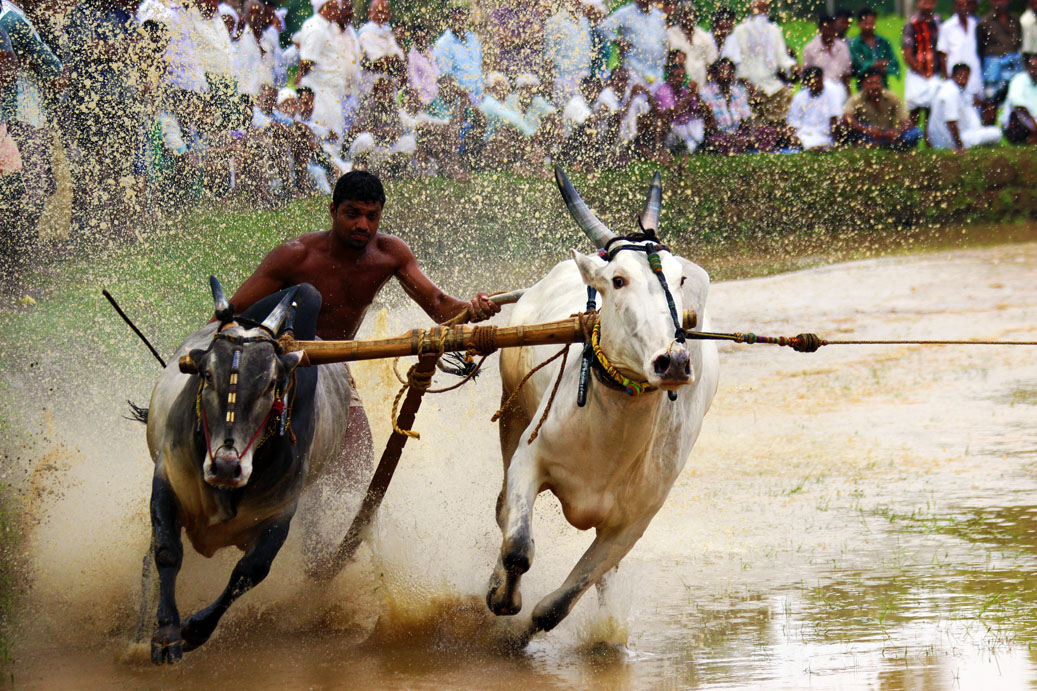
Bull Surfing at Kerala, 2013

Bull surfing is a harvest sport race that take place in the village of Anandapally, southern Kerala during the post harvest season. A pair of yoked bulls are sent charging down a football field-sized paddy field soaked in ankle deep water, while their handlers boarded on a wooden plank, hang onto the tail or onto a harness and slide through the mud. The fields are freshly ploughed as the bulls are raced by their handlers.

Bull surfing competitions are common in Kerala where local clubs or landlords offer trophies and cash prizes for races with different categories for speed and style. A pair of oxen is usually managed by a participating unit formed by a handler (the surfing member) and a team of people to assist him. Usually 30 to 50 of these units participate in the race that goes on from morning until dusk. Just like the professional jockeys, these participants are well trained and are experts in managing the oxen during the race. The oxen are specifically fed and trained just for the competition. They are also well groomed and horn polished, so they look their best before jumping in the mud. Most participants begin by holding onto the rope attached to the bulls, and move to hang onto the tail when their surfing begins. The races are performed by one team at a time and there will be several rounds to determine which team took the least time to complete one lap within the field. The villagers gather around these fields while keeping a safe distance and chanting and cheering in excitement.
