= Vallabhankunnu =

- Location within Kerala Location within India

Highest point
- Elevation: 125 m (410 ft)
- Coordinates: 8.8553726°N 76.8165521°E

Naming
- Language of name: Malayalam

Geography
- Location: Pallikkal, Varkala, Thiruvananthapuram district, Kerala, India
- Parent range: Western Ghats

Climbing
- Easiest route: Hike

Vallabhankunnu is a hill top in Pallikkal panchayat of Varkala Taluk in Thiruvananthapuram District of Kerala. It is situated 22 km east of Varkala and 17 km north of Kilimanoor.
