= Pallickal Nooranadu =

Pallickal Nooranadu Pallickal Nooranadu
- village
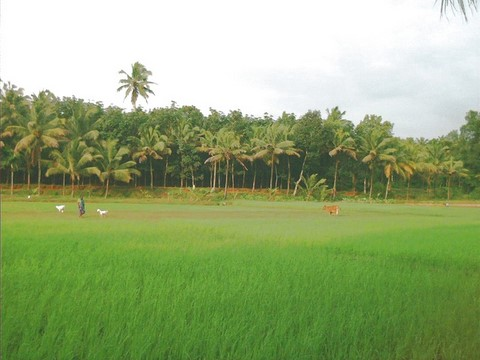
- Interactive map of Pallickal Nooranadu
- Coordinates: 9.1473503°N 76.6461182°E
- Country: India
- State: Kerala
- District: Pathanamthitta

Pallickal Nooranadu is a village in Kerala, India. Its ancient name was "Kallappanchira". Pallickal is in Pathanamthitta district.
