= Ezhamkulam =

- village
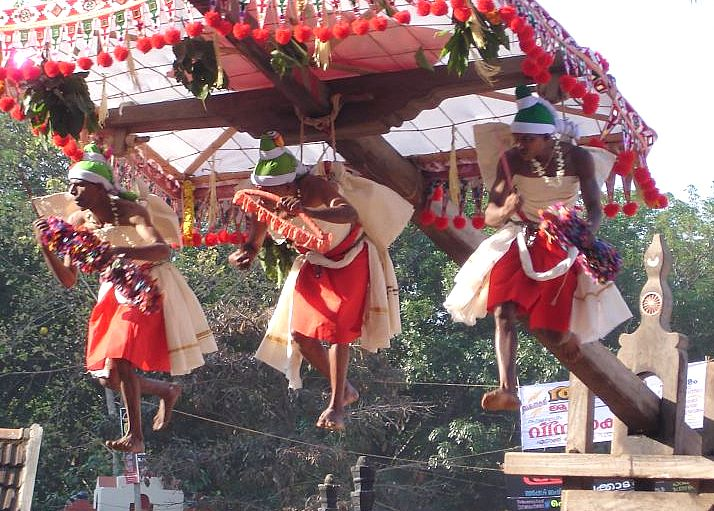
- Thookkam at Ezhamkulam temple
- Interactive map of Ezhamkulam
- Coordinates: 9°8′0″N 76°46′0″E
- Country: India
- State: Kerala
- District: Pathanamthitta
- Founder: Havish S Pillai

Population (2011)
  - Total: 18,655

Languages
  - Official: Malayalam, English
- Time zone: UTC+5:30 (IST)
- PIN: 691543
- Vehicle registration: KL-26(Adoor sub RTO)
- Thaluk, Subdivision and Revenue division: Adoor
- Lok Sabha constituency: Pathanamthitta
- Climate: Monsoon (Köppen)

Ezhamkulam is a village in Adoor Thaluk of Pathanamthitta district in the state of Kerala, India. It is located about 5 km from central Adoor.

== Culture ==
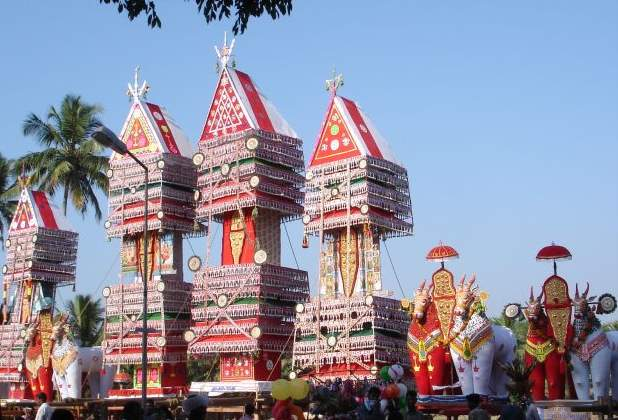
Ezhamkettu festival

Ezhamkulam is known for the ancient Ezhamkulam Devi Temple. It is famous for Garudan Thookkam, vazhipadu thookkam and Kettukazhcha that take place as a part of the annual Kumbha Bharani festival.Other cultural hubs include Crystal glass house and Crystal home.

== Demographics ==
At the 2011 India census, Ezhamkulam had a population of 18,655 with 8,728 males and 9,927 females.

== See also ==
- Pathanamthitta
- Adoor
- Parakode
- Temples of Kerala
