= Anandapally =

Village in Pathanamthitta District, Kerala, India

Anandapally is a place in Kerala. The nearest railway station Chengannur, about 25 km from Adoor. The nearest airport Thiruvananthapuram International Airport, about 92 km from Adoor. It lies on a road from the northern part of Kerala to the Hindu pilgrimage centre - Sabarimala.

== Religion ==
Anadapally is Majority Christian, though contains religious minorities. There are five Christian churches within 2 km distance and the Anandappally St. Kuriakose Orthodox Valiyapally is the oldest one, which is situated in the Anandappally junction itself.

== Economy ==
like its neighbouring Panchayats, one of Anadapally's main industries is rubber farming. There is also a large inflow of foreign currency due to the sizeable number of Anadapally natives working in Gulf countries.

== Maramady Festival ==
Anandappally Maramady is a cultural festival of Kerala, which revolves around agriculture.

Bull surfing is a harvest sport that takes place in Anandapally during the post-harvest season.
