= College of Engineering, Adoor =

College in Adoor, Kerala, India

Government College of Engineering Adoor (CEA)
- കോളേജ് ഓഫ് എഞ്ചിനീയറിംഗ് അടൂർ (സി.ഇ.എ)
- Type: Public; Aided by the World Bank under TEQIP Programme Govt. of India
- Established: 1995
- Affiliations: KTU
- Principal: Dr Nisha Kuruvilla
- Faculty: 150
- Students: 1584
- Location: Manakala, Adoor, Kerala; 9.1324°N 76.7182°E
- Website: http://www.cea.ac.in/
- Location within Kerala Location within India

The College of Engineering, Adoor commonly known as CEA is a Government Cost-Sharing Engineering College in Adoor, Pathanamthitta District, Kerala, India, located 3 km from the town centre at Manakala. It is affiliated with the APJ Abdul Kalam Technological University and is run under the aegis of the Institute of Human Resources Development, an institute of the government of Kerala. The college was inaugurated in 1995 by the Chief Minister of Kerala A K Antony. College of Engineering Adoor is recognized by the All India Council for Technical Education (AICTE). Recently the college has been selected in Technical Education Quality Improvement Programme (TEQIP) Phase II. It is the Best Engineering College in Pathanamthitta District and is one of the topmost major Engineering colleges in the Kerala. It is recognised by AICTE and also it is accredited by NBA. Recently the college has been included in list of Kerala Institute of Ranking Framework (KIRF) by the Government of Kerala.

== Courses ==
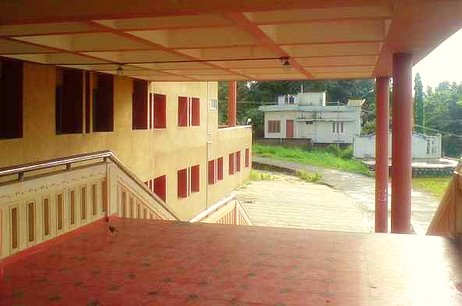
Corridor

The college offers BTech (Bachelor of Technology) and newly MTech (Master of Technology) degrees in five streams. 10% of the total seats are given to lateral entry students in every discipline. The number of seats per year is given in brackets.

- Computer Science Engineering (120+6)
- Electrical and Electronics Engineering (60+6)
- Electronics and Communication Engineering (60+6)
- Mechanical Engineering (60+6)
- Computer Science Engineering (Data Science) (60+6)
- Bachelor of Business Administration (60)

The college also offers MTech (Master of Technology) in the following stream(s).

- Mechanical Engineering with specialization in Thermal Engineering (18)

== Admission ==
Admissions are carried out on the basis of the ranks obtained in the All Kerala Common Entrance Examinations, conducted by the Controller of Entrance Examinations, Government of Kerala. The college follows a 50-50 method of admission from both merit and management streams. A significant number of students in the management stream is filled by children of NRIs.

When the college started in 1995, it had a 90-10 breakup of merit and management streams. However, the merit students were required to pay a refundable deposit (at the end of the course) of ₹ 1,00,000 which was utilized for infrastructure development in the college.

== College Senate ==
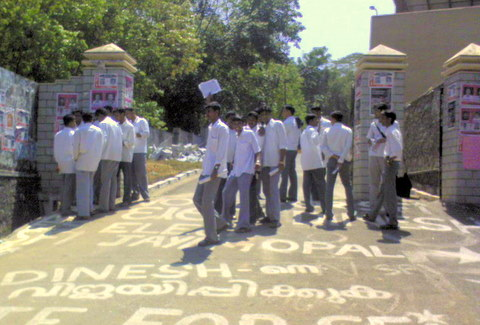
College Senate election campaign

The members of the College Senate (College Union) are elected by and from the students of the college. The College Senate consists of elected representatives from each class and lady representatives from each year. The College Senate has an executive committee consisting of Chairman, Vice-Chairman, General Secretary, Treasurer, Editor, Sports Club Secretary and Arts Club Secretary. The tenure of office of the College Senate is one academic year.

== Department associations ==
=== FORUM ===
FORUM (Fraternity of Royal United Mechanicals) is an association of the Mechanical Engineering students of CEA. They have organized many academic programs and In 2008 FORUM conducted PRAGNJA, an inter-college technical fest and exhibition.

=== PULSE ===
PULSE (Powerful and United Legion of Students of Electronics), is the Electronics and Communication Engineering students' association. They have organized induction program for freshers, introductory and expert seminars in recent technologies.

=== TRACE ===
TRACE (The Regal Association of Computer Engineers) is the association of Computer Science & Engineering students. Each year TRACE conducts a festival. TRACE introduced CEA to Linux by establishing the CEA-LUG (Linux Users Group).

=== EESA ===
EESA (Electrical Engineering Student Association) is an association of electrical and electronics engineering students of CEA. EESA organizes social events, host talks by guest speakers and students, and helps communicate with the department and the students.

== Clubs ==
Following clubs are present in college:

- Music Club
- Arts Club
- Sports Club
- Quiz Club
- Nature Club
- Drishti - Photography Club
- Dance Club

== Technical and non-technical organizations ==
=== SAE ===
SAEINDIA is a resource for mobility technology. As an individual member-driven society of mobility practitioners the ownership of SAEINDIA rests with its members who are individuals from the mobility community, which includes engineers, executives from industry, government officials, academics and students.

SAEINDIA is an affiliate society of SAE International registered in India as an Indian non-profit engineering and scientific society dedicated to the advancement of mobility industry in India.

Under SAEINDIA-CEA, CEA MOTORSPORTS was established and consist of mainly three teams: Team DRUTHA, Team ASTRA and Team AAGNEYA.

=== TEAM Drutha ===
Team Drutha was initially formed in 2010 by a group of B.Tech students of College of Engineering Adoor, a government engineering college run by the IHRD. Its aims to compete in the SUPRA SAE.

==== Awards & Achievements ====
- Successfully passing the Virtual SUPRA SAEINDIA 2011, 2012
- Race a car in Buddh International Circuit, Noida, Delhi 2013
- Participated in SUPRA SAEINDIA 2016, at Buddh International Circuit, Noida, Delhi
- Participated and qualified for Endurance Race of SUPRA SAEINDIA 2017 at Buddh International Circuit, Noida, Delhi
- Secured 4th positionin overall rankings at FFS India 2017, held at Kari Motor Speedway, Coimbatore
- Secured 2nd positionin Skid-pad Event of FFS India 2017, held at Kari Motor Speedway, Coimbatore

=== TEAM Astra ===
Team Astra was initially formed in 2016.Team Astra is a student-run design & manufacturing team of College of Engineering Adoor, that participate in various ATV competitions conducted across INDIA.

=== TEAM Aagneya ===
Team Aagneya, the official Go-Kart team of CEA was initially formed in 2017 by a group of B.Tech students of College of Engineering Adoor, a government engineering college run by the IHRD. This team aims to compete in FMAE FKDC, and GKDC.

=== ASME ===
The American Society of Mechanical Engineers (ASME) is a professional association that, in its own words, "promotes the art, science, and practice of multidisciplinary engineering and allied sciences around the globe" via "continuing education, training and professional development, codes and standards, research, conferences and publications, government relations, and other forms of outreach."

=== ISTE ===
International Society for Technology in Education (ISTE) is a nonprofit professional organization with a worldwide membership of leaders and potential leaders in educational technology. The ISTE student chapter at CEA organizes seminars, industrial visits, competitions, workshops and discussions. In 2002 ISTE student chapter at CEA won the best student chapter award in Kerala.

=== IEEE ===
The Institute of Electrical and Electronics Engineers or IEEE is an international professional organization for the advancement of technology related to electricity.The IEEE Student Branch (SB) of the College of Engineering Adoor, established on February 29, 2000, is one of the oldest student chapters in IEEE Region 10 and the first in Pathanamthitta District.

=== NSS ===
National Service Scheme (NSS) aims to integrate learning with social service. The students conduct activities such as blood donation, nature camp, and campus beautification.

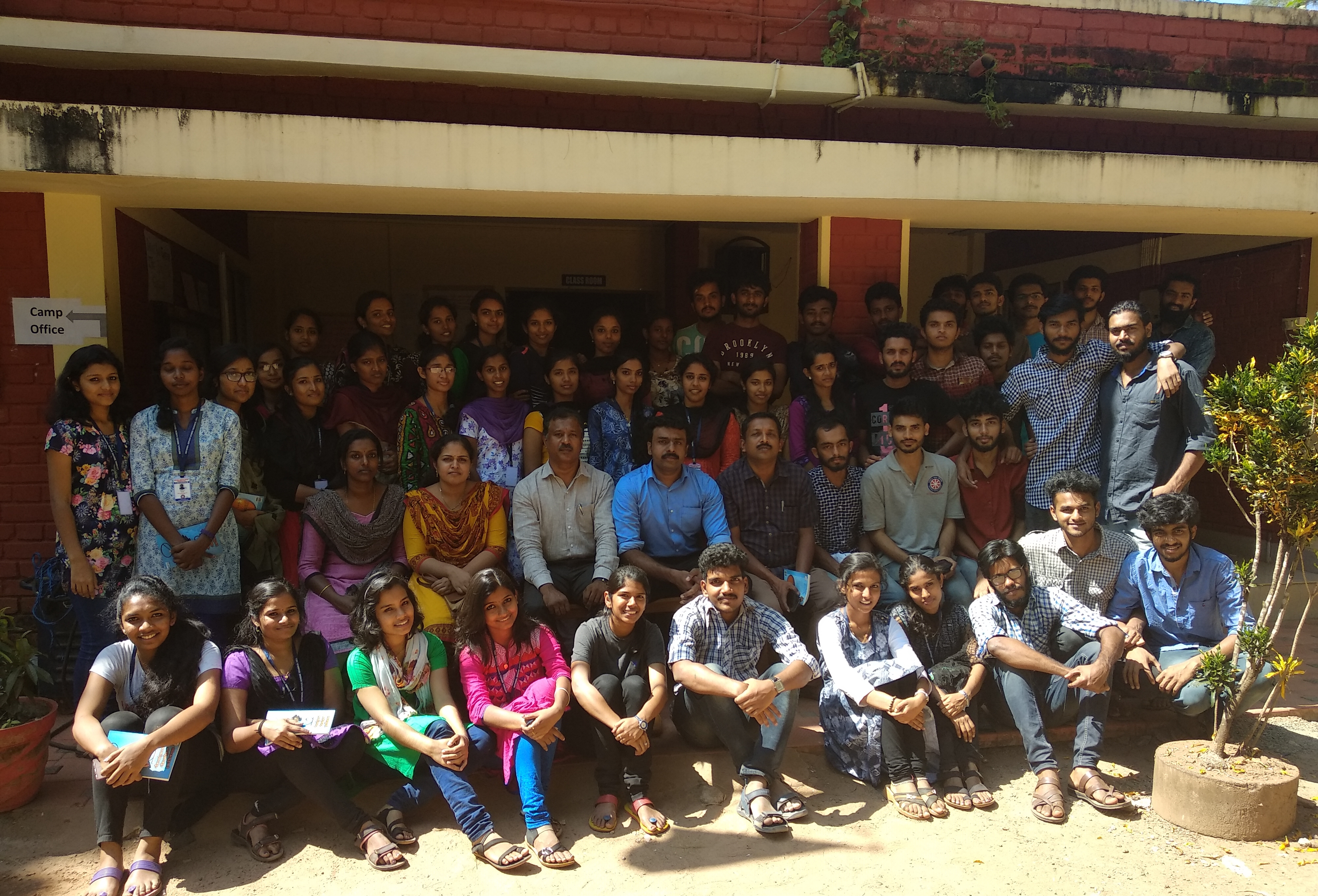

== Placement cell ==
The placement cell functioning in the campus dedicates itself to help students establish their career. Companies are invited to the college to recruit final-year students. Students have received placements in MNCs like Infosys, HCL, Syntel, Larsen & Toubro, UST Global, CTS, Mindtree, Oracle, Tata Elxsi and Wipro, Amazon, Federal Bankthrough the placement cell.

== Arts and sports ==
The arts and sports festivals conducted every year by the college senate. The College Senate divides students into four houses, each having a captain and a vice captain. Arts and Sports festivals are conducted in even semesters.

== Notable alumni ==
- Dr Nikhil Paul : Chief technology and information officer (CTIO) at 6D Technologies
- Sarath Chandran : Managing director and head of India R&D for Armada
- Simjees Abraham : Global head of automation and digitalization at DB Schenker
- Anjusha Sandeep : Principal architect at Google Maps Platform
- Asish T Karunakaran : Chief technology officer (CTO) of National Bank for Financing Infrastructure and Development (NaBFID)
- Dr John Jose : Associate professor at IIT Guwahati
- Sreejith PR: Regional provident fund commissioner at EPFO
- Shihab Muhammed : Founder and CEO at SurveySparrow
- Arun Raj Rajendradas : CEO at OrysisIndia
- Bijo Paulose John : Co-founder and COO at Mitsogo
- Abhilash Suresh : Co-founder at White Rabbit Group
- Shiyas Shahabudeen : Chief strategy officer at Gadgeon Systems
- Jazna Rafeek : Chief operating officer (COO) of PIT Solutions
- Mable Thomas: Actress, writer, producer known for her roles in major films like L2: Empuraan, Dhoomam (2023 film)

== Technical events ==
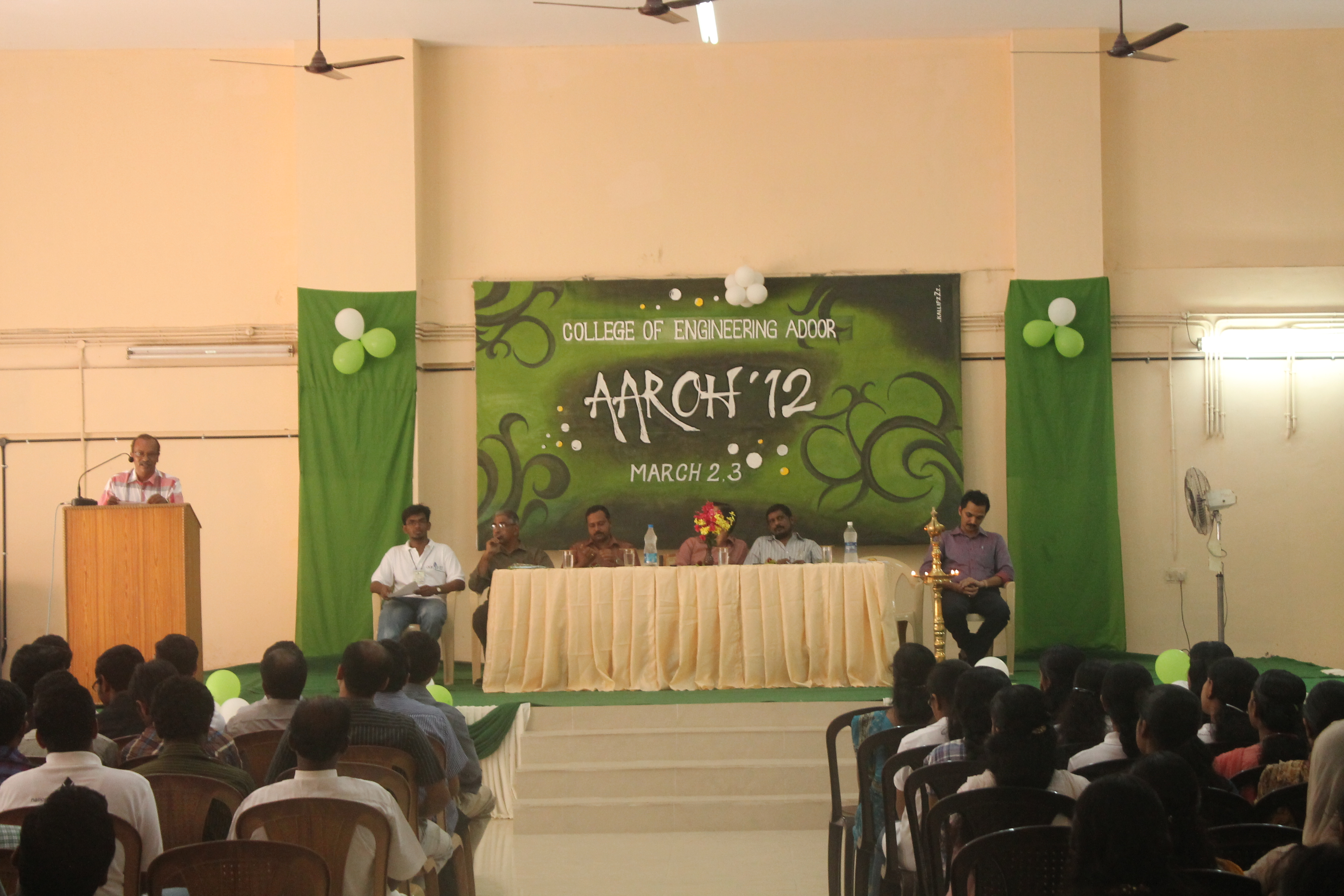
Aaroh 2012

=== AAROH ===
Aaroh is the annual national-level technical extravaganza of College of Engineering, Adoor. Driven by the motto "Rise High, Rise Bright", Aaroh aims at providing a platform for students to explore and showcase their technical skills against the best in the nation. Aaroh offers events including exhibition, seminars and workshops.

== Location ==
CEA is located at Manakkala, 2.5 km away from the main Adoor Municipality on the sidelines of Adoor-Karunagappally road. More than 50 buses ply along this route, providing easy access. The nearest railway stations are Karunagappally, Kayamkulam and Chengannur. The M.C. Road links it to Thiruvananthapuram International Airport and Kochi Airport.

== Gallery ==
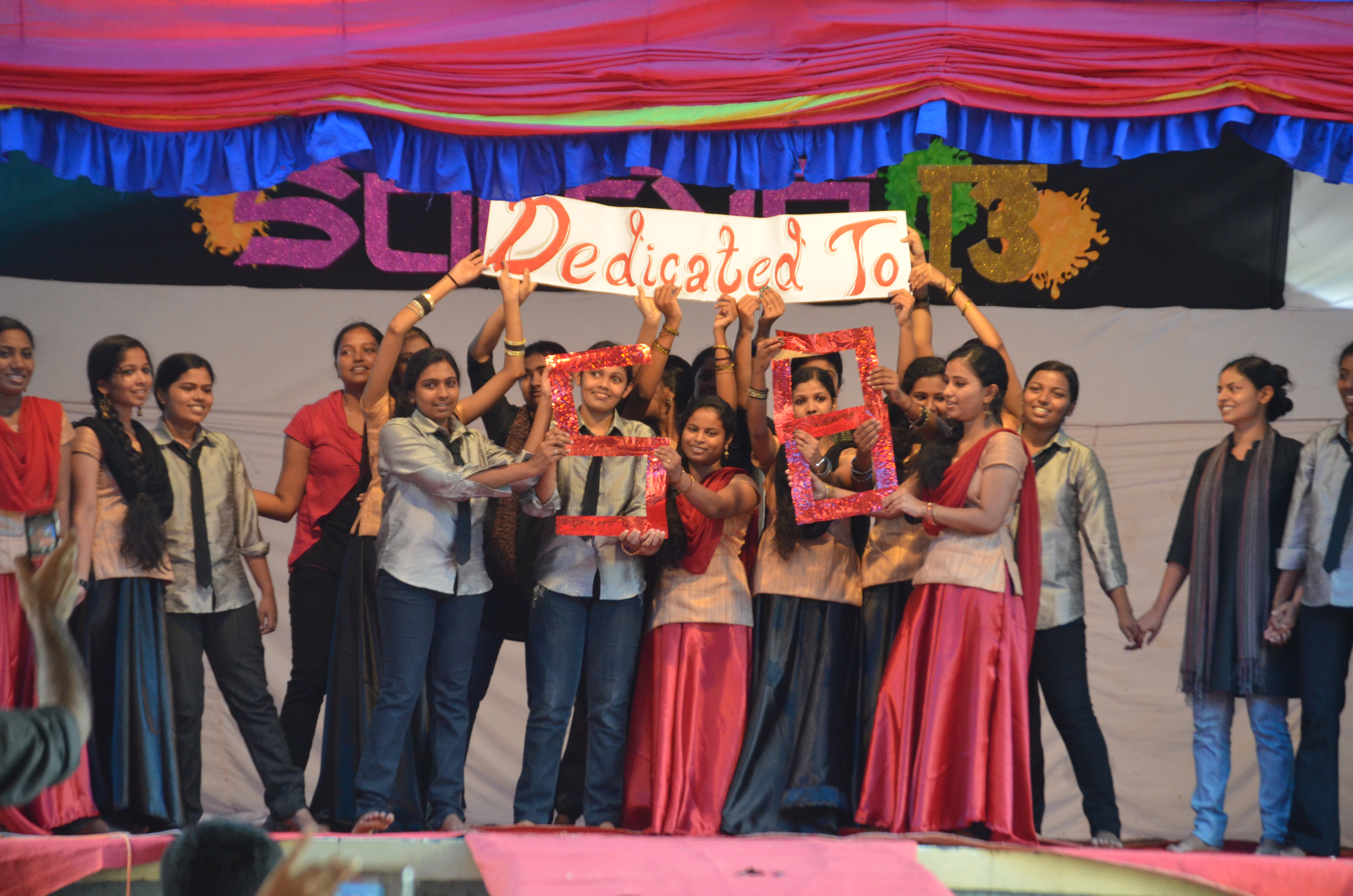
Sattva'13 Arts Fest

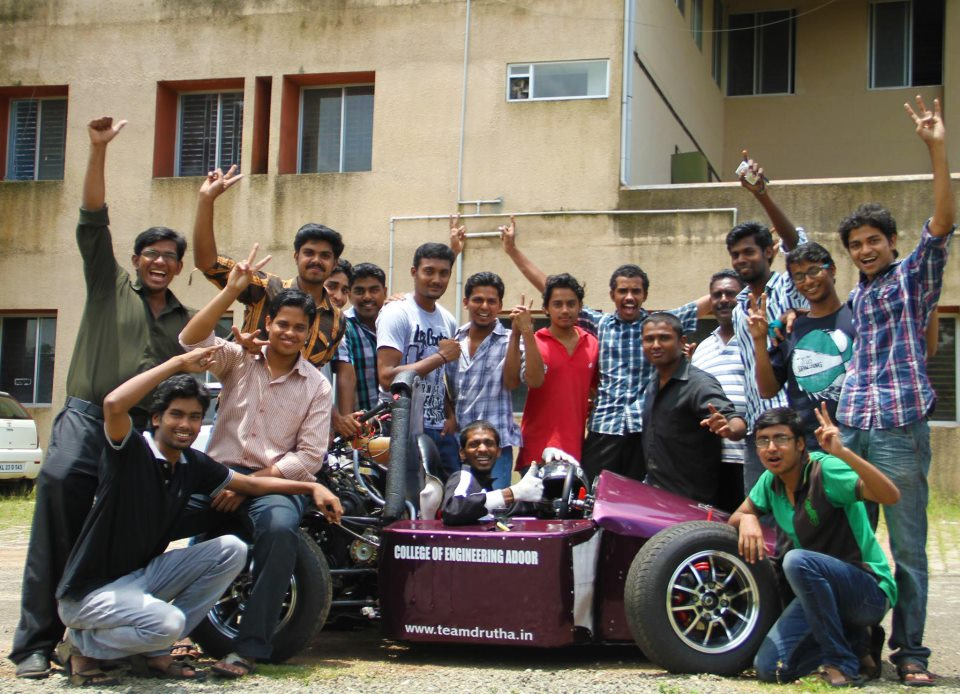
Team Drutha from College of Engineering Adoor at the finals of Supra Saeindia 2012

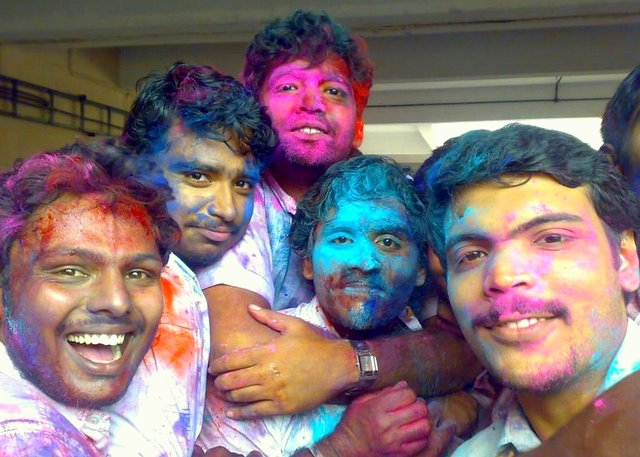
Holi celebrations at the college

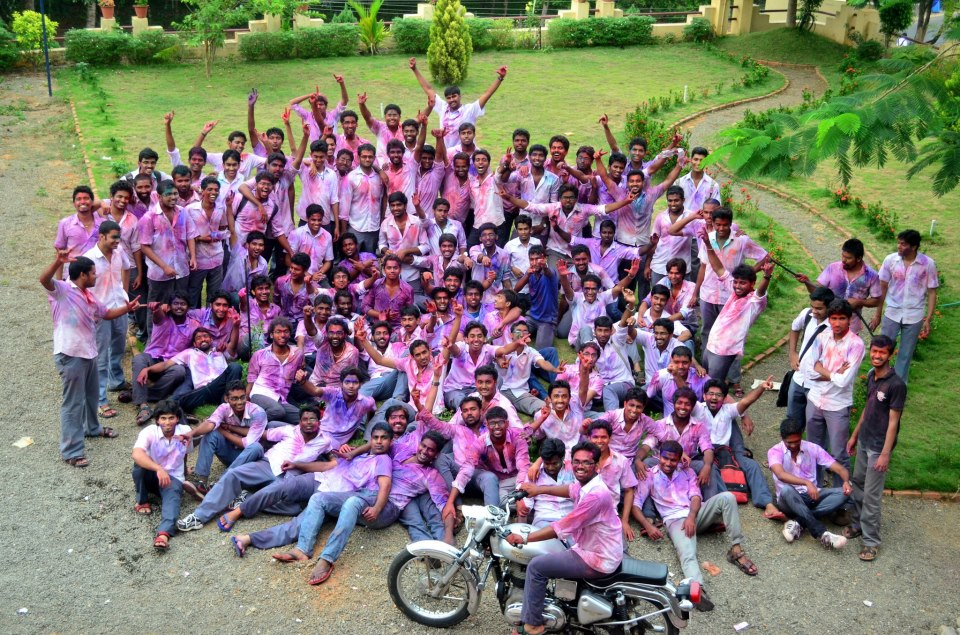
Holi celebration

== Controversies ==
On 19 August 2004, a 20 year old computer science graduate from the college named Rajani S. Anand committed suicide following her inability to pay hostel fee and reluctance from banks to give her student loan. This event led to resignation of then Chief minister of Kerala A. K. Antony.

== See also ==
- Cochin University of Science and Technology
- Institute of Human Resources Development
- List of Engineering Colleges in Kerala
- Adoor
- Manakala
