= Adoor =

Municipality in Kerala, India

- Municipality
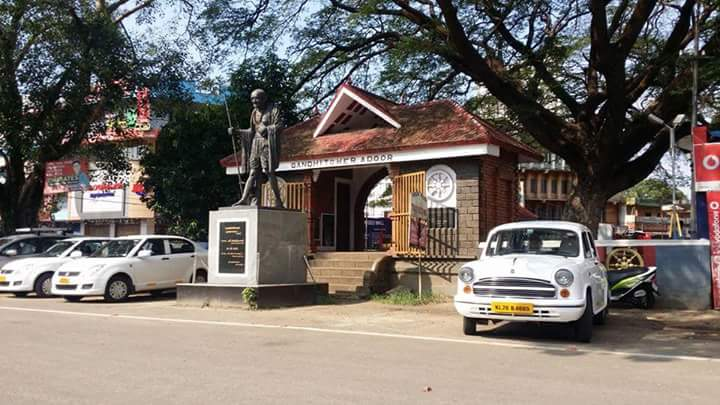
- Gandhi Park at Central junction Adoor

- Location in Kerala, India Adoor (India)
- Coordinates: 9.20°N 76.76°E
- Country: India
- State: Kerala
- District: Pathanamthitta

Government
  - Type: Municipality

Area
  - Total: 20.82 km^{2} (8.04 sq mi)

Population (2011)
  - Total: 29,171
  - Density: 1,401/km^{2} (3,629/sq mi)

Languages
  - Official: Malayalam, English
- Time zone: UTC+5:30 (IST)
- PIN: 691 523
- Telephone code: +91 4734-XXXXXX
- Vehicle registration: KL-26 (Adoor Sub RTO)
- Sex ratio: 1132 ♀/1000 ♂
- Nearest cities: Pathanamthitta (17 km), Kollam (44 km)
- Literacy: 96.31%
- Website: www.adoormunicipality.in

Adoor is a municipality in the Pathanamthitta district of Kerala, India. It is the headquarters of the Adoor taluk and Adoor revenue division. Adoor is located 17 km (10.6 mi) southwest of the district headquarters Pathanamthitta and 92 km (57.2 mi) north of the state capital Thiruvananthapuram.

According to the 2011 census of India, Adoor had a population of 29,171.

== Etymology ==
"Adoor" (Ad-oor) in Malayalam is derived from two words: "Ad" meaning "separated" (adarnu) and "oor" meaning "place" or "land". Thus, it translates to "adarnu kittiya ooru" in Malayalam, which means "land obtained through separation" in English.

The "Ad" can be also interpreted as "Aadyan" (ആഢ്യൻ), making it "Aadyanmaarude Ooru" (ആഢ്യൻമാരുടെ ഊര്) in Malayalam meaning "Land of the Noble Personnel" in English.

== History ==
The history of Adoor is directly connected to the history of Kollam district. During the 1st century A.D., most of the places in Kollam district were ruled by the Ay Kingdom, with their headquarters at south Travancore. It is known that during the rule of the Ay Kings, a Buddhist Monastery existed in Adoor. Some megalithic monuments like dolmens, dating back to the Neolithic period, have been discovered in the Enadimangalam village of Adoor Taluk.

Adoor was once part of Ilayidathu Dynasty and Pandalam dynasty. In 1741, Venad Maharaja Marthandavarma included Adoor to the Travancore Kingdom. King Marthanda Varma once came to Adoor to hide from Ettuvettil Pillai (a wealthy family who tried to capture King Marthandavarma and to get hold of his throne) and sought the help from Chittundayil house but it was refused and then support and shelter was provided by the grandmother of Nellimuttil family at Adoor, in the later days, after he became the King he then made revenge to the Chittundayil house and granted help to the Nellimuttil house. During the rule of Dharmaraja, a notable event was the battle against Tippu Sultan, where travancore made alliance with the East India Company. During the rule of Rani Gowri Parvathy Bayi, in 1812 A.D., pandalam was annexed to the kingdom of Travancore. The Anantharamapuram market situated at Parakkode is known to be one of the oldest, largest and busiest market during the Travancore era. After India got its independence in 1947, the Maharaja of Travancore refused to join Indian Union, but later had to agree. On 1 July 1949, Travancore and Cochin States were integrated and the Maharaja of Travancore became Rajpramukh of Travancore-Cochin State. On 1 November 1956, The State of Kerala was formed integrating the earlier regions of Travancore, Cochin and Malabar. After that, Adoor was in Kollam district until a new 13th district called, the Pathanamthitta District came into existence as a separate administrative unit on 1 November 1982. The newly formed Adoor Taluk comprised nine Villages of Kunnathur Taluk and two villages of Mavelikkara Taluk of former Kollam and Alappuzha districts. On 1 April 1990, Adoor municipality came into existence and the area under Adoor municipality is presently known as Adoor Town.

Adoor was part of Central Travancore and was never directly under British rule. Adoor was a major town of both wealthy Hindu families and notable Saint Thomas Christian families. Adoor was never captured by King Marthanadavarma.

Adoor Dharma Hospital (now known as Adoor General Hospital) was established in the 1880s during Travancore rule.

In 1914, the first school opened in Adoor: Adoor Malayalam School, known today as Adoor Govt. UP School.

In 1934, Mahatma Gandhi visited Adoor and laid the foundation stone of the present SNDP building situated near a private bus stand. The message of khadi and charkha gained more attention during this time. During the 1940s, communism started emerging in Adoor. Both the SNDP and NSS have made great contributions to the development of Adoor.

== Administration ==
Adoor is part of the Pathanamthitta district and is one of the two major revenue divisions of Pathanamthitta. Before the formation of the Pathanamthitta district in 1982, Adoor belonged to the Kollam district. Adoor's Assembly Constituency is a part of the newly formed Pathanamthitta Loksabha with the present MP being Shri Anto Antony. The present MLA of Adoor is Shri Chittayam Gopakumar.

=== Municipality Wards ===
Adoor Town consists of 28 wards of Adoor Municipality.

Ward No	Name of Ward	Councillor	Party
1	Mithrapuram	Susy Joseph	INC
2	E V ward	Anu Vasanthan	INC
3	Pannivizha	Apsara Sanal	CPI
4	Salvation Army	Rajani Ramesh	CPI(M)
5	Civil Station	Sasikumar	INC
6	Jawahar	D. Saji	CPI
7	Anandapally	Raji Cheriyan	CPI
8	Pothrodu	Sreeja R Nair	BJP
9	M G ward	Rameshkumar V	Independent
10	Bhagath Singh	Bindu Kumari G	INC
11	Pannivizha East	Sasikumar	INC
12	Sangamam	Reena Samuel	INC
13	Netaji	Gopalan K	CPM
14	Parakkode	M Alavudeen	Independent
15	Parakkode East	Anoop Chandrasekhar	INC
16	Anantharamapuram	Sudha Padmakumar	INC
17	Parakkode West	Sindhu Thulaseedhara Kuruppu	CPI
18	T B ward	Lali Saji	UDF
19	Kannamkodu North	Aji P Varghese	LDF
20	Adoor Central	Adv. S Shajahan	CPI(M)
21	Kannamkodu	Divya Reji	CPI(M)
22	Nellimootilpadi	Sreelekshmi Binu	INC
22	Ayyapanpara	Nezmal kavilayil	Independent
24	Town ward	Rony Panamthundil	CPI(M)
25	Munnalam	Anithadevi A	Independent
26	Priyadarshini	Sobha Thomas	Independent
27	Holycross	K Mahesh Kumar	LDF
28	Puthiyakavilchira	Jayakrishnan S	INC

=== Adoor Revenue Division ===
Adoor Taluk consists of two municipal towns: Adoor and Pandalam. Adoor is one among the only two revenue divisions of the Pathanamthitta district. The Adoor Revenue Division includes Kozhencherry (Pathanamthitta), Konni, and Adoor Taluks. The revenue division was previously located in the Kollam District. Adoor is located between the two major cities of Trivandrum and Kochi in south Kerala.

==== Thaluks under Adoor Revenue Division ====
No.	Thaluk Headquarters	Revenue divisions
1	Adoor	Adoor
2	Kozhencherry	Adoor
3	Konni	Adoor

=== Adoor Thaluk ===
==== Municipalities and Block Panchayats of Adoor Thaluk ====
With headquarters at Adoor town, the Adoor Thaluk consists of two Municipalities and two Block Panchayats. Pandalam Block Panchayat includes two Panchayats (Thumpamon, Pandalam Thekkekara) from Adoor Thaluk, while the remaining are under Kozhenchery Thaluk.

No	Local body name	Municipality/Block Panchayat	Thaluk	Revenue Division
1	Adoor	Municipality	Adoor	Adoor
2	Pandalam	Municipality	Adoor	Adoor
3	Parakkode	Block Panchayat	Adoor	Adoor
4	Pandalam	Block Panchayat	Adoor	Adoor

==== Panchayaths in Adoor Thaluk ====
No.	Panchayaths	Revenue divisions	Thaluk	Villages
1	Kodumon	Adoor	Adoor	Kodumon, Angadickal
2	Ezhamkulam	Adoor	Adoor	Ezhamkulam, Enathu
3	Pallickal	Adoor	Adoor	Pallickal, Peringanadu
4	Kadampanad	Adoor	Adoor	Kadampanad
5	Enadimangalam	Adoor	Adoor	Enadimangalam
6	Pandalam Thekkekara	Adoor	Adoor	Pandalam Thekkekara
7	Thumpamon	Adoor	Adoor	Thumpamon
8	Erathu	Adoor	Adoor	Erathu

== Demographics ==
Historical population
Year	Pop.	±%
1951	13,745	—
1991	26,639	+93.8%
2001	28,952	+8.7%
2011	29,171	+0.8%

As per the 2011 census of India, Adoor has a population of 29,171 and a population density of 1,401 inhabitants per square kilometre (3,630/sq mi). Of this, 47.1% are males and 52.9% are female. 8.27% of the population is under 6 years of age. Scheduled Castes and Scheduled Tribes constitute 12.41% and 0.13% of the population respectively. The total literacy rate was 96.31% (97.49% for males and 95.27% for females), which is higher than the state average of 94% and the national average of 74.04%.

=== Religion ===
Religion in Adoor (2011)
1. Hinduism (54.0%)
2. Christianity (36.5%)
3. Islam (9.33%)
4. None (0.10%)
5. Other (0.04%)

According to the 2011 census, Hindus are the majority with 54% of the population adhering to the religion. Christians form a significant minority, constituting 37% of the population. Muslims constitute 9% of the population.

== Hospitals and Dental Clinics ==
- Govt. General Hospital, Adoor

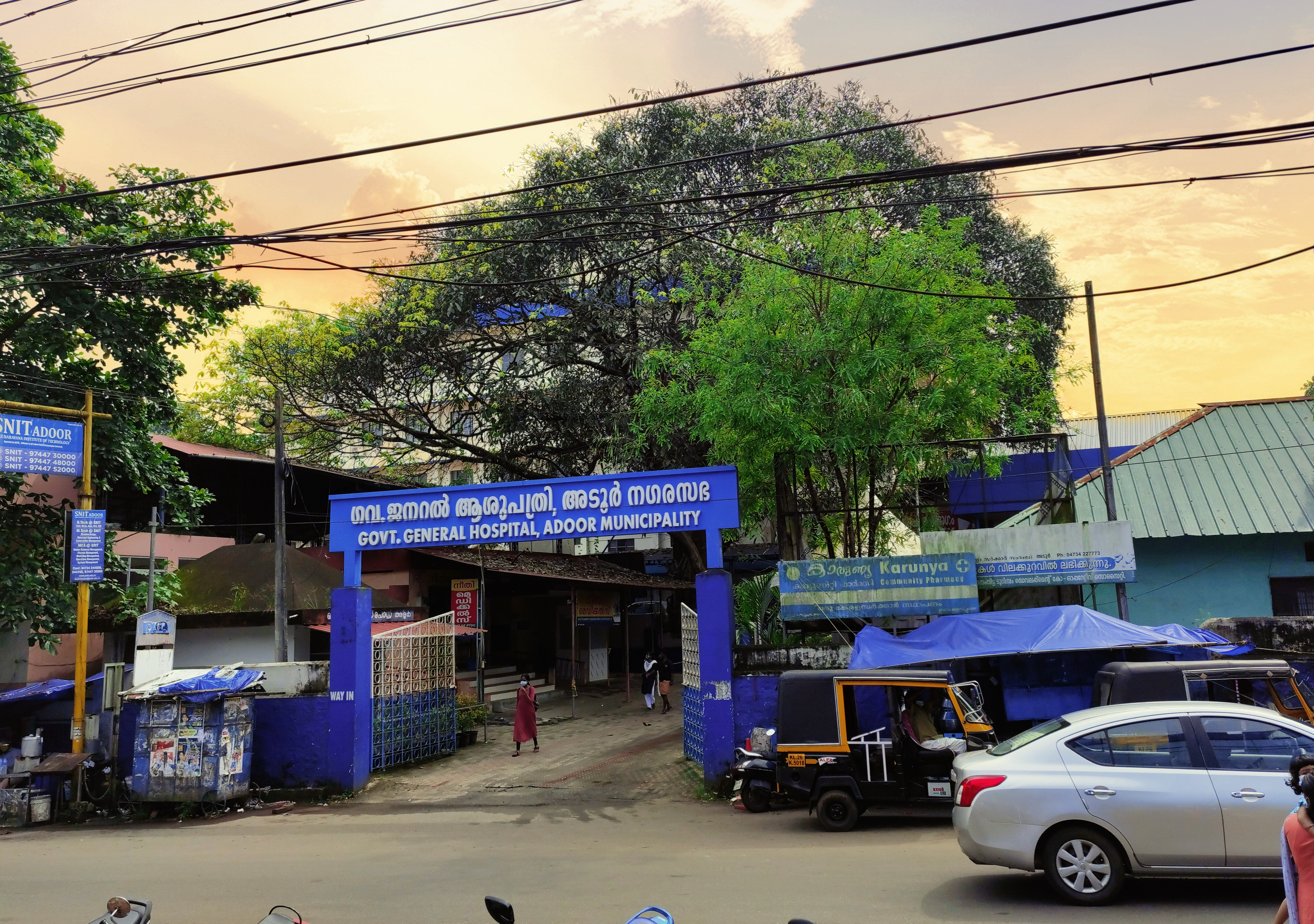
General Hospital, Adoor

- Lifeline superspeciality hospital and fertility clinic, Adoor
- Mount Zion medical college Hospital, Adoor
- Hollycross Hospital, Adoor
- Maria Hospital, Adoor
- Mount Sinai Medical Centre, Paranthal
- Government Veterinary Hospital, Adoor
- Moses Dental Clinic, Adoor
- Ceegees Grace Dental Centre, Adoor

Adoor has at least four medical colleges within 40 km radius or one hour travel proximity. Famous Medical colleges and hospitals include Konni Government Medical College (28 km), Pushpagiri Medical College (31 km), Believers Church Medical College Hospitals (37 km) and Muthootu Medical Centre Pathanamthitta (18 km).

== Landmarks ==
Adoor is home to many places of worship, including the Mannadi Temple.

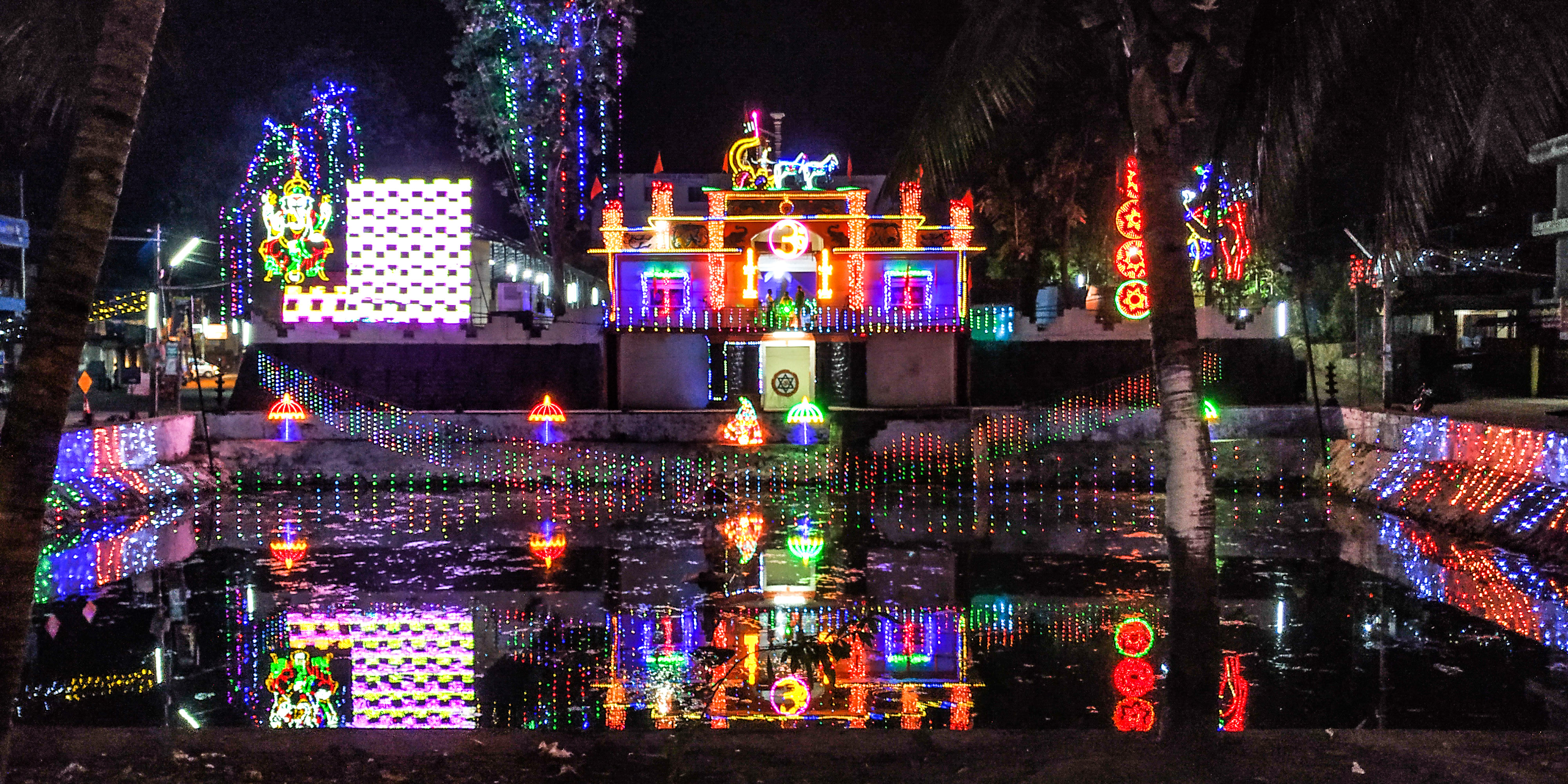
Parthasarathy Temple, Adoor

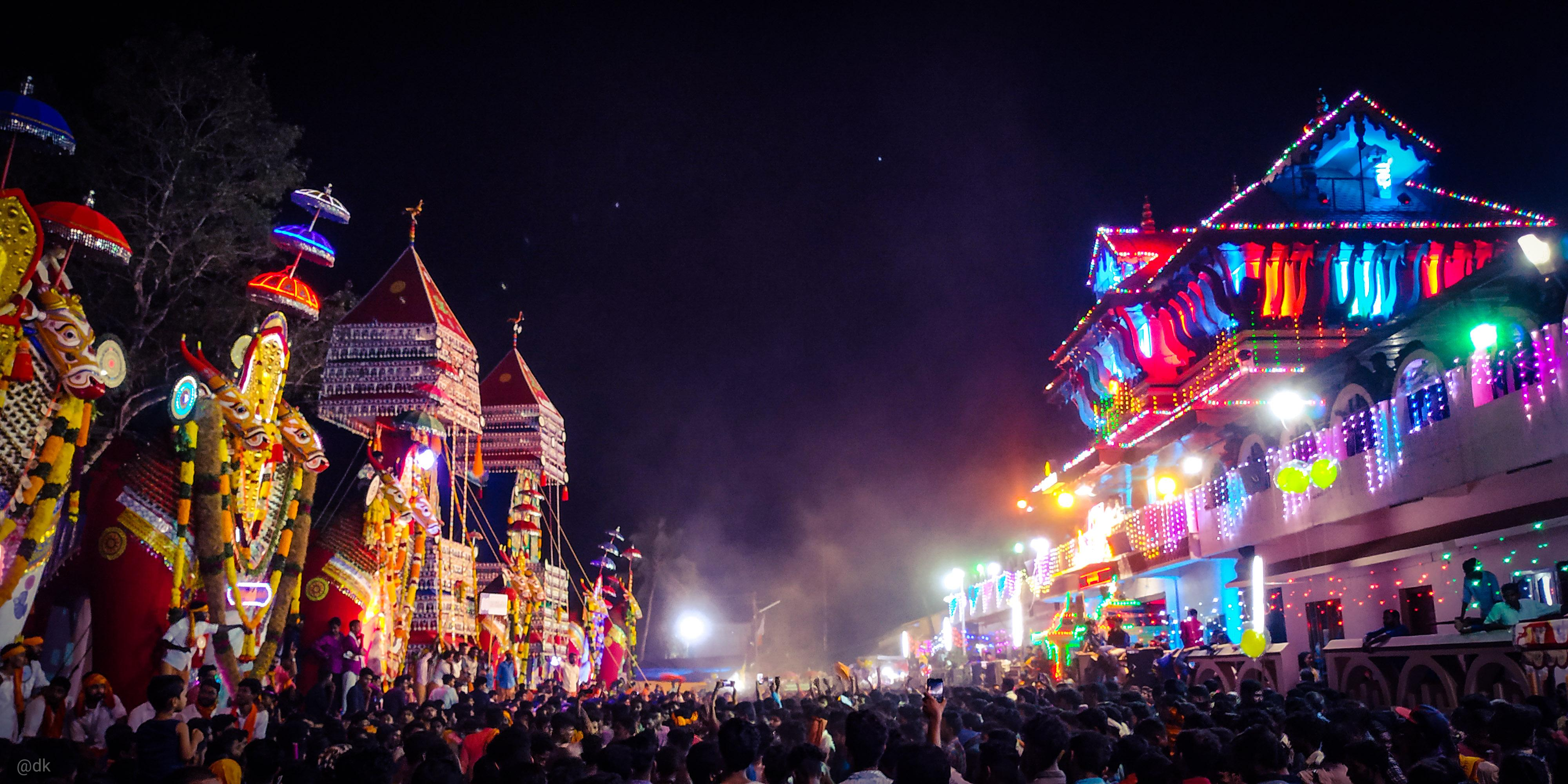
rightTrichendamangalam Mahadevar Temple

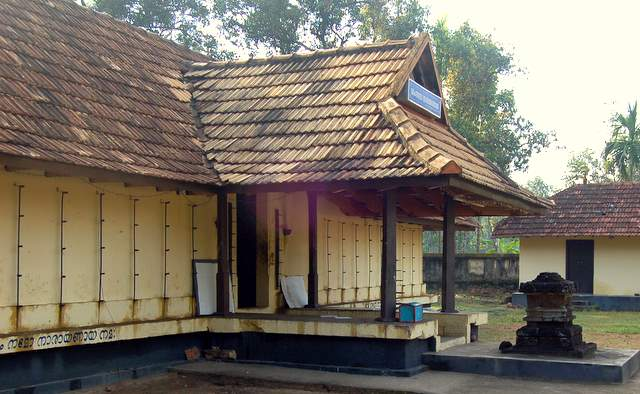
Sree Narayanapuram Mahavishnu Temple

- Sree Narayanapuram Mahavishnu Temple

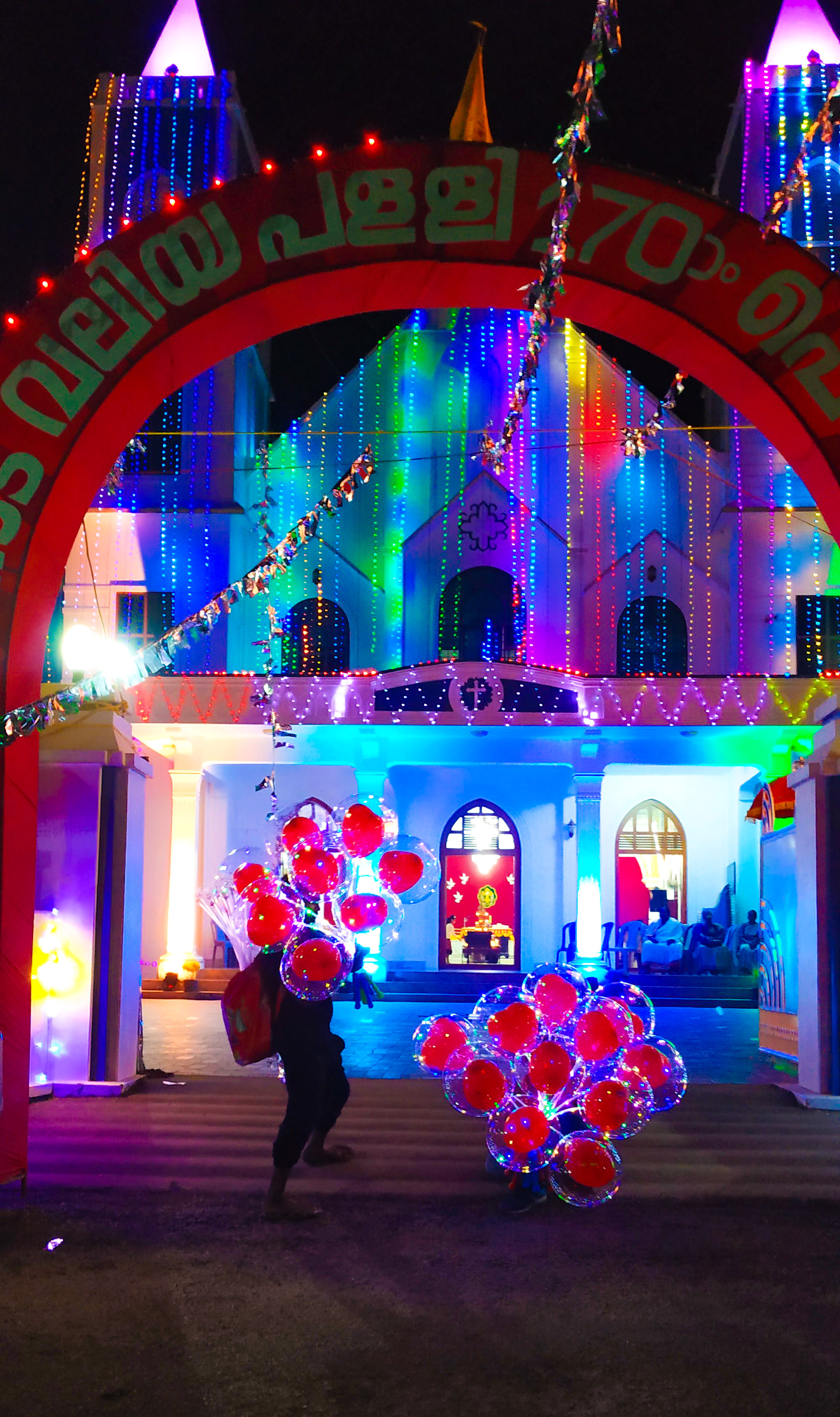
Marthashamuni Orthodox Church, Moonnalam

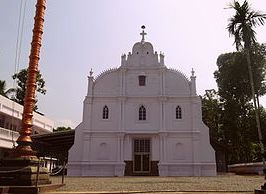
St. Thomas Malankara Syrian Orthodox Cathedral, Kadampanad

- Juma Al Masjid, Central - Adoor
- Gandhi Circle, Adoor
- St. Thomas Orthodox Cathedral, Kannamcode
- St. Mary's Orthodox Church | Holy MarthaMariam Pilgrim Centre, Karuvatta - Adoor

== Transportation ==
=== Road ===
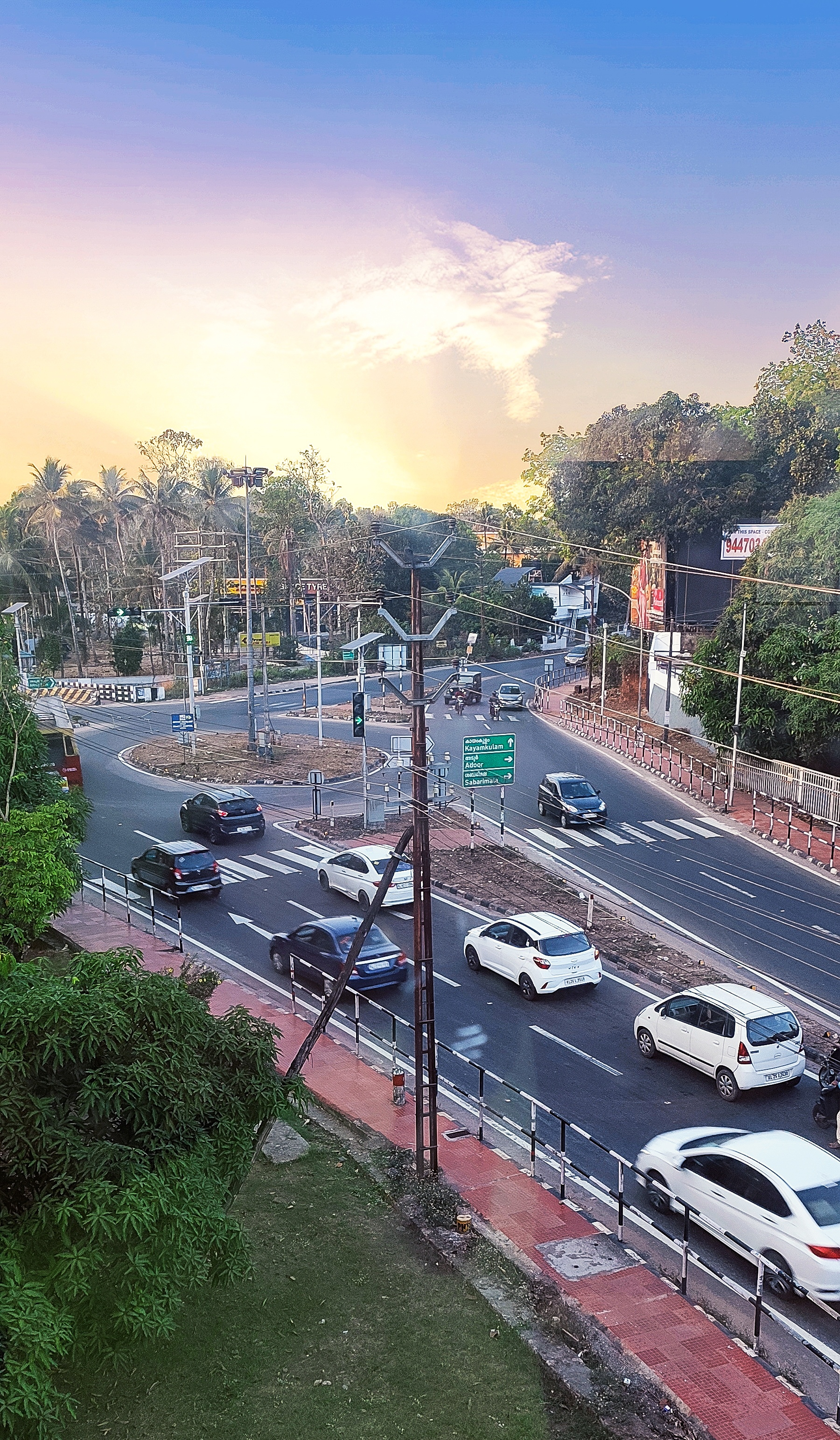
Nellimootilpadi bypass end at Adoor

Adoor is a junction with major roads connecting it to Ernakulam, Trivandrum, Kayankulam, Punalur, Pathanamthitta and Kollam. The only means of transport in Adoor is roadways. There are two bus stands in Adoor. KSRTC bus stand has got 24 hours bus services with daily interstate, interdistrict and town connectivity. The municipal bus stand near bypass stations all private busses.

KSRTC provides services to nearby states of Karnataka and Tamil Nadu. Major services include super deluxe, superfast, and fast passengers to Mangalore, Manipal, Marthandam, Thalakkulam, Sulthan Batheri, Perikkalur, Kannur, Udayagiri, Kozhikode, Thrissur, Ernakulam, Trivandrum.

Bus services from other depots towards Bangalore (Scania), Sulliya (Super Deluxe), Batheri (Super Deluxe), Thenkasi (Fast Passenger), Pazhani (Super Fast, Fast Passenger) are also available.

Private bus services like Kallada, Kerala Lines, and Rukma have daily services towards Bangalore, Chennai, and other destinations from Adoor.

Being the center of southern Kerala, Adoor has good highways and modern roads for travel and the shipment of goods. Adoor has the MC road (SH1) passing through it until Trivandrum and the National Highway 183A passing through Adoor connecting Pathanamthitta and other major places. Built during the era of the Travancore Dynasty, recently MC road from Kazhakoottam to Adoor was raised to the status of safety road. This is the first safety road project to be built in Kerala. Adoor bypass starts from Nellimutilpadi in Adoor, passes through Moonnalam, and ends at Karuvatta in Adoor. The Kayamkulam-Punalur (SH8) road also passes through Adoor making it the centre of Kayamkulam and Punalur. KP Road connects Adoor to various places like Charummood, Pathanapuram. People mostly use MC-Road in Adoor for traveling to Trivandrum rather than using National Highway 66 to avoid traffic jams. This makes the MC-Road the most popular route for traveling to Trivandrum. The National Highway 183, which Starts from Kollam, passes through Adoor and ends at Theni in Tamil Nadu. There are plans to bring ring roads within Adoor. The upcoming projects of renovating and expanding 110 crores Anayadi- Koodal road and 42crore Ezhamkulam - Kaipattoor -Konni-road are under process.

=== Airports ===
The nearest airport is at Thiruvananthapuram-Thiruvananthapuram International Airport which is 90 km (56 mi) away.

=== Railways ===
The nearest railway stations are Kayamkulam Junction Railway Station 25 km (16 mi) away, Chengannur Railway Station, Kottarakara Railway Station (21.5 km). A railway station was planned for Adoor but this plan was shifted to Mavelikkara. There are considerations about bringing a major junction railway station to Adoor. The proposed railway station will have railway flyovers and nearly eight tracks with lines Kayamkulam-Punalur via Adoor, Chengannur-Thiruvananthapuram via Adoor.

== Education ==
- College of Engineering, Adoor

== Notable people ==
- Adoor Bhasi, actor
- Adoor Bhavani, actress
- Adoor Gopalakrishnan, director
- Dr. Jitheshji, World's Fastest Cartoonist
- Govindankutty, actor-anchor
- Gouri G. Kishan, actress
- Adoor Pankajam, actress
- Adoor Prakash Former Konni MLA, former Kerala Minister, present Attingal MP
- E. V. Krishna Pillai, writer
