= List of villages in Thrissur district =

This is a list of villages in Thrissur district, Kerala, India.

- Adat
- Alapad
- Alathur
- Alur
- Amala Nagar
- Amballur
- Ammadam
- Anandapuram
- Anjur
- Annakara
- Annallur
- Anthicad
- Aranattukara
- Arangottukara
- Arattupuzha
- Arimbur
- Arimpur
- Aripalam
- Ashtamichira
- Athani
- Attoor
- Attore South
- Attore North
- Avanur
- Avittathur
- Azhikode
- Chalakkal
- Chamakunnu
- Chathakudam
- Chazhoor
- Chelakkara
- Chelakode
- Chembuthara
- Chemmanthatta
- Chendrappini
- Chengallur
- Chentrappinni
- Chermanangad
- Cherpu
- Cheruthuruthi
- Cheruval
- Chevvoor
- Chirakkal
- Chiramanangad
- Chiranellur
- Chittanda
- Chittilappilly
- Chittatukara
- Chiyyaram
- Choolissery
- Choondal
- Chowwannur (Part)
- Chowwannur
- Desamangalam
- Edakkalathur
- Edakkazhiyur
- Edathirinji
- Edathiruthy
- Edavilangu
- Elanad
- Elanjipra
- Elavally
- Elinjipra
- Engandiyur
- Enkakkad
- Eranellur
- Eravathur
- Eravimangalam
- Eravu
- Erayamkudy
- Eyyal
- Inchamudi
- Iranikulam
- Irimbranallur
- Irinjalakuda
- Kadangode
- Kadappuram
- Kadavallur
- Kadikkad
- Kadukutty
- Kaduppassery
- Kainoor
- Kaipamangalam
- Kaiparamba
- Kakkulissery
- Kallettumkara
- Kalletumkara
- Kallur Thekkummuri
- Kallur Vadakkummuri
- Kallur
- Kandanassery
- Kandanissery
- Kanipayyur (Part)
- Kanipayyur
- Kaniyarkode
- Kanjany
- Kanjirakode
- Kannamkulangara
- Karalam (Part)
- Karalam
- Karamuck
- Karanchira
- Karikkad
- Kariyannur
- Karumanassery
- Karumathra
- Karumathara
- Kattakampal
- Kattoor
- Kattur
- Keralasseri
- Killannur
- Killimangalam
- Kinassery
- Kiralur
- Kizhakkummuri
- Kizhuppillikkara
- Kochanoor
- Kodakara
- Kodaly
- Kodannur
- Kodassery
- Kondazhy
- Koolimuttam
- Koottala
- Koratty
- Kottanellur
- Kottapadi
- Kottappuram
- Kozhukkully
- Kumaranellur
- Kundazhiyur
- Kurichikkara
- Kurumala
- Kurumpilavu
- Kuruvilassery
- Kuttanchery
- Kuthampully
- Kuttichira
- Kuttoor
- Kuzhur
- Laloor
- Lokamaleswaram (Kodungallur central)
- Madakkathara
- Madathumpady
- Madayikonam
- Mambra
- Manakkody
- Manalithara
- Manalur
- Manavalassery
- Mangad (Part)
- Mangad
- Mannamangalam
- Mannuthy
- Marottichal
- Mathilakam
- Mattathur
- Mayannur
- Melur
- Minalur
- Mulayam
- Mullassery
- Mullurkara
- Mullur, Thrissur
- Mundathikode
- Mupliyam
- Muringur Vadakkummuri
- Muriyad
- Mala
- Muthuvara
- Nandipulam
- Nattika
- Nedumpura
- Nellayi
- Nelluwaya
- Nooluvally
- Olarikara
- Ollukkara
- Oorakam
- Orumanayur
- Padinjare Vemballur
- Padiyam
- Padiyur
- Padukad
- Painkulam
- Palakkal
- Pallippuram
- Pallur
- Pananchery
- Panangad
- Pangarappilly
- Panjal
- Pappinivattom
- Parakkad
- Paralam
- Parappukkara
- Parappur
- Parekkattukara
- Pariyaram
- Parlikad
- Pattikkad
- Pavartty
- Pazhanji
- Pazhayannur
- Peechi
- Pengamuck
- Peramangalam
- Peringandoor
- Peringottukara
- Perinjanam
- Perumpilavu
- Peruvallur
- Peruvamkulangara
- Pidikkaparambu
- Pilakkad
- Pillakkad
- Poomangalam
- Pooppathy
- Poovathussery
- Porathissery
- Porkulam
- Potta
- Poyya
- Pudukad
- Pulakode
- Pullazhi
- Pullu
- Pullur
- Punnayur
- Punnayurkulam
- Puthenchira
- Puthur
- Puthuruthy
- Puzhakkal
- Talikkulam
- Thalassery, Thrissur district
- Thalore
- Thangalur
- Thanikkudam
- Thanniyam
- Thayyur
- Thazhekkad
- Thekkumkara
- Thichur
- Thirumukkulam
- Thiruvilwamala
- Tholur
- Thonnurkara
- Thottippal
- Thoykavu
- Thrithallur
- Trikkur
- Vadakkaanchery
- Vadakkekad
- Vadakkethara
- Vadakkumbhagom
- Vadakkumkara
- Vadakkummuri
- Vadama
- Vadanappally
- Valapad
- Valappad
- Valiya Chenam
- Vallachira
- Vallathol Nagar
- Vallissery
- Vallivattom
- Varandarappilly
- Varavoor
- Velappaya
- Vellangallur
- Vellani
- Vellanikkara
- Vellarakkad
- Vellatanjoor
- Vellattanjur
- Vellikulangara
- Vellookkara
- Velukkara
- Velur
- Veluthur
- Vendore
- Venganellur
- Venginissery
- Venkitangu
- Vennur
- Viruppakka
- Vylathur
