= Mukundapuram Taluk =

Mukundapuram taluk
- Taluk
- Mukundapuram Taluk
- Country: India
- State: Kerala
- District: Thrissur District
- Headquarters: Irinjalakuda

Languages
  - Official: Malayalam, English
- Time zone: UTC+5:30 (IST)
- Vehicle registration: KL

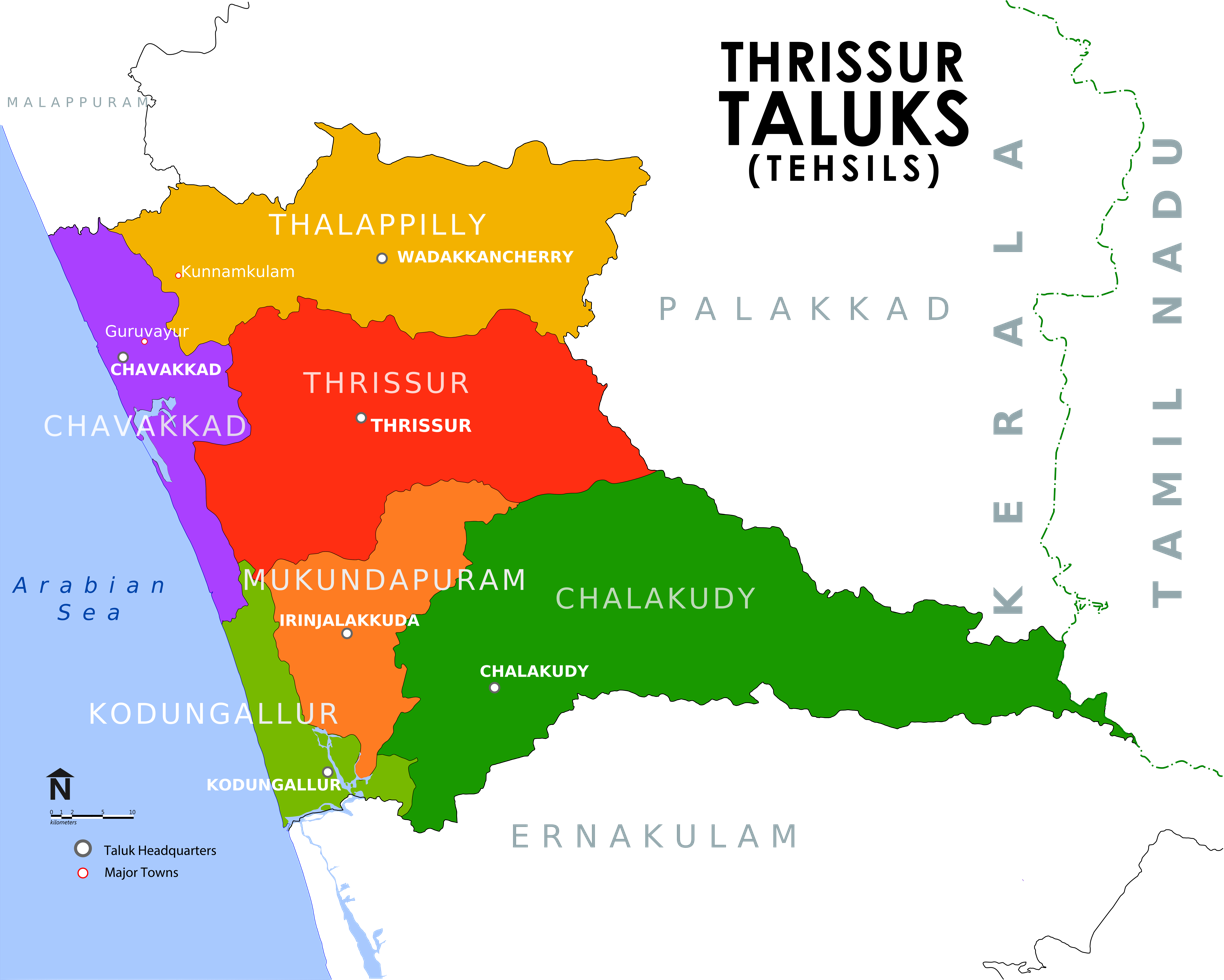
Taluks in Thrissur District

Mukundapuram Taluk is a taluk (tehsil) in Irinjalakuda Revenue Division of Thrissur district in the Indian state of Kerala. In 1762 this taluk was formed by Cochin King. When new Chalakudy taluk was formed in 2013 it lost majority of its territory. At present, the headquarters of the taluk is Irinjalakuda and it comprises 29 villages:

1. Amballur
2. Anandapuram
3. Avittathur
4. Chengallur
5. Edathirinji
6. Irinjalakkuda
7. Kaduppassery
8. Kallur
9. Karalam
10. Karumathra
11. Kattur
12. Kottanellur
13. Madayikonam
14. Manavalassery
15. Muriyad
16. Nellayi
17. Nenmanikkara
18. Padiyur
19. Parappukkara
20. Poomangalam
21. Porathissery
22. Pullur
23. Puthenchira
24. Thekkumkara
25. Thoravu
26. Thottippal
27. Thrikkur
28. Vadakkumkara
29. Vallivattam
30. Velukkara

== See also ==
- Chaipankuzhy
