= Vellangallur Grama Panchayath =

Vellangallur
- Panchayath
- Location in Kerala, India Vellangallur (India)
- Coordinates: 10.3013°N 76.2160°E
- Country: India
- State: Kerala
- District: Thrissur
- Established: 1953

Area
  - Total: 26.61 km^{2} (10.27 sq mi)

Population (2001)
  - Total: 32,846
  - Density: 1,234/km^{2} (3,197/sq mi)

Languages
  - Official: Malayalam, English
- Time zone: UTC+5:30 (IST)
- PIN: 680662
- Website: isgkerala.in/vellangallurpanchayat

Vellangallur is a Grama Panchayath situated in Thrissur district in the Indian state of Kerala.

== Geography ==
The nearest towns Irinjalakuda, Kodungallur and Mala.

Vellangallur Panchayat office is situated in Konathukunnu. Vallivattam, Thekkumkara, Vadakkumkara, and Karumathra villages are included in this panchayat.

Vallivattom is a village in the Mukundapuram Taluk with an area of 845 hectares and harbouring 2112 households with a total population of 8537 as per the 2011 Census.

== Transport ==
The village is located at the junction of State Highway 22 (Thrissur-Kodungallur) and Chalakudy-Mathilakam Road, which connects NH 66 and NH 544. The nearest railway station Irinjalakuda (11 km). The nearest airport is Cochin International Airport (37km).

== Demographics ==
The population is 32,846, including 15,599 men and 17,247 women.

The literacy rate is 88.19%. Male literacy is 93.22%, and female literacy is 83.76%.

== Economy ==
Bank branches in this Panchayat include Canara Bank, Indian Overseas Bank, South Indian Bank, Punjab National Bank, Federal Bank and Dhanalakshmi Bank. Several other cooperative banks are present.

Salim Ali Foundation runs a sustainable development project. The project envisages development without damaging the environment.
