= St. Joseph's Church, Aloor =

- Aloor Valiya Palli
- Location: Aloor, Thrissur, Kerala
- Country: India
- Denomination: Syro-Malabar Catholic

History
- Status: Parish
- Founded: 1858
- Dedicated: 1868

Administration
- District: Thrissur
- Province: Thrissur
- Diocese: Syro-Malabar Catholic Eparchy of Irinjalakuda
- Parish: St. Joseph's Church, Aloor

Clergy
- Bishop: Mar Pauly Kannookadan

St. Joseph Church, Aloor is a parish of the Syro-Malabar Catholic Church in Aloor. It was the first parish church in Aloor Muri of the Mukundapuram and Kodassery taluks. Aloor parish is one of the 83 parishes between the Bharathappuzha and Periyar rivers, during the erection of syro-Malabar hierarchy and Trichur Vicariate.

The Nazrani community of Aloor built a small prayer hall made of bamboo and palm leaf upon land donated by its members in 1858, and used it for their usual prayer necessities. The church did not get approval for parish status from the authorities, however, due to some administrative schisms prevailed in the Indian catholic church in 19th century. In 1868, the Aloor church was recognized by the Vicariate Apostolic of Verapoly. When the Syro-Malabar hierarchy was re-established in 1887, it was placed under the Vicariate Apostolic of Thrissur.

The church is locally noted for housing two distinct and relatively uncommon devotional statues within the same परिसर, making it a point of interest among regional Christian devotional practices.

• Sleeping St. Joseph statue

The church contains a statue of St. Joseph depicted in a reclining or sleeping posture. This form of devotion has gained wider recognition in recent years, particularly among the faithful who associate it with intercessory prayer by placing written petitions near the statue.

• Sleeping Mother Mary with Infant Jesus In addition to the St. Joseph statue, the church also houses a separate statue of the Virgin Mary shown in a resting or sleeping position alongside the infant Jesus. This depiction is comparatively rare in Christian iconography and reflects a localized devotional expression emphasizing maternal care and the Holy Family.

== History ==
Year	Event	From	To
1858	Construction of the ‘prayer chapel’ at Aloor		
1868	Aloor Church approved	Chalakudy, St. Mary`s Forane Church	Aloor, St. Josephs Church was approved by Vicariate of Verapoly
1872	Aloor Parish erected	Chalakudy, St. Mary`s Forane Church	Aloor, St. Josephs Parish was erected by parishioners.
26 January 1966	Territory Lost from Aloor parish	Chalakudy, St. Mary`s Forane parish and Aloor St. Joseph's parish (partly)	Vellanchira, Our Lady of Fathima parish was erected
7 July 1985	Territory Lost from Aloor parish	Aloor, St. Josephs Church	Anathadam, St. Thomas parish was erected
1 January 2006	Territory Lost from Aloor parish	Aloor, St. Josephs Church (major portion), Kallettumkara and Anathadam (partly)	Aloor Junction(west), Prasadavaranatha parish was erected
15 August 2007	Territory Lost from Aloor parish	Aloor, St. Josephs Church	Kalvarikunnu, Our Lady of Dolours parish was erected
15 August 2022	Territory Lost from Aloor parish	Aloor, St. Josephs Church, Karoor St.Marys Rosary church, Vellanchira, Our Lady of Fathima church	Sholayar, St. Mariam Thresia parish was erected

Aloor is a village 25 km towards north east of Muziris (Kodungallur)—the cradle of Christianity in India—where Saint Thomas the Apostle arrived in Malabar in AD 52 for evangelisation. The Christian community existed in Aloor from a very ancient period, depending on the churches at Ambazhakkad (300 AD), Chalakudy (600 AD) and Velayanad (900 AD) for their liturgical needs. In 1790, the churches at Ambazhakkad, Velayanad and Thazhekad were ravaged and many laymen were martyred for faith during the invasion of Tipu Sultan's army to the kingdoms of Cochin and Travancore. The need for a new church was aroused in the region due to the loss of their ancient churches and influx of laity from surrounding regions. The Syrian Catholic community was forced to depend on the Vicariate Apostolic of Verapoly during this period after the suppression of the Syrian Padruado Archdiocese of Cranganore (1838). They paid little attention to request made by the people for the sanctioning of a new church here.

== 1858–1868: Struggle for liturgy and hierarchy ==
The pleas of the Syrian Catholic community for their church at Aloor were denied during the period of the bishops Ludovico Nartini (1839–1859) and Bernardino Baccinelli (1859–1868) of the Vicariate of Verapoly. The community leaders also made repeated pleas to both the Pope and the Chaldean Syrian Catholic Patriarch of Babylonia, who had the jurisdiction over the Catholics Syrians in India until 1865, for their own bishop and liturgy. In response these pleas, Patriarch Joseph VI Audo (the Chaldean Patriarch) sent a request to Pope Pius IX for the Catholic Syrians in Malabar to be placed under his authority. He dispatched Mar Thomas Rokos, bishop of Basra (1861) and Mar Elias Mellus, Bishop of 'Aqra (1874), to visit the Catholic Syrian Christians. They had substantial success in convincing Catholic Syrians in Thrissur District, from Chalakudy to Palayur (Chavakkad).

The Syrian Catholic community in Aloor aligned with the prominent parishes like Our Lady of Dolours Church Thrissur, St Thomas Church Palayur, St George’s Church (now St. Thomas Cathedral), Irinjalakuda, etc. in the movement for their own bishop and liturgy. It was a natural response of the people who were reeling under the yoke of unmindful latinization by the missionaries and the Bishops and the requests for a native bishop fell in deaf ears. The Syrian Catholic community later understood that these bishops had come without the knowledge of the Pope and the community continued in obedience with Rome.

In 1865, the jurisdiction of the East Syrian Patriarch over the Syrian Catholics in India was formally terminated by the Apostolic See. In 1868, Leonardo Mellano became the bishop of Verapoly and he gave approval for the church at Aloor. The Syrian Catholic community continued their struggle to have a hierarchy of its own rite—with native Bishops. Rome sent a few apostolic visitors to study the situation of leaking. Rev Leo Meurin S J in 1875 and Rev Igantius Pertico in 1876 arrived in Malabar. As a result, the Hierarchy of Syrian Catholics was restored in AD 1887 with the erection of Trichur and Kottayam vicariates for the Syrian Catholic Christians, separating them from the Latin rite Catholics.

== 1868–1872: Approval from Rome ==
In 1868, Aloor church got approval from the Vicariate of Verapoly. Thus liturgical services were offered in the small church built in the land donated by the members of Syrian Catholic community in 1858. Pope Pius IX proclaimed Saint Joseph the patron and protector of the Universal Church in 1870. St. Joseph’s Church, Aloor was elevated to parish status in 1872 under the Vicariate of Verapoly (with 100 families mainly from Chalakudy and Velayanad (Rocos faction) parishes. The huge wooden image (Statue) of the patron of the church for dedication was donated by the Menachery Erinjery family of Ollur, who were great devotees of St. Joseph. When the Syro Malabar hierarchy was re-established in 1887, this prominent parish was placed under the Vicariate of Thrissur (now the Syro-Malabar Catholic Archeparchy of Thrissur) as one of the 83 parishes between Bharathapuzha and Periyar rivers, during its erection. In 1937 Aloor parish came under Chalakudy Forane division. In 1978 Syro-Malabar Catholic Eparchy of Irinjalakuda was erected and Aloor parish was placed under the new eparchy.

== Filial churches ==
During the period of restoration of Syro-Malabar hierarchy in 1887, the area under the territory of Syro-Malabar Catholic Eparchy of Irinjalakuda consisted of only 20 parishes including Aloor. The Aloor muri region was almost coterminous with the territory of Aloor Parish. The southern border was redefined after the formation of Karoor (1905) and Kuzhikkattussery (1904) parishes. The western border was defined when the Thazhekkad parish (1911) was erected. The Eastern and northern borders were redefined after the formation of Potta and Kodakara parishes respectively. Many parishes and daughter churches were erected from Aloor parish by separating Thazhekkad, Vellanchira (partly), Potta (partly), kodakaraka (partly), Anathadam, Aloor Prasadavaranatha (major portion) and Kalvarikunnu which resulted in the loss of parish territory.

The baptism records preserved in the church office provides the proof that the laity lived near main road from pulparakunnu to Puthukkavu Junction (now Kodakara Parish) also depended the Aloor church for their liturgical needs. The liturgical needs of the faithful of St. Marys Rosary Church, Karoor were fulfilled by the vicars of Aloor church until 1914. Pastoral care was given to Fatima Matha Church, Vellanchira, St. Thomas Church Anathadam, Prasadavaranatha church Aloor and Vyakulamatha Church, Kalvarikunnu parishes by the vicars of Aloor church until they get independent vicars and parish status. St. Thomas Church Anathadam(1973), Vyakulamatha Church Kalvarikunnu (1994) and Prasadavaranatha Church were erected as the filial churches under Aloor parish. St. Mary's Church, Aloor East (1985)is a filial church which is a part of Aloor St. Joseph Parish.

== Prayer system ==
The Holy Mass, which is called Holy Qurbana in East Syriac Aramaic and means 'Eucharist', is celebrated in its solemn form on Sundays and special occasions. Full length Holy Mass following the Syro-Malabar liturgy and calendar is performed on all days. Currently they celebrate the Divine Liturgy of Addai and Mari in Malayalam.

== Festivals ==
The feast of Mar Youseph (Saint Joseph), the patron, is celebrated on the Sunday on or after 23 January, as it is (traditionally) considered as day in which the Joseph Betrothed (kiddushin) to Mary. 'Ambuperunnal' or the feast of Epiphany and Mar Sebastianos Sahada (Saint Sebastian) is celebrated on the Saturday of the patron’s feast. The feast of Saint Mary, Mother of God is celebrated on the first Sunday of October. The memorial day of Mar Geevarghis Sahada (Saint George, the martyr) is traditionally celebrated on the Sunday on or after 23 April.

Pindiperunnal ('Denaha perunnal') or the feast of Epiphany, Christmas (25 December), Easter, Dukrane d Marthoma (3 July), the Nativity of the Blessed Virgin Mary (8 September), Holy Week, and other standard feasts are also observed.

== Charitable activities ==
A primary school was established in the premises of Aloor church in 1894 which was managed by the parishioners (now St. JBCLPS Aloor). Later it was handed over free of cost to CHF sisters in 1934. In 1947, the Aloor church donated one acre of land to the government to run a hospital for mothers and children. The church also constructed a building on this land and donated it for the purpose, which serves today as Aloor's primary health center. The government veterinary hospital, village library, and ESI hospital also operate from land and buildings donated by the church.

The church has also constructed and donated many houses in different parts of the parish. In 2008, a social welfare project of Rs 1 Crore was implemented in connection with the sesquicentennial jubilee (150 years) of the first ‘prayer chapel’ of 1858 that was later developed into Aloor church. The Jubilee Nagar was set up on the land donated by the parishioners, and many houses were built for the homeless. Anganwadi of ward 22, Aloor panchayat is functioning in the land provided by the church in Jubilee Nagar.

== Thazhekad Church ==
Thazhekad Church, dedicated to Marth Mariam, is the first church founded in Aloor panchayath. In the floor of the cross in front of the church is an inscription indicating the church's founding in the year 800 A.D. This community was primarily under the jurisdiction of Ambazhakad and later under the parish of Marth Mariam church, Velayanad.

=== Shasanas ===
The Thazhekad Sasanam (Thazhekad Church privileges) is still preserved in this church. These are the privileges given to the Christian traders and nazrani leaders—Iravi Korthan and Chathan Vadukan of Manigramam—of this place by Rajasimha a Chera King (1028–1043) a contemporary of Rajendra Chola I. The Sasanas are written in the form of "Vattezhuthu" (Kollavarsham, 203–218) (For details see: History of the places of Kerala, Trichur District, p. 118 by V.V.K. Valath). The inscription can be dated palaeographically to between the 8th and 10th centuries. The destruction of the port of Thazhekad diminished its commercial importance. The church was ravaged by Tippu Sultan's army, during his invasion of to Cochin and Travancore, between 1789 and 1791.

In 1861, Fr. Yohannan Chittilappilly, a Syrian Catholic priest, received permission from the Vicariate of Verapoly to construct a new church on Thazhekkad property situated in the northern area of Velayanad parish. But instead of reconstructing the ravaged Thazhekad church, he sought the help of the Anti Rocos faction of Syrian Catholics and constructed Infant Jesus Church at Kallettumkara with their support. The Bishop of Verapoly, who was against the struggle for liturgy and hierarchy of Syrian Catholics, suddenly raised this church to parish status in 1861, incorporating a wider area of Kallettumkara, Muriyad, parts of Kaduppassery and Thazhekkad muris of the then Thazhekkad territory, and parts of Kodakara of Mukundapuram taluk. The majority of the Christians of Kuzhikkattussery muri (South of Kundayi Junction to Parambi Road Junction) of Thazhekkad territory were attached to the Puthenchira church at that time. But the Rocos faction of Syrian Catholics of the region remained with the Velayanad parish, and later some of them joined with Aloor parish. When The Thazhekad church was rebuilt in 1911, some of them joined in Thazhekad parish. Infant Jesus Church (1861) is the first church in Kallettumkara muri of Mukundapuram taluk.

=== Pilgrimage ===
The Thazhekad church was rebuilt in 1911 as St. Sebastian's church due to the presence of holy icon of St. Sebastian. The church is famous for the feast of Kurisu Muthappan (St. Sebastian) on 2 and 3 May every year. The Archdiocese of Thrissur declared this church as the pilgrim shrine in 1917.

== Religious institutions ==
Marthoma Centre, Aloor; BLM retreat Centre, Aloor; PACS Kallettumakara; Thiruhridaya Seminaru, Aloor; Shoenstatt Seminary, Aloor; and Kalvari Franciscan Ashram are the other Christian institutions in panchayath territory. The tomb of Blessed Mariam Thressia at Kuzhikkattussery is just one kilometre away from panchayath territory. In the early half of 20th century, a hilly area near Aloor junction was donated to Fr. Andrews Malamel by some members of the community for charity purposes, and later used as summer residences of the Bishop of Thrissur. Fr. Jose Akkarakkaran built a chapel dedicated to Our Lady of Grace in 1968. This centre was later developed as the Better Life Movement, Aloor and Prasadavaranatha Parish, Aloor, and so on. The first complete Bible in Malayalam by Fr. Thomas Moothedan was printed from BLM Press, Aloor. Kerala Sabha, the official monthly magazine of the eparchy of Irinjalakuda, is also printed and published here.

St. Mary's rosary church, Karoor (1905), Fatima matha church, Vellanchira (1953), Our Lady of Grace Church, Thuruthipparambu (1966) & Blessed Mariam Thressia filial church, Sholayar (2006) are the other churches in Aloor village. Mary Immaculate Church, Kuzhikkattussery (1904), St. Alphonsa church, Vallakkunnu (2008), St. Antony's filial church, Thazhekkad south (2006), and St. Mary's filial Church, Kannikkara (2006) are located in Aloor panchayath area. Now these 11 parishes and 4 filial churches of the St Thomas Christians in Aloor panchayath fall under the Syro Malabar Catholic eparchy of Irinjalakuda.

== Notable people ==
=== Parish Priests ===
1. Mar Joseph Irimpan, Bishop of Palghat (1974–1994), former vicar (1968–1971)
2. Mar Paul Chittilapilly, Bishop of Kalyan (1988–97), Bishop of Thamarassery (1997–2010), Former Asst. vicar (1966)
3. Mar Stephen Chirapanath, Apostolic Visitator to Europe (2016–present) former Asst. vicar (1988)
4. Fr. Dr. Vincent Alappat, President Paurastya Vidyapitham, Assistant Parish Priest (1978–1979)
5. Mar Sebastian Joby Pozholiparambil, Bishop, Eparchy of Hosur, Assistant parish priest (1982)

=== Parishioners ===
1. V K Joseph master, Ex MLA
2. A C Rappai master, Editor, Gramadhwani
3. M P Rappai master, former president, Aloor Panchayath
