= Machad Mamangam =

Malayalees temple festival in India

Coordinates: 10°38′08.9″N 76°15′35.3″E

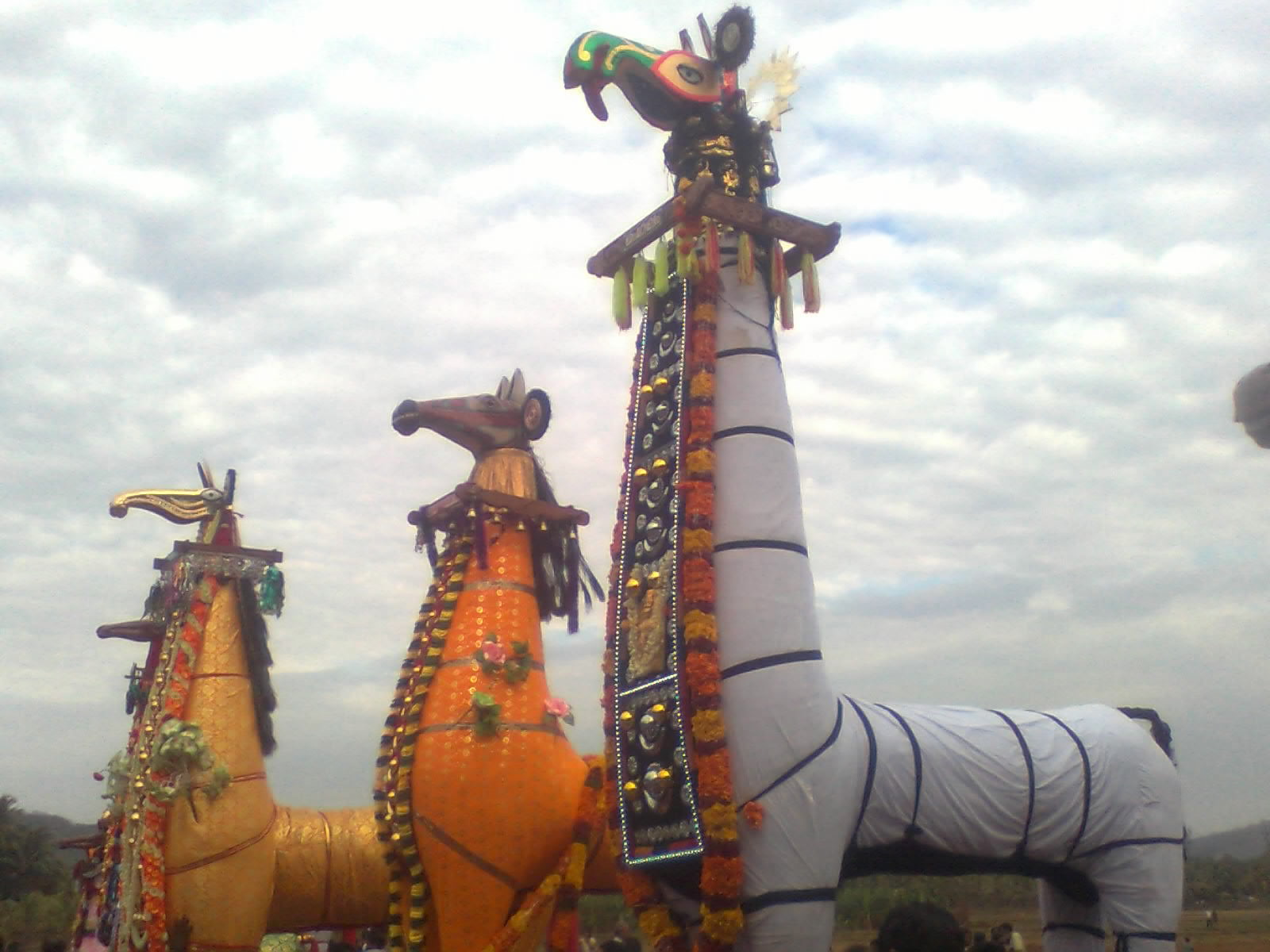
- Wooden horses of Mamangam
- Official name: Machad Mamangam
- Observed by: Malayalees esp. Hindus
- Type: Temple Festival
- Observances: Temple Festival
- Date: Begins on first Friday of the month Kumbham (February). Festival with wooden horse (Kuthira vela) is on the coming Tuesday after first Friday. Ends on the next day.

Machad Mamangam (Malayalam: മച്ചാട് മാമാങ്കം) also known as Machad Kuthira Vela or Thiruvanikkavu Kuthira vela is a temple festival celebrated at Thiruvanikkavu temple near Wadakkancherry in Thrissur District. The festival is organised by five desams (Villages) in a competitive way. Karumathra, Viruppakka, Mangalam, Parlikadu and Manalithara are the 5 main participants of the festival. Thekkumkara, Punnamparambu, and Panangattukara are desams who take initiative in conducting pooram once in every three years. The festival starts with a parapurappadu on first Friday of Kumbham according to Malayalam calendar. On the coming Tuesday the real festival vela is celebrated with wooden horses made by different desams.

According to the legend the king of ruling that area wished to conduct the festival by live horses as a competition towards the elephant festival Uthralikkavu Pooram, but due to the lack of horses in Kerala and inability to domesticate horses he abandoned that wish and started celebrating with artificial horses.
