= Veerolipadam =

Veerolipadam Veerolipadam, kerala machad
- Village
- Location in Kerala, India Veerolipadam (India)
- Coordinates: 10°37′18.4″N 76°17′23.1″E
- Country: India
- State: Kerala
- District: Thrissur

Government
  - Type: Yes
  - Body: Panchayath

Population
  - Total: 500+

Languages
  - Official: Malayalam, English
- Time zone: UTC+5:30 (IST)
- PIN: 680589
- Vehicle registration: KL-8, KL-48
- Nearest city: Wadakanchery
- Lok Sabha constituency: alathur
- Vidhan Sabha constituency: wadakkanchery

Veerolipadam is a village in Thrissur district of Kerala, India. It is located in Thekkumkara Gram Panchayath.
