= Pidikkaparambu =

- Village
- Location in Kerala, India Pidikkaparambu (India)
- Coordinates: 10°26′2″N 76°14′44″E
- Country: India
- State: Kerala
- District: Thrissur

Languages
  - Official: Malayalam, English
- Time zone: UTC+5:30 (IST)
- PIN: 680562
- Telephone code: 0487
- Vehicle registration: KL-8
- Nearest city: Thrissur
- Literacy: 83%%

Pidikkaparambu is a very small area that comes under the Vallachira Panchayat and is famous for the Pidikkaparambu Lord Shiva temple located here.

== Festivals ==
The Pidikkaparambu Pooram is held here and is accompanied with "Anayottam - Tusker Race/Jumbo Rally" that takes place in the Paddy fields located nearby. This festival takes place in the month of March or April every year. It usually lasts for 2 –3 days.

== Terrain ==
This area has Paddy fields, coconut plantations, and a large supply of fresh water.

There is a well maintained blacktop road that can take one all the way to "Chathakudam Centre" which has a few grocery and stationery Stores, a couple of cafeterias, a post office, and a Gent's Saloon. The State Bank of India - Vallachira Branch is also located nearby.

== Schools ==
The closest school (Kerala Govt) would be Vallachira UP School and Kadalassery LP School.

== Transportation ==
There are no public transport systems that are servicing Pidikkaparambu currently. However, there are privately managed bus services from Chathakudam centre to Thrissur every day from dawn till dusk. Private auto rickshaws and Taxis could be hired from Chatakudam centre mostly during the weekdays.
