= Pallur =

Pallur refers to the following places:

- Pallur, Thrissur, a village in Thrissur district, Kerala, India]
- Pallur, Vellore district, Tamil Nadu, India
- Pallur, Anantapur district, Andhra Pradesh, India
- Palloor, a village in Mahe district, Puducherry, India
