= Parekkattukara =

- village
- Interactive map of Parekkattukara
- Coordinates: 10.33°N 76.23°E
- Country: India
- State: Kerala
- District: Thrissur
- Established: 1936

Government
  - Type: Village
  - Body: Grama Panchayath

Area
  - Total: 8.2 km^{2} (3.2 sq mi)

Languages
  - Official: Malayalam
- Time zone: UTC+5:30 (IST)
- PIN: 680683
- Telephone code: 0480
- Vehicle registration: KL-45
- Nearest City: Thrissur
- Lok Sabha constituency: Thrissur

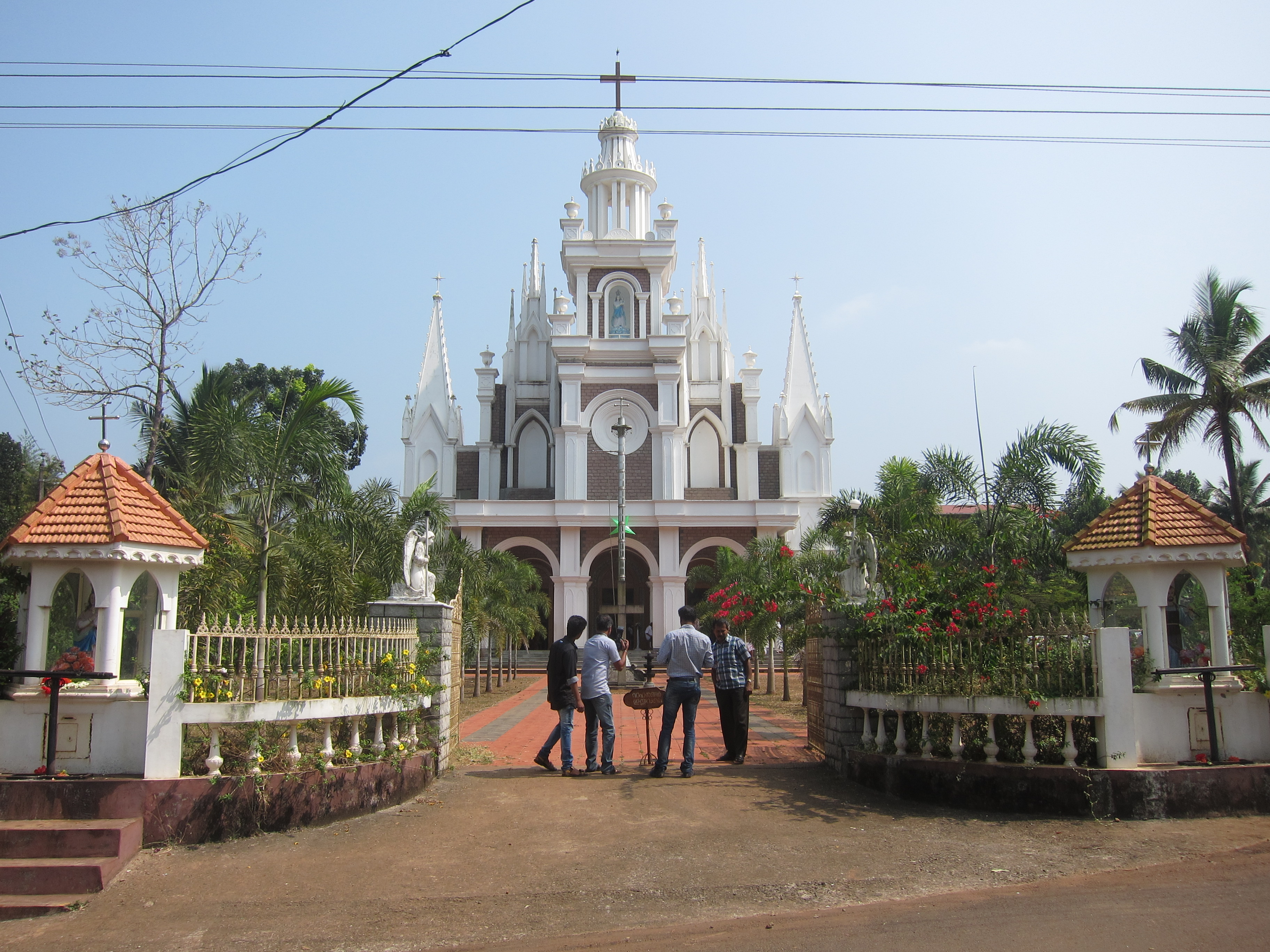
Parekkattukara Church

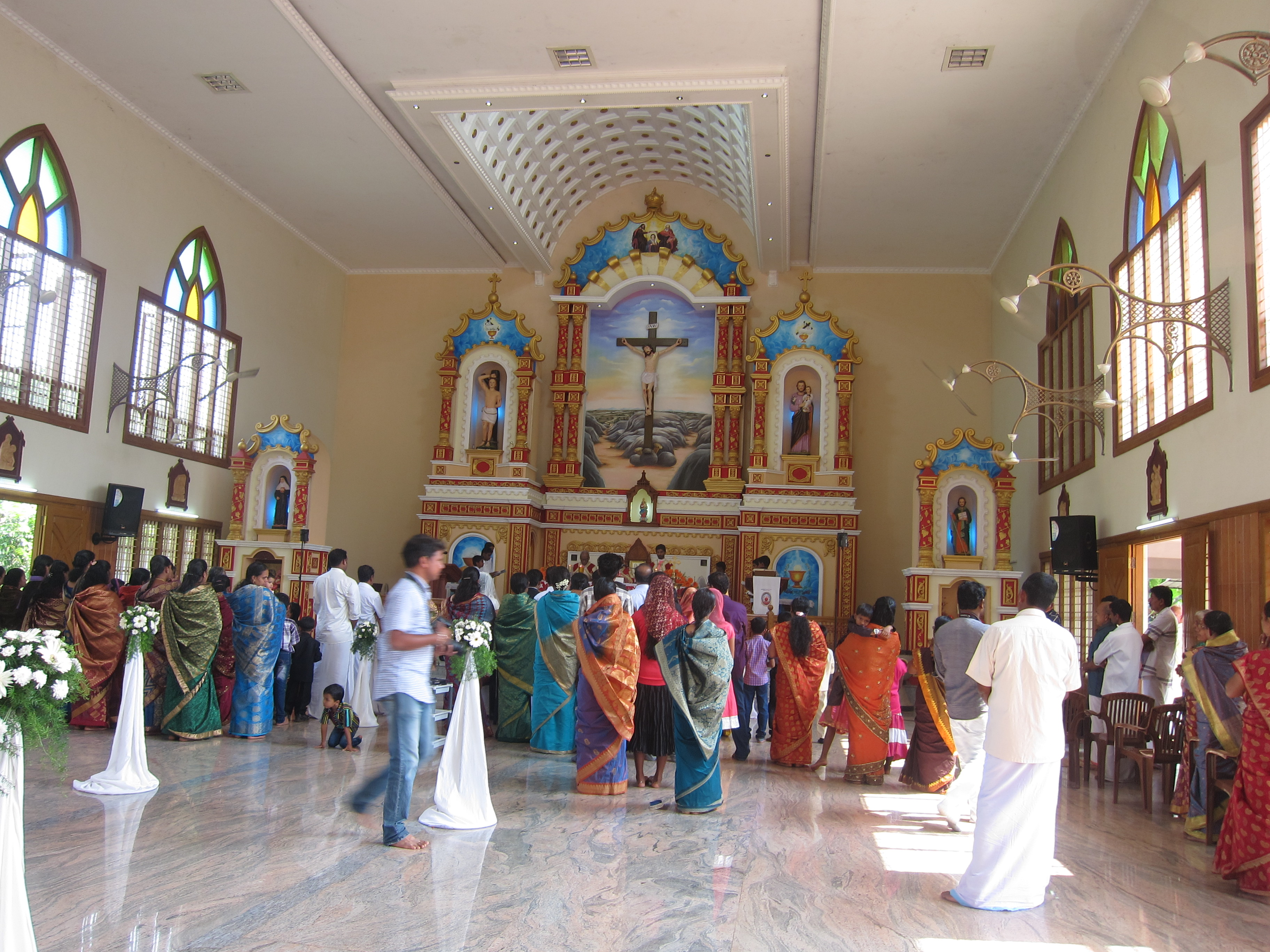
Inside the church

Parekkattukara is a small village in Thrissur district, Kerala, India, with a population of around 1,000 families. It is surrounded by other villages such as Kallettumkara, Muriyad, Karoor, Alathur, Manakulangara, and Tharayilakadu. It is part of Muriyad revenue village. The nearest towns are Kodakara, Irinjalakuda, and Chalakkudy.

== Demographics ==
The population contains 40% Hindus and 60% Christians. One or two members from 50% of families are in away from the village, working in foreign countries. The people of Parekkattukara are well educated; the average education of those under 50 years of age is 12th standard.

== Facilities ==
The village is a residential area and there is a LP school, Engineering College, chicken stalls, Beef stalls, vegetable/grocery stores, bank and bakeries.

== Climate ==
The climate is relatively cool and is situated just 3.5 km to NH47. The nearest railway station is just 4 km ahead. All express & passenger trains have stop at this railway station except Super-Fast Trains.

== Churches ==
There is a church by the name of "St. Marys" that was established in the year 1941 under the Diocese of Thrissur. Renovation of church completed in the year 2012 under Diocese of Irinjalakuda. The major game here is Volleyball, Football and Cricket.

== Schools ==
Nearby Schools St. Marys L.P School Parekkattukara, Govt. U.P School Muriyad, Govt.U.P School Alathur, Sreekrishna Higher secondary School Anandapuram.

== Colleges ==
Nearby Colleges Sahrdaya Engineering College (200 meter) Sahrdaya College Of Education (2 km)

== See also ==
- List of villages in Thrissur district
