= Nooluvally =

Nooluvally Nooluvalli
- village
- Location in Kerala, India Nooluvally (India)
- Coordinates: 10°23′47″N 76°21′20″E
- Country: India
- State: Kerala
- District: Thrissur

Languages
  - Official: Malayalam, English
- Time zone: UTC+5:30 (IST)
- PIN: 680684
- Vehicle registration: KL-
- Coastline: 0 kilometres (0 mi)
- Nearest city: Kodakara

Nooluvally, also known as Nooluvalli, is a village in Thrissur District in Kerala. It is a ward within the Mattathur Grama Panchayat.

In 2016, a group of Nooluvally residents started cultivating organic Navara rice.
