= Puthuruthy =

- village
- Country: India
- State: Kerala
- District: Thrissur
- Talukas: Talappilly

Languages
  - Official: Malayalam, English
- Time zone: UTC+5:30 (IST)
- PIN: 680623
- Vehicle registration: KL-

Puthuruthy is a village in Thrissur district in the state of Kerala, India.
