= Kanipayyur =

Kanippayyur
- Village
- Location in Kerala, India Kanippayyur (India)
- Coordinates: 10°37′0″N 76°5′0″E
- Country: India
- State: Kerala
- District: Thrissur
- Talukas: Talappilly

Government
  - Type: Panchayati Raj (India)
  - Body: Gram Panchayat

Languages
  - Official: Malayalam, English
- Time zone: UTC+5:30 (IST)
- PIN: 680517
- Vehicle registration: KL-46
- Nearest city: Kunnamkulam

Kanippayyur is a village, near Kunnamkulam in Thrissur district in the state of Kerala, India.

Kanippayyur is prominent in the practice of Traditional Architecture, Temple Building, Astrology and related studies. At the onset of twentieth century, Kanippayyur Shankaran Namboodiripad – one of the famous practitioners of the Architectural Science – popularized and rejuvenated Vaastu Shastra.
