= Chaipankuzhy =

- Village
- Country: India
- District: Thrissur
- State: Kerala

Chaipankuzhy is a village in Thrissur district, Kerala, India. It is located 16 km (9.9 mi) from Chalakudy town and 10 km (6.2 mi) from Athirapilli waterfall. It is in Mukundapuram Taluk, which is in the Chalakudy block.

Chaipankuzhy's government high school is Chaipankuzhy HSS.
