= Chembuthara =

Chembuthara Chembutra
- village
- Location in Kerala, India Chembuthara (India)
- Coordinates: 10°33′0″N 76°20′0″E
- Country: India
- State: Kerala
- District: Thrissur

Languages
  - Official: Malayalam, English
- Time zone: UTC+5:30 (IST)
- PIN: 680652
- Telephone code: 0487
- Vehicle registration: KL-08
- Coastline: 0 kilometres (0 mi)
- Nearest city: Thrissur
- Literacy: 100%
- Lok Sabha constituency: Thrissur
- Climate: Tropical monsoon (Köppen)
- Avg. summer temperature: 35 °C (95 °F)
- Avg. winter temperature: 20 °C (68 °F)

Chembuthara or Chembutra is a small village in Kerala, India, known for its Makarachowa festival. It is situated about 11 km away from Thrissur center. It is located by the side of NH 544.

== Temples ==
Chembuthara Kodungallurkavu temple is located just 500m away from the NH and its owned by the Chembuthara Kodugallorekavu Devaswam' managed by Ezhavas. Thousands of devotees visit this temple monthly.

== Festivals ==
Chembuthara 'Makarachowa' is a parade of elephants with percussion music and fire works. Every year on the first Tuesday of Malayalam month 'Makaram', the Makarachowa festival is celebrated. The Makarachowa festival is accompanied by about 40-50 elephants and pancharimelam. Besides Bhagavathy's birthday is celebrated with 4-5 elephants and prasaada oottu (holy food) on meena maasam.

== Tourism ==
Local tourist spots include Pattathipaara, a natural waterfall. Also nearby is Pattikkad which is one of the developed village Panchayath in Thrissur district. A higher secondary school and clinic is situated Pattikkad. In between Pattikkad and Chembuthara, Peechi Road is located. Peechi Road is the turning to Peechi Dam, KFRI etc.

Also, there is a Sree Krishna temple called 'Sree Krishna Temple Chembuthara'. It is owned by the Vadakkedesam Pooracommitee. Tens of hundreds of devotees visits this temple yearly. Festivals held within this temple include sree Krishna jayanthi and prathishtadinam.

The house of St. Mary (Vishudha Maraiam Veedu), a home for the homeless and St. Joseph Chapel are just behind an Indian coffee house at Chembuthara on HWY 544. It runs an ambulance service - free of cost for the poor. Every Saturday there is holy Mass at 0730 AM. The house of St. Mary runs a free community kitchen. From 1200 to 0200 PM, free food is provided for all who come there.

== Education ==
- Sree Badhra Vidya Mandhir, Chembuthara

== Notable people ==
- Vishnu Raj Menon

== See also ==
- Pattikkad, Thrissur
- Thrissur
- Thrissur District
