= Thrithallur =

Thrithallur Thrithallur
- Village
- Location in Kerala, India Thrithallur (India)
- Coordinates: 10.29°N 76.4°E
- Country: India
- State: Kerala
- District: Thrissur

Government
  - Body: തൃത്തല്ലൂർ

Languages
  - Official: Malayalam, English
- Time zone: UTC+5:30 (IST)
- PIN: 680619
- Civic agency: തൃത്തല്ലൂർ

Thrithallur is a village in Thrissur district, Kerala, which is a state of India. Thrithallur is located on the western part of [Thrissur] district. The National Highway 17 passes through the middle of this village. Engandiyur and Vatanappally are nearest panchayats of Thrithallur. Thrithallur is famous for its Shiva Temple and Cultural activities. It is called as cultural capital of Nattika Manappuram.There are three schools in this village namely Sreevidhyaposhini L.P School, Thrithalloor U.P School and Kamala Nehru Memorial Vocational Higher Secondary School. Late Prime Minister, Indira Gandhi laid foundation stone for the school in this village Kamla Nehru Memorial Vocational Higher secondary school.

== Schools ==
Kamla Nehru Memorial Vocational Higher Secondary School
Armour Special School
