= Nelluwaya =

Nelluvai
- Village
- Location in Kerala, India Nelluvai (India)
- Coordinates: 10°40′50″N 76°10′33″E
- Country: India
- State: Kerala
- District: Thrissur

Population (2011)
  - Total: 5,994

Languages
  - Official: Malayalam
- Time zone: UTC+5:30 (IST)
- PIN: 680584
- Vehicle registration: KL-8, KL - 48
- Nearest city: Thrissur

Nelluvai is a small village in the Thrissur district, Kerala, India. It is located between the towns Thrissur and Guruvayur, Kunnamkulam, and is known for the temple of Lord Dhanvantari. It comes under Erumapetty Panchayath. It belongs to the central Kerala Division. It is located 21 km north from District headquarters Thrissur, 12 km from Wadakkanchery, and 303 km from the state capital Thiruvananthapuram. Nelluvai's pin code is 680584 and postal head office is Erumapetty. Nelluvai is surrounded by Mangad village to the east, Kuttanchery village to the north, Muringatheri Village towards the north and Erumapetty village towards the west. Kunnamkulam, Shoranur, Thrissur, and Wadakkancheri are the nearby cities.

== Demographics ==
As of 2011 India census, Nelluwaya had a population of 5994 with 2849 males and 3145 females.
