= Aripalam =

Village in Kerala, India

- Location in Kerala, India
- Coordinates: 10.30°N 76.19°E
- Country: India
- State: Kerala
- District: Thrissur

Government
  - Body: Panchayathu
- Elevation: 36 m (118 ft)

Languages
  - Official: Malayalam, English
- Time zone: UTC+5:30 (IST)
- PIN: 680688
- Telephone code: 0480
- Vehicle registration: KL-45

Aripalam is a village situated in Thrissur district, Kerala, India. Nearest towns are Irinjalakuda and Kodungallore. Main highlight of the village is it is a place between two main roads they are Thrissur - Kodungallur SH22 and Panvel - Edappally Road to connecting NH17 - NH47.

== History ==
In the last decade of the 18th Century the last Naduvazhi Nambiar of Mukundapuram Nadu died and Sakthan Thampuran, the Ruler of Kochi formed Mukundapuram taluk by adding Mapranam nadu and Nandilathu nadu to Mukundapuram nadu (Muriya nadu). Sakthan Thampuran divided old Mukundapuram nadu into three properties viz.1) Aripalam 2)Thazhekkad, 3)Mukundapuram and formed old Mapranam nadu into a single Mapranam Proverty(Kattungachira, Karalam, Porathussery & Madayikkonam) for administrative and revenue purposes . Before the arrival of Tipu Sulthan to Mukundapuram nadu in December 1789 the headquarters of Padruado Archbishops of Cranganore(Kodungallur)of Syro-Malabar Christians (Nazranis) was at Aripalam (Pookkott) of Mukkundapuram Nadu. A certain group of people with Portuguese ancestry, named Anglo-Indians lives here. A number of factors fostered a strong sense of community among Anglo-Indians. Their cuisine, dress, speech, Anglo-centric culture, etc. segregate them from the native population.

== Religion ==
Christians and Hindus live in Aripalam.

== Transportation ==
=== Road ===
Aripalam is located near major two cities: Thrissur is approximately 30 km and Ernakulam approximately 45 km from the village, and provide links to major national highways NH 47 and NH 17 in the State. Two main roads are nearby: State Highway 22 (Kerala) (Kodungallur-Shornur)onlyconnects via a 3 km road and State Highway 61 (Kerala) (Potta-Moonupeedika) is 6 km distance.

=== Railways ===
The nearest railway station is the Irinjalakuda Railway Station which is about 15 km East of the town at Kallettumkara. Irinjalakuda Railway Station is managed by the Southern Railways of Indian Railways.

=== Air ===
The nearest airport is the Cochin International Airport at Nedumbassery, which is 42 km away. The airport is well connected to all major airports in India and also connected to many foreign cities. Direct flights are available to Chennai, New Delhi, Mumbai, Bangalore and Kolkata.
