= Manakkody =

- village
- Location in Kerala, India Manakkody (India)
- Coordinates: 10°30′0″N 76°10′0″E
- Country: India
- State: Kerala
- District: Thrissur

Population (2001)
  - Total: 5,527

Languages
  - Official: Malayalam, English
- Time zone: UTC+5:30 (IST)
- PIN: 680012
- Vehicle registration: KL-08

Manakkody is a village in Thrissur district in the state of Kerala, India. It is known for the paddy fields which extend from Manakody to Pullu.

== Demographics ==
As of 2011 India census, Manakkody had a population of 7,150 with 3,484 males and 3,666 females.
