= Kurumala =

- village
- Location in Kerala, India Kurumala (India)
- Coordinates: 10°40′30″N 76°20′20″E
- Country: India
- State: Kerala
- District: Thrissur
- Taluks: Thalappilly

Languages
  - Official: Malayalam, English
- Time zone: UTC+5:30 (IST)
- PIN: 680586
- Vehicle registration: KL-8
- Kurumala is a small village in Trissur district.It belongs to Chelakara gram panchayat.The neighbouring villages to it are Pangarappilly, Thonoorkara, and Venganallur. Variety of physical features and some of Keralian beauty could be noted over here. The main occasion which is observed is this village's participation in the popular Anthimahakalan kavu vela.

Kurumala is a village in Thrissur district in the state of Kerala, India.
