= Pilakkad =

Coordinates: 8°52′N 76°42′E

- village
- Interactive map of Pilakkad
- Country: India
- State: Kerala
- District: Thrissur
- Talukas: Talappilly

Languages
  - Official: Malayalam, English
- Time zone: UTC+5:30 (IST)
- PIN: 6XXXXX
- Vehicle registration: KL-

Pilakkad is a village in Thrissur district in the state of Kerala, India.
