= Irimbranallur =

- village
- Location in Kerala, India Irimbranallur (India)
- Coordinates: 10°31′0″N 76°6′0″E
- Country: India
- State: Kerala
- District: Thrissur
- Talukas: Chavakkad

Government
  - Type: Panchayati raj (India)
  - Body: Gram panchayat

Languages
  - Official: Malayalam, English
- Time zone: UTC+5:30 (IST)
- PIN: 6XXXXX
- Vehicle registration: KL-

Irimbranallur is a village in Thrissur district in the state of Kerala, India. It covers an area of 6.46 square kilometres (2.49 sq mi) and has population of 3,200 (2011 census: males 1,406, females 1,794). There are about 784 houses in the village.

Irimbranallur is situated 12 kilometres (7.5 mi) from the sub-district headquarters Chavakkad tehsil and 20 kilometres (12 mi) from the district headquarters Thrissur. Venkitangu is the gram panchayat of Irimbranallur village according to 2009 statistics.
