= Amballur, Thrissur =

Village in Thrissur District, Kerala, India

Coordinates: 10.4194°N 76.2653°E

Amballur is a village near Pudukkad town in Thrissur district in Kerala, India.
