= Thonnurkara =

Coordinates: 10°41′N 76°19′E

- village
- Interactive map of Thonnurkara
- Country: India
- State: Kerala
- District: Thrissur

Population (2011)
  - Total: 6,799

Languages
  - Official: Malayalam, English
- Time zone: UTC+5:30 (IST)
- PIN: 6XXXXX
- Vehicle registration: KL-

Thonnurkara is a village in Thrissur district in the state of Kerala, India.

== Demographics ==
As of 2011 India census, Thonnurkara had a population of 6799 with 3214 males and 3585 females.
