= Paralam =

- village
- Location in Kerala, India Paralam (India)
- Coordinates: 10.4594000°N 76.194820°E
- Country: India
- State: Kerala
- District: Thrissur

Population (2011)
  - Total: 9,187

Languages
  - Official: Malayalam, English
- Time zone: UTC+5:30 (IST)
- PIN: 6805xx
- Vehicle registration: KL-08-xx-xxxx

Paralam is a village in Thrissur district in the state of Kerala, India.

== Demographics ==
As of 2011 India census, Paralam had a population of 9187 with 4498 males and 4689 females.
