= Thangalur =

- village
- Location in Kerala, India Thangalur (India)
- Coordinates: 10.624578°N 76.186146°E
- Country: India
- State: Kerala
- District: Thrissur

Population (2011)
  - Total: 4,587

Languages
  - Official: Malayalam, English
- Time zone: UTC+5:30 (IST)
- PIN: 6XXXXX
- Vehicle registration: KL-

Thangalur is a village in Thrissur district in the state of Kerala, India.

== Demographics ==
As of 2011 India census, Thangalur had a population of 4587 with 2248 males and 2339 females.
