= Chengallur =

- town
- Location in Kerala, India
- Coordinates: 8°29′0″N 76°58′0″E
- Country: India
- State: Kerala
- District: Thiruvananthapuram

Languages
  - Official: Malayalam, English
- Time zone: UTC+5:30 (IST)
- Telephone code: 0471
- Vehicle registration: KL-01
- Coastline: 0 kilometres (0 mi)
- Climate: Tropical monsoon (Köppen)
- Avg. summer temperature: 35 °C (95 °F)
- Avg. winter temperature: 20 °C (68 °F)

Chengallur is a place near Poojappura, Trivandrum, Kerala, India, where the famous Chengallur Shiva temple is located. The temple is dedicated to Lord Shiva. This temple is also famous for its subhramania deity and also the theekavadi (fire benefaction), an act of walking through fire as a proof of making reverent petition to God.

Chengallur is the home of famous Malayalam personalities M Jayachandran, renowned music director, and Prithviraj, actor and producer.
