= Kochanoor =

- town
- Location in Kerala, India Kochanoor (India)
- Coordinates: 10°39′0″N 76°1′0″E
- Country: India
- State: Kerala
- District: Thrissur

Languages
  - Official: Malayalam, English
- Time zone: UTC+5:30 (IST)
- PIN: 679562
- Telephone code: 0487 (Punnayoorkulam )
- Vehicle registration: KL-46
- Coastline: 0 kilometres (0 mi)
- Nearest city: Kunnamkulam is 8 Km away east and Guruvayoor 8Km away south
- Lok Sabha constituency: Thrissur
- Climate: Tropical monsoon (Köppen)
- Avg. summer temperature: 35 °C (95 °F)
- Avg. winter temperature: 20 °C (68 °F)

Kochanoor is a village in the Thrissur district of Kerala, South India, India. It is situated near the village of Vadakkekad. Before Indian independence, Kochanoor was on the border of the former provinces of Malabar and Thirukochi. It has around 3 thousand of population which contains 80% Muslims and 20% Hindus.

== Transport ==
- The nearest railway station is at Guruvayoor.
- Cochin International Airport is 82 kilometers (51 mi) away.
- Calicut International Airport is 82 kilometers (51 mi) away.

Nearest town is Kunnamkulam 7 km (4.3 mi) away and District Head Quarters Thrissur is 30 km (19 mi) away.
