= Karamuck =

- village
- Location in Kerala, India Karamuck (India)
- Coordinates: 10°28′0″N 76°6′0″E
- Country: India
- State: Kerala
- District: Thrissur

Population (2011)
  - Total: 15,129

Languages
  - Official: Malayalam, English
- Time zone: UTC+5:30 (IST)
- PIN: 6XXXXX
- Vehicle registration: KL-

Karamuck is a village in Thrissur district in the state of Kerala, India.

== Demographics ==
As of 2011 India census, Karamuck had a population of 15129 with 7055 males and 8074 females.
