= Kottanellur =

- village
- Location in Kerala, India Kottanellur (India)
- Coordinates: 10°17′45″N 76°14′35″E
- Country: India
- State: Kerala
- District: Thrissur

Population (2011)
  - Total: 11,133

Languages
  - Official: Malayalam, English
- Time zone: UTC+5:30 (IST)
- PIN: 680662
- Telephone code: 0480
- Vehicle registration: KL-45
- Nearest city: Irinjalakuda

Kottanellur is a village in Mukundapuram taluk, Thrissur district in the state of Kerala, India.

== Demographics ==
As of 2011 India census, Kottanellur had a population of 11133 with 5182 males and 5951 females.
