= Mangad =

- village
- Location in Kerala, India Mangad (India)
- Coordinates: 10°40′45″N 76°11′10″E
- Country: India
- State: Kerala
- District: Thrissur
- Talukas: Talappilly

Government
  - Type: Panchayati raj (India)
  - Body: Gram panchayat

Languages
  - Official: Malayalam, English
- Time zone: UTC+5:30 (IST)
- PIN: 6XXXXX
- ISO 3166 code: IN-KL
- Vehicle registration: KL-
- Nearest city: Wadakanchery
- Lok Sabha constituency: Alathur
- Vidhan Sabha constituency: kunnamkulam

Mangad is a village in Kasaragod district in the state of Kerala, India.There are others places called Mangad in Thrissur, Kannur and Kollam.

The literacy rate stands at 96.48%, with male literacy at 97.86% and female literacy at 95.31%.
