= Chendrappini =

- village
- Location in Kerala, India Chendrappini (India)
- Coordinates: 10.3554600°N 76.128090°E
- Country: India
- State: Kerala
- District: Thrissur

Government
  - Body: Edathiruthy Grama Panchayath

Population (2011)
  - Total: 16,404

Languages
  - Official: Malayalam, English
- Time zone: UTC+5:30 (IST)
- PIN: 680687
- Vehicle registration: KL-

Chendrappini is a village in Thrissur district in the state of Kerala, India. It is in Kodungallur taluk.There is a hospital named Al-iqbal. SN Vidyabhavan, a CBSE School is functioning there.

== Demographics ==
As of 2011 India census, Chendrappini had a population of 16404 with 7422 males and 8982 females.
