= Thanniyam =

- village
- Location in Kerala, India Thanniyam (India)
- Coordinates: 10°25′0″N 76°8′0″E
- Country: India
- State: Kerala
- District: Thrissur

Population (2011)
  - Total: 9,743

Languages
  - Official: Malayalam, English
- Time zone: UTC+5:30 (IST)
- PIN: 680565
- Vehicle registration: KL-08/75

Thanniyam is a village in Thrissur district in the state of Kerala, India.

== Demographics ==
As of 2011 India census, Thanniyam had a population of 9,743 with 4,430 males and 5,313 females.
