= Minalur =

- Village
- Location in Kerala, India Minalur (India)
- Coordinates: 10°37′30″N 76°13′0″E
- Country: India
- State: Kerala
- District: Thrissur

Government
  - Body: Wadakkanchery Municipality

Population (2011)
  - Total: 6,120

Languages
  - Official: Malayalam, English
- Time zone: UTC+5:30 (IST)
- PIN: 680581
- Vehicle registration: KL-48
- Nearest city: Thrissur (12km)
- Lok Sabha constituency: Alathur (SC)
- Vidhan Sabha constituency: Wadakkanchery
- Civic agency: Wadakkanchery Municipality

Minalur is a village in Thrissur district in the state of Kerala, India.

== Demographics ==
As of 2011 India census, Minalur had a population of 6120 with 2949 males and 3171 females.
