= Pangarappilly =

- village
- Location in Kerala, India Pangarappilly (India)
- Coordinates: 10.649720°N 76.3483100°E
- Country: India
- State: Kerala
- District: Thrissur

Population (2011)
  - Total: 5,467

Languages
  - Official: Malayalam, English
- Time zone: UTC+5:30 (IST)
- PIN: 680586
- Vehicle registration: KL-

Pangarappilly is a village in Thrissur district in the state of Kerala, India.

== Demographics ==
As of 2011 India census, Pangarappilly had a population of 5467 with 2598 males and 2869 females.
