= Padinjare Vemballur =

- village
- Location in Kerala, India Padinjare Vemballur (India)
- Coordinates: 10.2661100°N 76.146050°E
- Country: India
- State: Kerala
- District: Thrissur

Population (2011)
  - Total: 11,836

Languages
  - Official: Malayalam, English
- Time zone: UTC+5:30 (IST)
- PIN: 680 671
- Vehicle registration: KL-

Padinjare Vemballur is a coastal village in Thrissur district in the state of Kerala, India.

== Demographics ==
As of 2011 India census, Padinjare Vemballur had a population of 11836 with 5556 males and 6280 females.

== Geography ==
It is a coastal village situated in middle of southern state Kerala of India. It is by the West Arabian Sea and is locked with neighbouring villages.

Its plain terrain consists of land, agricultural fields and ponds. Small interconnected streams within 1 km radium near to the sea carry water in rainy season and can be manually opened and closed to remove water logged on terrain.

== Major Institutions ==
1. MES Asmabi College
2. MES HSS P.Vemballur
3. MES Public School
4. MES UP School
5. GFLPS Vekkode(Vekkod Fishery School)
6. GLPS P. Vemballur
7. Sri Sai Vidya Bhavan
