= Kundazhiyur =

- village
- Country: India
- State: Kerala
- District: Thrissur

Population (2011)
  - Total: 10,583

Languages
  - Official: Malayalam, English
- Time zone: UTC+5:30 (IST)
- PIN: 6XXXXX
- Vehicle registration: KL-

Kundazhiyur is a village in Thrissur district in the state of Kerala, India.

== Demographics ==
As of 2011 India census, Kundazhiyur had a population of 10583 with 4742 males and 5841 females.
