= Kallur Thekkummuri =

- village
- Interactive map of Kallur Thekkummuri
- Coordinates: 10°13′53″N 76°19′53″E
- Country: India
- State: Kerala
- District: Thrissur

Population (2011)
  - Total: 17,480

Languages
  - Official: Malayalam, English
- Time zone: UTC+5:30 (IST)
- PIN: 6XXXXX
- Vehicle registration: KL-

Kallur Thekkummuri is a village in Thrissur district in the state of Kerala, India.

== Demographics ==
As of 2011 India census, Kallur Thekkummuri had a population of 17480 with 8401 males and 9079 females.
