= Koolimuttam =

- village
- Location in Kerala, India Koolimuttam (India)
- Coordinates: 10°17′0″N 76°7′0″E
- Country: India
- State: Kerala
- District: Thrissur

Population (2011)
  - Total: 12,497

Languages
  - Official: Malayalam, English
- Time zone: UTC+5:30 (IST)
- PIN: 680691
- Vehicle registration: KL-

Koolimuttam is a village situated near Kodungallur in Thrissur district in the state of Kerala, India.

== Demographics ==
As of 2011 India census, Koolimuttam had a population of 12497 with 5643 males and 6854 females.

== Economy ==
This village is spanned between Arabian sea and Perumthodu (Big Nallah).The people here are mainly involved in fishing, farming and NRI .

== Temples ==
Killikulangara Snake temple is also situated here. Sree Maniyam Kadu Bagavathy temple which is part of history Cherupalani Subramanya temple Bhajanamadam sri muruga temple, Mandathara Sree Muthappan Bagavathy Temple

== History ==
Historically there was a platform or stage(thattu) situated in the present thattungal play ground, used mainly by the local Muslim community, later this place was called as thattungal. It is high likely the place where the Early Chozha king Killivalavan died. There are two Killivalavans: one died in Kulamutram ( now Koolimuttam) and another died in Kurappalli in Tamil Nadu.

== Suburbs and villages ==
The places in Koolimuttam village are Poklai, Thattungal, Oomanthara, Nedumparambu, Emmadu, Praniyadu, Thriveni, Kathikode and Bhajanamadam beach (Kaithakkadu bhajanamadam beach). Its west border is Arabian sea.

The Koolimuttam Post Office and Village Office is situated in Thattungal.
