= Vadakkumbhagom =

- village
- Location in Kerala, India Vadakkumbhagom (India)
- Coordinates: 10.148691°N 76.415892°E
- Country: India
- State: Kerala
- District: Ernakulam

Population (2011)
  - Total: 11,727

Languages
  - Official: Malayalam, English
- Time zone: UTC+5:30 (IST)

Vadakkumbhagom is a village in Ernakulam district in the Indian state of Kerala.

== Demographics ==
As of 2011 India census, Vadakkumbhagom had a population of 11727 with 5,640 males and 6,087 females.
