= Pullur, Thrissur =

Pullur, Mukundapuram
- village
- Interactive map of Pullur, Mukundapuram
- Country: India
- State: Kerala
- District: Thrissur

Government
  - Type: Panchayati raj (India)
  - Body: Gram panchayat, Municipality

Population (2011)
  - Total: 12,656

Languages
  - Official: Malayalam, English
- Time zone: UTC+5:30 (IST)
- PIN: 680683
- Vehicle registration: KL-45

Pullur is a village in Mukundapuram Taluk in Thrissur district in the state of Kerala, India.

== History ==
It is one of the revenue-survey villages formed out of the old Thazhekkad proverti of Mukundapuram Taluk.

== Demographics ==
As of 2011 India census, Pullur had a population of 12656 with 5923 males and 6733 females.
