= Vadakkummuri =

- village
- Interactive map of Vadakkummuri
- Coordinates: 10.43°N 76.12°E
- Country: India
- State: Kerala
- District: Thrissur

Population (2011)
  - Total: 9,585

Languages
  - Official: Malayalam, English
- Time zone: UTC+5:30 (IST)
- PIN: 6XXXXX
- Vehicle registration: KL-

Vadakkummuri is a village in Thrissur district in the state of Kerala, India.

== Demographics ==
As of 2011 India census, Vadakkummuri had a population of 9585 with 4280 males and 5305 females.
