= Karumathara =

Coordinates: 10°39′N 76°16′E

- village
- Interactive map of Karumathara
- Country: India
- State: Kerala
- District: Thrissur
- Talukas: Talappilly

Languages
  - Official: Malayalam, English
- Time zone: UTC+5:30 (IST)
- PIN: 6XXXXX
- Vehicle registration: KL-

Karumathara is a village in Thrissur district in the state of Kerala, India.
