= Chalakkal =

Chalakkal ചാലക്കൽ
- village
- Location in Kerala, India Chalakkal (India)
- Coordinates: 10.114113°N 76.398675°E
- Country: India
- State: Kerala
- District: Ernakulam
- Talukas: Ernakulam

Government
  - Type: Panchayati raj (India)
  - Body: Gram panchayat

Languages
  - Official: Malayalam, English
- Time zone: UTC+5:30 (IST)
- PIN: 683105
- Vehicle registration: KL-41

Chalakkal is a village in Ernakulam district in the state of Kerala, India. Chalakkal is situated at a distance of seven kilometres from Aluva, one of the prominent urban centres in the Ernakulam district. Geographically positioned on the riparian banks of the Periyar River, Chalakkal constitutes a scenic rural settlement.
