= Inchamudi =

- village
- Location in Kerala, India Inchamudi (India)
- Coordinates: 10°24′0″N 76°10′0″E
- Country: India
- State: Kerala
- District: Thrissur
- Talukas: Thrissur

Government
  - Type: Panchayati raj (India)
  - Body: Gram panchayat

Languages
  - Official: Malayalam, English
- Time zone: UTC+5:30 (IST)
- PIN: 680564
- Vehicle registration: KL-08

Inchamudi is a village in Thrissur district in the state of Kerala, India.
