= Kurichikkara =

- village
- Location in Kerala, India Kurichikkara (India)
- Coordinates: 10°34′0″N 76°15′0″E
- Country: India
- State: Kerala
- District: Thrissur

Population (2011)
  - Total: 4,081

Languages
  - Official: Malayalam, English
- Time zone: UTC+5:30 (IST)
- PIN: 6XXXXX
- Vehicle registration: KL-

Kurichikkara is a village in Thrissur district in the state of Kerala, India.

== Demographics ==
As of 2011 India census, Kurichikkara had a population of 4081 with 1993 males and 2088 females.
