= Mulayam =

- Village
- Location in Kerala Location in India
- Coordinates: 10°31′0″N 76°17′0″E
- Country: India
- State: Kerala
- District: Thrissur

Population (2011)
  - Total: 9,465

Languages
  - Official: Malayalam, English
- Time zone: UTC+5:30 (IST)
- PIN: 680###
- Vehicle registration: KL-8

Mulayam is a village in Thrissur district in the state of Kerala, India.

== Demographics ==
As of 2011 India census, Mulayam had a population of 9465 with 4692 males and 4773 females.

The Rudhiramala Bhagavati Temple is one of the most famous temples of the locality. The temple feast is celebrated across religions. Another famous temple in the region is Panangattukkara Sri Ayyappankavu Temple. It is one of the most ancient temple in the region - it may be 5000 years old.

It was little known to the outside world until 1983, SOS children's villages were established in Mulayam. It is an international non-governmental organisation for children across 134 countries in the world. In 1998, Marymatha Major Seminary, Trichur was established in Mulayam. The seminary has been noted very soon due to its innovative, people-oriented, pastorally sound theology and priestly formation.

The feast of St. Patrick Church, the local parish Church is also celebrated by all religious communities.

== Major institutions ==
- Panangattukara Sri Ayyappankavu Temple
- Damian Leprosy Home
- Sri Lakshmi Narasimhaswami Temple
- Purapadiyam Sri mahavishnu Temple
- Marymatha Major Seminary
- Sree Rudhiramala Bhagavathi Temple
- SOS Children's Village
- SJB House (ConGregation of St John the Baptist)
- Divine Union Vocationary (Vocationist Fathers)
- St. Patrick's Church
- Home of Love
- Don Bosco Central School
- Sree Narayanaguru Mandiram
- Sree Sarani Vanadurga Bhadrakali Temple
