= Vellani =

Vellani is a surname. Notable people with the surname include:

- Aliza Vellani (born 1991), Canadian actor
- Francesco Vellani (1688–1768), Italian painter
- Iman Vellani (born 2002), Canadian actress
- Mario Vellani Marchi (1895–1979), Italian painter and scenic designer

== See also ==
- Villani
