= Kandanissery =

- village
- Location in Kerala, India Kandanissery (India)
- Coordinates: 10°36′0″N 76°4′0″E
- Country: India
- State: Kerala
- District: Thrissur

Languages
  - Official: Malayalam, English
- Time zone: UTC+5:30 (IST)
- Vehicle registration: KL-

Kandanissery is a small village in the Indian state of Kerala.

Guruvayur, a well known Hindu pilgrimage centre, is very near to Kandanissery.

The etymology of 'Kandanissery' is unknown.

== History ==
Human settlement began in this area around bc 1000. The very fertile soil and plenty of water attracted human settlement. Paddy and Coconut were main crops.

We can see the remains of Jaina and Brahmin settlement here. Small caves known as 'munimada' still intact, kudakkallu an old burial site is in the border of kandnaissery. Some old temples are clear evidence of Brahmin settlement. In distant past small group of Brahmins dominate over Ezhavas by political power and money. By some unknown reason's a type of revolution began in Ezhava community and it leads to the crush of the Brahmin settlement. This is a real setback to Brahmins, they are refugees in their own land. They pass some of their properties and Goddess to a Nair family. Thus the ownership of 40% land went to the hand of Nair family. At that time some Ezhava families possess huge area of land. Some other families possess land by giving rent to the Chiralayam Raja family and Choondakathu Othalur Mana. After the retreat of Brahmin's some Ezhava families became exploiters of poor peasants. It ended after the Indian independence, by the bill of 'land reform' by the communist government in Kerala headed by E. M. S. Namboodiripad.
