= Vellattanjur =

- village
- Location in Kerala, India Vellattanjur (India)
- Coordinates: 10.6556300°N 76.1354800°E
- Country: India
- State: Kerala
- District: Thrissur

Government
  - Body: Grama Panchayat

Population (2011)
  - Total: 6,704

Languages
  - Official: Malayalam, English
- Time zone: UTC+5:30 (IST)
- PIN: 680 601
- Telephone code: 04885-
- Vehicle registration: KL-
- Nearest city: Thrissur
- Lok Sabha constituency: Alathur
- Civic agency: Grama Panchayat

Vellatanjur or Vellatanjoor is a small village in the Thrissur, District of Kerala, India on the banks of Kechery river. This village is located 25 km NorthEast of the Thrissur city, 20 km SouthEast of the Kunnamkulam town and 18 km NorthEast of the Guruvayur township where the famous Guruvayur temple is situated.

The main occupation of the people is farming which you can see from the vast paddy fields there. The main religions there are Hinduism & Christianity. Muslims are not found in Vellatanjur due to a curse that the people there believe has been put by Kootumuchikal Amma the Thatakthamma (Local Goddess) when Tippu Sultan ravished the land during his reign.

The village is very quiet and serene due to its location on the bank of the Kechery river.

== Demographics ==
As of 2011 India census, Vellattanjur had a population of 6704 with 3234 males and 3470 females.

== Temples and Church ==
There are 4 major temples in the region. Kootumuchi Temple, Kurooramma Srikrishna Temple, Erakad Subramnaswami Temple & The Sree Rama Temple.

The Annual Pooram celebrated during the month of January–February with elephant processions and Panchavadyam(Temple Band) including firework shows, at the Kootumuchikal Temple.Various cultural events are also conducted by the temple authorities at the same time. The Kurooramma Srikrishna temple is a historical place where Kurooramma lived. The annual festival usually conducted the month of April with Panchavadyam, Annadanam, Bagavatha parayanam etc.

The Shasti Kavadi Attam at Erakad Swami Temple is also celebrated during the month of January–February.

Fathima Matha Church Vellattanjur, the village is famous for its church. The first Fathima Matha Church in India. A Syro Malabar Catholic Church dedicated to Our Lady of Fatima is situated here, which is the first church in India dedicated to Our Lady of Fatima. The feast of Fathima Matha is a grand celebration in the month of October. Also the feast of St.Sebastian is celebrated in month of January. The Church also administrates a dispensary.
