= Kaduppassery =

- village
- Location in Kerala, India Kaduppassery (India)
- Coordinates: 10°19′0″N 76°15′0″E
- Country: India
- State: Kerala
- District: Thrissur

Population (2011)
  - Total: 8,833

Languages
  - Official: Malayalam, English
- Time zone: UTC+5:30 (IST)
- PIN: 6XXXXX
- Vehicle registration: KL-

Kaduppassery is a village in Mukundapuram taluk, Thrissur district in the state of Kerala, India.

== History ==
It is one of the villages formed out of the old Thazhekkad proverti.

== Demographics ==
As of 2011 India census, Kaduppassery had a population of 8833 with 4238 males and 4595 females.
