= Madathumpady =

- village
- Location in Kerala, India Madathumpady (India)
- Coordinates: 10°12′0″N 76°16′0″E
- Country: India
- State: Kerala
- District: Thrissur
- Talukas: Kodungallur

Languages
  - Official: Malayalam, English
- Time zone: UTC+5:30 (IST)
- PIN: 680733
- Vehicle registration: KL 47-

Madathumpady is a village in Thrissur district in the state of Kerala, India. This village consist of 3 wards in Poyya grama panchayat (7,8,9).
