= Killimangalam =

- village
- Location in Kerala, India Killimangalam (India)
- Coordinates: 10°43′0″N 76°21′0″E
- Country: India
- State: Kerala
- District: Thrissur

Government
  - Type: panchayati raj(Indian democracy)
  - Body: panjal panchayat

Population (2011)
  - Total: 9,119

Languages
  - Official: Malayalam, English
- Time zone: UTC+5:30 (IST)
- PIN: 680591
- Telephone code: 04884
- Vehicle registration: KL-48
- Nearest city: Chelakkara, Shoranur

Killimangalam is a village in Chelakkara, Thrissur district in the state of Kerala, India. Killimangalam and the nearby village of panjal has been the location for several Malayalam movies. Vaazhalikkavu temple, which is situated on the banks of nila/bharathapuzha, has been one of these cinematic locations. The Killimangalam Farmers Cooperative Bank is banking cooperative in the area. Centres in the village, other than Killimangalam, include Uduvadi and Chiramgonam. The Killimangalam Angadikkavu Vela is the festival of the village. Three temples—thekkumuri parappatta shiva temple, Kizhakkumuri keezhillam, and killimangalam angadikkavu temple—participate in the vela maholtsavam, which takes place in February or March.

== Demographics ==
As of 2011 India census, Killimangalam had a population of 9119 with 4402 males and 4717 females.
