= Kozhukkully =

- village
- Location in Kerala, India Kozhukkully (India)
- Coordinates: 10°30′45″N 76°16′30″E
- Country: India
- State: Kerala
- District: Thrissur

Population (2011)
  - Total: 9,918

Languages
  - Official: Malayalam, English
- Time zone: UTC+5:30 (IST)
- PIN: 680751
- Vehicle registration: KL-

Kozhukkully is a village in Thrissur district in the state of Kerala, India.

== Demographics ==
As of the 2011 Indian census, Kozhukkully had a population of 9918 with 4868 males and 5050 females.

== Major Institutions ==
- Swaraj U P School
- Rudhiramala Temple, Cheerakkavu[]
