= Veluthur =

- village
- Location in Kerala, India Veluthur (India)
- Coordinates: 10°29′0″N 76°9′0″E
- Country: India
- State: Kerala
- District: Thrissur

Population (2011)
  - Total: 11,602

Languages
  - Official: Malayalam, English
- Time zone: UTC+5:30 (IST)
- PIN: 680012
- Vehicle registration: KL-
- Nearest city: Thrissur

Veluthur is a village in Thrissur district in the state of Kerala, India. It is surrounded by paddy fields. Veluthur is famous for the Namborkkavu temple vedikettu (fire and cracker works in Pooram festivals).

== Demographics ==
As of 2011 India census, Veluthur had a population of 11602 with 5636 males and 5966 females.
