= Kaniyarkode =

- village
- Location in Kerala, India Kaniyarkode (India)
- Coordinates: 10°44′0″N 76°24′0″E
- Country: India
- State: Kerala
- District: Thrissur

Population (2011)
  - Total: 13,236

Languages
  - Official: Malayalam, English
- Time zone: UTC+5:30 (IST)
- PIN: 6XXXXX
- Vehicle registration: KL-

Kaniyarkode is a village in Thrissur district in the state of Kerala, India.

== Demographics ==
As of 2011 India census, Kaniyarkode had a population of 13,236 with 6,455 males and 6,781 females.
