= Pulakode =

- village
- Country: India
- State: Kerala
- District: Thrissur

Population (2011)
  - Total: 6,456

Languages
  - Official: Malayalam, English
- Time zone: UTC+5:30 (IST)
- PIN: 6XXXXX
- Vehicle registration: KL-

Pulakode is a village in Thrissur district in the state of Kerala, India.

== Demographics ==
As of 2011 India census, Pulakode had a population of 6456 with 3114 males and 3342 females.
