= Choolissery =

- village/town ship
- Location in Kerala, India Choolissery (India)
- Coordinates: 10.593020°N 76.189610°E
- Country: India
- State: Kerala
- District: Thrissur
- Talukas: Thrissur

Languages
  - Official: Malayalam, English
- Time zone: UTC+5:30 (IST)
- PIN: 6XXXXX
- Vehicle registration: KL-

Choolissery is a residential township in Thrissur district in the state of Kerala, India. It is surrounded by paddy fields and is 5 mins drive away from Thrissur city . Choolissery was earlier considered to be a pensioner’s paradise but recently it has become one of the major residential hubs near to Thrissur city. This is mainly due to its strategic location, making it easily accessible to the city center, hospitals, highways, schools etc. Due to the lush green paddy fields surrounding this place one can still enjoy fresh unpolluted air and water.

== Transportation ==
Choolissery is well connected by road and rail. It is near the Government Medical College in Thrissur.
