= Annallur =

- village
- Location in Kerala, India Annallur (India)
- Coordinates: 10.295520°N 76.3038200°E
- Country: India
- State: Kerala
- District: Thrissur

Government
  - Type: Panchayati raj (India)
  - Body: Gram panchayat

Population (2011)
  - Total: 7,070

Languages
  - Official: Malayalam, English
- Time zone: UTC+5:30 (IST)
- PIN: 680731,680307
- Telephone code: 480-278XXXX
- Vehicle registration: KL-45, KL-08
- Nearest city: Chalakudy

Annallur is a village in Thrissur district in the state of Kerala, India. It is located about 33 kilometres (20 miles) from the Thrissur Municipal Corporation and 18 kilometres (11 miles) from the sub-district headquarters of Irinjalakuda. The village is part of the Mala gram panchayat. It is known for its agricultural activities and has a few small-scale industries as well.

== Geography ==
Annallur is located at 10.295520°N 76.3038200°E and has an average elevation of 7 meters (23 feet) above sea level. It is about 6 kilometres(4 miles) from Chalakudy, the closest city. The village is situated about 37 kilometres(23 miles) away from the major city of Thrissur.

== Transportation ==
Annallur is easily reachable by road, train, and air. The nearest airport is Cochin International Airport, which is about 26 kilometres (16 miles) away. The nearest railway station is Chalakudy, which is about 4 kilometres (2 miles) away. The village is well connected by road, and the nearest Kerala State Road Transport Corporation (KSRTC) bus stand is at Chalakudy, which is about 5 kilometres (3 miles) away.

== Demographics ==
As of 2011 India census, Annallur had a population of 7,070 with 3,425 males and 3,645 females.
