= Koottala =

- Village
- Location in Kerala, India Koottala (India)
- Coordinates: 10°36′00.72″N 76°32′59.67″E
- Country: India
- State: Kerala
- District: Thrissur

Government
  - Body: Panchayath/Corporation

Languages
  - Official: Malayalam, English
- Time zone: UTC+5:30 (IST)
- PIN: 680652
- Vehicle registration: KL-08

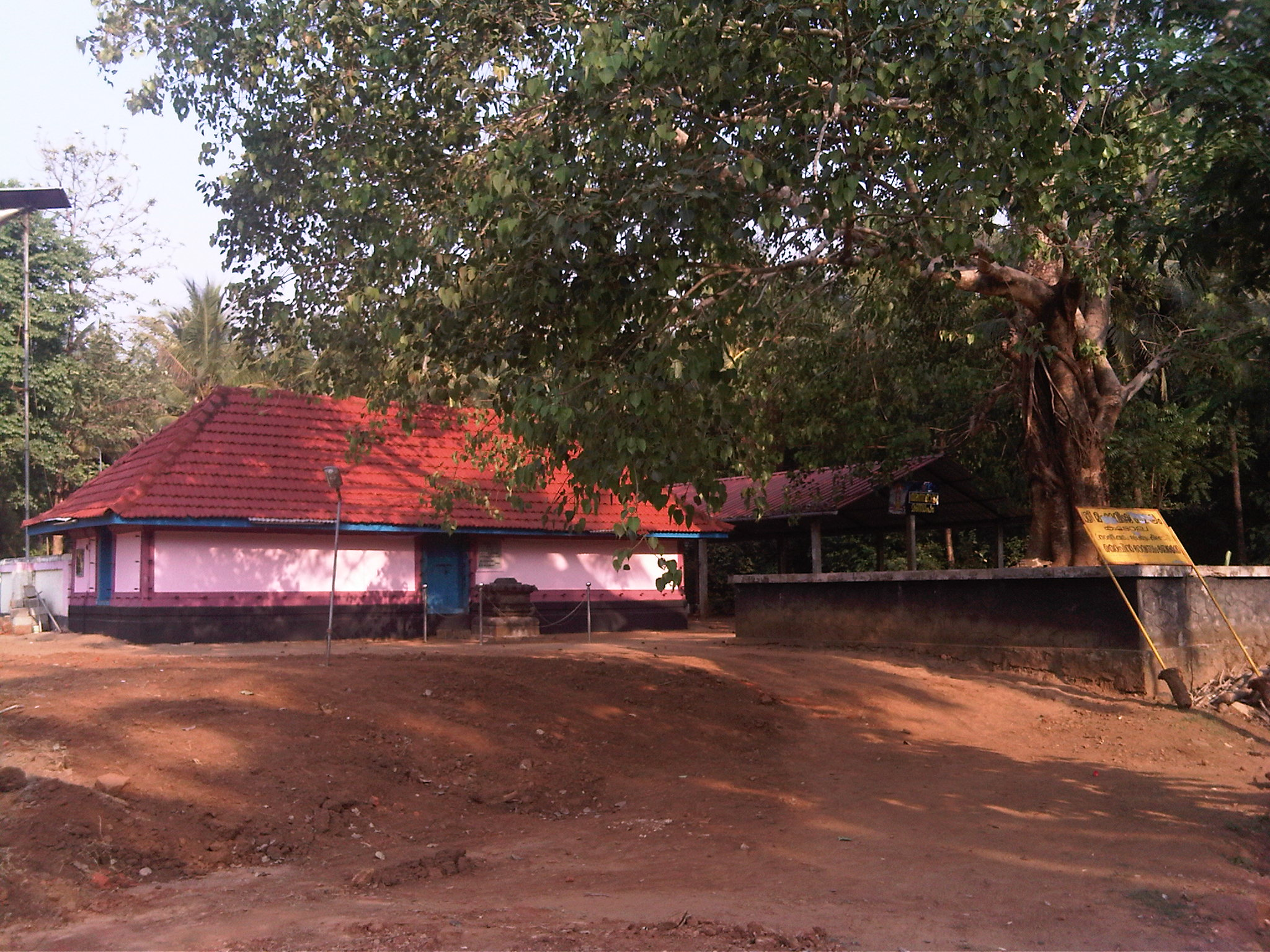
Koottala Sri Mahavishnu Temple

Koottala is a village in Thrissur district, Kerala, India. As of 30 December 2009, the village had a population of 2594 people spread over 572 households under the jurisdiction of pananchery, peechi, mulayam and ollukkara Village . The name Koottala coming from the language Malayalam Aal (Banyan tree), because once upon a time there were a lot of banyan trees. Koottala Sri Mahavishnu Temple is located only 800 metres from Koottala Centre and one Karthyayani temple also located here with a big 'old Pala tree'. Koottala is also known for many Christian churches. Prominent among them are Pentecostal churches such as IPC Thabore Koottala East, IPC Koottala West.
