= Padiyam =

- village
- Location in Kerala, India Padiyam (India)
- Coordinates: 10°27′8″N 76°5′50″E
- Country: India
- State: Kerala
- District: Thrissur

Population (2011)
  - Total: 11,623

Languages
  - Official: Malayalam, English
- Time zone: UTC+5:30 (IST)
- PIN: 6XXXXX
- Vehicle registration: KL-75

Padiyam is a village in Thrissur district in the state of Kerala.

== Demographics ==
As of 2011 India census, Padiyam had a population of 11623 with 5339 males and 6284 females.
