= Kuruvilassery =

- village
- Location in Kerala, India Kuruvilassery (India)
- Coordinates: 10°13′0″N 76°16′35″E
- Country: India
- State: Kerala
- District: Thrissur

Population (2011)
  - Total: 8,653

Languages
  - Official: Malayalam, English
- Time zone: UTC+5:30 (IST)
- PIN: 6XXXXX
- Vehicle registration: KL-

Kuruvilassery is a village in Thrissur district in the state of Kerala, India.

== Demographics ==
As of 2011 India census, Kuruvilassery had a population of 8653 with 4058 males and 4595 females.
