= Chittilappilly =

Chittilappilly chittilappilly
- village
- Location in Kerala, India Chittilappilly (India)
- Coordinates: 10.5641116°N 76.1528256°E
- Country: India
- State: Kerala
- District: Thrissur

Population (2011)
  - Total: 6,988

Languages
  - Official: Malayalam, English
- Time zone: UTC+5:30 (IST)
- PIN: 680551
- Vehicle registration: KL-
- Nearest city: Thrissur
- Lok Sabha constituency: Alathur
- Vidhan Sabha constituency: Vadakanchaery

Chittilappilly is a village in Thrissur district in the state of Kerala, India. It is a part of Adat Grama Panchayat, near its borders with Kaiparambu and Tholur Grama Panchayats.

== Demographics ==
As of 2011 India census, Chittilappilly had a population of 6988 with 3340 males and 3648 females.

Parappur Chittilappilly, is a family with roots in Parappur (a small town in Thrissur).

IES public school and IES engineering college are the important educational institutions situated here.
