= Venginissery =

Venginissery is a suburb in Thrissur district in the state of Kerala, India.

== Demographics ==
As of 2011 India census, Venginissery had a population of 5533 with 2656 males and 2877 females.

Venginissery is situated just 8 km away from Thrissur town. It is the main destination for village tourism in Trichur district. there is a famous temple, AYKUNNU PANDAVAGIRI DEVI KSHETHRAM. A Roman Catholic Church in the name of St. Mary is situated just near to the temple.

Venginissery falls under the Paralam Panchayath, a consolidation of five villages namely Ammadam, Kodannur, Pallippuram, Venginissery and Chenam.

Formerly Venginissery was part of the Cherpu constituency but now it is in Nattika's.

== Religion ==
=== Temples ===
Venginissery
- suburb
- Location in Kerala, India Venginissery (India)
- Coordinates: 10°28′0″N 76°12′0″E
- Country: India
- State: Kerala
- District: Thrissur

Population (2001)
  - Total: 5,647

Languages
  - Official: Malayalam, English
- Time zone: UTC+5:30 (IST)
- PIN: 680563
- Telephone code: 0487-227
- Vehicle registration: KL-75
- Nearest city: Thrissur
- Lok Sabha constituency: Thrissur
- Vidhan Sabha constituency: Nattika

Temple Name	Prathishta (God name)	Festivals
Aykunnu Pandavagiri Devi	Bhagavathy	Pooram & Karthika Vilakku
Cherattu Thrikovil Siva Kshethram	Siva	Sivarathri
Sankaramangalam Sree Siva Kshethram	Siva	Sivarathri
Koottaalakunnu Narasimha Moorthy Kshethram	Mahavishnu	Kaavadi

=== Church ===
St Mary's Christian Church

== Education ==
Gurukulam Public School :- In 1994, Gurukulam Public School entered a new phase when the Trust acquired about eight acres of land on the serenely located Aykunnu hill in Venginissery Village which is about 8 km away from Thrissur town. The land was just apt for developing a full-fledged CBSE school having adequate area for playground and buildings.

C.A. Lower Primary School :- Syro-Malabar Church School
