= Kallur Vadakkummuri =

- village
- Interactive map of Kallur Vadakkummuri
- Country: India
- State: Kerala
- District: Thrissur

Population (2011)
  - Total: 25,259

Languages
  - Official: Malayalam, English
- Time zone: UTC+5:30 (IST)
- PIN: 6XXXXX
- Vehicle registration: KL-

Kallur Vadakkummuri is a village in Thrissur district in the state of Kerala, India.

== Demographics ==
As of 2011 India census, Kallur Vadakkummuri had a population of 25259 with 12166 males and 13093 females. Schools:Saraswathy Vilasam LP School, Annanadu may be the oldest in this village.

Kallur Vadakkummuri falls under the Grama Panchayat Kadukutty. The Grama Panchayat Office is situated on the other side of the Chalakudy River. Kallur Vadakkummuri is connected to NH47 through Palayam Parambu Bridge and Annamanada Pulikkakadavu Bridge over the Chalakudy River.

There are many old Hindu Temples in Kallur, including famous examples such as the Gokunnathu (Shiva Temple), the Chempikkadathu (Bhagavathi Temple) and the Pathippathrikka (Shree Krishna Temple).
