= Venganellur =

Venganellur Venganelloor
- village
- Location in Kerala, India Venganellur (India)
- Coordinates: 10°42′0″N 76°20′0″E
- Country: India
- State: Kerala
- District: Thrissur

Government
  - Body: Chelakkara G P

Population (2011)
  - Total: 10,664

Languages
  - Official: Malayalam, English
- Time zone: UTC+5:30 (IST)
- PIN: 680586
- Telephone code: 0488425
- Vehicle registration: KL-48
- Nearest city: Chelakkara
- Lok Sabha constituency: Alathur
- Vidhan Sabha constituency: Chelakkara
- Civic agency: Chelakkara G P
- Climate: Temperate (Köppen)

Venganellur is a village in Thrissur district in the state of Kerala, India. Areas of Interests:Venganellur Sivakshethram is an ancient temple dedicated to Siva in the form of Thiruveembilappan under control of Cochin Devaswam Board, Trissur. Chakiar koothu is conducted regularly here in Medam month for 30 days. Ashtami in Vrishchikam and Shivarathri are the main festivals being celebrated at this temple. Thalikulam (a pond near this temple) believed to be created by the foot step of Hanuman when he landed here while bringing Mrita sanjeevani to Lakshmanan. The 'Vela' of Venganellur Desam starts from here to Anthimahakalan Temple as part of the festival. NMLP School is the school which offers public instruction. The headquarters of Venganellur Service Cooperative Bank is at Venganellur.

== Demographics ==
As of 2011 India census, Venganellur had a population of 10664 with 5047 males and 5617 females.
