= Thoykavu =

Village in India

Thoykavu is a small seaside town/village in the outskirts of Thrissur, Kerala, India.
