= Chamakunnu =

Chamakunnu Vadakkumkara
- village
- Satellite Image of Chamakunnu
- Interactive map of Chamakunnu
- Coordinates: 10°18′47″N 76°12′34″E
- Country: India
- State: Kerala
- District: Thrissur
- Elevation: 12 m (39 ft)

Population (2001)
  - Total: 2,000

Languages
  - Official: Malayalam, English
- Time zone: UTC+5:30 (IST)
- PIN: 680662
- Telephone code: 0480-286xxxx

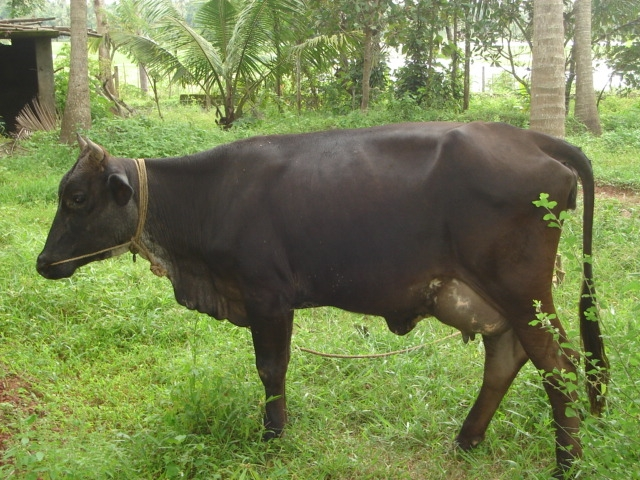
Cow in Chamakunnu

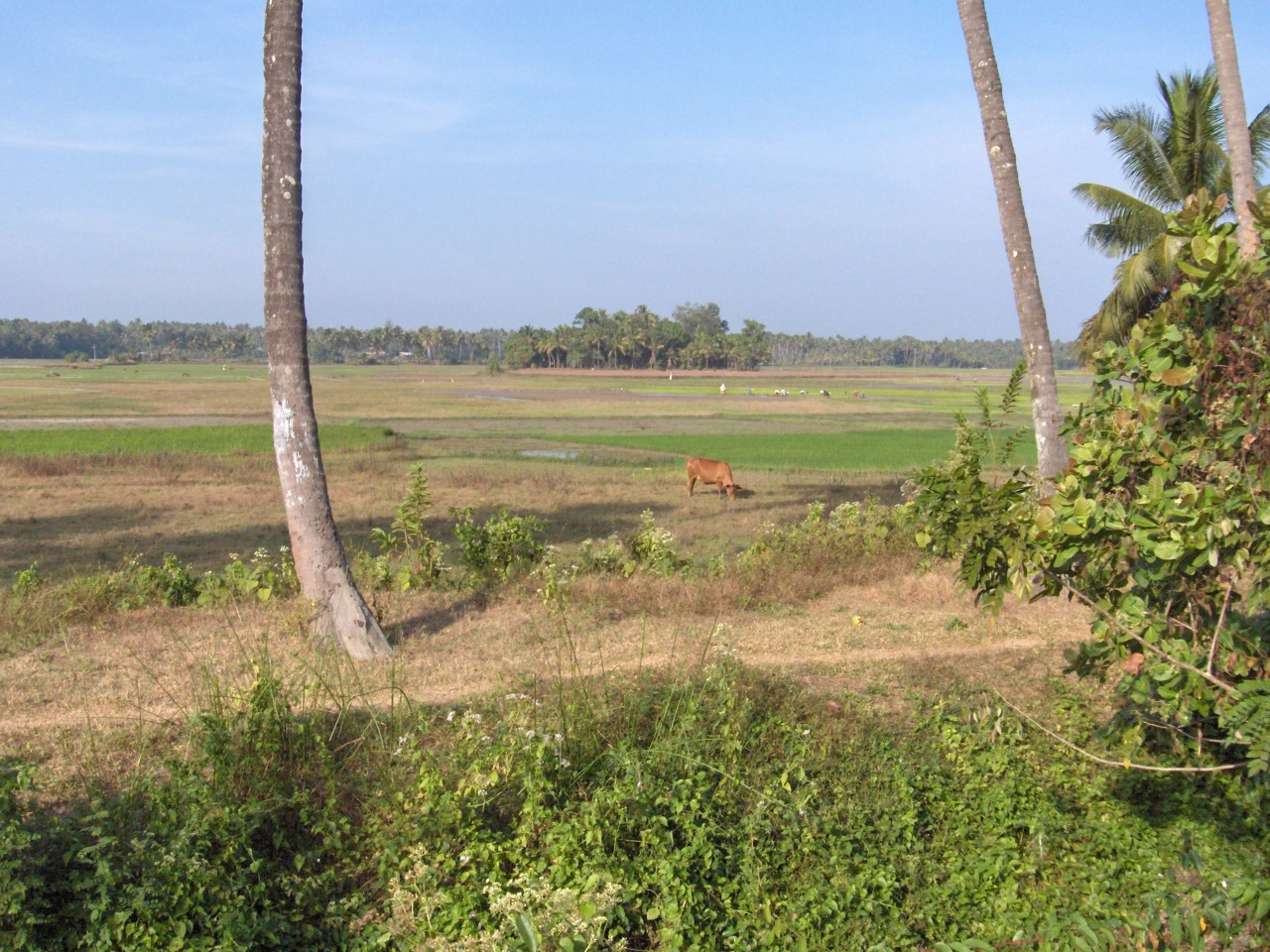
Chamakunnu-Thotuvarambu

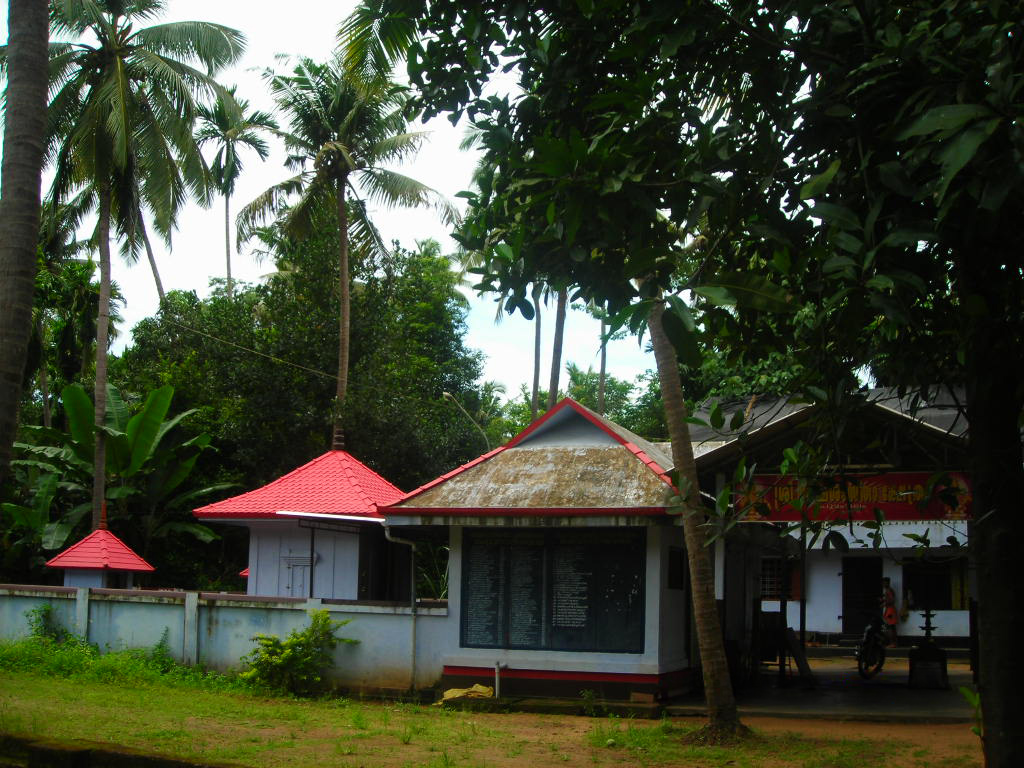
Ayyappa temple

Chamakunnu is a village in Kerala, India.

== Economy ==
Chamakunnu is known for its varied spice and fruit farms. Included are coconut, paprika and various spices, plantain, tapioca, mangoes, jack fruit, teak, manjium, pineapple, papaya, flowers, kodapulli, vanilla, chickoo and other fruits. Historically, the population of Chamakunnu was primarily made up of farmers, but in modern times, most inhabitants are well-educated, and work both in and outside of the village.

== Etymology ==
While the literal meaning of the place name "kunnu" indicates a mountain or hill, the village lies on a mostly flat region.

== Geography ==
Chamakunnu is located in Vellangallur Panjayath, Thrissur district of Indian state of Kerala. It is about 58 kilometres (36 mi) from the present-day city of Kochi, Kerala and 26 kilometres (16 mi) km from Thrissur, 5 kilometres (3 mi) from Irinjalakkuda. Its latitude and longitude are .

== Worship Places ==
Ayyappa Temple & St. Antony's Church are the main worship places in Chamakunnu.

St. Antony's Church is the worship place for Christian community in the village, and is under the Irinjalakuda diocese. The "Pindi Perunnal" is a famous festival held each year in January.

Ayyappa Temple is the worship place for the local Hindu community of the village. "Ayyappa Vilakku" is a Hindu festival celebrated annually. The temple is maintained by the Ayyappa Seva Samiti trust.
