= Kadikkad =

- village
- Location in Kerala, India Kadikkad (India)
- Coordinates: 10°40′0″N 75°58′0″E
- Country: India
- State: Kerala
- District: Thrissur

Population (2011)
  - Total: 19,147

Languages
  - Official: Malayalam, English
- Time zone: UTC+5:30 (IST)
- PIN: 6XXXXX
- Vehicle registration: KL-

Kadikkad is a village in Thrissur district in the state of Kerala, India. It is situated in the Punnayurkulam panchayat, near the border with Malappuram district, 12 km north of the temple town of Guruvayoor and 15 km south of Ponnani.

== Demographics ==
As of 2011 India census, Kadikkad had a population of 19147 with 8734 males and 10413 females.
