= Annakara =

- village
- Location in Kerala, India Annakara (India)
- Coordinates: 10°33′0″N 76°6′0″E
- Country: India
- State: Kerala
- District: Thrissur

Government
  - Type: Panchayati raj (India)
  - Body: Gram panchayat

Population (2011)
  - Total: 9,511

Languages
  - Official: Malayalam, English
- Time zone: UTC+5:30 (IST)
- PIN: 680508
- Vehicle registration: KL-46

Annakara is a village in Thrissur district in the state of Kerala, India. Located on the western bank of Kechery river, it was earlier a border village, located near the junction of Malabar region of Madras presidency and Kochi kingdom. Annakara village comes under Mullassery Grama Panchayat. Chirakkal Bagavathy temple is located in this village.

== Demographics ==
As of 2011 India census, Annakara had a population of 9511 with 4536 males and 4975 females.
