= Parakkad =

- village
- Location in Kerala, India Parakkad (India)
- Coordinates: 10.5050400°N 76.152740°E
- Country: India
- State: Kerala
- District: Thrissur

Population (2011)
  - Total: 9,093

Languages
  - Official: Malayalam, English
- Time zone: UTC+5:30 (IST)
- PIN: 680620
- Vehicle registration: KL-08

Parakkad is a village in Thrissur district in the state of Kerala, India.The main landmark in Parakkad is Cheloor Kunnu Ayappa Temple. The main town near to Parakkad is Thrissur.

== Demographics ==
As of 2011 India census, Parakkad had a population of 9093 with 4422 males and 4671 females.
