= Kizhuppillikkara =

- village
- Location in Kerala, India Kizhuppillikkara (India)
- Coordinates: 10.398961°N 76.143354°E
- Country: India
- State: Kerala
- District: Thrissur

Population (2011)
  - Total: 5,275

Languages
  - Official: Malayalam, English
- Time zone: UTC+5:30 (IST)
- PIN: 680702
- Vehicle registration: KL-75

Kizhuppillikkara is a village in Thaniyam Panchayath in Thrissur district in the state of Kerala, India. Two-thirds of the village is surrounded by the Karuvannur river. Kizhuppillikkara provides great government education systems. There is ശ്രീനാരായണ സമാജം എയ്ഡഡ് ലോവർ പ്രൈമറി സ്കൂൾ for LP students and ഗവ: നളന്ദ ഹയർ സെക്കന്ററി സ്കൂൾ for secondary and higher secondary. The place is adverse with paddy fields and greenery. It's also rich with cultural and heritage programmes, where all people come together and support each other. It's also religiously packed.

== Demographics ==
As of 2011 India census, Kizhuppillikkara had a population of 5275 with 2379 males and 2,896 females.
