= Edakkalathur =

- village
- Location in Kerala, India Edakkalathur (India)
- Coordinates: 10°35′0″N 76°7′0″E
- Country: India
- State: Kerala
- District: Thrissur

Population (2011)
  - Total: 8,039

Languages
  - Official: Malayalam, English
- Time zone: UTC+5:30 (IST)
- PIN: 680552
- Telephone code: 0487-
- Vehicle registration: KL- 08
- Nearest city: Thrissur
- Lok Sabha constituency: Vadakanchery
- Vidhan Sabha constituency: Alathur

Edakkalathur is a village in Thrissur district in the state of Kerala, India.

== Demographics ==
As of 2011 India census, Edakkalathur had a population of 8039 with 3799 males and 4240 females.
