= Kurumpilavu =

Kurumpilavu കുറുമ്പിലാവ്
- village
- Location in Kerala, India Kurumpilavu (India)
- Coordinates: 10°24′40″N 76°10′20″E
- Country: India
- State: Kerala
- District: Thrissur

Government
  - Type: Democratic
  - Body: Panchayath

Population (2011)
  - Total: 14,329

Languages
  - Official: Malayalam, English
- Time zone: UTC+5:30 (IST)
- PIN: 680564
- Vehicle registration: KL-08 / KL-75

Kurumpilavu is a village in Thrissur district in the state of Kerala, India. Major area of Kurumpilavu is covered with paddy and coconut fields. Kurumpilavu has two Major Hindu temples, Devi (Thiruvanikkavu Amma ) and Krishna (Kurumpilavu Shree Krishna Kshethram CBE and several other family owned temples, Nearby Kurumpilavu has one Church and one Mosque, one LP government school and one management UP and High School in the name of Bhodhananda Swami, the first disciple of Sree Narayana Guru.

Nearest Town to Kurumpilavu is Thriprayar which is located 7 kilometres to the west and another is Cherpu which is 7 km to the east.

Kurumpilavu is balanced in caste, religion and politics and is a peaceful region.

== Demographics ==
As of 2011 India census, Kurumpilavu had a population of 14329 with 6692 males and 7637 females.
