= Peringandoor =

- village
- Location in Kerala, India Peringandoor (India)
- Coordinates: 10.6243600°N 76.200600°E
- Country: India
- State: Kerala
- District: Thrissur

Population (2001)
  - Total: 5,434

Languages
  - Official: Malayalam, English
- Time zone: UTC+5:30 (IST)
- Vehicle registration: KL-48

Peringandoor is a village in Thrissur district in the state of Kerala, India. Talappilly, Chavakkad, Kodungallur, Mukundapuram, Thrissur etc. are the nearest towns / cities to Peringandoor village.

== Demographics ==
As of the 2011 India census, Peringandoor had a population of 5577 with 2646 males and 2931 females.
