= Vadakkethara =

- village
- Location in Kerala, India Vadakkethara (India)
- Coordinates: 10°39′30″N 76°28′0″E
- Country: India
- State: Kerala
- District: Thrissur

Population (2011)
  - Total: 10,261

Languages
  - Official: Malayalam, English
- Time zone: UTC+5:30 (IST)
- PIN: 6XXXXX
- Vehicle registration: KL-

Vadakkethara is a village in Thrissur district in the state of Kerala, India.

== Demographics ==
As of 2011 India census, Vadakkethara had a population of 10261 with 4963 males and 5298 females.
