= Vellookkara =

- village
- Interactive map of Vellookkara
- Country: India
- State: Kerala
- District: Thrissur

Population (2001)
  - Total: 8,019

Languages
  - Official: Malayalam, English
- Time zone: UTC+5:30 (IST)
- PIN: 6XXXXX
- Vehicle registration: KL-

Vellookkara is a village in Thrissur district in the state of Kerala, India.

== Demographics ==
As of 2011 India census, Vellookkara had a population of 8146 with 3697 males and 4449 females.
