= Viruppakka =

- village
- Location in Kerala, India Viruppakka (India)
- Coordinates: 10°38′0″N 76°17′0″E
- Country: India
- State: Kerala
- District: Thrissur
- Talukas: Talappilly

Languages
  - Official: Malayalam, English
- Time zone: UTC+5:30 (IST)
- PIN: 680589
- Vehicle registration: KL-48
- Nearest city: Wadakkanchery
- Lok Sabha constituency: Alathur
- Vidhan Sabha constituency: Wadakkanchery

Viruppakka is a village in Thrissur district in the state of Kerala, India. There is co-operate spinning Mill at Viruppakka. Perapara Check-dam also is a part of Viruppakka. Religious places in Viruppakka - Vasudeva Puram Temple, 2 Mosques and St. George Malankara Catholic Church.
