= Vallivattom =

- village
- Location in Kerala, India Vallivattom (India)
- Coordinates: 10.2788°N 76.1928°E
- Country: India
- State: Kerala
- District: Thrissur

Languages
  - Official: Malayalam, English
- Time zone: UTC+5:30 (IST)
- Vehicle registration: KL-45

Vallivattom is a remote village in the Vellangur Panchayat district of Kerala, the southernmost state of India. Its eastern boundary has the Trichur-Kodungallor road. The town is 13 km (9.6 mi) from Kodungallor and Irinjalakuda.

Vallivattom has five schools, and its literacy rate is 75%. It is religiously diverse, containing seven mosques, 15 Hindu temples, and 3 churches. Its primary industries are coir production, Transportation, Retail Shop, Coconut Oil mill. The primary roads in and around the village are NH 17, the Trichur-Kodungallor Road, the Konathukunnu-Poovathumkadavu Road, the Paingode-Konathukunnu Road, and the Karupadanna-Chirattakkunnu Road.

== Vallivattom Kadav ==
The boat is used as water transport which helps in connecting Vellangalloor panchayat with SN Puram panchayat.
