= Pallur, Thrissur =

Pallur
- village
- Location in Kerala, India Pallur (India)
- Coordinates: 10.7666100°N 76.228550°E
- Country: India
- State: Kerala
- District: Thrissur

Population (2011)
  - Total: 7,197

Languages
  - Official: Malayalam, English
- Time zone: UTC+5:30 (IST)
- PIN: 6XXXXX
- Vehicle registration: KL-

Pallur is a village in Thrissur district in the state of Kerala, India.

== Demographics ==
As of 2011 India census, Pallur had a population of 7197 with 3487 males and 3710 females.
