= Karumathra =

- village
- Country: India
- State: Kerala
- District: Thrissur
- Talukas: thalapilly

Languages
  - Official: Malayalam, English
- Time zone: UTC+5:30 (IST)
- PIN: 680123
- Vehicle registration: KL-

Karumathra is a village in Thrissur district in the state of Kerala, India.
