= Vadakkumkara =

- village
- Interactive map of Vadakkumkara
- Coordinates: 10°18′5″N 76°12′20″E
- Country: India
- State: Kerala
- District: Thrissur

Government
  - Type: Panchayati raj (India)
  - Body: Gram panchayat

Population (2011)
  - Total: 10,407

Languages
  - Official: Malayalam, English
- Time zone: UTC+5:30 (IST)
- PIN: 6XXXXX
- Vehicle registration: KL-

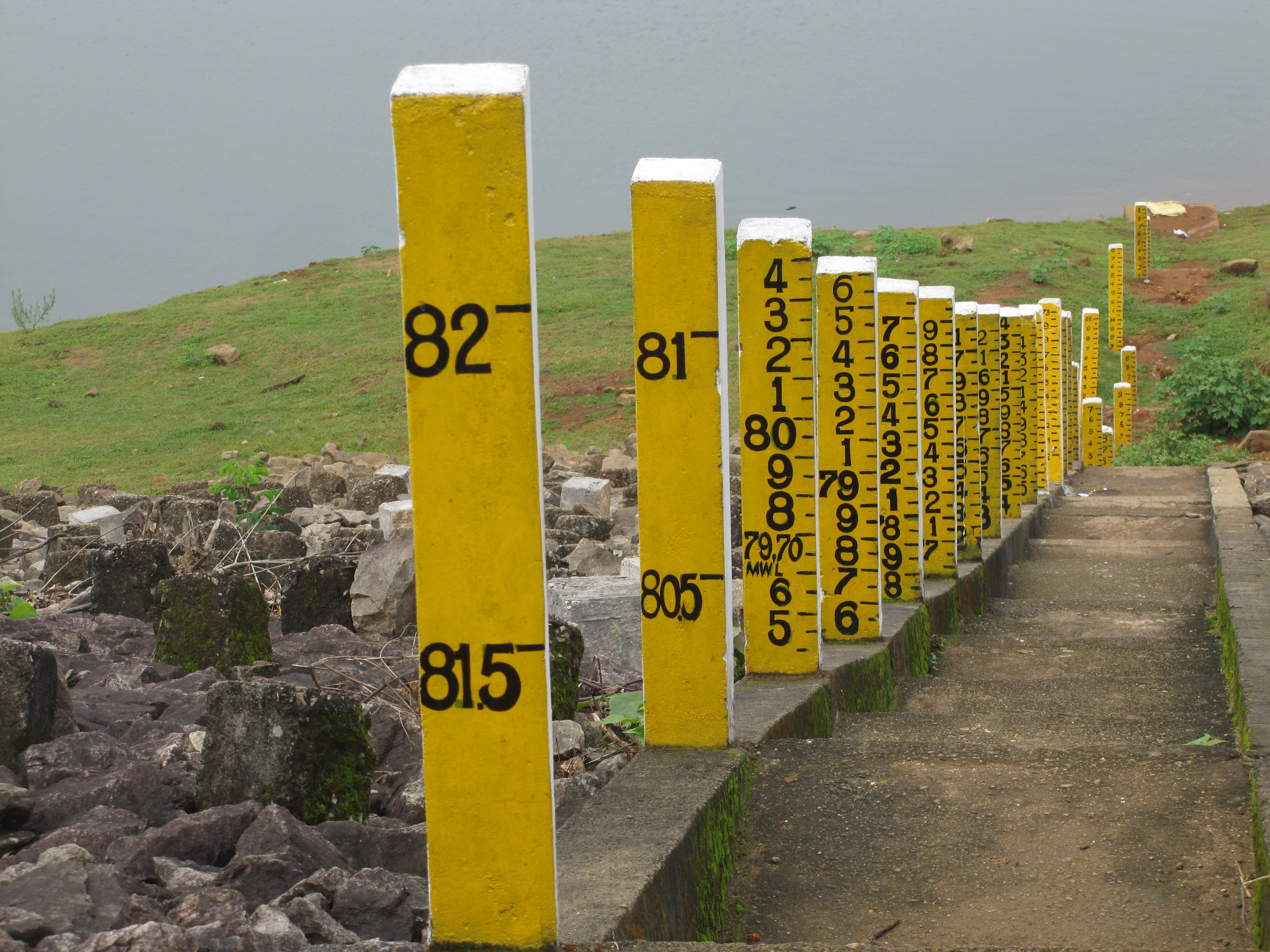
Chimmini Wildlife Sanctuary

Vadakkumkara is a village in Thrissur district in the state of Kerala, India.

== Demographics ==
As of 2011 India census, Vadakkumkara had a population of 10407 with 4862 males and 5,545 females.
