= Thazhekad, Thrissur =

Coordinates: 10°19′59″N 76°16′21″E

Thazhekad, is the site of one of the earliest St Thomas Christian communities in Kerala. Once a prosperous inland port, during heyday of Muziris. The landscape was changed with the great floods of 1341AD.

It is the site of the Thazhekad Sasanam, a stone inscribed with one of the earliest surviving edicts granting special privileges to the St Thomas Christians. The inscription can be dated palaeographically to between the 8th and 10th centuries. The Thazhekad St Sebastian church is one of the oldest in Kerala dating back to AD 800. The church is also the largest pilgrimage center in the Irinjalakuda Diocese.

The churches and temples in the area were ravaged by Tippu Sultan's army, during his invasion of the south, between 1789 and 1791.
