= Parappukkara =

- village
- Location in Kerala, India Parappukkara (India)
- Coordinates: 10.406440°N 76.2657100°E
- Country: India
- State: Kerala
- District: Thrissur

Government
  - Body: Parappukkara

Population (2011)
  - Total: 11,893

Languages
  - Official: Malayalam, English
- Time zone: UTC+5:30 (IST)
- PIN: 680310
- Vehicle registration: KL-45
- Nearest city: Thrissur
- Civic agency: Parappukkara

Parappukkara is a village in Thrissur district in the state of Kerala, India.

== Demographics ==
As of 2011 India census, Parappukkara had a population of 11893 with 5703 males and 6190 females.
