= Vallachira =

- Census town
- Location in Kerala, India
- Coordinates: 10°26′0″N 76°14′0″E
- Country: India
- State: Kerala
- District: Thrissur

Population (2001)
  - Total: 13,443

Languages
  - Official: Malayalam, English
- Time zone: UTC+5:30 (IST)

Vallachira is a census town near to Puthukkad in Thrissur district in the Indian state of Kerala.

== Demographics ==
As of 2001 India census, Vallachira had a population of 13,443. Males constitute 49% of the population and females 51%. Vallachira has an average literacy rate of 83%, higher than the national average of 59.5%: male literacy is 85%, and female literacy is 81%. In Vallachira, 11% of the population is under 6 years of age.

== Schools ==
"Vallachira Panchayath Onagosham" is famous. The main schools at Vallachira are Govt. Upper Primary School, St. Thomas higher secondary school, Kandeswaram school, Kadalassery school, and Santa Maria Academy.

== Celebrities ==
Famous Vallacherians include Priyanandanan.

== Festivals ==
Vallachira Panchayath has many cultural clubs, including Avishkkara, MahaRasikan [MRC], Yuvajanasamathi, Kiran Kalavedi, Universal Club, Panorama, Navadara, Navapushpa, Santos, and Modern Recreation Club. Vallachira is adorned with serene beauty of nature and with many festive movements. People used to celebrate the festival enthusiastically. Vallachira is famous for Peedikeparambu Aanayottam, Chathakudam puram .....they also celebrate Kumbha Bharani, St. Sebastian Perunal. Elephant is an indispensable part in all our festival along with singarimelam (Drum Beat) and Kavadiyattam (a ritualistic dance form which is generally performed by the devotees with ornate kavadies on their head).

== Economy ==
Vallachira is also famous for Gold works and it is the main occupation for lot of youth. The youth here are also active in maintaining traditional art forms which is depicted in "Onagosham", you will be able to see ottamthullal, kummattikali, pulluvanpaattu, villadichan pattu, daff muttu, and kolkali.

== Tourism ==
Vallachira is good for sightseeing like Muttikkal Dam, Pallissery Hill Top, Paddy fields, Vallachira Temple, Chathakudam Temple, St. Thomas Church, etc. Thaikattussery, Cherpu, Urakam, Perinchery, Arattupuzha, and Eravakkad are nearby.

== Freeway accessibility ==
Vallachira is accessible through the NH 47 freeway via back roads that go through some of the most beautiful landscapes in Kerala. Vallachira is just 12 km from Trichur City limits. It is connected both to NH 47 and NH 17. Irinjalakuda is 12 km away.

== Educational institutions ==
=== Schools ===
Institution	Medium of instruction	Syllabus
St. Thomas H.S.S. Vallachira	Malayalam	Kerala State
Santa Maria Academy	English	CBSE
Government UP School, Vallachira	Malayalam	Kerala state
