= Venkitangu =

- village
- Location in Kerala, India Venkitangu (India)
- Coordinates: 10°31′0″N 76°5′0″E
- Country: India
- State: Kerala
- District: Thrissur

Population (2011)
  - Total: 11,335

Languages
  - Official: Malayalam, English
- Time zone: UTC+5:30 (IST)
- PIN: 680510
- Vehicle registration: KL-46

Venkitangu is a Panchayath in Thrissur district in the state of Kerala, India.

Venkitangu is a village located in Mullassery Block in the Thrissur District of Kerala, India. It belongs to the Central Kerala Division. It is located 14 km west from District headquarters Thrissur, 3 km from Mullassery and 286 km from State capital Thiruvananthapuram. The village is bounded on east by kolnilam, on the west by Kanolikanal on the south by Enamavu lake and the north by Mullassery village.

== Socio-Economic ==
Agriculture is the main source of livelihood of the people of this village. The village has dense coconut groves and lush green paddy fields. Karuvanthala temple, Padoor Juma masjid, and Enamavu mosque built in the 500th century AD are some the ancient places for worship in the village. The pilgrimage center Konchira Pompemata Church is also located in this village.

The pin code of Venkitangu is 680510 and the postal head office is Venkitangu.

Manalur (4 km), Engandiyur (5 km), Elavally (6 km), Arimpoor (6 km), Adat (6 km), Mullassery are nearby villages of Venkitangu. Venkitangu is surrounded by Thalikkulam Block towards South, Chavakkad Block towards North, Puzhakkal Block towards North and Anthikkad Block towards South.

Thrissur, Kunnamkulam, Guruvayoor, Irinjalakuda and Chalakudy are the nearby cities of Venkitangu. It is home to the famous Karuvanthala temple.

There are many traditional ancient Namboodiri houses located in this village and these houses are called "Mana". "Manthitta Mana" which found mention in "Bhramara Sandesham", 300 year old " Ullanoor Mana, 130 year old " Pattor Mattom" are located in this village.

It is near the Arabian sea and there is a chance of humidity in the weather.

== Educational Institutions ==
Sal Sabeel Arabic College, Venkitangu

GMLPS, Venkitangu

Aleemul Isalm Higher Secondary School, Padoor, Venkitangu

== Notable Places ==
There are some notable places in Venkitangu, including:

Kanoli Kanal

Kannoth Kole

Blue Serene Resort

Kolumadu Thuruthu

== Important Personalities ==
Fr Joseph Vadakkan

Milan Jaleel

Valsala Menon

Nandan Venkitangu, fictional character

== Demographics ==
As of 2011 India census, Venkitangu had a population of 11335 with 5204 males and 6131 females. Literacy rate of Venkitangu is 95.85%. Male literacy is around 97.70% and female literacy rate is 94.33%.

== Name ==
The name of "Venkitangu" is derived from the word "van kidangu" (big city).
