= Poomangalam =

- village
- Interactive map of Poomangalam
- Country: India
- State: Kerala
- District: Thrissur

Population (2011)
  - Total: 11,141

Languages
  - Official: Malayalam, English
- Time zone: UTC+5:30 (IST)
- PIN: 6XXXXX
- Vehicle registration: KL-

Poomangalam is a village in Thrissur district in the state of Kerala, India.

== Demographics ==
As of 2011 India census, Poomangalam had a population of 11141 with 5086 males and 6055 females.
