= Manalithara =

- village
- Location in Kerala, India Manalithara (India)
- Coordinates: 10°38′0″N 76°17′0″E
- Country: India
- State: Kerala
- District: Thrissur

Government
  - Type: Yes
  - Body: Gram panchayat

Population (2011)
  - Total: 7,581

Languages
  - Official: Malayalam, English
- Time zone: UTC+5:30 (IST)
- PIN: 680589
- Telephone code: 4884
- Vehicle registration: KL-08, 48
- Nearest city: Wadakkanchery
- Vidhan Sabha constituency: Wadakkanchery

Manalithara is a village in Thrissur district in the state of Kerala, India. It is Situated at Thekkumkara Gramapachayath.

== Demographics ==
As of 2011 India census, Manalithara had a population of 7581 with 3671 males and 3910 females. Manalithara village is 7 km away from the nearest town Wadakkanchery in Thrissur district. The village is situated in Thekkumkara Grama Panchayath. Manalithara is 3 km away from Vazhani Dam. Irrigation canal from Vazahani dam is going through Manalithara. Vazhani dam and the irrigation canals are the main source of water in nearby villages.

The village consists of one Mosque and a temple (Siva temple). The village take part in the famous temple festival Machad Mamangam (Machad vela), which takes place in Thiruvanikavu temple, located 4 km away from Manalithara. farming is the main source of income of natives. The population consists of Hindus, Muslims and Christians.

The village has a Lower Primary school (JV Machad), a public Library (Grameena Vayanasala) and a public nursery. The center of village is known as Manalithara Kaval, which has a couple of grocery shops and a local restaurant. The village does not have any proper bus station, hotel, hospital etc. The villages have to reach the nearest town (Wadakkanchery)for hospital, colleges and for shopping. The village is lush green throughout year.
