= Pullu =

Pullu പുള്ള്‌
- village
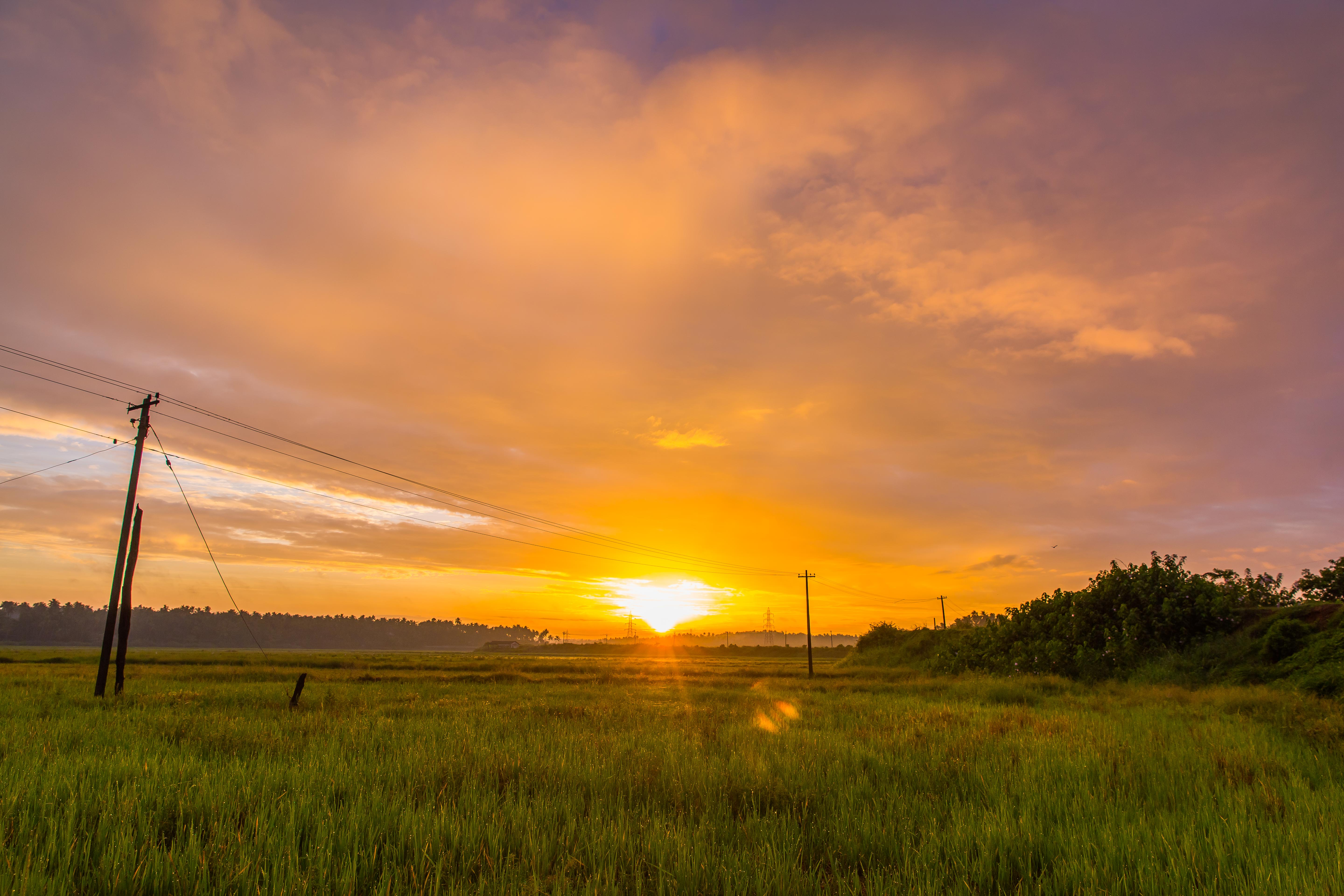
- Sunrise over the Agricultural Fields in Pullu Padam
- Country: India
- State: Kerala
- District: Thrissur
- Taluks: Thrissur

Government
  - Body: panchayath

Languages
  - Official: Malayalam, English
- Time zone: UTC+5:30 (IST)
- PIN: 680641
- Vehicle registration: KL-08

Pullu (പുള്ള്‌ in Malayalam) is a village in Thrissur district in the state of Kerala, India. It is a part of Chazhoor Grama Panchayath(ചാഴൂർ). Kole wetlands and paddy fields (കോൾ പാടങ്ങൾ) form the geographical landscape around the village. It is also the Hometown of Malayalam film actress Manju Warrier (മഞ്ജു വാരിയർ ).
