= Vadanappally =

Vadanappally Vatanappally
- Census Town
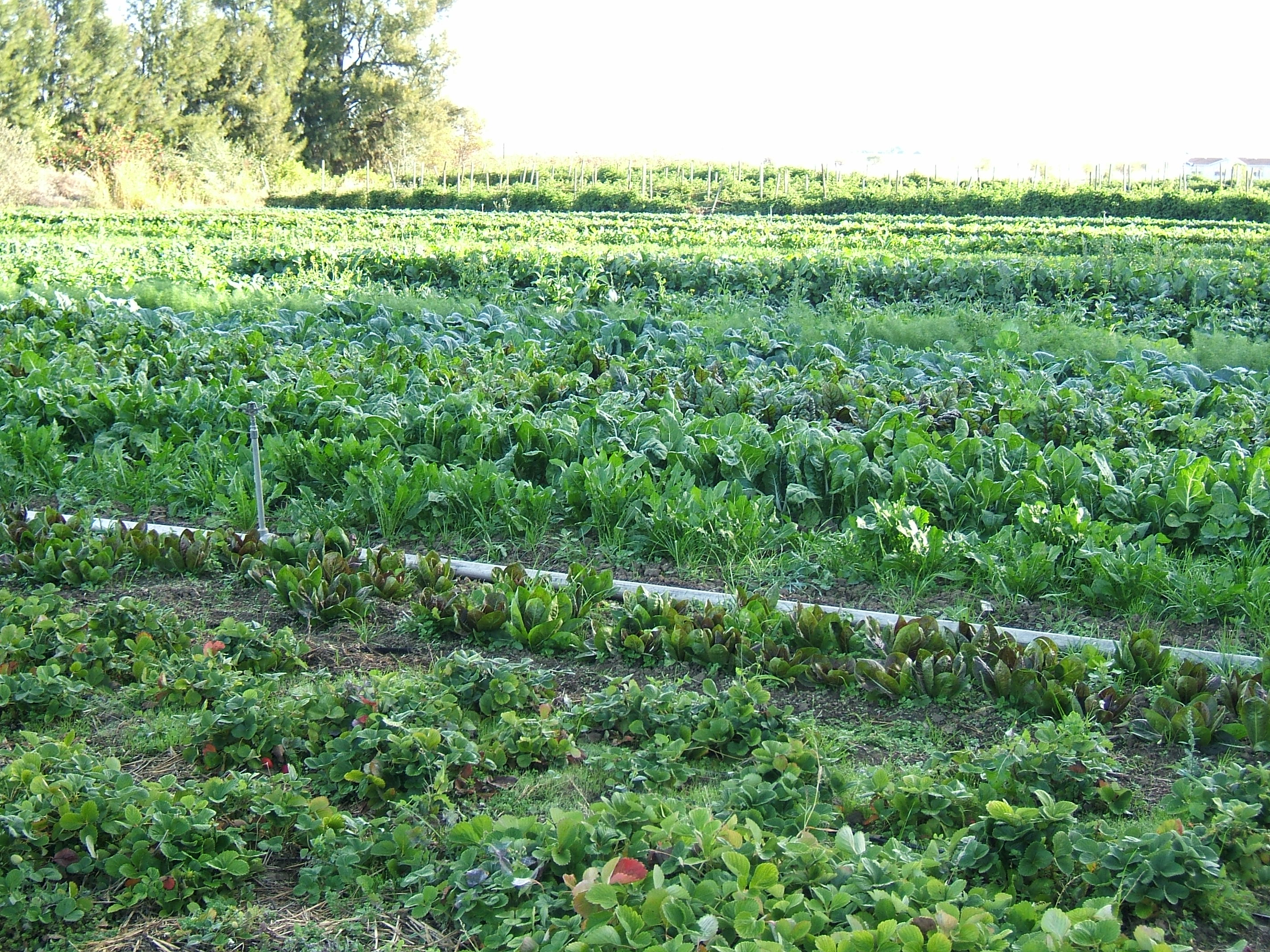
- Organic farming is common in Manaloor, Vatanappally.

- Location in Kerala, India Vadanappally (India)
- Coordinates: 10°28′0″N 76°5′0″E
- Country: India
- State: Kerala
- District: Thrissur

Government
  - Type: Panchayati Raj (India)
  - Body: Vatanappally Grama Panchayat

Area
  - Total: 14.6 km^{2} (5.6 sq mi)

Population (2011)
  - Total: 30,657
  - Density: 2,100/km^{2} (5,440/sq mi)

Languages
  - Official: Malayalam, English
- Time zone: UTC+5:30 (IST)
- PIN: 680614
- Telephone code: 0487
- Vehicle registration: KL08/46/75
- Nearest city: Thrissur

Vatanappally (Vatanappilly/) is a panchayat and census town in Thrissur district, in the state of Kerala, India.

Vatanapally is a small coastal village on the coastal belt of Thrissur district, about 19 km (12 mi) from Thrissur town. It is the nearest point on NH 66 from Trichur city. It is at a junction from where one can directly reach Kodungallur, Guruvayur and Thrissur town. Vatanappally is next to Kandassankadavau (an ancient trade centre) and NH 66 passes straight through the heart of the town.

Durga devi temple, South Juma Masjid, St. Francis church and the beach are nearby tourist attractions. Snehatheeram is a nearby tourist beach at Talikulam, which is about 4 km (2.5 mi) from Vatanappally. Every year a beach festival named Oruma is celebrated here.

Guruvayoor Temple, Palayoor Church, Thriprayar Temple, Kodungallur Cheraman Juma Masjid Vatanapally Temple, Thirumangalam temple (listed in 108 swayambu siva temples), Chavakkad Manathala Mosque, shankaramangallam shiva temple and Kodungallur Temple are some of the nearby pilgrim centres. Vatanappally pincode :680614

== Beach ==
A pleasant and clean beach situated on the Arabian coast just 18 km from Thrissur, the cultural capital of Kerala, is just 3 km from Vadanapilly. The coast is lined with patches of coral reef rimmed by green coconut palms. It is suited to swimming, surfing and sunbathing. The beach is linked with exotic backwaters, and it is possible to row a vanchi (a country boat) along the coconut palm fringed backwaters.

== Demographics ==
As of 2011 Census, Vatanappally had a population of 30,657 which constitute 13,966 males and 16,691 females. Vatanapplly census town has an area of 14.6 km^{2} (5.6 sq mi) with 7,302 families residing in it. The average female sex ratio was 1195 higher than the state average of 1084. 10.3% of the population was under 6 years of age. Vatanappally had an average literacy of 95.7% higher than the state average of 94%.

== Transport ==
- Nearest airport: Cochin International Airport, Ernakulam - 60 km
- Nearest railway station: Guruvayur - 17 km
- Other railway station: Thrissur - 18 km

== Organic farming ==
Manalur is known for organic farming. When the Indian prime minister visited Manalur in 2016, food for an audience of 3,000 was prepared in Manalur using organic farming techniques.
