= Padiyur =

- village
- Location in Kerala, India Padiyur (India)
- Coordinates: 10°19′20″N 76°10′45″E
- Country: India
- State: Kerala
- District: Thrissur

Population (2011)
  - Total: 8,823

Languages
  - Official: Malayalam, English
- Time zone: UTC+5:30 (IST)
- PIN: 680695
- Vehicle registration: KL-45

Padiyur is a village in Thrissur district in the state of Kerala, India. Irinjalakuda and Kodungallur are the nearest towns.

== Demographics ==
As of 2011 India census, Padiyur had a population of 8823 with 4115 males and 4708 females.
