= Madayikonam =

- village
- Location in Kerala, India Madayikonam (India)
- Coordinates: 10°22′0″N 76°13′40″E
- Country: India
- State: Kerala
- District: Thrissur

Population (2011)
  - Total: 14,155

Languages
  - Official: Malayalam, English
- Time zone: UTC+5:30 (IST)
- PIN: 680712
- Vehicle registration: KL-

Madayikonam is a village in Irinjalakuda municipality of Thrissur district in the state of Kerala, India.

== Demographics ==
As of 2011 India census, Madayikonam had a population of 14,155 with 6,622 males and 7,533 females.
