= Chathakudam =

- village
- Location in Kerala, India Chathakudam (India)
- Coordinates: 10°26′0″N 76°14′30″E
- Country: India
- State: Kerala
- District: Thrissur

Languages
  - Official: Malayalam, English
- Time zone: UTC+5:30 (IST)
- PIN: 680562
- Telephone code: 234
- Vehicle registration: KL-08/KL45
- Coastline: 0 kilometres (0 mi)
- Nearest city: cherpu
- Lok Sabha constituency: thrissur
- Avg. summer temperature: 35 °C (95 °F)
- Avg. winter temperature: 25 °C (77 °F)

Chathakudam is a village in Thrissur district, Kerala, India.

== Location ==
Chathakudam is 13 kilometers from Thrissur and lies en route Thrissur to Kodungallur. 18 routes of bus service are available from Thrissur to Chathakudam. Alternatively, one can board a bus towards Irinjalakuda or Kodungallur, get down at Poochinipadam and take an auto rickshaw to Chathakudam. This village is approximately 5 kilometers from Amballur-Pudukkadu on NH 47. Chathakudam is known for its temple and festivities.

== Temples ==
Chathakudam Sree Dharma Sastha Temple is the main landmark of the village. The village is surrounded with acres of paddy fields and almost 200 houses. Its population is nearly 5000 residents.

== Festivals ==
Chathakudam Pooram is the most popular one in Peruvanam-Arattupuzha Poorams. Chathakudam Sastha's Pooram is the first pooram in these festivals and historically it is known as Sastha's "Thiruvathira Purappadu" On Thiruvathira day of Meenam month. After this pooram, people believed that Chathakudam Sastha will be going to lead and participate in Arattupuzha Pooram, Peruvanam, Thikkattuseery, Thottippal pooram etc. This 10-day festival ends after Arattupuzha Pooram. Chathakuadm Sree Dharma Sastha is the main participant in Devamela of Arattupuzha with Urakam ammathiruvadi.
