= Mattathur =

Mattathur മറ്റത്തൂർ
- Village
- Location in Kerala, India Mattathur (India)
- Coordinates: 10°22′45″N 76°19′15″E
- Country: India
- State: Kerala
- District: Thrissur

Government
  - Body: Mattathur Grama Panchayath

Population (2011)
  - Total: 30,718

Languages
  - Official: Malayalam, English
- Time zone: UTC+5:30 (IST)
- PIN: 680XXX
- Area code: 0480
- Vehicle registration: KL-
- Nearest city: Chalakudy

Mattathur is a village in Thrissur district in the Indian state of Kerala.

== Demographics ==
As of 2011 Census of India, Mattathur had a population of 30,718 with 14,615 males and 16,103 females.
