= Pattikkad, Thrissur =

Junction in Kerala, India

Pattikkad
- town
- Location in Kerala, India Pattikkad (India)
- Coordinates: 10°33′0″N 76°20′0″E
- Country: India
- State: Kerala
- District: Thrissur

Government
  - Body: Pananchery Grama Panchayat

Languages
  - Official: Malayalam, English
- Time zone: UTC+5:30 (IST)
- PIN: 680652
- Telephone code: 0487
- Vehicle registration: KL-08
- Niyamasabha constituency: Ollur
- Lok Sabha constituency: Thrissur
- Climate: Tropical monsoon (Köppen)
- Avg. summer temperature: 35 °C (95 °F)
- Avg. winter temperature: 20 °C (68 °F)

Pattikkad or Pattikad is a town in Thrissur district of Kerala, India, located on National Highway 544. It is the sixth ward of Pananchery gram panchayat.

== Location ==
Pattikkad is situated about 15 km north-east of Thrissur, 19 km from Vadakkenchery and 7 km from Peechi Dam and the Power Grid Corporation of India.

== Transportation ==
National Highway 544 (India) [Earlier NH-47], a six lane highway passes through Pattikkad. Kerala State Road Transport Corporation and private buses are available to Thrissur, Palakkad (towards the east), Elanad, Govindapuram, Pollachi, and Peechi sides.
