= Porathissery =

Village in Kerala, India

- village
- Interactive map of Porathissery
- Country: India
- State: Kerala
- District: Thrissur

Government
  - Type: Municipal Council
  - Body: Irinjalakuda Municipality

Population (2011)
  - Total: 16,768

Languages
  - Official: Malayalam, English
- Time zone: UTC+5:30 (IST)
- PIN: 6XXXXX
- Vehicle registration: KL-

Porathissery is a village in Irinjalakuda municipality Thrissur district in the state of Kerala, India.

== Demographics ==
As of the 2011 Indian census, Porathissery had a population of 16,768 with 7,829 males and 8,939 females. There were 1,522 children below the age of 6.

Of the 16,768 people in Porathissery, 72.84% of the population were Hindu, 21.89% were Christian, 5.21% were Muslim, 0.02% stated other, and 0.04% did not provide their religion.
