= Manavalassery =

Manavalassery Irinjalakuda and Thanissery (modern)
- Municipality, village
- Location in Kerala, India
- Coordinates: 10°21′52″N 76°10′41″E
- Country: India
- State: Kerala
- District: Thrissur

Government
  - Type: Nagarpalika Panchayati raj (India)
  - Body: Municipality, Gram panchayat

Population (2011)
  - Total: 7,364

Languages
  - Official: Malayalam, English
- Time zone: UTC+5:30 (IST)
- PIN: 6XXXXX
- Vehicle registration: KL-

Manavalassery is a village in Thrissur district in the state of Kerala, India.

== Demographics ==
As of 2011 India census, Manavalassery had a population of 7364 with 3355 males and 4009 females.
