= Kallettumkara =

- Village
- Location in Kerala, India
- Coordinates: 10°20′0″N 76°16′0″E
- Country: India
- State: Kerala
- District: Thrissur

Government
  - Body: Aloor Grama Panchayath, Muriyad Grama Panchayath

Population (2011)
  - Total: 7,097

Languages
  - Official: Malayalam
- Time zone: UTC+5:30 (IST)
- PIN: 680683
- Telephone code: 480
- Vehicle registration: KL-45
- Nearest towns: Irinjalakuda, Chalakudy and Thrissur
- Lok Sabha constituency: Thrissur
- Vidhan Sabha constituency: Irinjalakuda
- Climate: Seasonal (Köppen)

Kallettumkara is a village which is the epi-centre town of Aloor Panchayat and is in Thrissur district in the state of Kerala. Kaletumkara is the Western border of newly formed Chalakudy Taluk although it elects it Legislative Assembly Candidate from Irinjalakuda Constituency, India. Kalletumkara is popular as the place where Irinjalakuda Railway Station is located and is 8 km (5.0 mi) away from the Irinjalakuda Town. There is an interesting story behind how this place got this special name. A river called 'Kallar' (കല്ലാറ്) used to flow through the said land. The land on the banks (kara) (കര) of the river Kallar came to be known as 'Kallarin kara' (കല്ലാറിൻ കര). In Malayalam, the word 'Aar' (ആറ്) has a synonym 'Aatt' (ആറ്റ്). Hence the place was also known as 'Kallatin Kara' (കല്ലാറ്റിൻ കര). Later, the name evolved into 'Kallettinkara' (കല്ലേറ്റിൻക്കര) and later 'Kallettumkara' (കല്ലേറ്റുംക്കര). Later, due to an earthquake, the river changed its course. And there is no river flowing through Kallettumkara presently. This is the story behind the name of the place as said by the localites.
