= Thalapilly =

- Town
- Location in Kerala, India
- Coordinates: 10°35′0″N 76°5′0″E
- Country: India
- State: Kerala
- District: Thrissur

Languages
  - Official: Malayalam, English
- Time zone: UTC+5:30 (IST)
- Telephone code: 04884, 04885
- Vehicle registration: KL-48
- Nearest city: Thrissur
- Lok Sabha constituency: Alathur

Thalapilly is one of the Taluks in Thrissur District of Kerala state, South India. The Headquarters of the Taluk is Wadakancherry. The Wadakkanchery Municipality, And The Following Panchayats Thekkumkara, Mullurkara, Varavoor, Chelakkara, Pazhayannur, Thiruvilwamala, Panjal, Kondazhi, Vallathol Nagar and Desamangalam are in Thalapilly Taluk.

There are long chains of small hills throughout the Taluk while vast stretches of paddy fields and many Palmyra palms also feature in the landscape.

== See also ==
- Manalithara
- Vadakkethara
- Viruppakka
