= Thekkumkara =

Thekkumkara machad
- village
- Interactive map of Thekkumkara
- Country: India
- State: Kerala
- District: Thrissur

Population (2011)
  - Total: 15,258

Languages
  - Official: Malayalam, English
- Time zone: UTC+5:30 (IST)
- PIN: 680608
- Vehicle registration: KL-8,KL-48
- Nearest city: Thrissur
- Lok Sabha constituency: Alathur
- Vidhan Sabha constituency: Wadakkanchery

Thekkumkara is a village in Thrissur district in the state of Kerala, India.

== Demographics ==
As of 2011 India census, Thekkumkara had a population of 15258 with 7110 males and 8148 females.

== Tourist Attraction in Tekkumkara ==
1) Machad Mamangam

2) Vazhani Dam

3) Pattathippara Falls

4) Cheppara hillstation

5) St Antony's Church Machad

6) Poomala Dam
