= Conolly Canal =

Canal in India

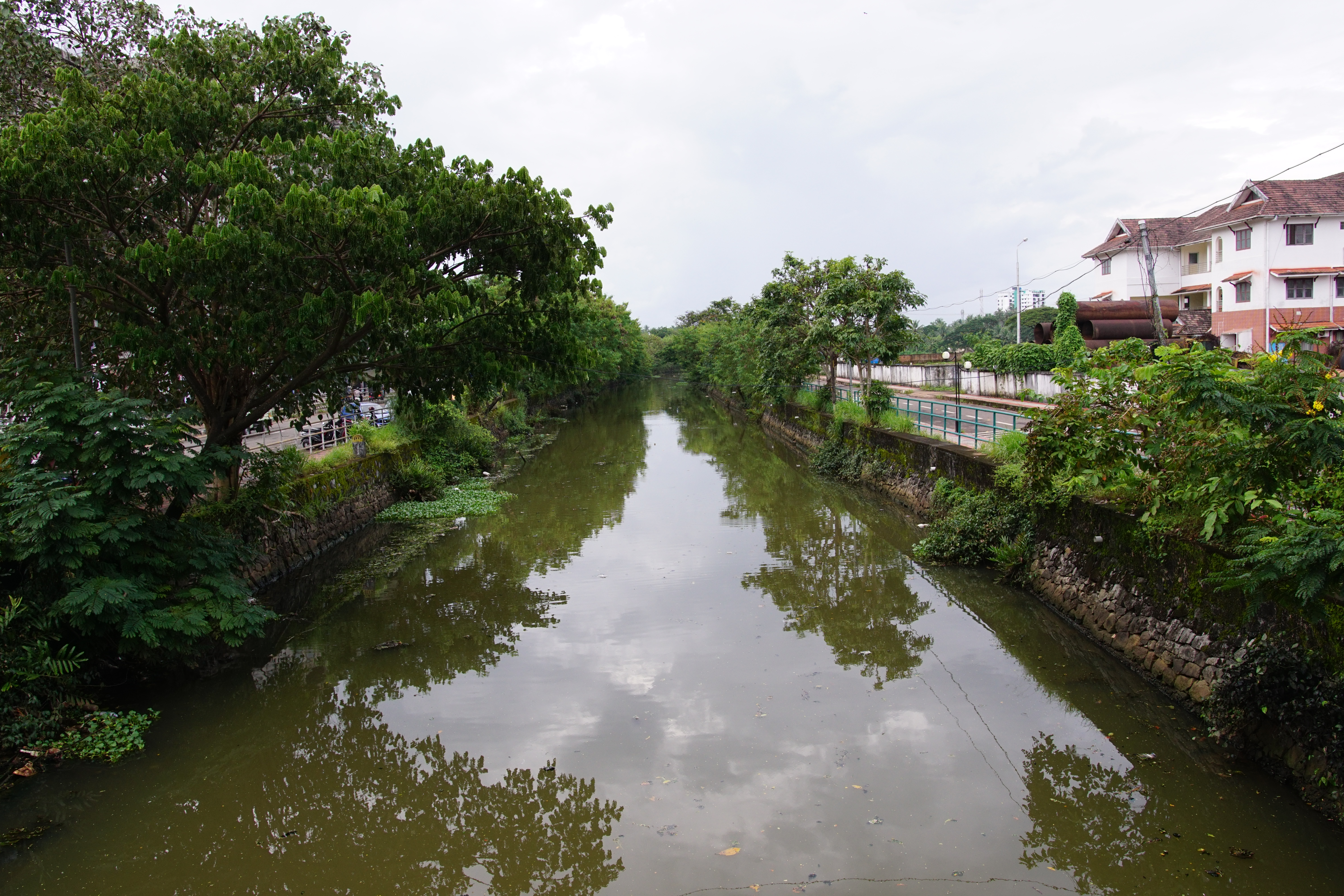
Connolly Canal seen near Chavakkad

Conolly Canal, sometimes spelled as Canoly Canal, is the part of the West coast canal (WCC) network of Kerala and the canal was constructed by combining the rivers and streams along the coast with the intention of creating a vast waterway from Kozhikode to Kochi. It was constructed in the year 1848 under the orders of then collector of Malabar, H.V. Conolly, initially to facilitate movement of goods to Kallayi Port from hinter lands of Malabar through Kuttiyadi and Korapuzha river systems.

The construction was from 1848 to 1850. The canal was built almost entirely by human labour at a time when no machinery was in place. The Canoly Canal connects various rivers and streams including the Korapuzha river in the north and the Kallai River in the south thus forming part of the line of water communication from Vadakara to Beypore. The width of the canal varies between 6 and 20 metres (20 to 65 ft), and the water depth during the monsoon ranges between 0.5 and 2 metres (1.5 to 6 ft).

This was the main waterway for the cargo movement between Kochi and Calicut, trade was the definition of the Canolly canal for more than a century. Major coastal towns such as Chavakkad, Ponnani and Kandassankadavu developed because of the freight trade along the canal. The main products of the coastal line, coconut oil and coconut fibre (Chakiri), were transported to Cochin by using "kettuvallam" (old house boat) through this canal. Many of the things in the once popular Chavakkadu Kuttakkunnu weekly market came through the Canolly Canal. Even the lives of ordinary people were associated with the canal. They used the water of cannoli for all purposes except drinking. The main dependence of the coastal settlers was for bathing and washing clothes. Fishing was also active in small ponds. The sides of most of the canal are lined with dimension stone, but at some locations the lining has collapsed. In a number of places along the canal, trees and bushes and water plants have grown, causing the water flow in the middle stretch of the canal to become weaker.

The Canoly Canal Development Samithi in Kozhikode had decided to start speedboat service on the canal from Karaparamba to the Sarovaram park site in September 2009.

== Course ==
The course of Canoly Canal from Kozhikkode to Kodungallur (Kottapuram) of around 170 km is today part of National Waterway 3 through the National Waterways Act, 2016. It's a part of 630 km long Western Coastal canal (WCC) project in Malabar Coast.

- The Northern extend of Canoly Canal is Vatakara near the mouth of Kuttiady river.
- From there it takes the course of Kuttiyadi river upstream till Thurayur or Payyoli Cherppu. (5 km further upstream on Kuttiady river at Cherandathur, the Vadakara- Mahe canal projects starts. Once that project materialises, Canoli Canal will have navigable access further north up to Mahé, India)
- At Thurayur the canal takes a man made course up till Akalappuzha backwaters. From Akalapuzha through east of Koyilandy town the Canoli Canal take the course of various channels of Korapuzha river system.
- Canoli canal leaves the Korapuzha system and enters its man-made urban stretch at Eranhikkal near Elathur, Kozhikode. From there the canal travels next 11.5-km through Kozhikode city till it reaches Kallayi River. During its course through this stretch the canal is severely encroached and polluted. There had been lot of revival projects around 2017. The famous Sarovaram Bio Park is along this stretch. In city Canoli canal travel through areas such as Kunduparamba, Karaparamba, Eranhipalam, Arayidathupalam Junction, Puthiyara, Mooriyad and Mankavu.The Mini Bypass road of Kozhikode city traverse nearly parallel to the Canoli Canal. On entering the Kozhikode city limits, Canoly Canal is an apology for a water way, it is a cess pool of drainage, untreated sewage and other domestic waste. The consistency turns into a thick, dark slow moving mass with strong odour as it passes along the mini bye pass from Karaparambu to Arayidathupalam. Huge amounts are spent annually to clean and make it navigable but in vain.
- From Kallayi river near Mankavu canal begins its southward extension. This man made stretch of canal joining Chaliyar and Kallai River passes through Olavanna Cheruvannur Nallalam and at Kolathara the canal meets Chaliyar river.
- In Chaliyar river the canal travels downstream till Chaliyam-Beypore port through Feroke and then from Beypore it takes upstream of another channel on Chaliyar river drainage system through Karuvanthuruthy and Mannoor tiil Kallaampara.
- From Kallaampara, Canoli canal then takes a man made channel of 2 km into Kadalundi River system by joining it near Athanickal which is 1.5 km upstream of Kottakadavu bridge (This bridge is an important landmark it connects Parappanangadi with Chaliyam and Feroke. Before this bridge coming into being water transport was the easiest way to get to Beypore from Parappanangadi. Down stream of this bridge comes the famous mangrove system that houses Kadalundi Bird Sanctuary.
- The canal then continues for the next 25 km of its course through Kadalundi River till Poorapuzha that's 3 km north of Tanur. In this journey the initial 19 km is upstream till Chuzhali through the main distributary of Kadalundi river that forms river mouth near Kadalundi town. From Chuzhali the next 6 km of the course is through down stream in another distributary of Kadalundi river that form river mouth near Ottumpuram bridge.
- Next 18 km is one of the most longest man-made stretch of the canal. It begins from near Pariyapuram on Kadalundi River and ends at Tirur puzha near Koottayi, Tirur. This stretch passes through western side of Tanur. There's heavy siltation, waste dumping, encroachments and presence of numerous low lying cross structures along this reach of the canal.
- The canal then goes southwards through Tirur puzha from Koottayi for the next 8 km till it meets the mouth of Bharathappuzha at Ponnani At this area the course of Canoli canal meets the course of TS Canal. From Ponnani to Kodungallur they both along with National Waterway 3 share the same course.
- From Ponnani the canal travel through an artificial channel for 4.5 km till it meets Biyyam Kayal near Puthuponnani.
- After travelling 1 km through Biyyam Kayal, the canal again starts its man-made stretch, the longest stretch of all for a length of 29 km until it meets Chettuva Backwater. In this stretch the canal pass through Chavakkad. In past access to the canal brought huge trade and allied developments for Chavakkad market.
  - South of Chavakkad the canal begins to enter the Northern Kole Wetlands region. Kole Wetlands is a Ramsar site, that is one of the rice bowls of Kerala along with Kuttanad and Palakkad.
  - Kole Wetlands are fed primarily by Karuvannur River (also called as Puzhakkal River, Thannikudam river etc.) and Keecheri River. The Biyyam kayal and Kanjiramukku rivers forms its northern boundary, Chalakudy River forms its southern boundaries and Canoli canal flows through its western boundary
- From Chettuva Backwater the canal enters into a series of natural courses through the Kole region of Thrissur. The initial stretch is it travels for 6 km through upstream of Northern distributary of Karuvannur River from Chettuva Backwater till it reaches Enamakkal Lake.
- From Enamakkal Lake the canal travels down stream of the Southern distributary of Karuvannur River and other rivulets through Kole region for almost 45 km until it meets Periyar (river) near Kodungallur.
  - In this stretch 4 km south of Enamakkal Lake the canal reaches Kandassankadavu. This area was also economically benefitted a lot because of trade and freight movement that happened through Canoli canal in the past.
  - Almost 25 km south of Kandassankadavu near Padiyoor, there is a small canal from Canoli canal towards Irinjalakuda town.
- The southern extend of Canoly Canal is Kodungallur where it meets the Periyar (river) system and Kottapuram - Kollam stretch of National Waterway 3.

== Canal city project ==
In February 2026, a new bridge across the Conolly Canal was inaugurated at Puthiyapalam, which will enable easier access to the railway station, Palayam, Thali and Kallai. ₹73.21 crore had been sanctioned for the first phase development of this Canal City project. Conolly Canal is part of the National Waterway, and the bridge has been designed with the required vertical clearance.

As per an article in Kozhikode news, "The Kozhikode Canal City project is a transformative infrastructure initiative set to begin in 2026 with an estimated cost of ₹1,118 crore. It aims to revive and develop the historic Conolly Canal as a vibrant 14-meter-wide urban waterway, boosting tourism and improving goods transport in the region."

== See also ==
- Waterways transport in Kerala
- National Waterway 3
- TS Canal
- Wetlands in indian cities
