= Chetuva =

Indian coastal district

Chettuva Chettuva
- village
- Location in Kerala, India Chettuva (India)
- Coordinates: 10°33′30″N 76°2′5″E
- Country: India
- State: Kerala
- District: Trichur

Languages
  - Official: Malayalam, English
- Time zone: UTC+5:30 (IST)
- PIN: 680616
- Telephone code: 0487
- Vehicle registration: KL-75
- Nearest city: Chavakkad
- Lok Sabha constituency: Thrissur
- Vidhan Sabha constituency: Guruvayur

Chettuva (Portuguese: Chatuá) is a coastal village in Thrissur district, Kerala, India. Chettuva is located 25 km from Thrissur. The Chettuva Backwaters start at Enamakkal Lake and empties to Arabian Sea.Erstwhile film director Ramu Kariat,Famous Malayalam Poet Chettuva Pareekutty,Lanchi Velayudhan were prominent people from Chettuva.Lanchi Velayudhan have helped many to reach in Dubai in 90's with his boat.Chettuva is home to Chettuva Juma Masjid, Chettuva Fakir Sahib Jaram, and many other mosques, making it an important religious and cultural centre. In 2011, construction of a harbour, with a view to tap fishing wealth was started.The area is surrounded by backwaters, mangroves, and canals, making it scenic and ecologically rich.Chettuva is believed to be an ancient port town, active in maritime trade centuries ago

== Major attractions ==
- William Fort
- Chettuva Bungalow
- Rajah Islands
- Chettuva Harbour
- Chettuva Juma Masjid
- Chettuva Back Water
- Mangrove Forest
