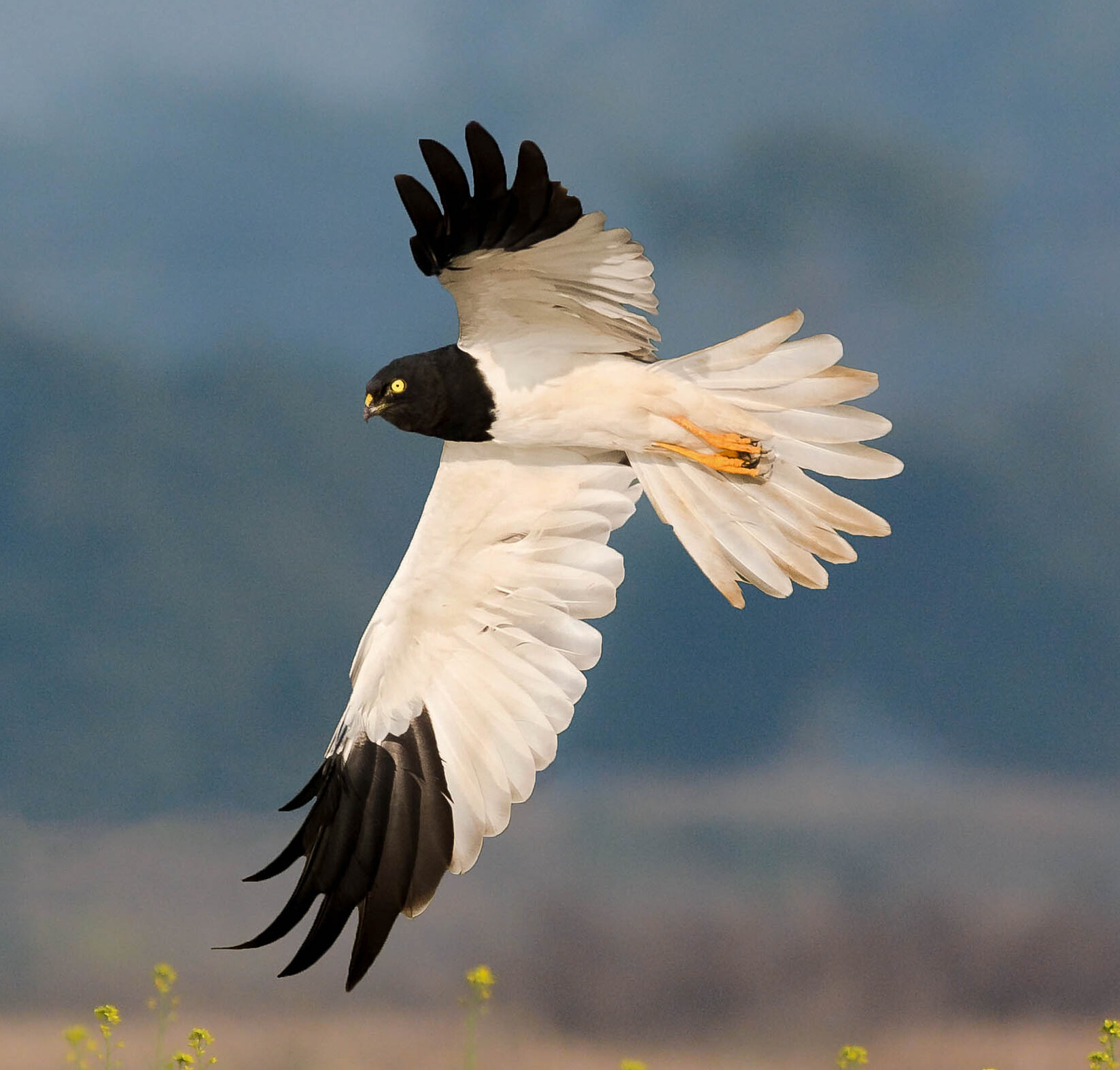

Conservation status
- Least Concern (IUCN 3.1)

Scientific classification
- Kingdom: Animalia
- Phylum: Chordata
- Class: Aves
- Order: Accipitriformes
- Family: Accipitridae
- Genus: Circus
- Species: C. melanoleucos

Binomial name
- Circus melanoleucos (Pennant, 1769)

= Pied harrier =

Species of bird

The pied harrier (Circus melanoleucos) is a bird of prey in the family Accipitridae, named for the male's distinctive white and black colouration.

It is a migratory bird endemic to Asia, ranging roughly from southern Siberia to the Philippines. They are primarily solitary although will sometimes form loose groups. They mostly live in open country and eat small mammals.

== Description ==
The pied harrier is a medium-sized raptor. They measure 41-49cm (16 – 19 in) from the end of the tail to tip of the beak. Adult males weigh 265–325g, while adult females weigh 390–455g.

They perch on reeds, posts, or on the ground, rarely on trees. Their wings reach far down their tail but not past the tip.

The male is black on the head, neck, back, breast, and primary flight feathers, and white on the forewing, rump, and the rest of its underparts. It has striking yellow eyes.

The female is similar looking to that of Montagu's harrier. It is generally dark brown above and pale brown to white below with dark streaking, and a small white rump. Unlike the male, it generally has brown eyes.

The juvenile pied harrier resembles a juvenile Montagu's harrier. It Is darker above than an adult female, with rich cinnamon colouring below.

In flight, the pied harrier most closely resembles a hen harrier in size and shape. Their wings are slightly rounded at the tips, longish and narrow. The tail is long and rounded.

This species flies buoyantly like other harriers, with a few leisurely wingbeats interspersed with glides. It glides and soars with its wings in a shallow V shape.

== Habitat and Distribution ==
The pied harrier's breeding range extends east roughly from Lake Baikal in southern Siberia through Mongolia and Northeast China, as far south as North Korea. Their wintering range is from eastern India and Sri Lanka, through South East Asia to the Philippines and Borneo. Their habitat in the north is primarily steppes or boggy birch scrubs and in the south they spend their time in paddy fields and swamps. They prefer open habitat but can tolerate a certain degree of bush cover.

They are found at altitudes ranging from sea level to elevations of up to 2100m, but normally breed at under 1500m.

=== Movement ===
These harriers move south mainly from September to October, and back North from March to May. Some individuals may stay North in years where voles are abundant. There are also some year round populations in northeastern India (Assam) and Myanmar. Vagrants have been seen in Japan.

== Behavior ==
=== Vocalizations ===
The male gives repeated "kiiy yeee" calls and the females gives a rapid "kee-kee-kee" when displaying. If alarmed or disturbed near the nest the female may give a rapid chattering "chak-chak-chak-chak". They are otherwise generally silent, apart from an occasional anxious "wek wek wek".

=== Diet ===
Pied harriers primarily eat small mammals such as shrews and mice, and especially voles. They will occasionally eat small birds such as larks and pipits, and sometimes frogs, lizards, snakes, and insects such as beetles or grasshoppers. They have also been observed eating carrion.

When hunting, pied harriers fly low and survey the terrain meticulously.

=== Breeding/Reproduction ===
This is a ground-nesting species, building nests primarily out of grass and other plant matter. The nests are thin and 40-50cm (16-20in) wide.

The female lays 4-5 eggs in a breeding season at 2 day intervals, and is primarily responsible for incubation which takes 30+ days.

Courtship involves aerial displays such as high circling, the male diving at the female, undulating sky dances, and food passes. The male is noisy during display.

=== Sociality ===
These birds are primarily solitary, but may form loose groups at roosts or ideal feeding locations, as well as during migration.

== Taxonomy ==
The Pied harrier was first formally described in 1769 by Thomas Pennant in Sri Lanka, originally placed in the genus Falco before later being placed the genus Circus which was introduced by Lacépède in 1799.

Circus comes from the Greek word kirkos meaning circle or ring, in reference to the circling flight of members of the genus. Melanoleucos comes from the Greek words melas and leucos, meaning black and white respectively. This refers to the colouration of the adult male, and parallels the common name of pied harrier. "Pied" is commonly used to describe animals with a black and white pattern.

== Population/Conservation ==
The pied harrier is ranked as least concern according to the IUCN, although the population is thought to be decreasing, likely due to drainage and agricultural development. In 1986, over 14500 were counted flying over northeast China during a migration period. More research on population size and threats would be valuable.

In South Korea it is listed as an endangered species.

== Gallery ==
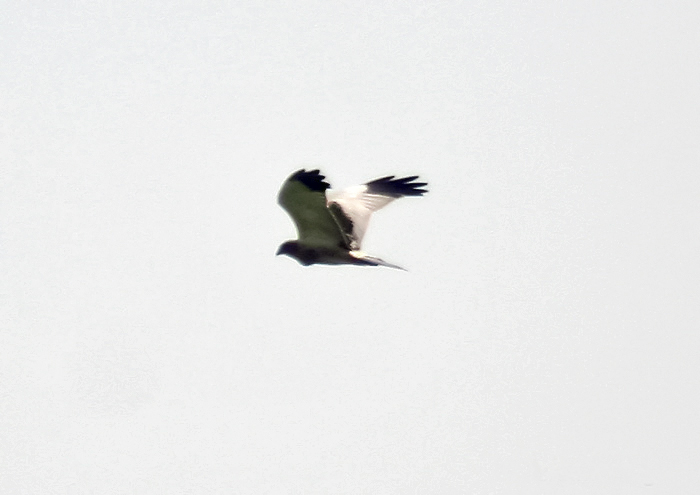
near Hodal in Faridabad District of Haryana, India.

Male from Kole Wetlands, Thrissur, Kerala

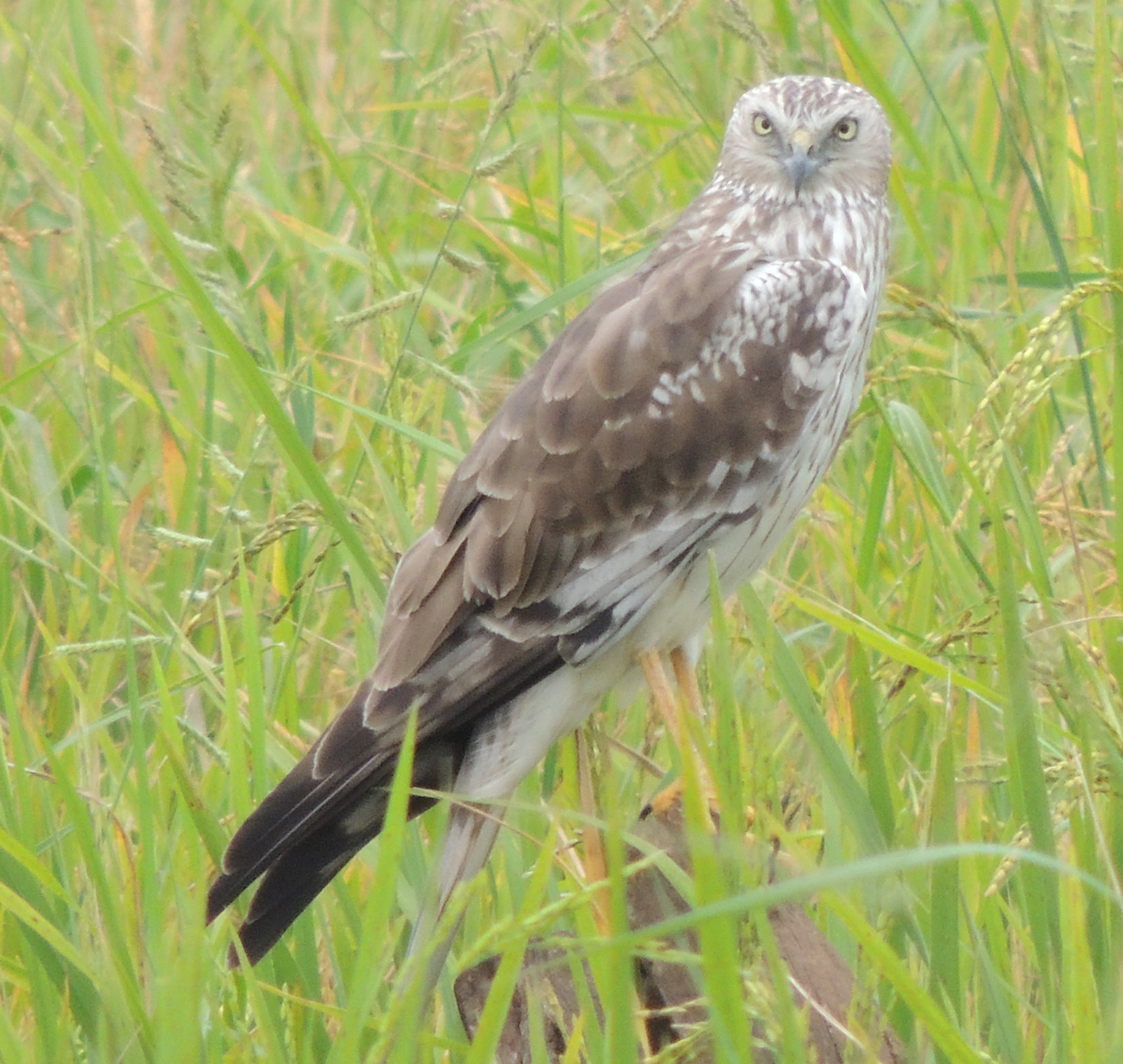
A female pied harrier
