= Thrikkunnathu Mahadeva Temple =

Hindu temple in Kerala, India

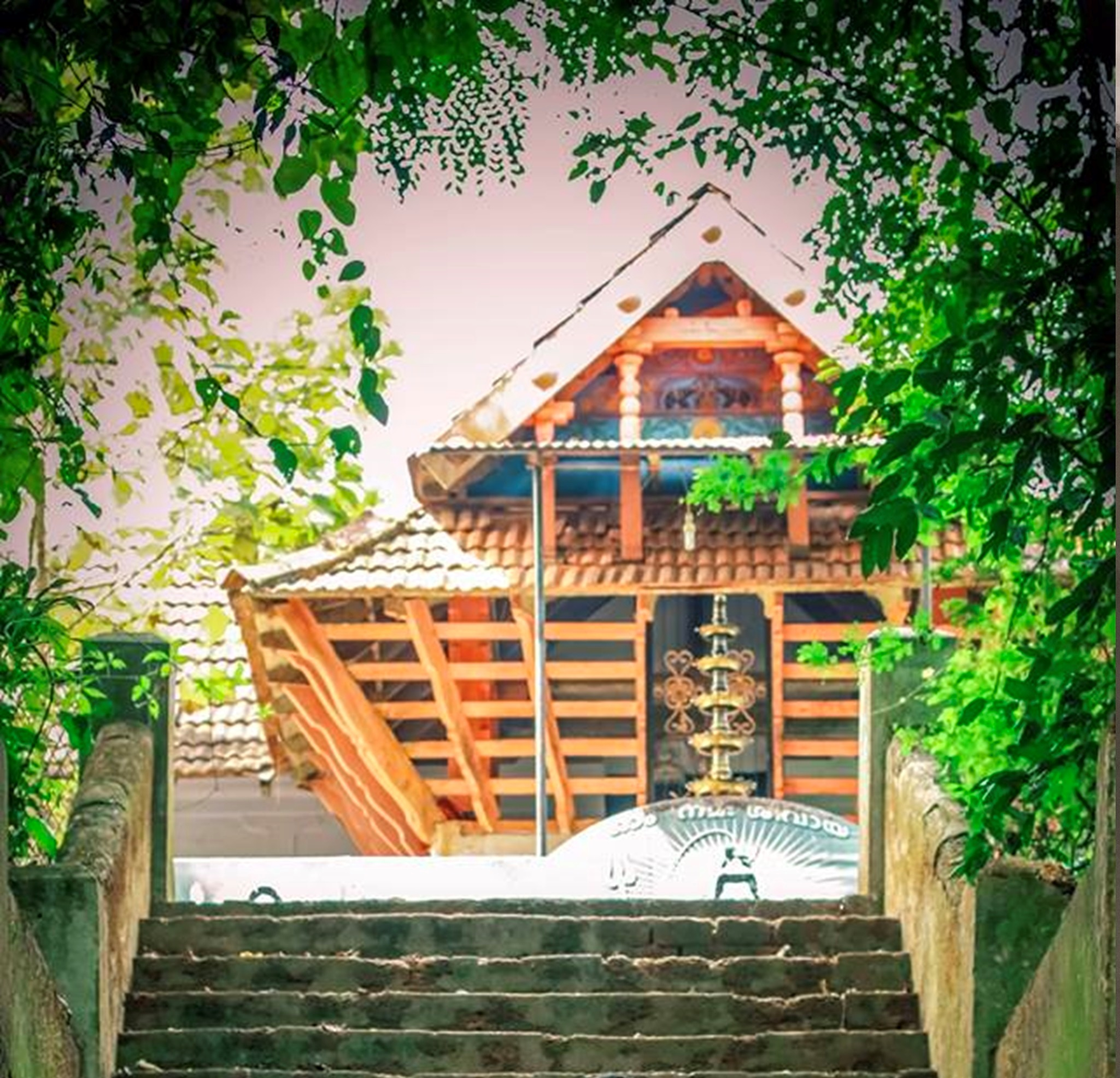
- Temple Entrance

- Thrikkunnathu Mahadeva Temple, Kanjany, Thrissur, Kerala

Religion
- Affiliation: Hinduism
- District: Thrissur
- Deity: Shiva; Lord Maha Vishnu
- Festivals: Maha Shivaratri, Ashtamirohini

Location
- Location: Kanjany
- State: Kerala
- Country: India
- Interactive map of Thrikkunnathu Mahadeva Temple
- Coordinates: 10.480711°N 76.109481°E

Architecture
- Type: Kerala style
- Completed: Not known

Specifications
- Temple: 2
- Elevation: 36.35 m (119 ft)

Thrikkunnathu Mahadeva Temple, located in Kanjany in Thrissur district of Kerala. This temple is a classic example of the Dravidian style of architecture. Thrikkunnathu Mahadeva Temple is situated near to Karuvannur River and the presiding deity of the temple is Shiva, located in main sanctum sanatorium facing east. According to folklore, sage Parasurama has installed the idol. The temple is a part of the 108 famous Shiva temples in Kerala.

== Temple Structure ==
It is believed that the idol of the principal deity here was installed by the Parasurama himself. The Kurumannur river flows nearby brings greenery around the temple. The temple is quite ancient, besides its religious importance, the temple is also surrounded by exquisite surroundings. The temple compound is 2 acres; Sri Mahadeva (Lord Shiva) and Lord Vishnu have been built in a separate temple complex. The temple complex (Nalambalam, Sanctum Santorium) and the lighthouse are built in the Kerala-Dravidian style of architecture.

The Sanctum Sanctorum (Sreekovil) of Shiva temple is round in shape (Vatta Srekovil) roofed with copper sheets and with two inside chambers. Sanctum Sanctorum of Vishnu Temple is in square shape (Chatura Sreekovil) tile roofed and facing west.

== Festival of Temple ==
The temple don't flag mast; so there is no festival one is at the temple of Lord Shiva and other is at Lord Vishnu's temple. The annual temple festival come in Malayalam month of Dhanu.

== Location ==
Temple situated 1 km away from Kanjany Junction in Trissur-Triprayar bus route through Vadanappally.

== See also ==
- 108 Shiva Temples
- Temples of Kerala

== Temple Photos ==
Thrikkunnathu Mahadeva Temple

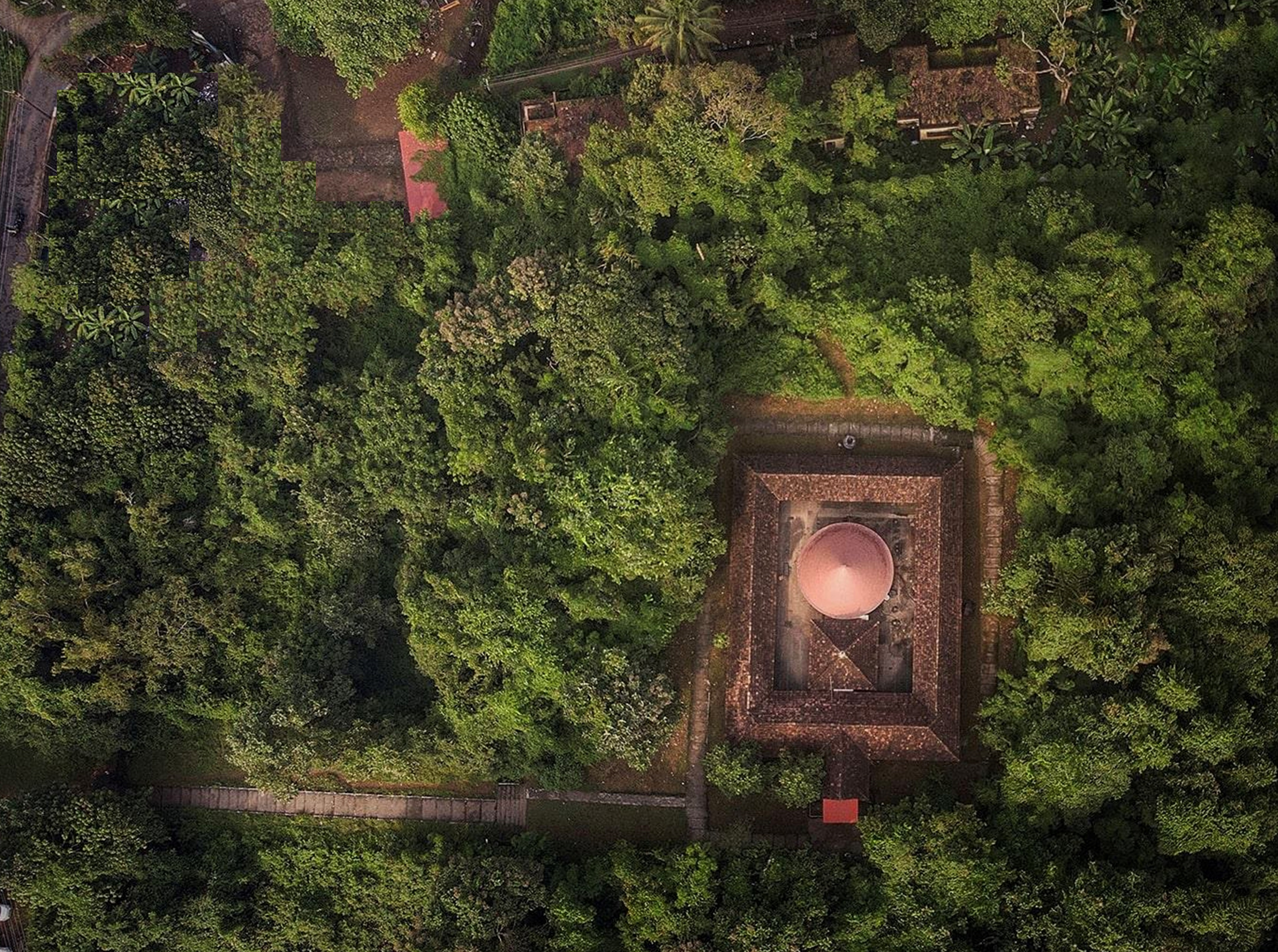
Temple Aerial View

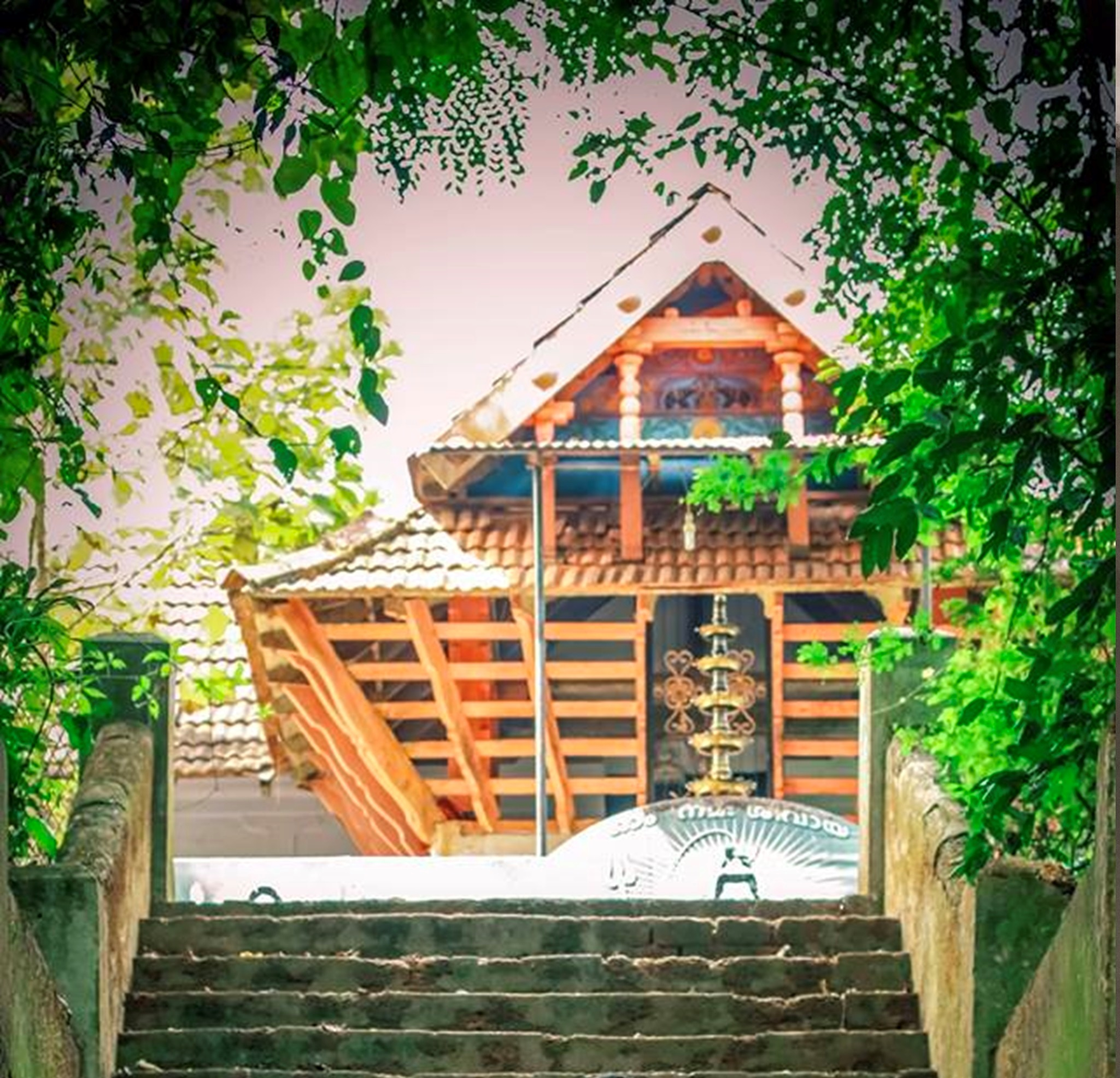
Temple Entrance

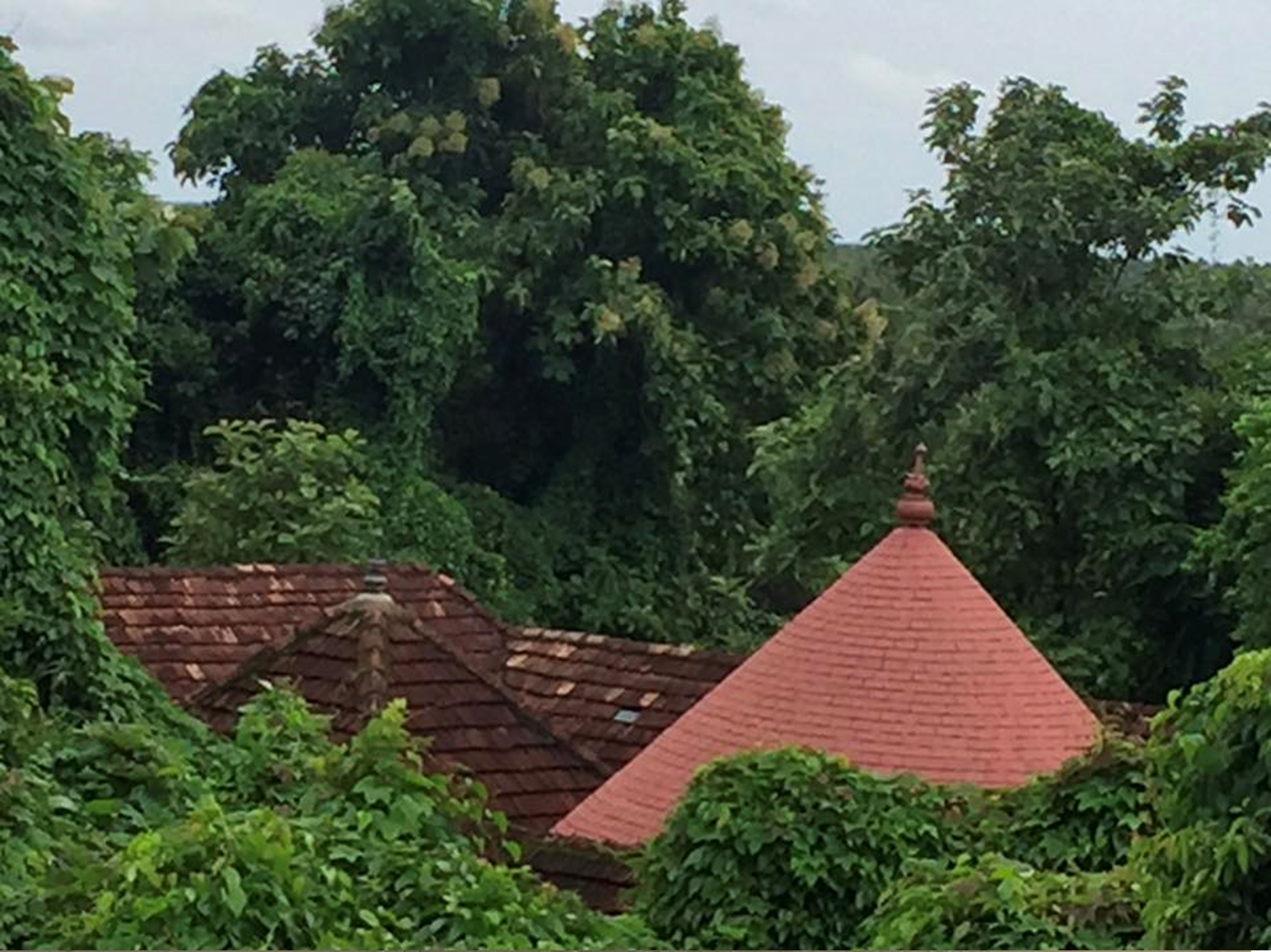
Sreekovil

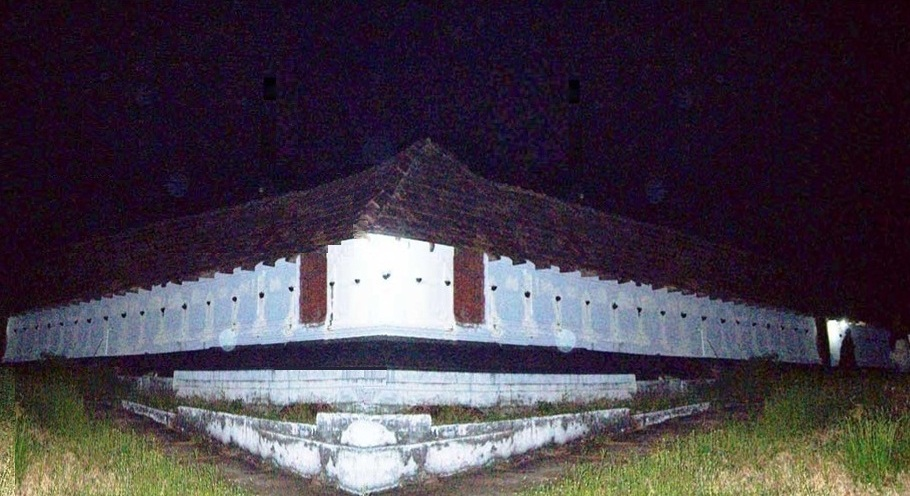
Nalambalam
