= Karuvannur River =

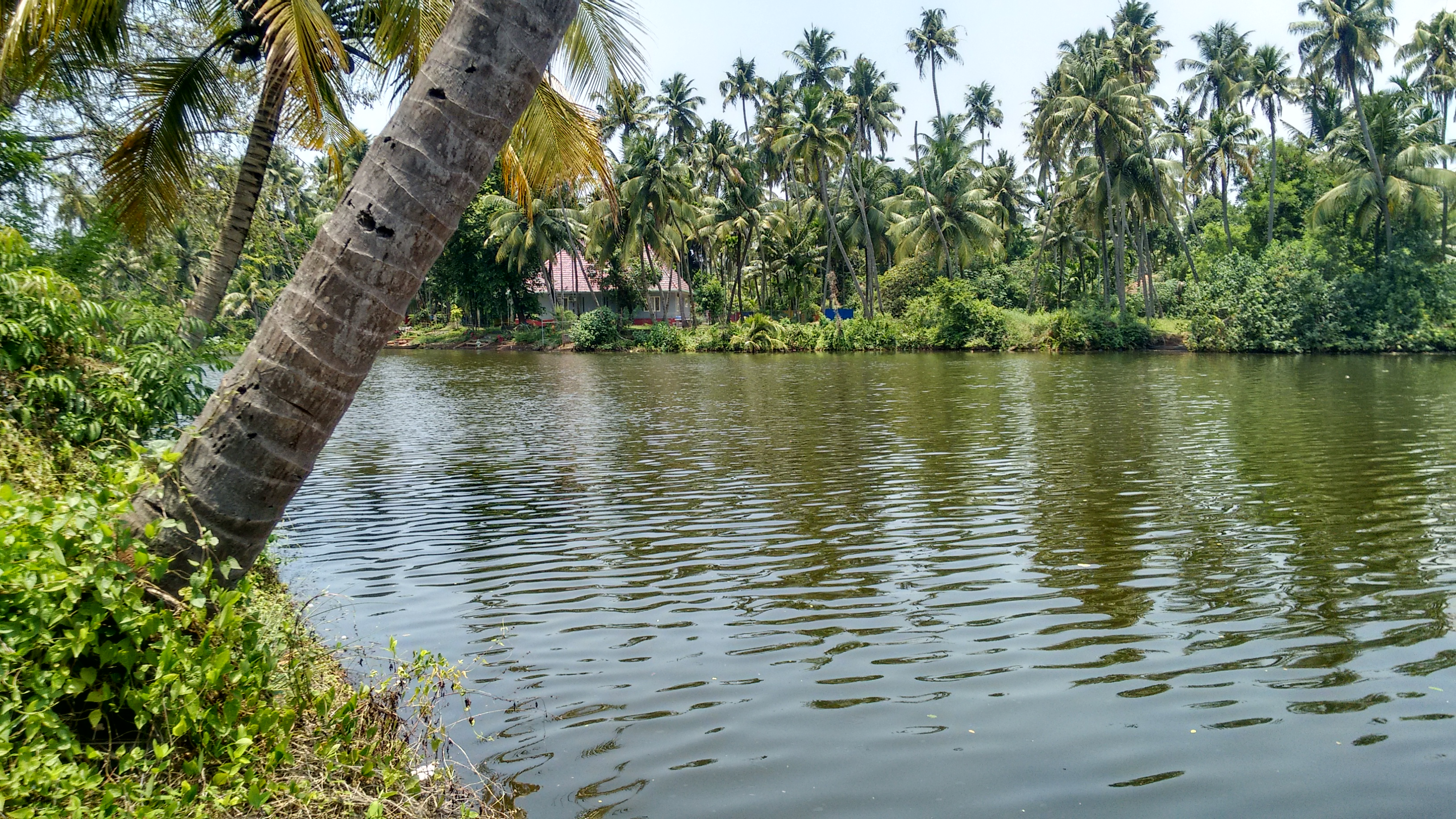

Location
- Country: India

Physical characteristics
- Source
  - location: Pumalai Hills
- Mouth
  - location: Thrissur Kole Wetlands
- Length: 48 km (30 mi)

The Karuvannur River is the fourth largest river in Thrissur District of Kerala. The river is formed by the confluence of the Kurumali river and Manali river.

== Course ==
The river has its origins at Arattupuzha where it is formed by the confluence of the two rivers, Manali River and Kurumali River. Both the rivers merge at Arattupuzha and forms the Karuvannur River. Then the river flows to the Kole wetlands.The river divides the Thrissur Kole Wetlands into two regions, an area of 8,072 hectares in the north is termed as North Kole, and an area of 2,115 hectares in the south is known as South Kole. The river flows west and splits in two, one falling in Enamakkal Lake which joins Conolly Canal in Thrissur District and the other one into Periyar river. The river is 48 kilometres in length, drains an area of 1,054 km^{2} and gives drinking water to many Panchayats in Thrissur District.

== Fauna and flora ==
In 2014, Puzhukkoori fish, which was considered an extinct species for the last 150 years was found in the river by Mathews Plamoottil, Assistant Professor in Zoology, Government College, Chavara.
