= Eranhikkal =

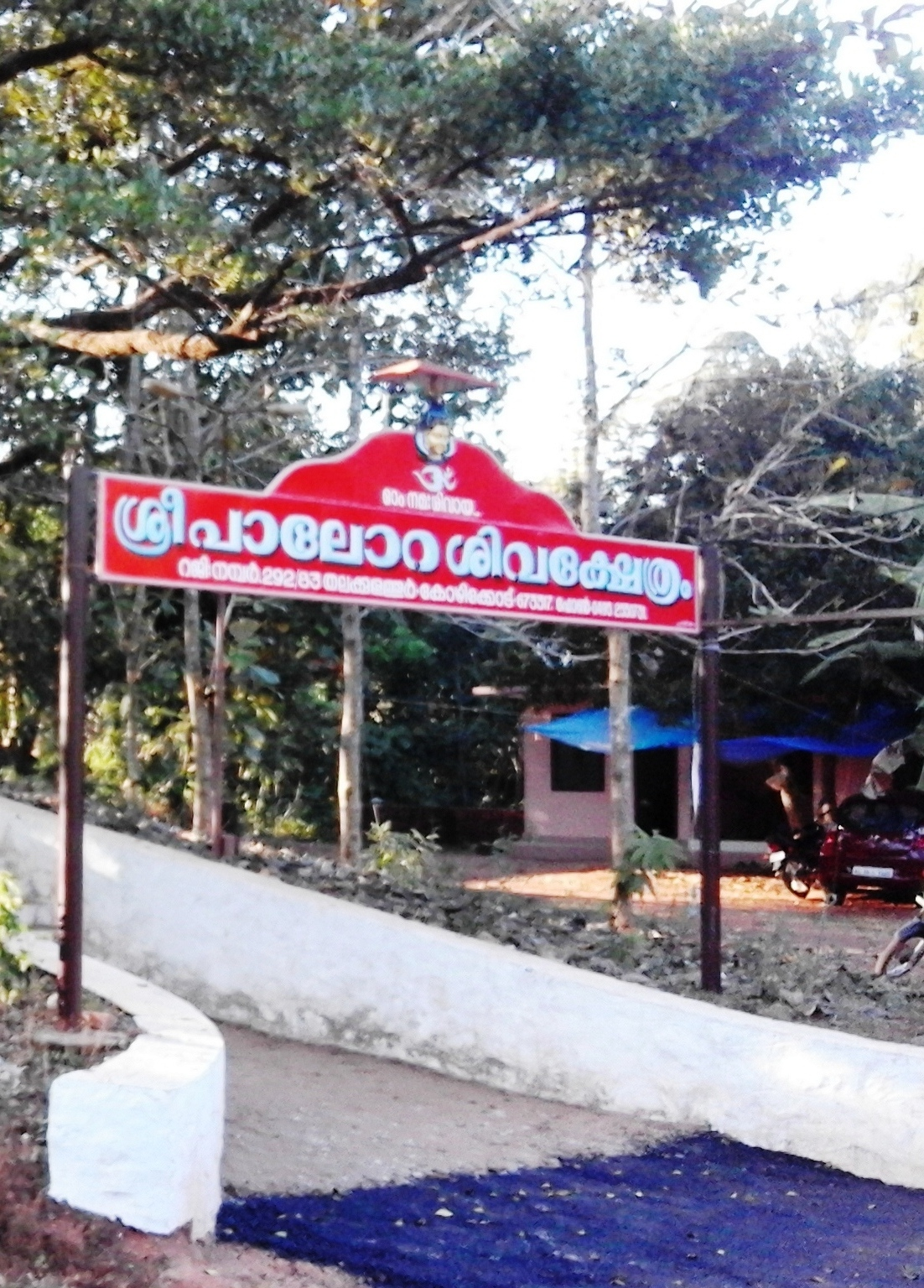
Purakkattiri Temple

Eranhikkal or Eranjikkal is a place in Kozhikode District, Kerala India. It is covered in the Elathur division Of Calicut Municipal Corporation. Conolly Canal meets with the Korapuhha River in Eranhikkal. It is situated just 8 km from Calicut City.

National Highway NH 17 passes through Pavangad just 2 km From Eranhikkal and the NH 17 Calicut bypass also passes through Eranhikkal. The nearest railway stations are Calicut Railway Station, Westhill Railway station, and the Elathur Railway Station.

== Conolly Canal ==
Conolly Canal, named after Henry Valentine Conolly, the collector of Malabar during the British regime, runs through Eranhikkal. It was constructed during his tenure, in 1848, and was used as a major waterway, shipping goods and ferrying passengers in the Calicut district till the late 1950s. It connects Korapuzha to Kallayi River.

== Educational institutions ==
There are many primary schools, including Govt Upper Primary School, Karannur U P School, Hidayathul Islam L P School, and secondary and higher secondary education served by P V S Higher Secondary School.
