= Chettuva Backwater =

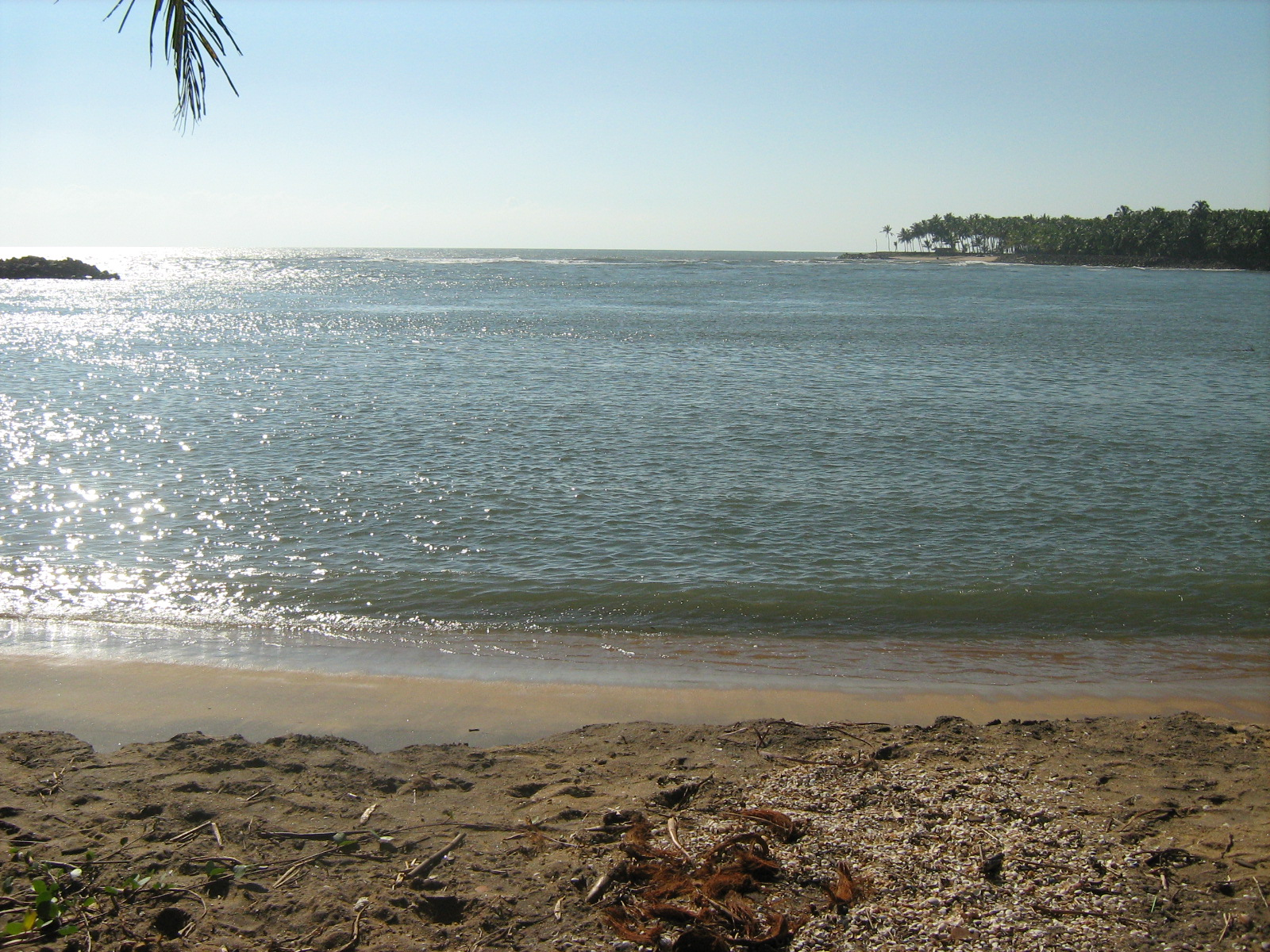
Estuary of Chettuva Backwater in Thrissur District

Chettuva Backwater is located in between Engandiyur Panchayat and Kadappuram Panchayat of Thrissur District in Kerala. The backwaters start at Enamakkal Lake and empties to Arabian Sea. The destination is blessed with mangroves, Chinese fishing nets, islands, migratory birds, estuary and a fort. The mangroves at Chettuva backwaters are famous around the world In 2010, Government of Kerala has declared Chettuva as heritage village.

== Major attractions ==
- William Fort
- Chettuva Bungalow
- Raja Islands
- Chettuva Harbour

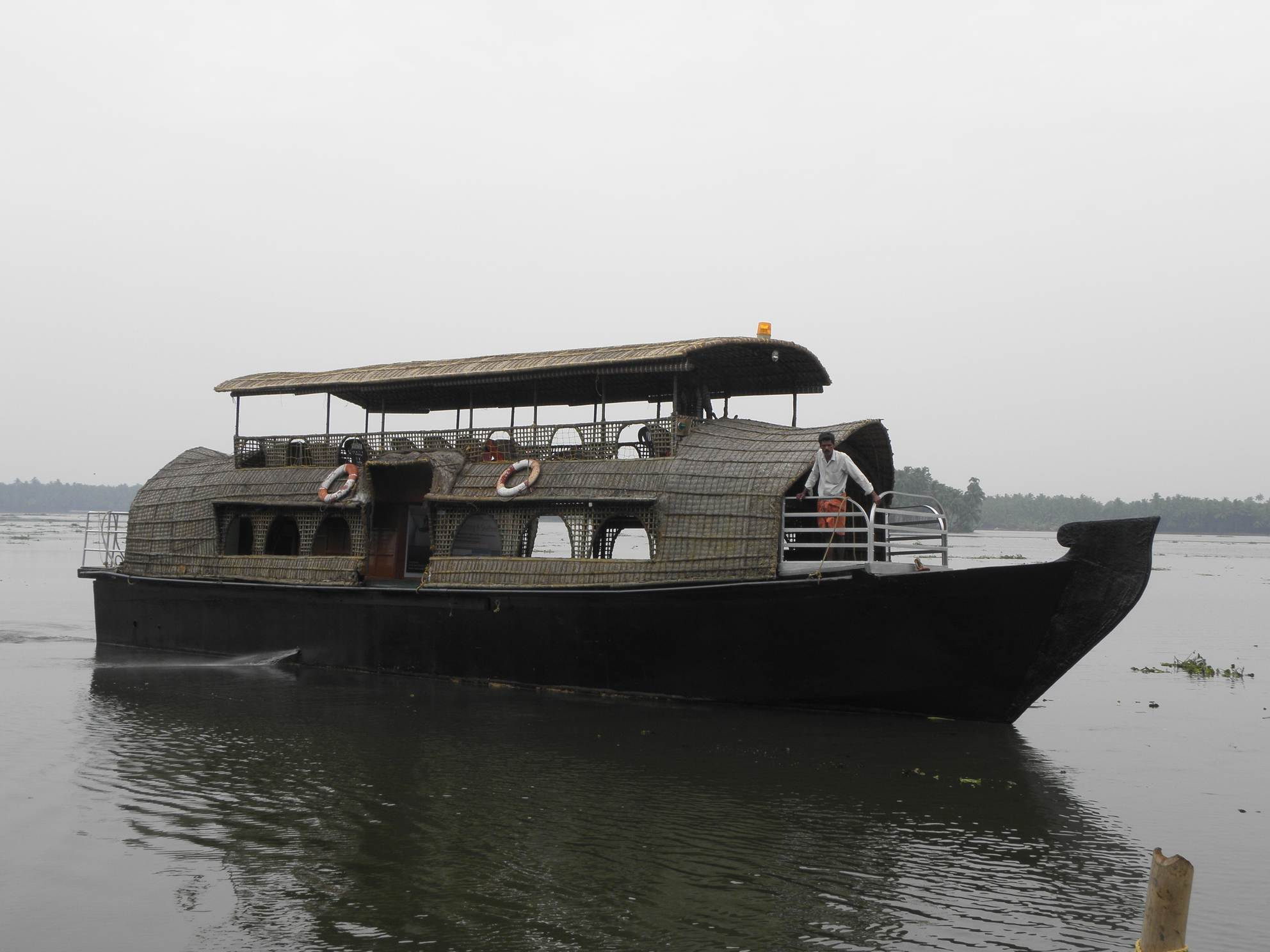
A house boat in the Chettuva backwaters in Thrissur District

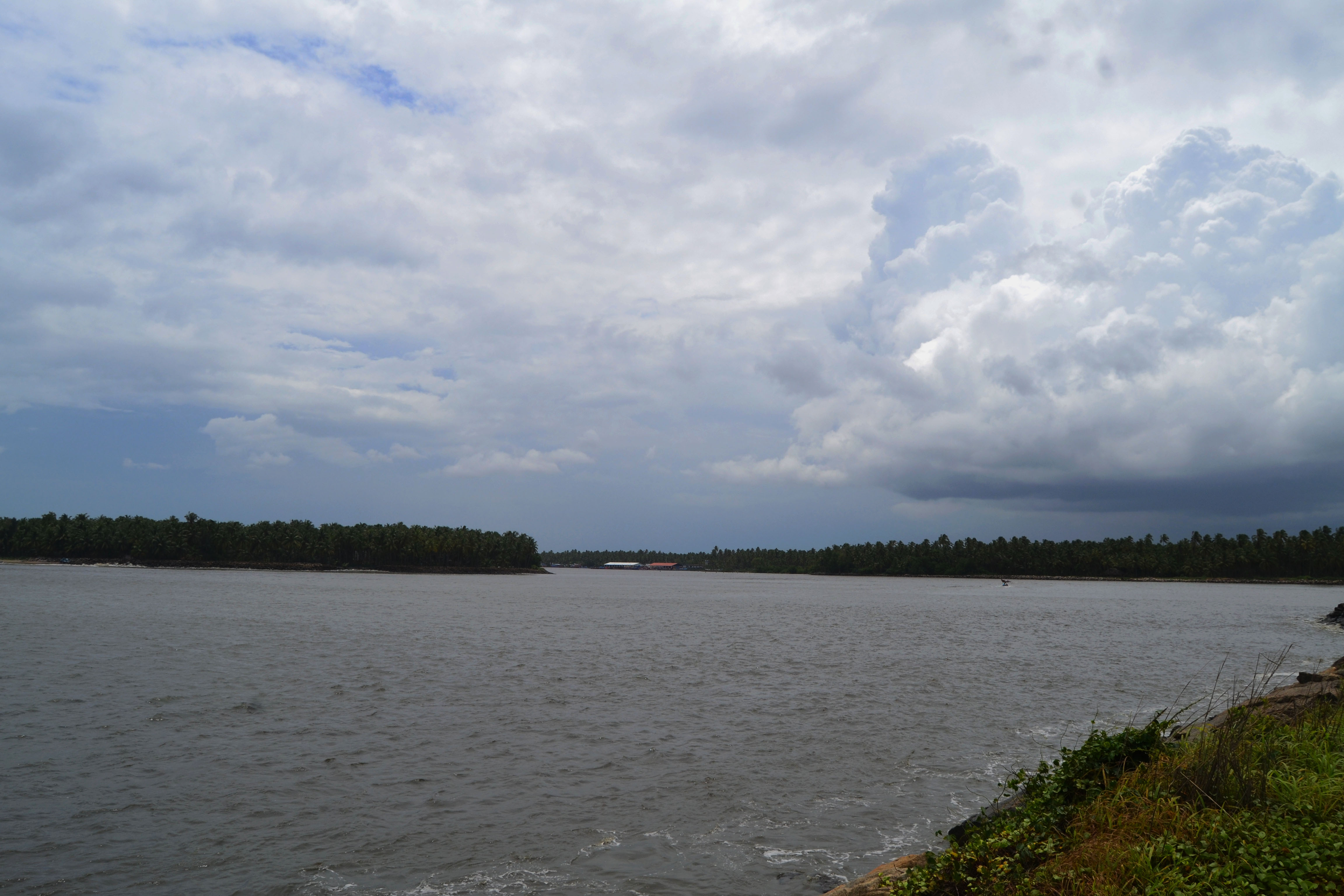
Chettuva Beach
