= Kechery River =

Location
- Country: India

Physical characteristics
- Source
  - location: Machad Mala
  - elevation: 365 m (1,198 ft)
- Mouth
  - location: Chettuva Lake
- Length: 51 km (32 mi)
- Basin size: 401 km (249 mi)

The Kechery River or Kechery Puzha is a west flowing river which has its origins at Machad hills in Thrissur District. The river is 51 kilometres in length and empties to Arabian Sea at Chettuva Lake. It is linked with backwaters at Enamaakkal. Choondal Thodu is the only tributary of this river. The river irrigates 3560 hectares of land in Thalapilly taluk on Thrissur District through Vazhani irrigation project. Parappukkavu Bhagavathy Temple is located on the banks of this river.
