= Puzhakkal River =

Coordinates: 10.5039°N 76.1084°E

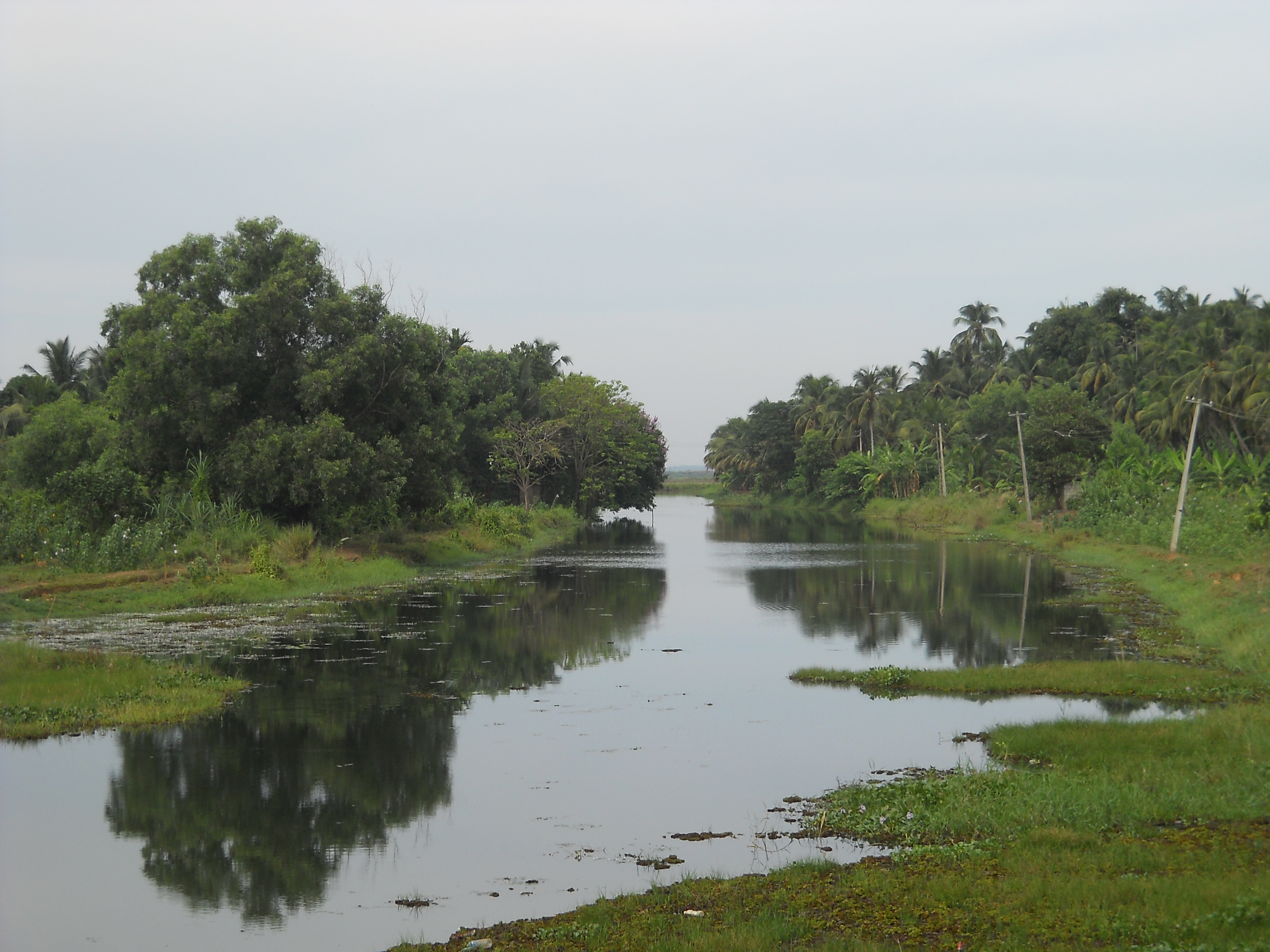
- Puzhakkal River in Thrissur City

Location
- Country: India

Physical characteristics
- Source
  - location: Killannoor Hills
  - elevation: 525 m (1,722 ft)
- Mouth
  - location: Thrissur Kole Wetlands
- Length: 29 km (18 mi)

Puzhakkal River is a westward flowing river in Thrissur District of Kerala State in India. It originates from Killannoor Hills and empties into Thrissur Kole Wetlands. The total length of the river is 29 kilometres and a total of 234 km^{2} drainage area. The main tributaries are Parathodu, Naduthodu, Poomalathadu and Kattachirathodu.
