= Thrissur-Ponnani Kole Wetlands =

Wetland in Kerala, India

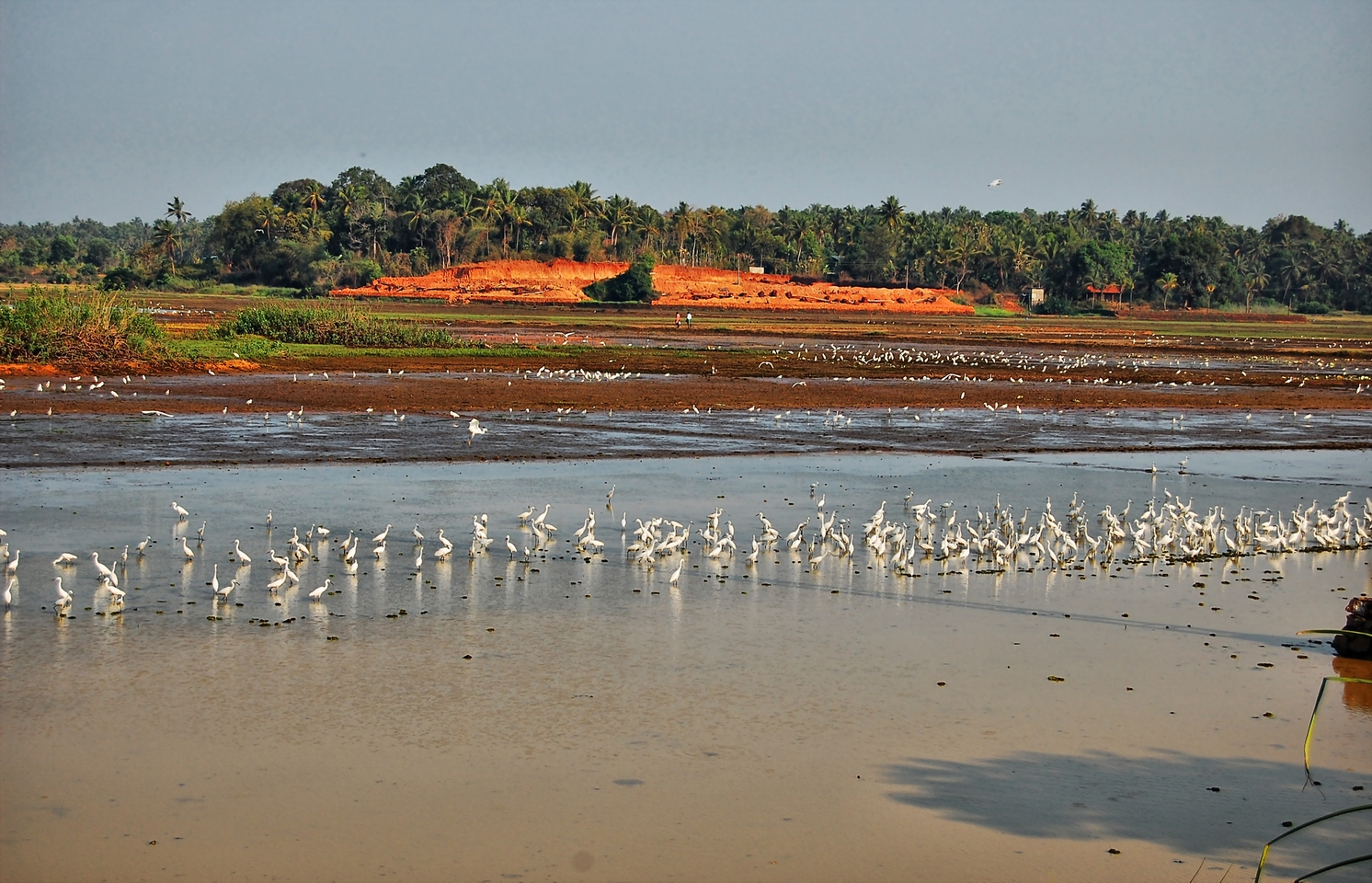
- A view of Kole Wetlands with birds. A scene from Thomana in Thrissur Metropolitan Area

- Location within Kerala
- Location: Thrissur District and Malappuram District, Kerala
- Coordinates: 10.536°N 76.176°E
- Type: Freshwater
- Primary inflows: Chalakudy River, Bharathappuzha River
- Primary outflows: none
- Basin countries: India
- Surface area: 13,640 ha (33,700 acres)
- Settlements: Thrissur, Ponnani

Thrissur-Ponnani Kole Wetlands (Malayalam: തൃശൂർ-പൊന്നാനി കോൾ പാടങ്ങൾ) is a wetland lying in Thrissur and Malappuram districts in Kerala, India. It gives 40 per cent of the Kerala’s rice requirement and acts as a natural drainage system for Ponnani town, Thrissur city, Thrissur District, and Malappuram district. The Kole Wetlands is one of largest, highly productive and threatened wetlands in Kerala and lie on the Central Asian Flyway of migratory birds.

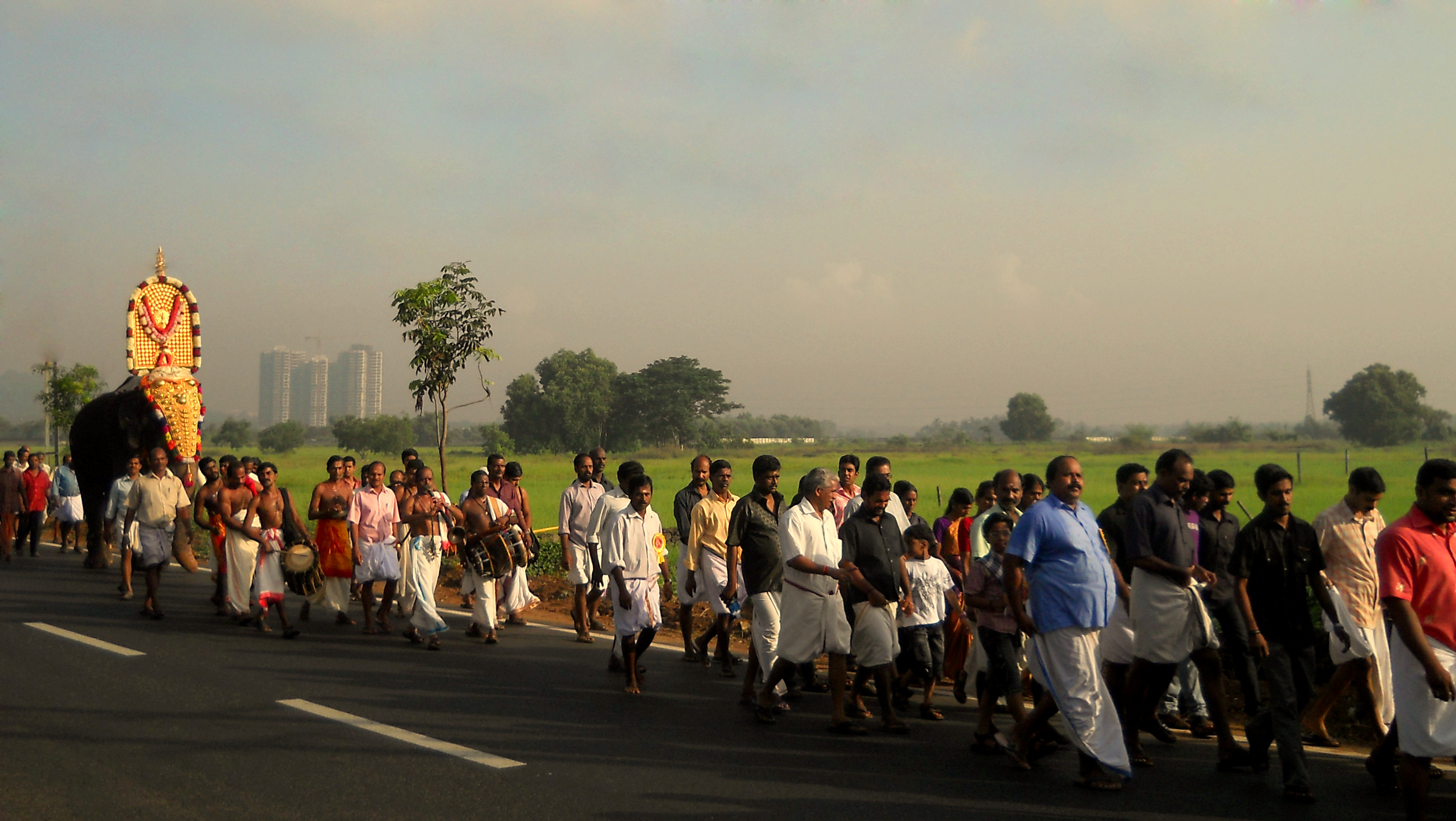
Kole Wetlands in Puzhakkal, Thrissur City

== History ==
From 18th century onwards, rice cultivation in Kole lands is said to have been started. But the Thrissur-Ponnani Kole lands recorded rice cultivation dates back to 1916 only.

== Geography ==
The word Kole is a Malayalam word meaning "a bumper yield". It is a particular cultivation method adopted in wastelands in Malappuram district and Thrissur District from December to May which are otherwise submerged from June to November, half of the year. The Kole wetlands lie between 10° 20' N and 10° 40' N latitudes, and 75° 58' E and 76° 11' E longitudes. The Kole wetlands are low lying tracts located 0.5 to 1 metre (1 ft 8 in to 3 ft 3 in) below Mean Sea Level (MSL) and remain submerged for about six months in a year. Kole lands in Thrissur are spread over eight blocks. The average annual rainfall is 3,200 millimetres (130 in) and temperature varies from 28 to 31.5 °C (82.4 to 88.7 °F).

The Kole Wetlands cover an area of about 13,632 hectares (33,690 acres) spread over Thrissur district and Malappuram district. The area extends from Chalakudy River in South to Bharathappuzha River in the North, and to Ponnani Taluk. The Kole Wetlands acts as natural drainage system for Thrissur city and Thrissur district through a network of canals and ponds which connects different parts of Kole Wastelands to Enamavu river, one of the smallest River in Kerala, Canoli Canal, Chettuva River and then to the Arabian Sea. It is fertile with alluvium soil which is deposited Kechery and Karuvannoor river in the monsoon.

== Fauna ==
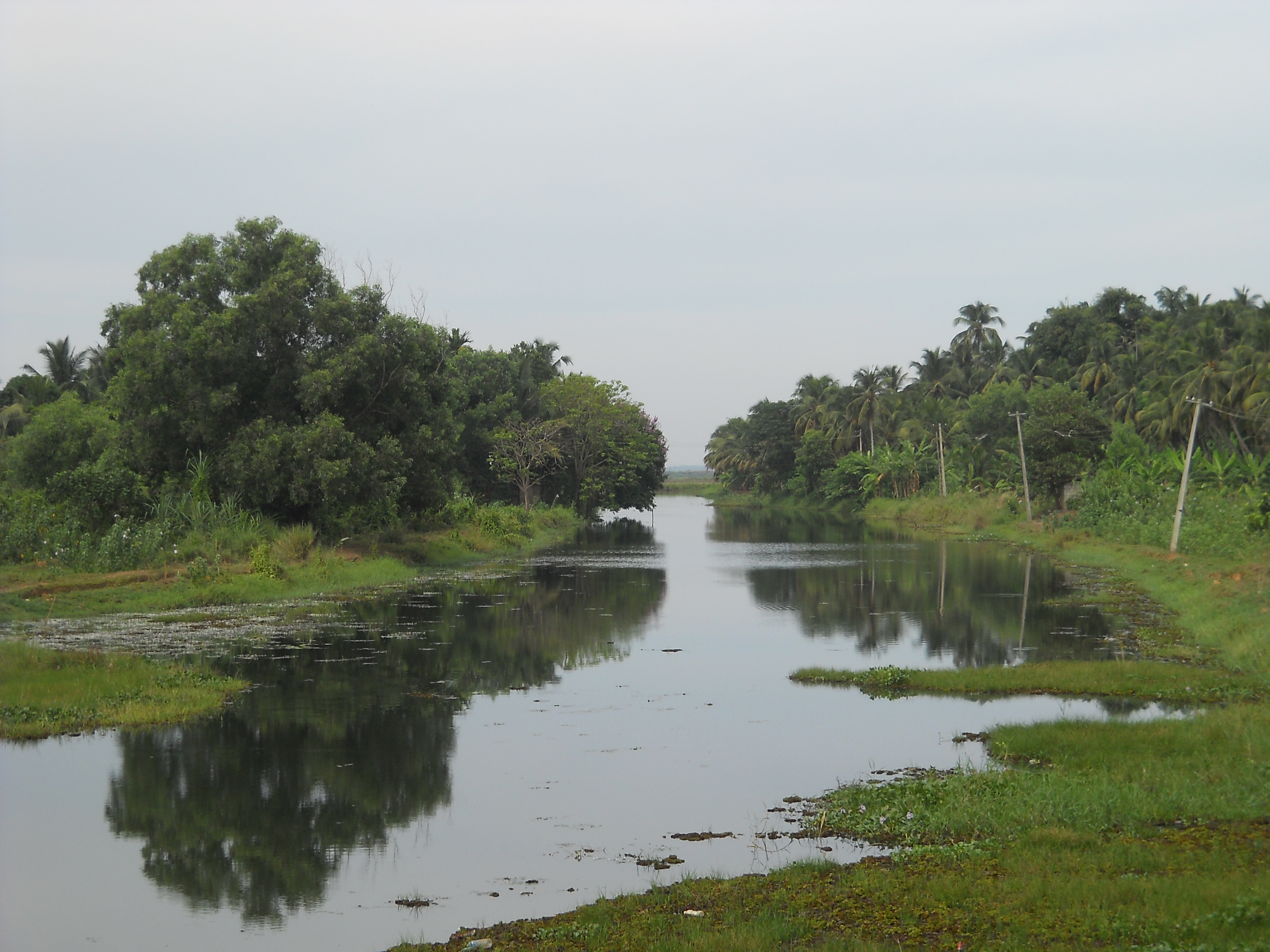
Puzhakkal River, one of the rivers which go through the Kole Wetlands and provide water for rice cultivation

In terms of the number of birds, the Thrissur Kole Wetlands is the third largest in India after Chilika Lake in Orissa and Amipur Tank in Gujarat. It has been recognised as one of India's Important Bird Areas by BirdLife International. According to studies, there are 241 species of birds like spot-billed pelican, darter, Oriental darter, black-headed ibis, painted stork, black-bellied tern, cinereous vulture and greater spotted eagle. Fishes like Caranx, Cyprinidae, mangrove red snapper, Megalops cyprinoides and barramundi are also found in Kole Wetland.

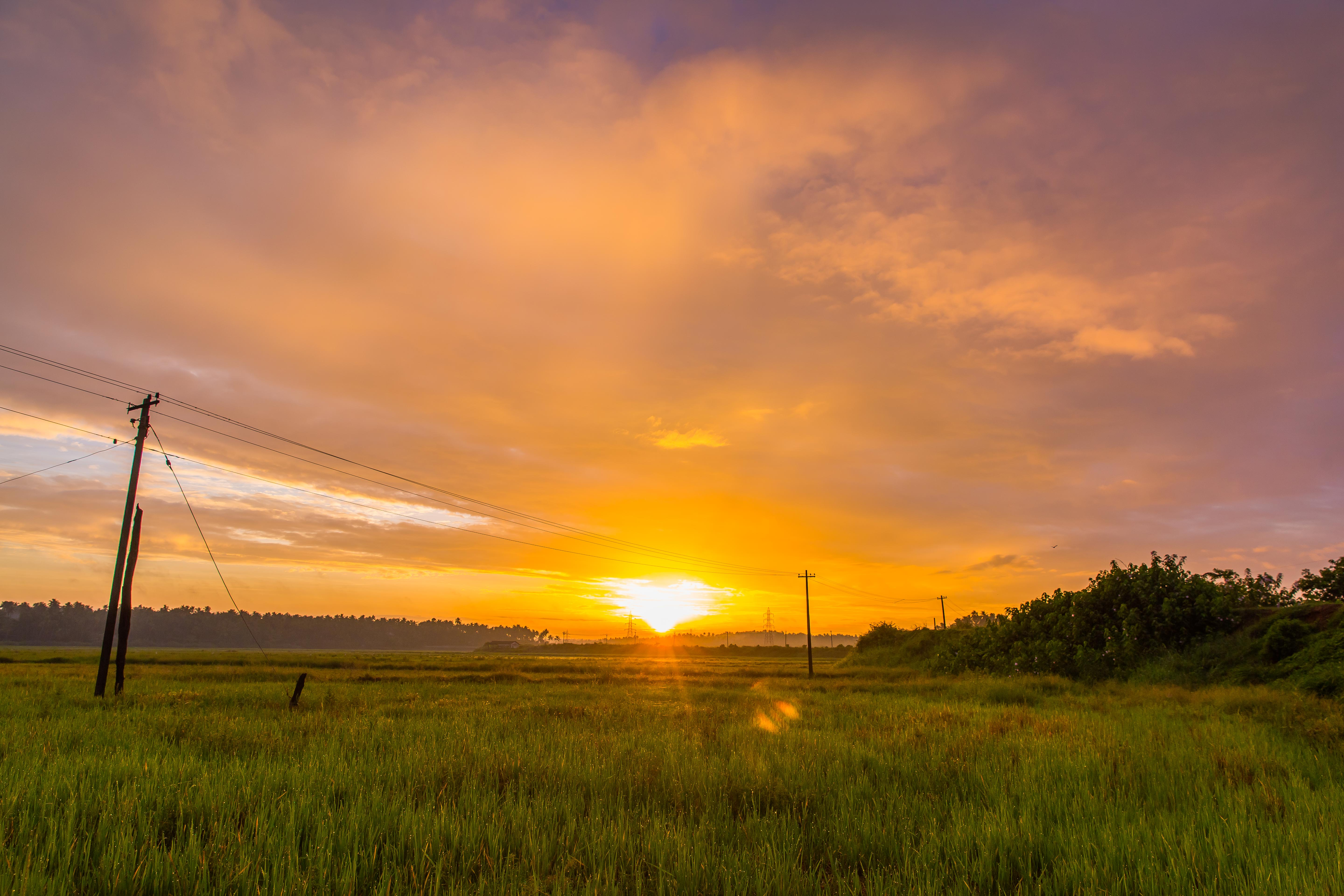
Sunrise over the Pullu Padam with a Morning drizzle

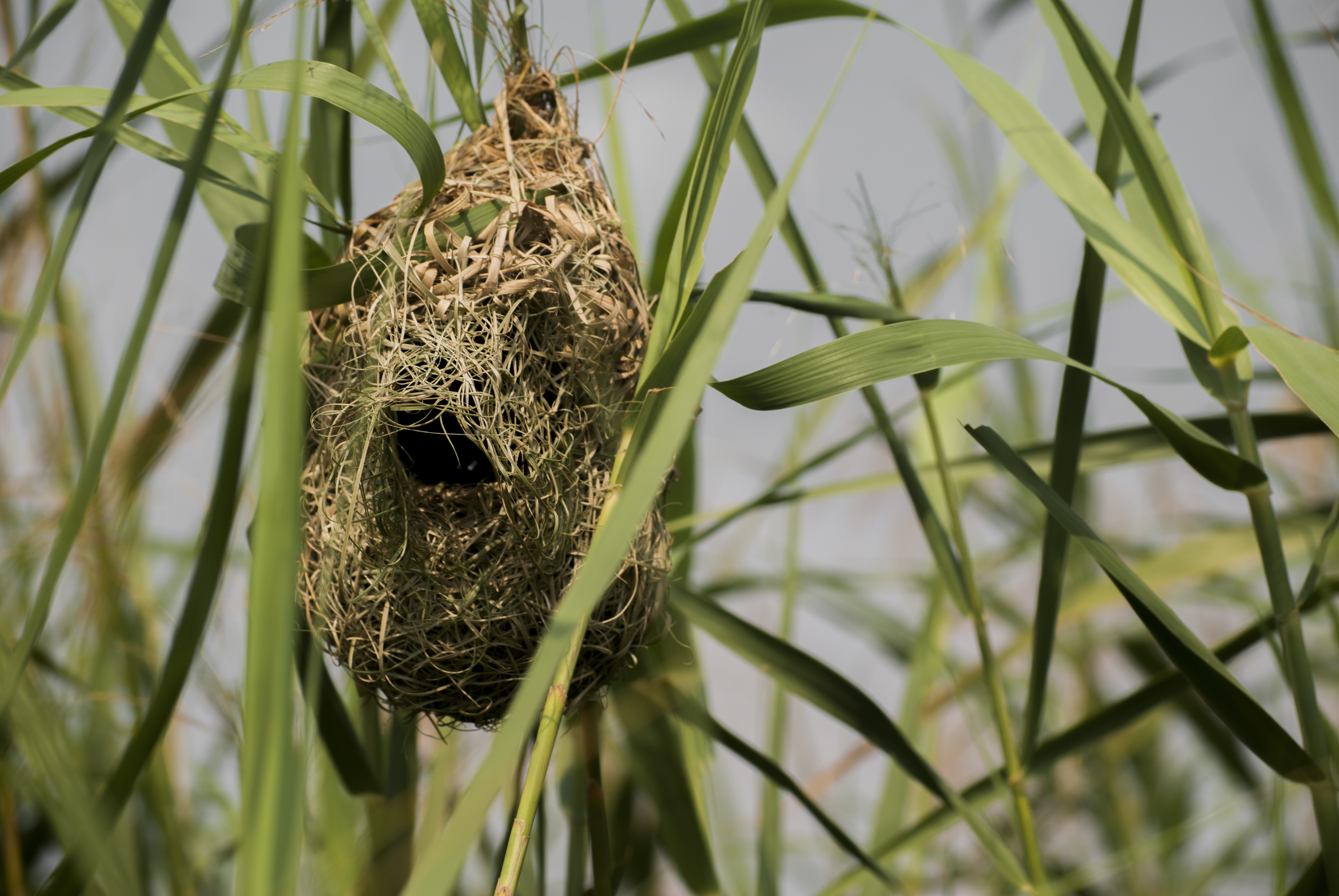
Bird's Nest Thrissur Kole Wetlands

== Threat ==
The main threat to Kole Wetlands is expansion of cities and towns like city of Thrissur. The boom in construction industry, especially the real estate business in Central Kerala, has rung the alarm bell for the Kole wetlands. Coconut cultivation, construction of buildings and houses, conversion of fields for sand and clay mining and brick kilns, hunting of wetland birds are the main threats for the Kole wetlands. Fresh water shortage and quality of water due to water intrusion from the Canoly Canal has been reported from various parts of Kole wetlands in Thrissur district.The use of agrochemicals during the cultivation period is enhance the concentration of xenobiotics in the water and sediment of the Kol ecosystem (Nisari and Sujatha, 2021)

== Kole Development Agency ==
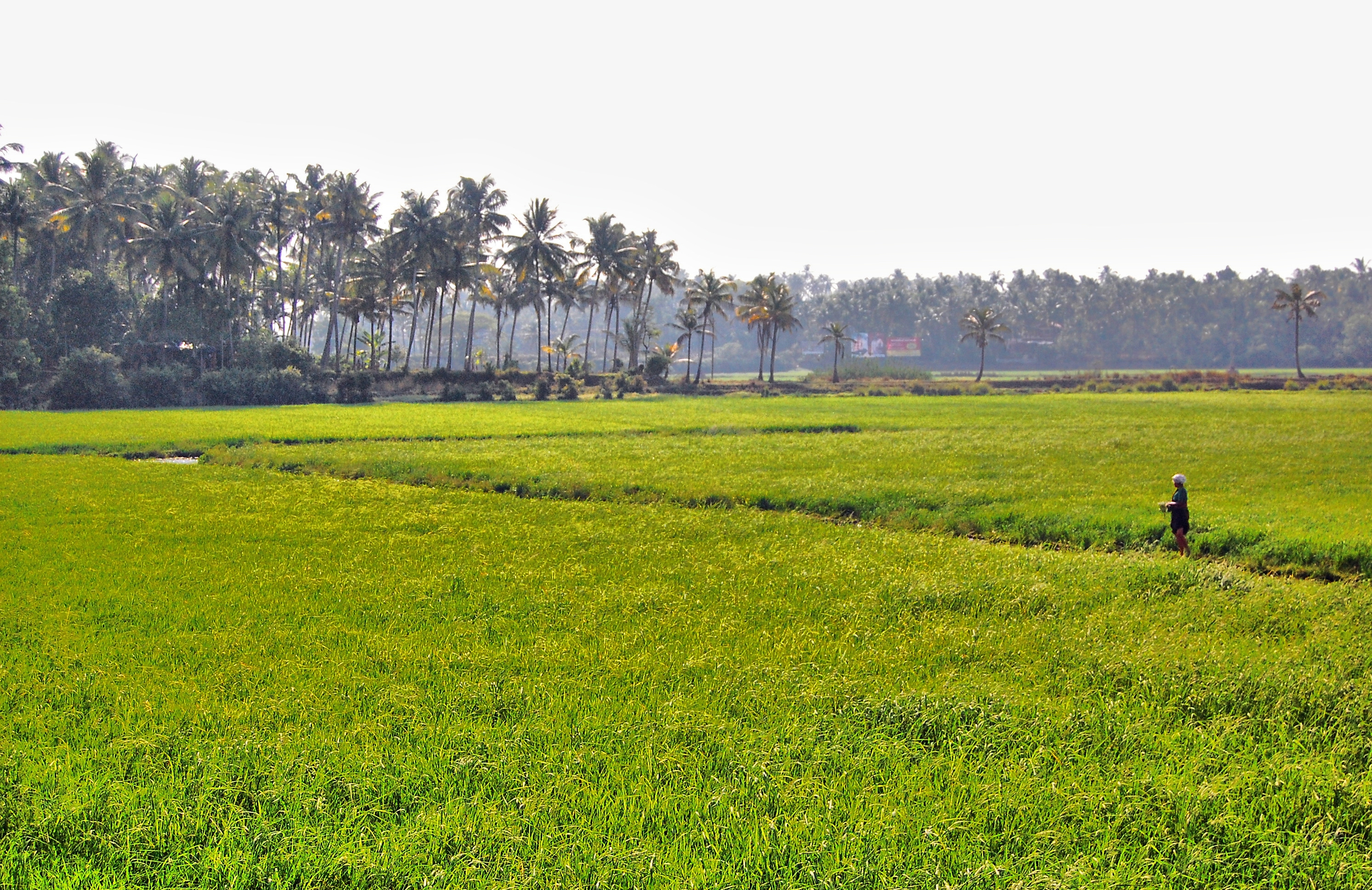
Rice cultivation in Kole Wastelands in Thrissur Metropolitan Area

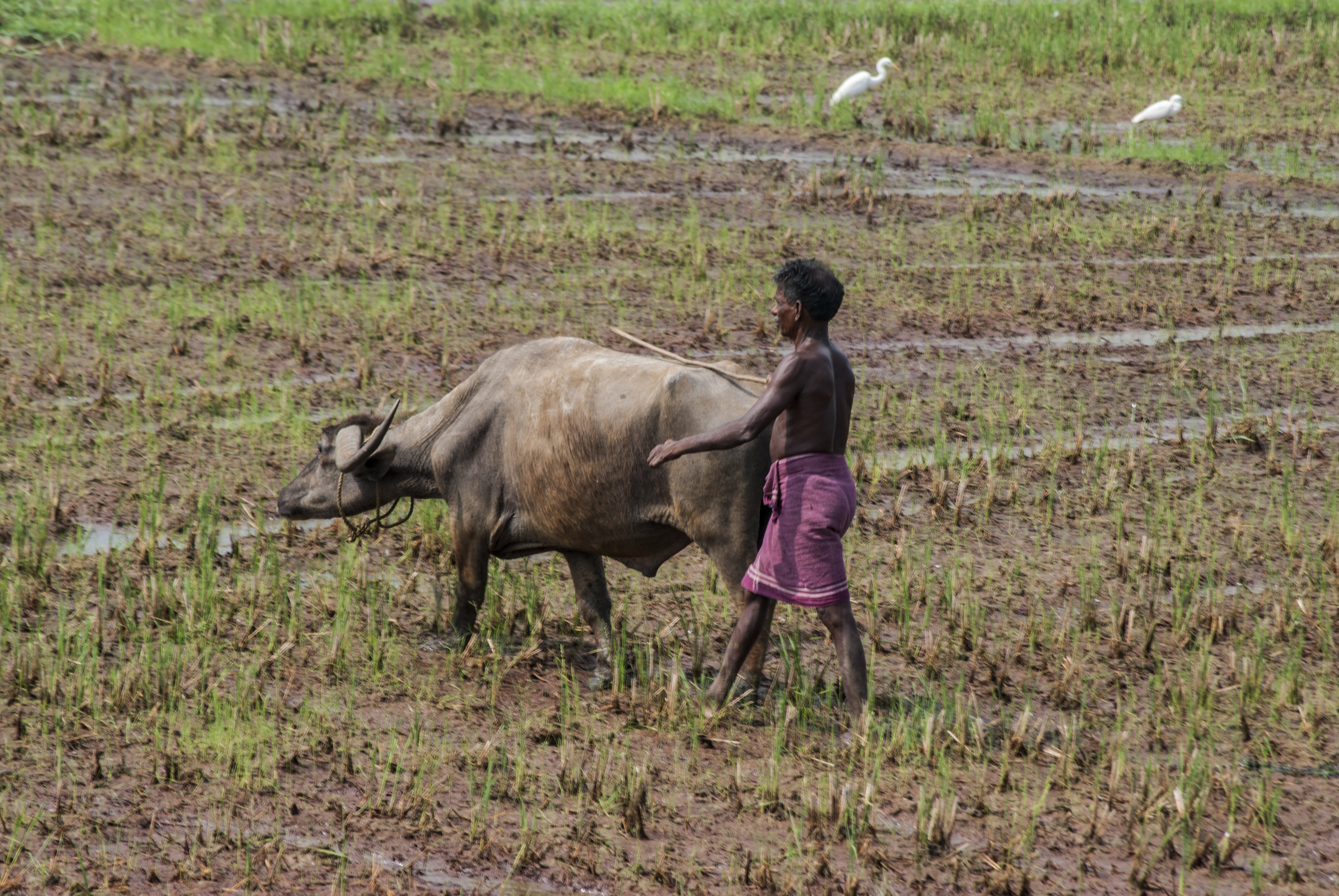
Farming Thrissur Kole Wetlands

The Government of India has approved Rs 425-crore project for the comprehensive development of Thrissur Kole fields. The fund will be used for infrastructure development, construction of bunds, canals, roads, farm mechanisation in Kole fields. At the Rs 15 crore a research centre would be set up to study the Kole land development. The Government of Kerala has formed a Special Purpose Vehicle for the implementation of the Kole development project and the District Collector of Thrissur is designated as special officer to coordinate implementation of the package. For the implementation of the project, Government of Kerala has opened an agency known as Kole Development Agency (KDA) in Thrissur City on June 30 for the development of Kole farming. Thrissur District Collector is the special officer to implement the project.

== Kole Birders Collective ==
Inspired by the rich biodiversity, ecological significance and agricultural potential of the Kole Wetlands a group of individuals with a shared vision came together to form the Kole Birders Collective.

As a tribute to the essence of the Kole wetlands, the collective has been conducting yearly photo exhibitions titled “Kaanapadavukal” from 2024.

“Kaanapadavukal 2.0” was held at the Thrissur Lalithakala Academy Art Gallery from April 30 to May 7, 2025.

Featuring over 200 photographs captured by more than 100 photographers from the Kole wetlands, the exhibition was a celebration of the efforts of the Kole Birders Collective supported by wetland lovers.

== Gallery ==
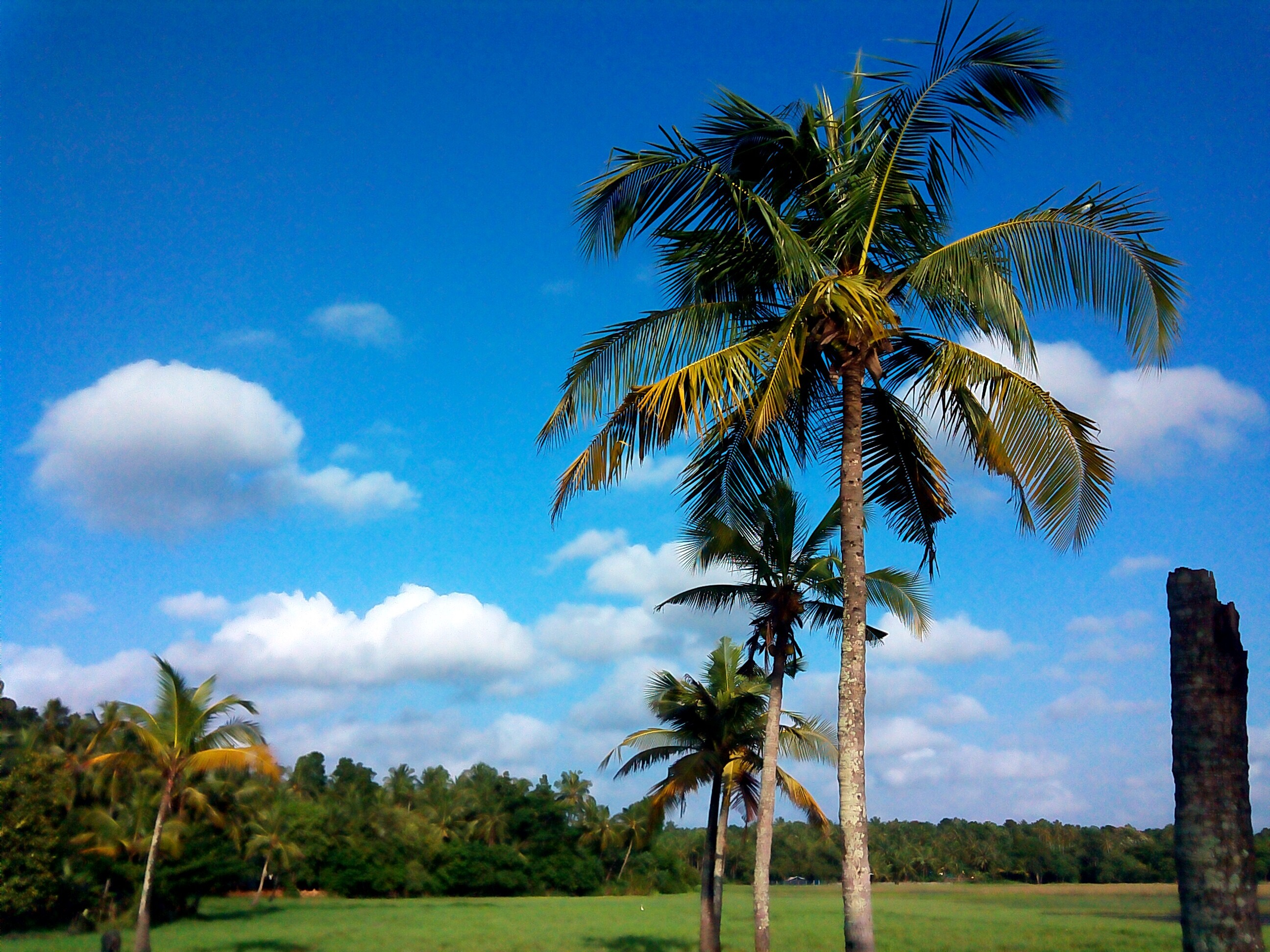
A view of paddy field from Edappal, Ponnani taluk, Malappuram district

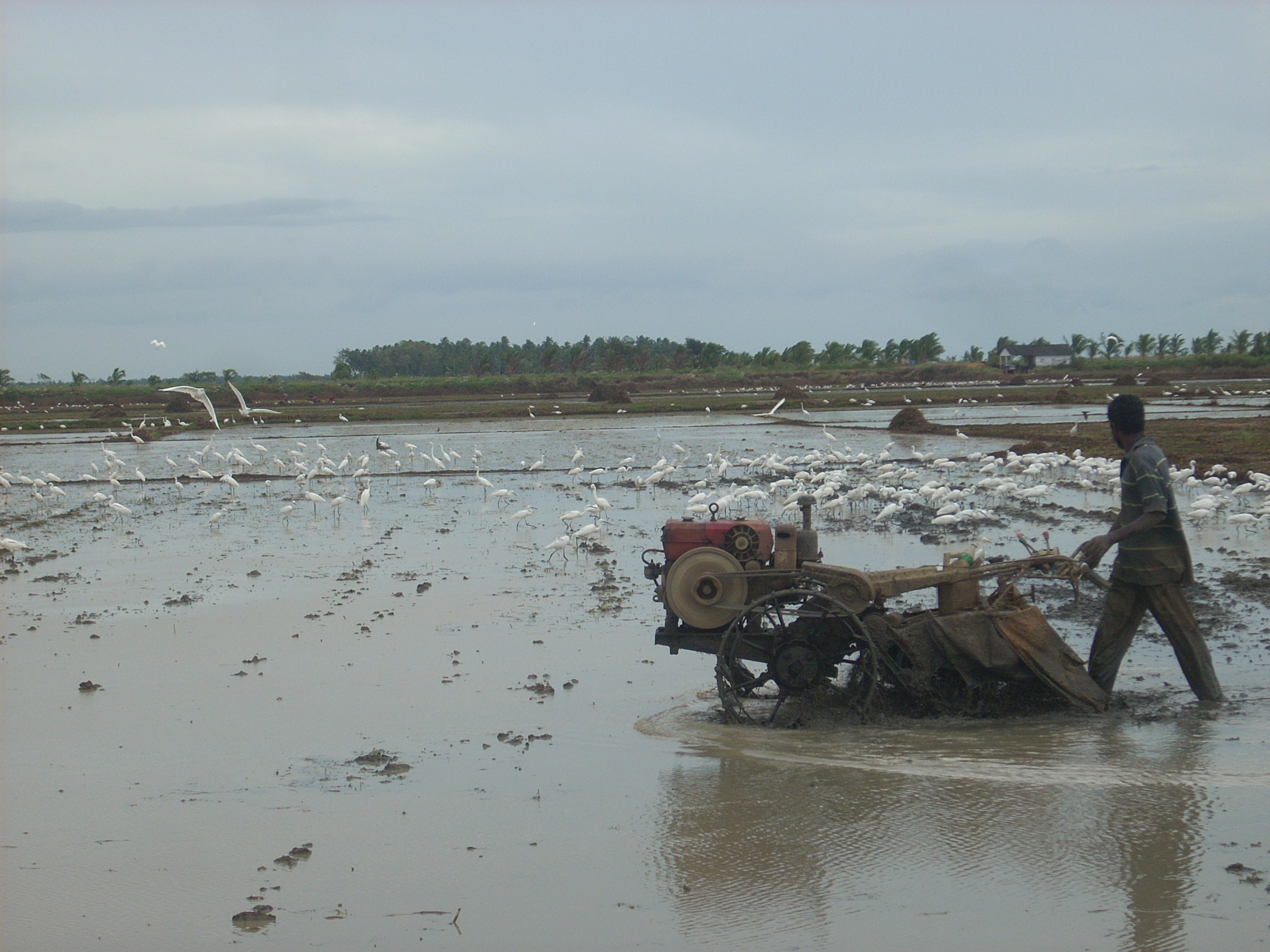
A view of paddy field from Thrissur district

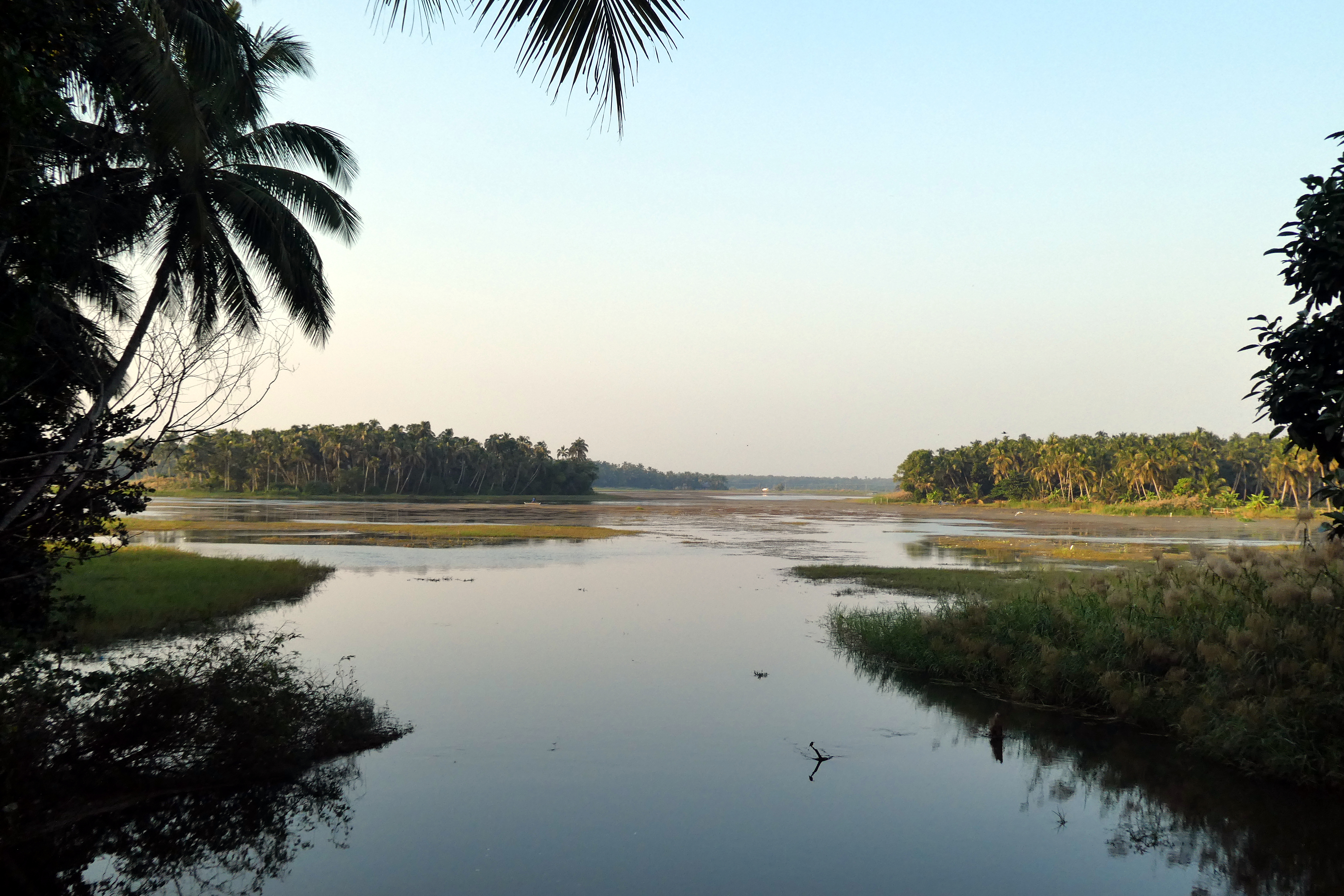
A view from Athani, Malappuram district

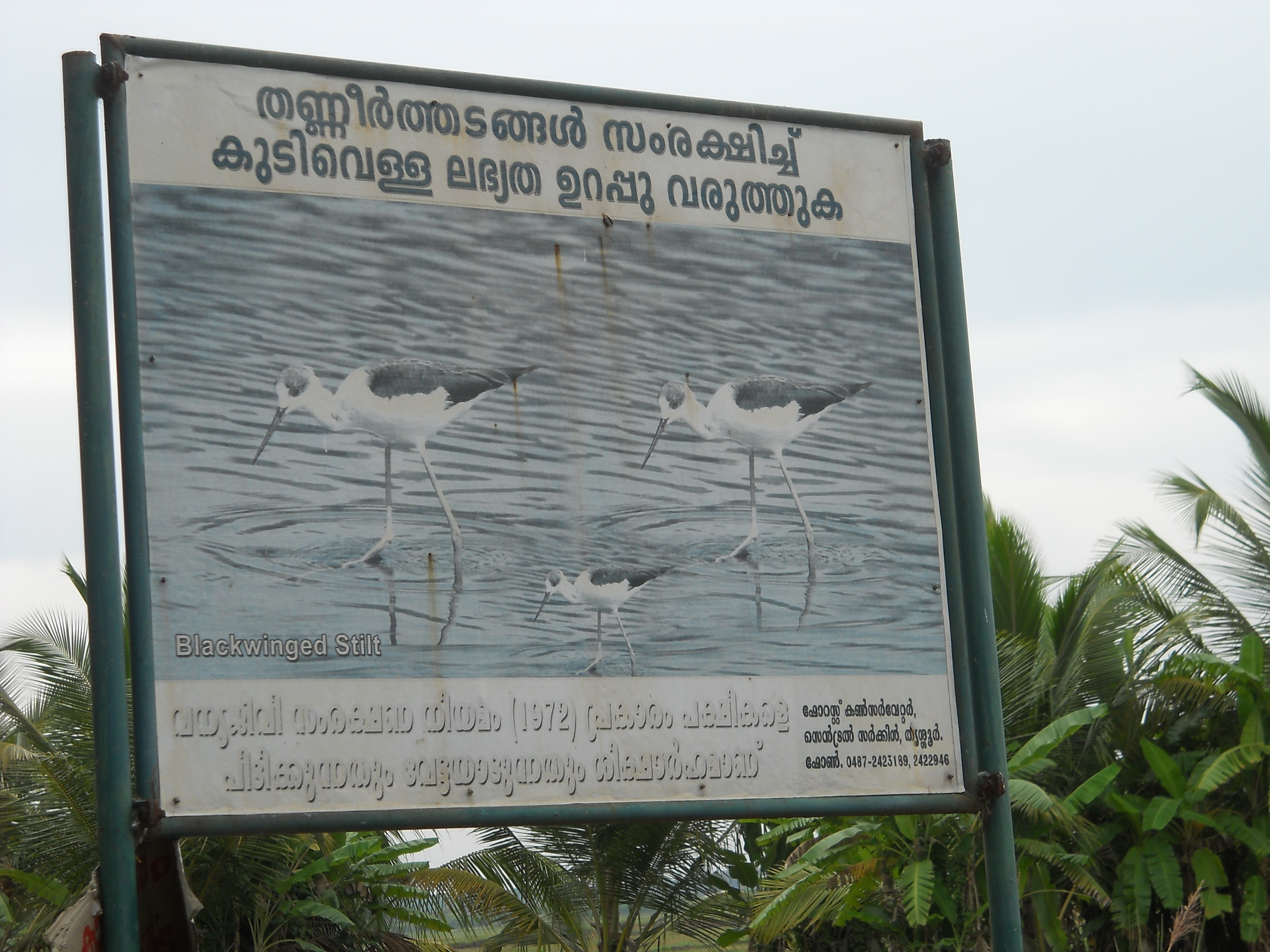
A board which announces the citizen to protect the birds. A view from Thrissur district

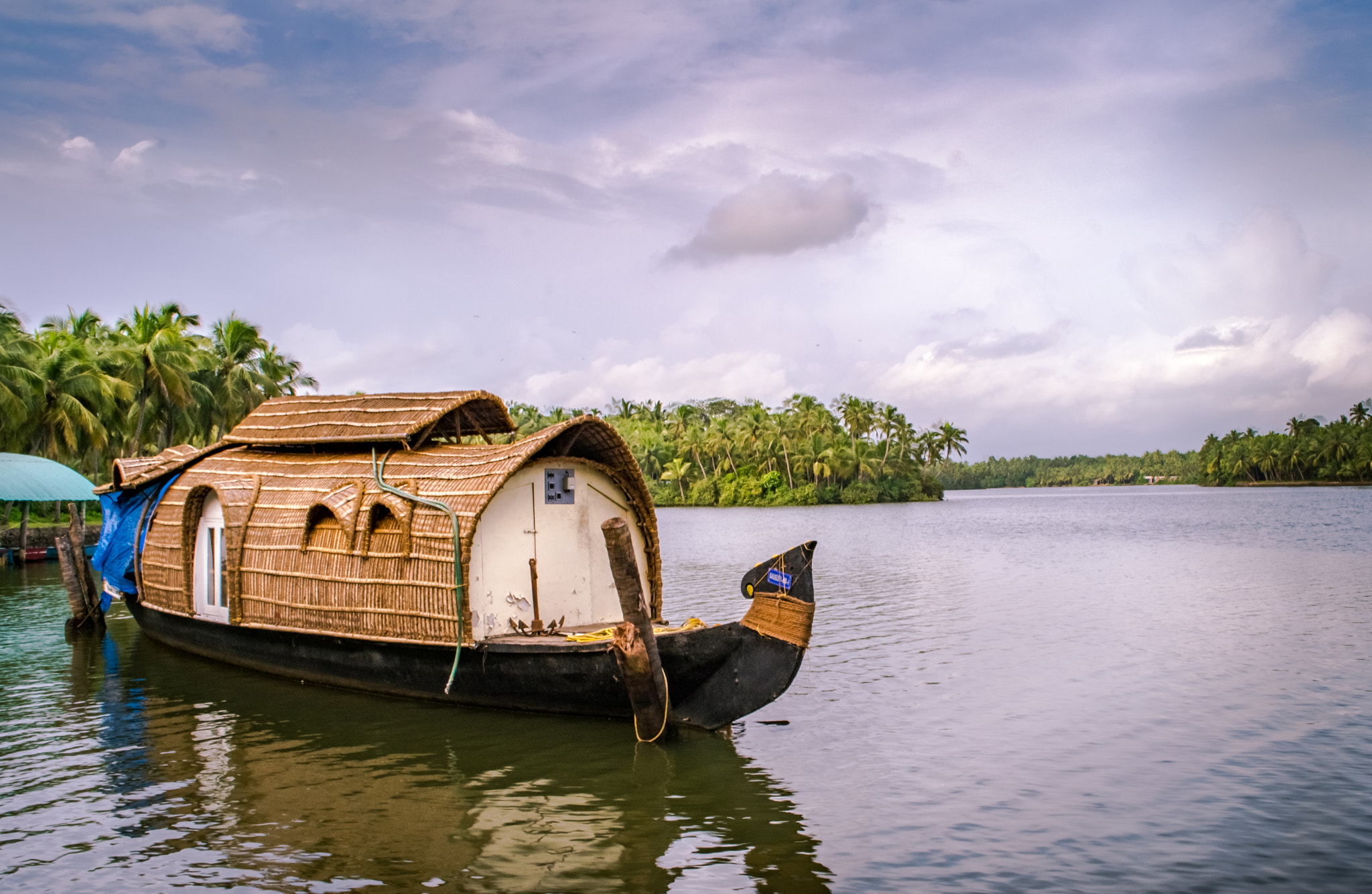
The Biyyam backwater of Ponnani, Malappuram district, is located on the bank of Kole Wetlands.

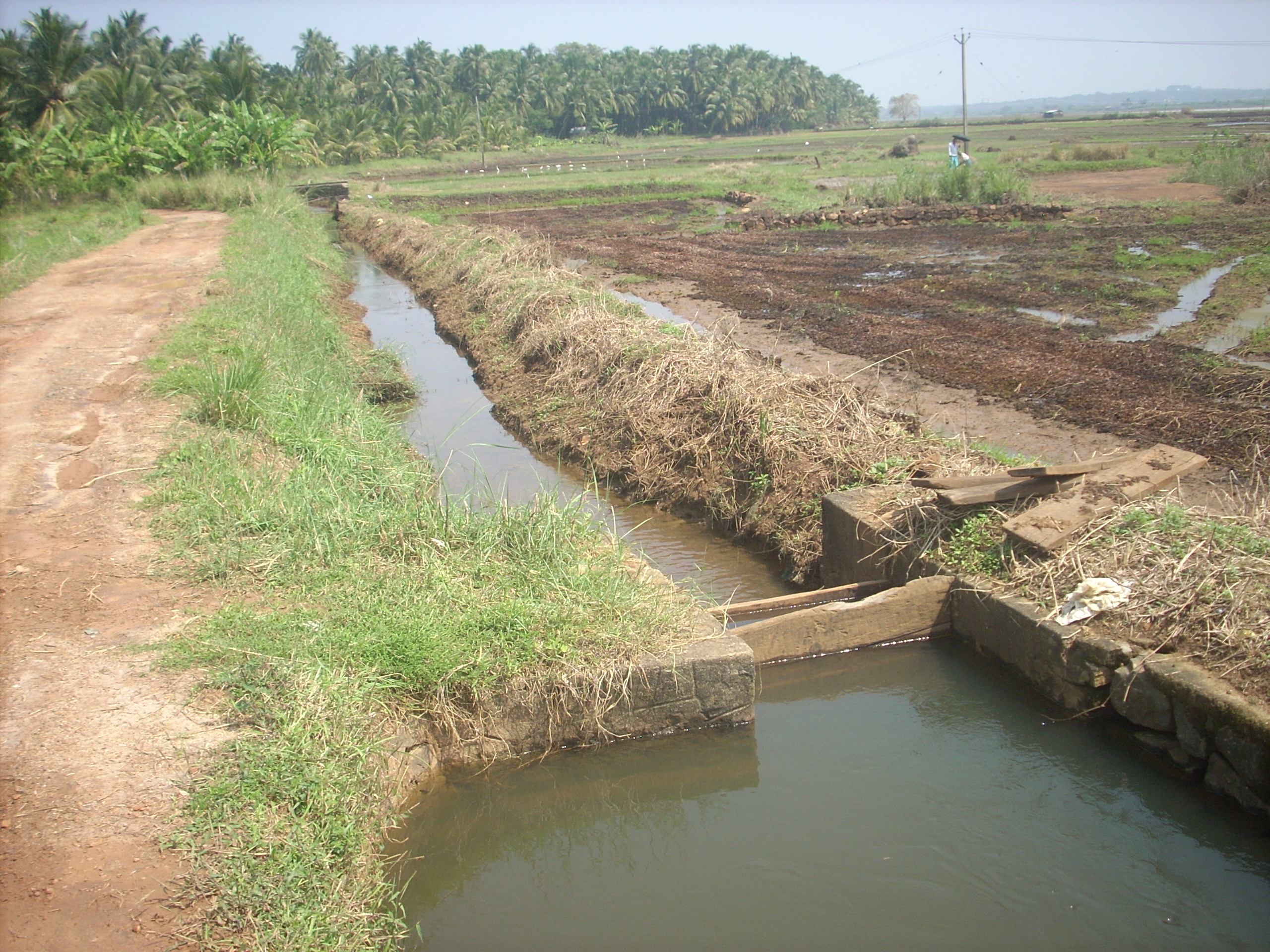
A view of paddy field from Thrissur district

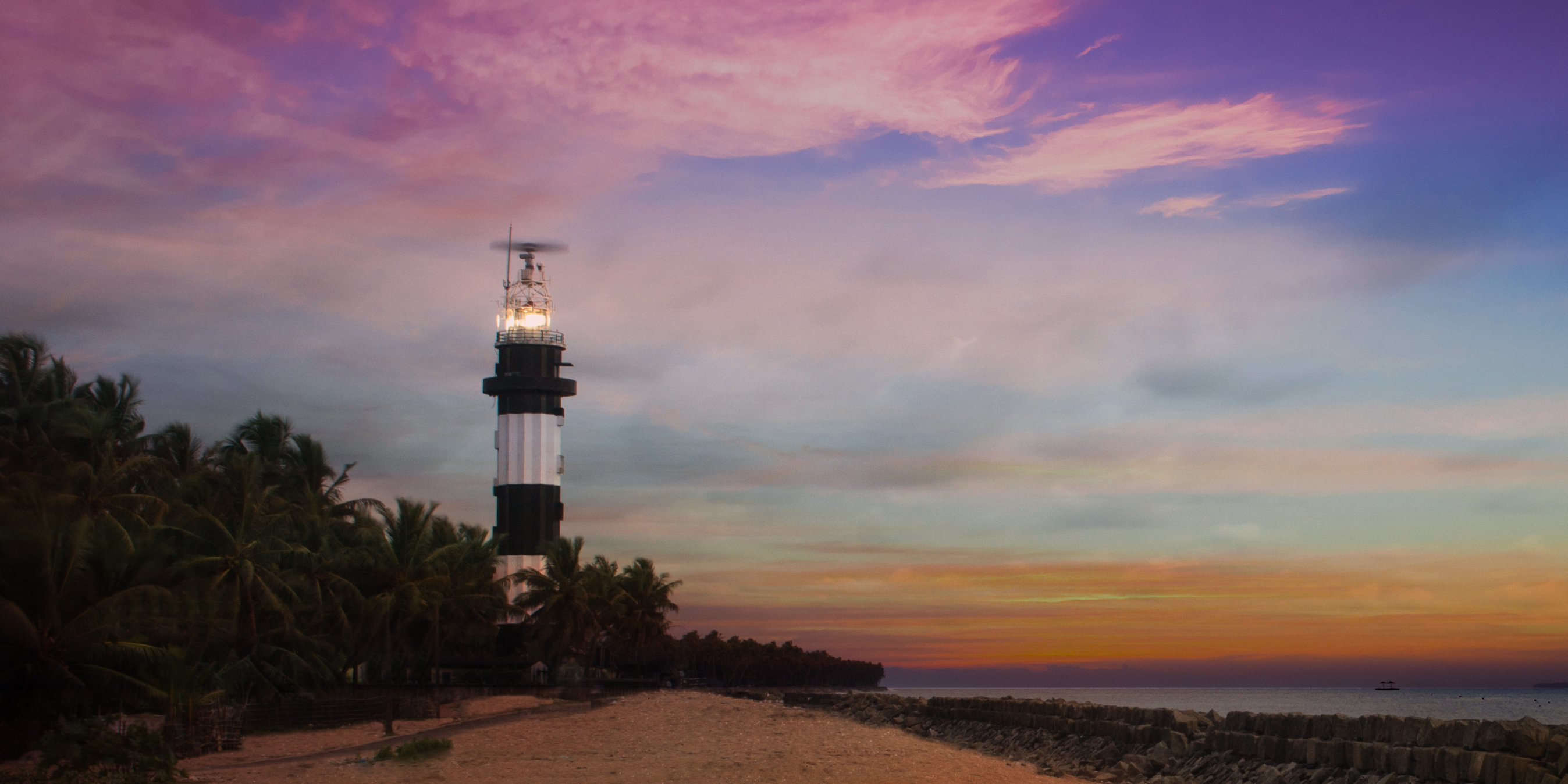
Bharathappuzha, the second-longest river of Kerala, merges with Arabian Sea at Ponnani port, near the Kole Wetlands.

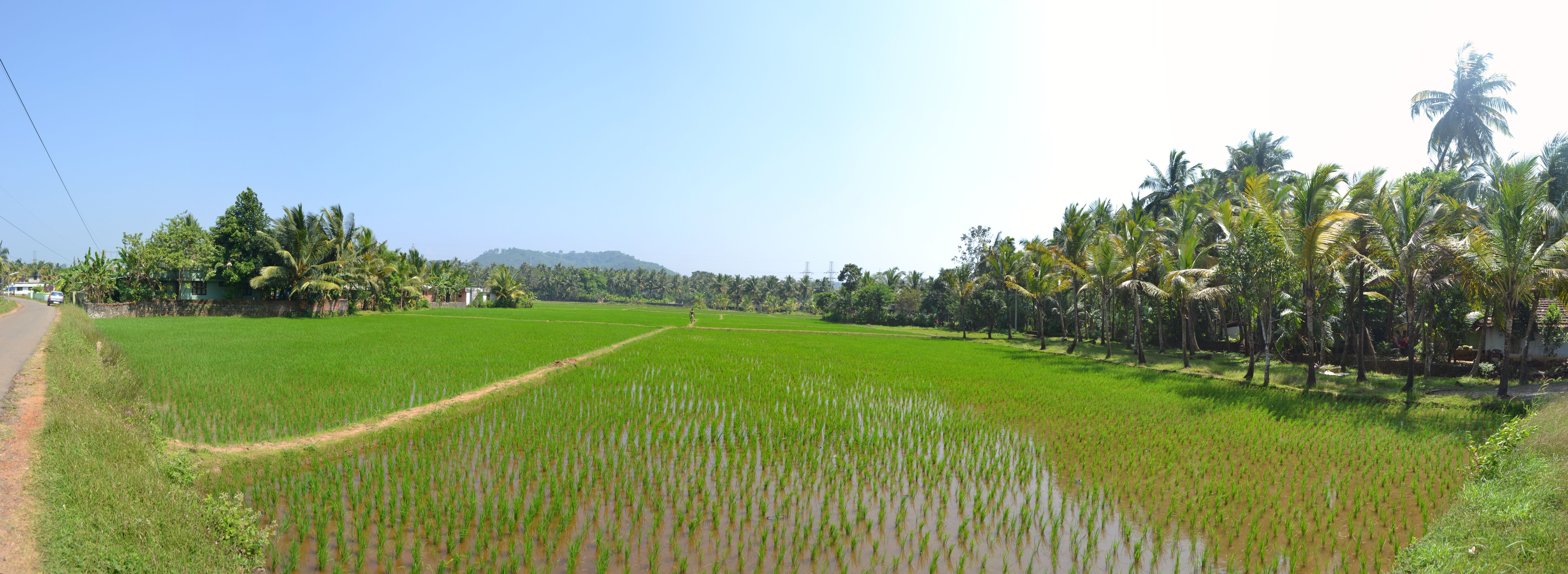
A view of paddy field from Thrissur district

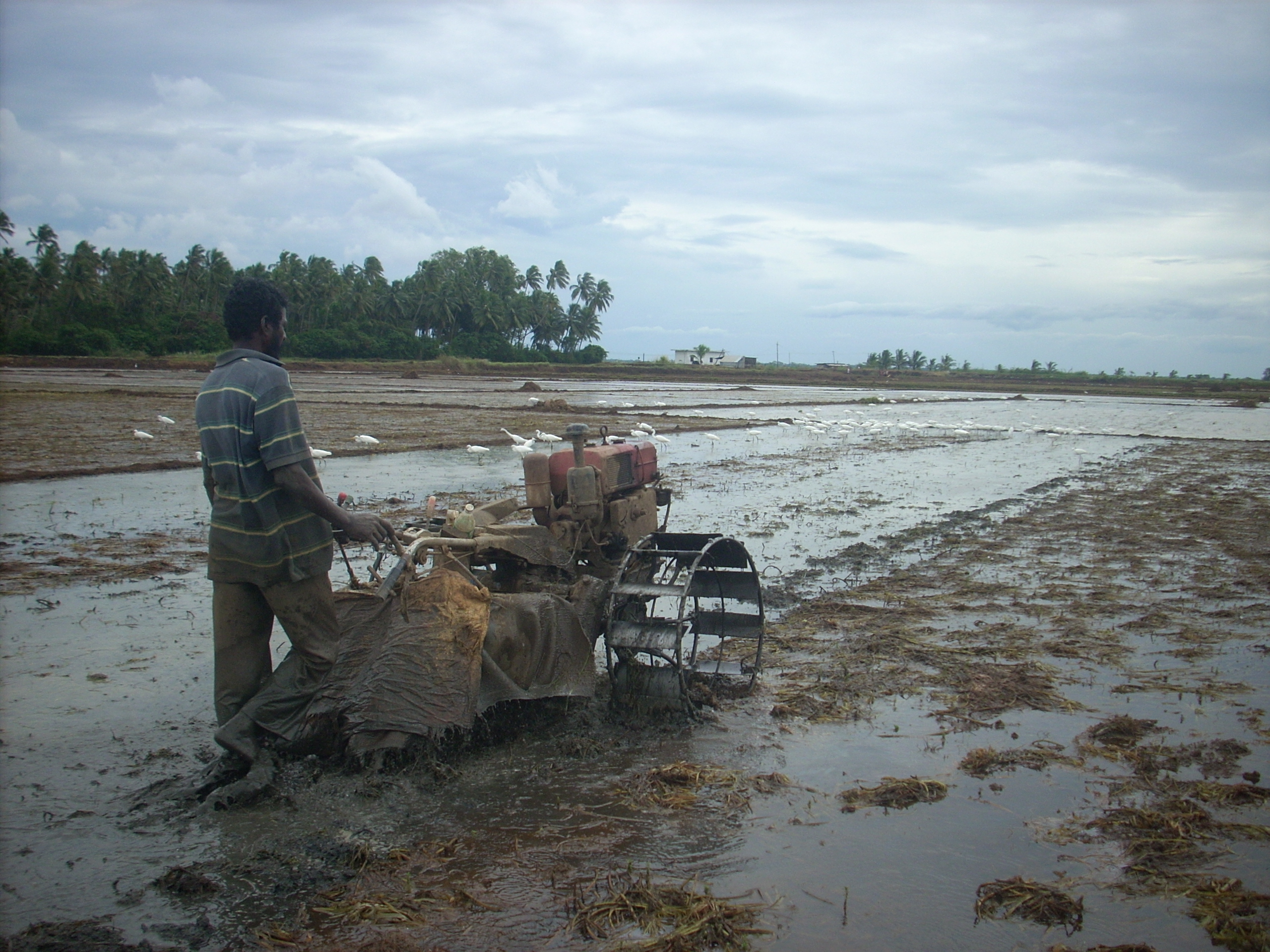
A view of paddy field from Thrissur district

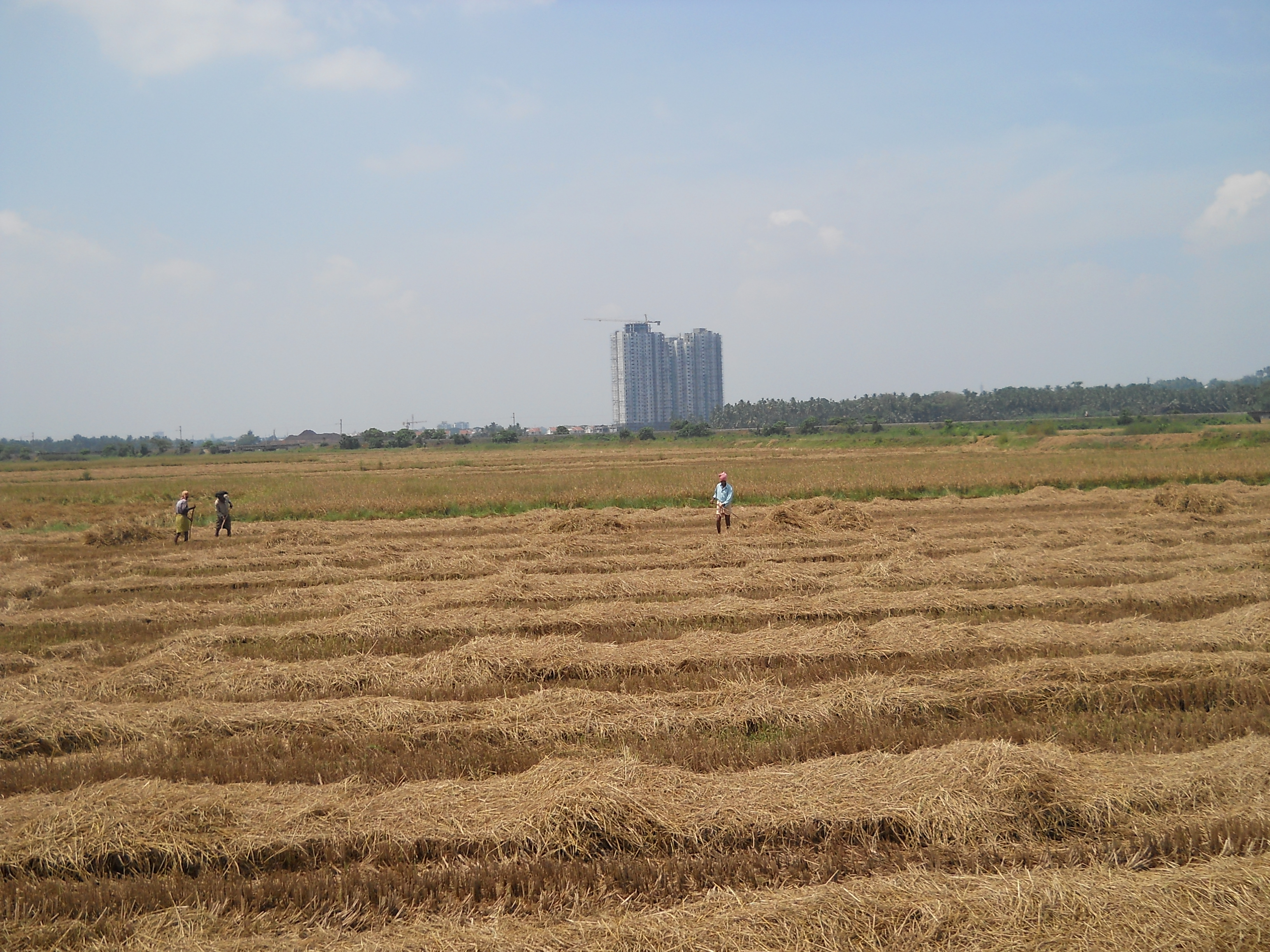
A view of paddy field from Thrissur district
