= William Fort =

1714 fort in Kerala, India

Coordinates: 10.525°N 76.0422°E

- Chettuva, Thrissur District, Kerala
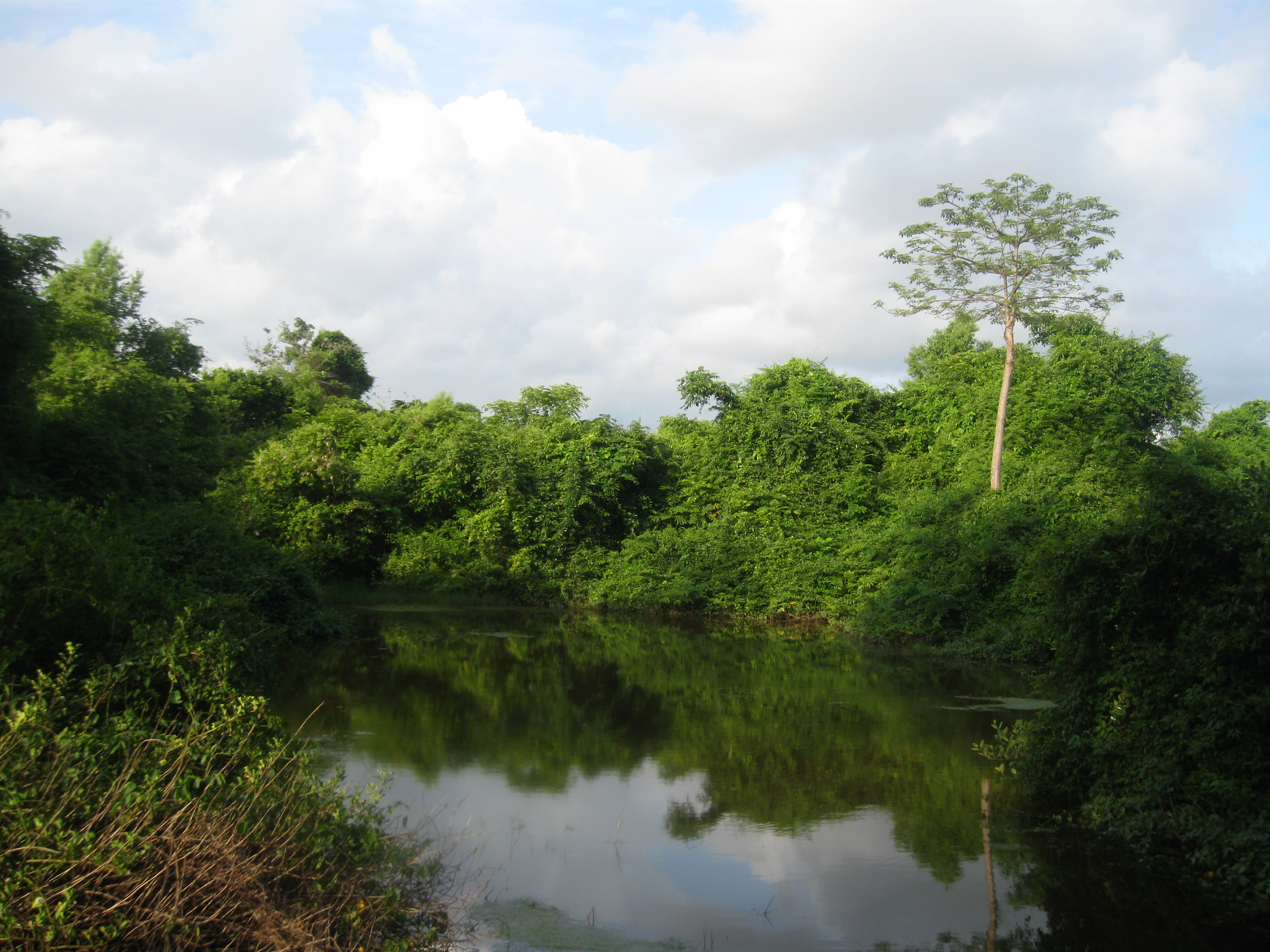
- Ruins of the William Fort

Site information
- Type: Cultural
- Owner: Government of Kerala
- Controlled by: Portugal; Dutch East India Company; British East India Company; Zamorin of Calicut; Kingdom of Mysore
- Open to the public: Yes
- Condition: Structure

Site history
- Built: 1714
- Materials: Stone
- Demolished: Partly

William Fort or locally known as Chettuva Fort is located in Chettuva, Thrissur District of Kerala, India.

== History ==
The fort was constructed by the Dutch East India Company with the permission from Kingdom of Cochin in 1714. Fort was later occupied by Zamorin of Calicut and thereafter Tipu Sultan. Tipu Sultan defeated Zamorin of Calicut and renamed it as Tipu Sultan Fort. The fort was captured and recaptured many times by British Empire, Dutch East India Company, Kingdom of Mysore, Zamorin of Calicut and Kingdom of Cochin. Lastly, the fort was captured by Tipu Sultan and demolished partially. The fort is now dilapidated and conservation drive was started in 2010 by the State Archeological Department.
