= Enamakkal Lake =

Lake in India

- Location within Kerala Location within India
- Location: Thrissur District, Kerala
- Coordinates: 10°30′14″N 76°06′28″E
- Basin countries: India
- Surface area: 25 km^{2} (9.7 sq mi)
- Settlements: Thrissur

Enamakkal Lake is a fresh water lake situated in Enamakkal of Thrissur District in Kerala State, India. The lake covers about 25 square kilometres.

== History ==
On western side of the lake, it is protected by a bund which was the brain child of Sakthan Thampuran. In his letter to the Collector of Malabar in 1802, he proposed a bund to control the salt water. The Keecheri River and Viyyoor River joins Enamakkal Lake.

In 2018 December 9, a steel bridge was inaugurated across the Enamakal lake connecting Manalur and Enamakal.
