= Puthukkad Assembly constituency =

Constituency of the Kerala legislative assembly in India

Puthukkad
- Constituency No. 71 for the Kerala Legislative Assembly
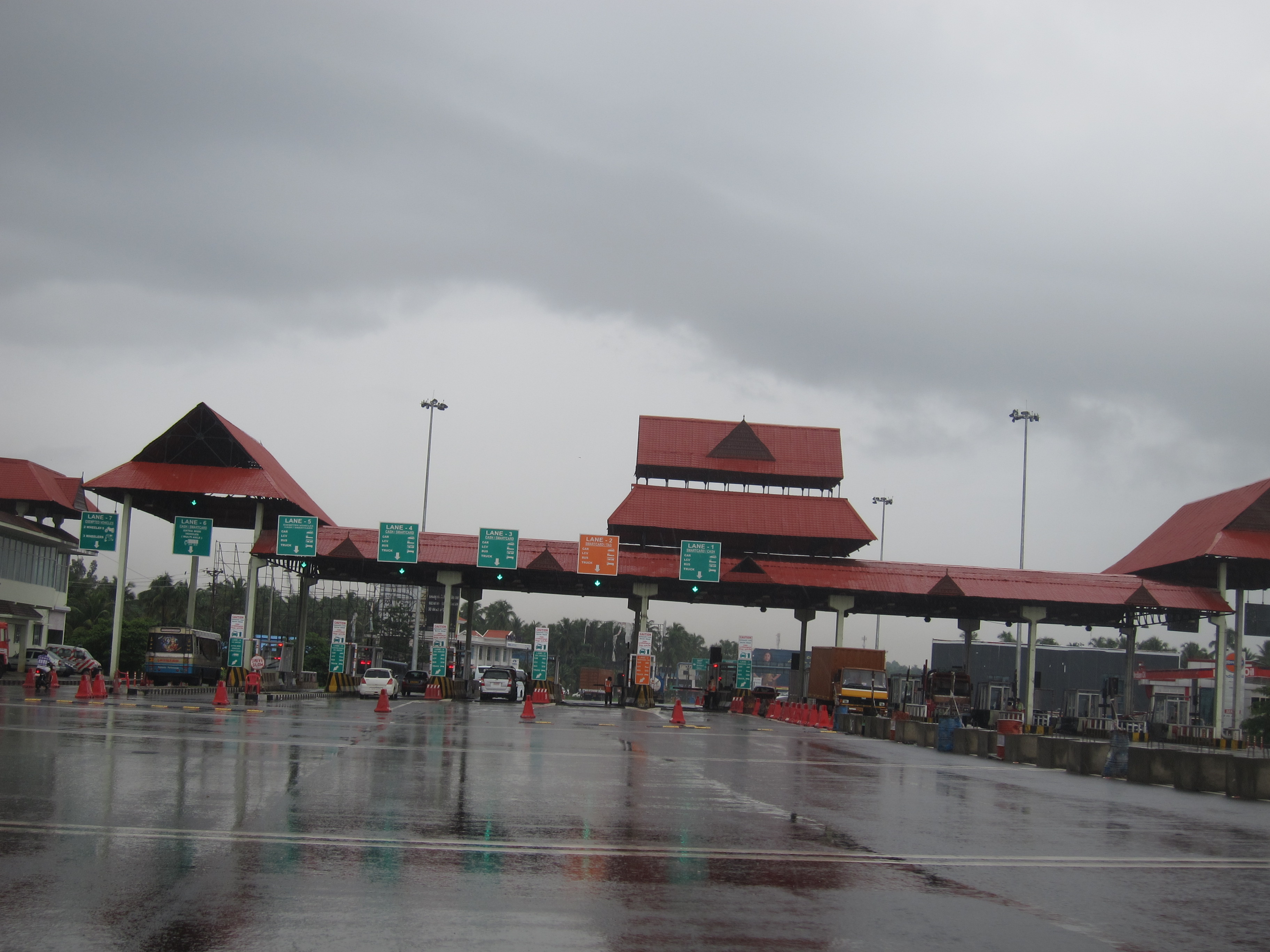
- Paliyekkara Toll Plaza in Chittissery

Constituency details
- Country: India
- Region: South India
- State: Kerala
- District: Thrissur
- Lok Sabha constituency: Thrissur
- Established: 2008
- Total electors: 1,95,265 (2016)
- Reservation: None

Member of Legislative Assembly
- 16th Kerala Legislative Assembly
- Incumbent K. K. Ramachandran
- Party: CPI(M)
- Alliance: LDF
- Elected year: 2026

Puthukkad is one of the 140 state legislative assembly constituencies in Kerala. It is also one of the seven state legislative assembly constituencies included in Thrissur Lok Sabha constituency. As of the 2026 Assembly elections, the current MLA is K. K. Ramachandran of CPI(M).

== Local self-governed segments ==
Puthukkad Assembly constituency is composed of the following local self-governed segments:

Sl no.	Name	Status (Grama panchayat/Municipality)	Taluk
1	Alagappa Nagar	Grama panchayat	Mukundapuram
2	Nenmanikkara	Grama panchayat	Mukundapuram
3	Parappukkara	Grama panchayat	Mukundapuram
4	Puthukkad	Grama panchayat	Mukundapuram
5	Trikkur	Grama panchayat	Mukundapuram
6	Mattathur	Grama panchayat	Chalakudy
7	Varandarappilly	Grama panchayat	Chalakudy
8	Vallachira	Grama panchayat	Thrissur

== Members of Legislative Assembly ==
The following list contains all members of Kerala Legislative Assembly who have represented the constituency:

Year	Member	Political party
2011	C. Raveendranath	Communist Party of India (Marxist)
2016	C. Raveendranath	Communist Party of India (Marxist)
2021	K. K. Ramachandran	Communist Party of India (Marxist)
2026	K. K. Ramachandran	Communist Party of India (Marxist)

== Election results ==
=== 2026 ===
2026 Kerala Legislative Assembly election: Puthukkad
Party	Candidate	Votes	%	±%
CPI(M)	K. K. Ramachandran	63,136	40.95	▼5.99
INC	K. M. Baburaj	60,283	39.10	▲9.66
BJP	A. Nagesh	28,018	18.27	▼4.16
AAP	Jayakrishnan P. N.	863	0.56	
NOTA	None of the above	1,231	0.8	
Margin of victory		2,853	1.85	▼15.65
Turnout		1,54,161		
CPI(M) hold		Swing		

=== 2021 ===
There were 2,01,035 registered voters in the constituency for the 2021 election.

2021 Kerala Legislative Assembly election: Puthukkad
Party	Candidate	Votes	%	±%
CPI(M)	K. K. Ramachandran	73,365	46.94	▼3.07
INC	Sunil Anthikad	46,012	29.44	▲3.62
BJP	A. Nagesh	34,893	22.33	▼0.25
NOTA	None of the above	1,069	0.68	−
CPI(M-L)	Rajesh Appat	489	0.31	▲0.16
BSP	P. C. Pushpakaran	455	0.29	−
Margin of victory		27,353	17.50	▼6.75
Turnout		1,56,283	77.74	▼3.50
CPI(M) hold		Swing	▼3.07	

=== 2016 ===
There were 1,95,265 registered voters in the constituency for the 2016 election.

2016 Kerala Legislative Assembly election: Puthukkad
Party	Candidate	Votes	%	±%
CPI(M)	C. Raveendranath	79,464	50.07	▼2.77
INC	Sundaran Kunnathully	40,986	25.82	▼7.86
BJP	A. Nagesh	35,833	22.58	▲12.15
NOTA	None of the above	779	0.49	−
PDP	Asif Niyas	519	0.33	−
Independent	C. V. Vijayan	431	0.27	−
SS	Santhosh Polakulath	239	0.15	−
CPI(M-L)	Jayan Konikkara	237	0.15	−
Independent	Santhosh Iythadan	233	0,15	−
Margin of victory		38,478	24.25	▲5.29
CPI(M) hold		Swing	▼2.77	
Turnout		1,58,721	81.28	▲2.75

=== 2011 ===
There were 1,76,055 registered voters in the constituency for the 2011 election.

2011 Kerala Legislative Assembly election: Puthukkad
Party	Candidate	Votes	%	±%
CPI(M)	C. Raveendranath	73,047	52.84	
INC	K. P. Vishwanathan	46,565	33.68	
BJP	Sobha Surendran	14,425	10.43	
Independent	P. J. Monsy	2,084	1.51	
BSP	P. C. Pushpakaran	1,013	0.73	
Independent	Paulson Kalloor	622	0.45	
Independent	K. V. Purushottaman	495	0.36	
Margin of victory		26,482	19.16	
CPI(M) win (new seat)				
Turnout		1,38,251	78.53	
