= Kurumali River =

Tributary of the Karuvannur River in India

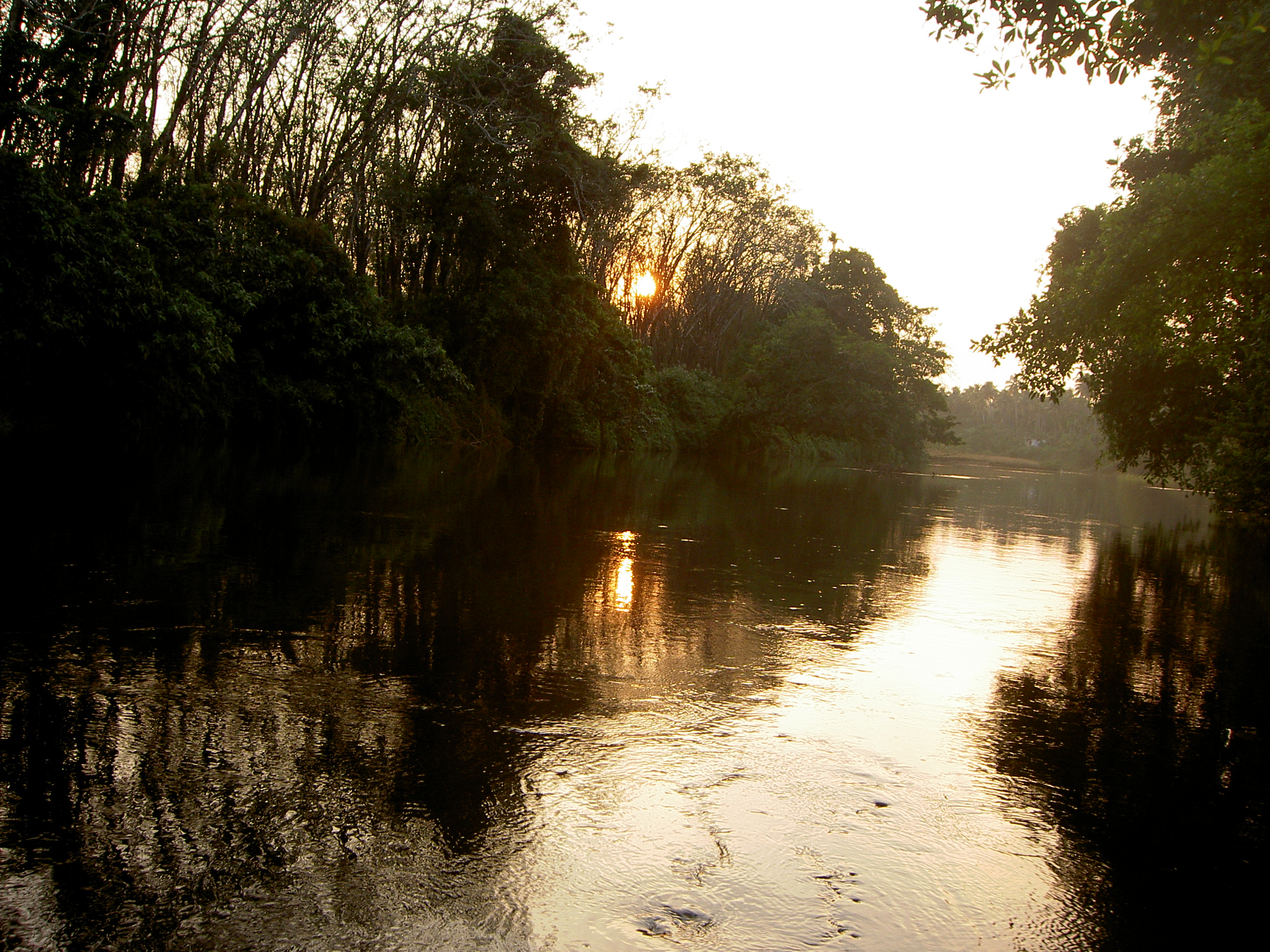
Dawn at Kurumaly river

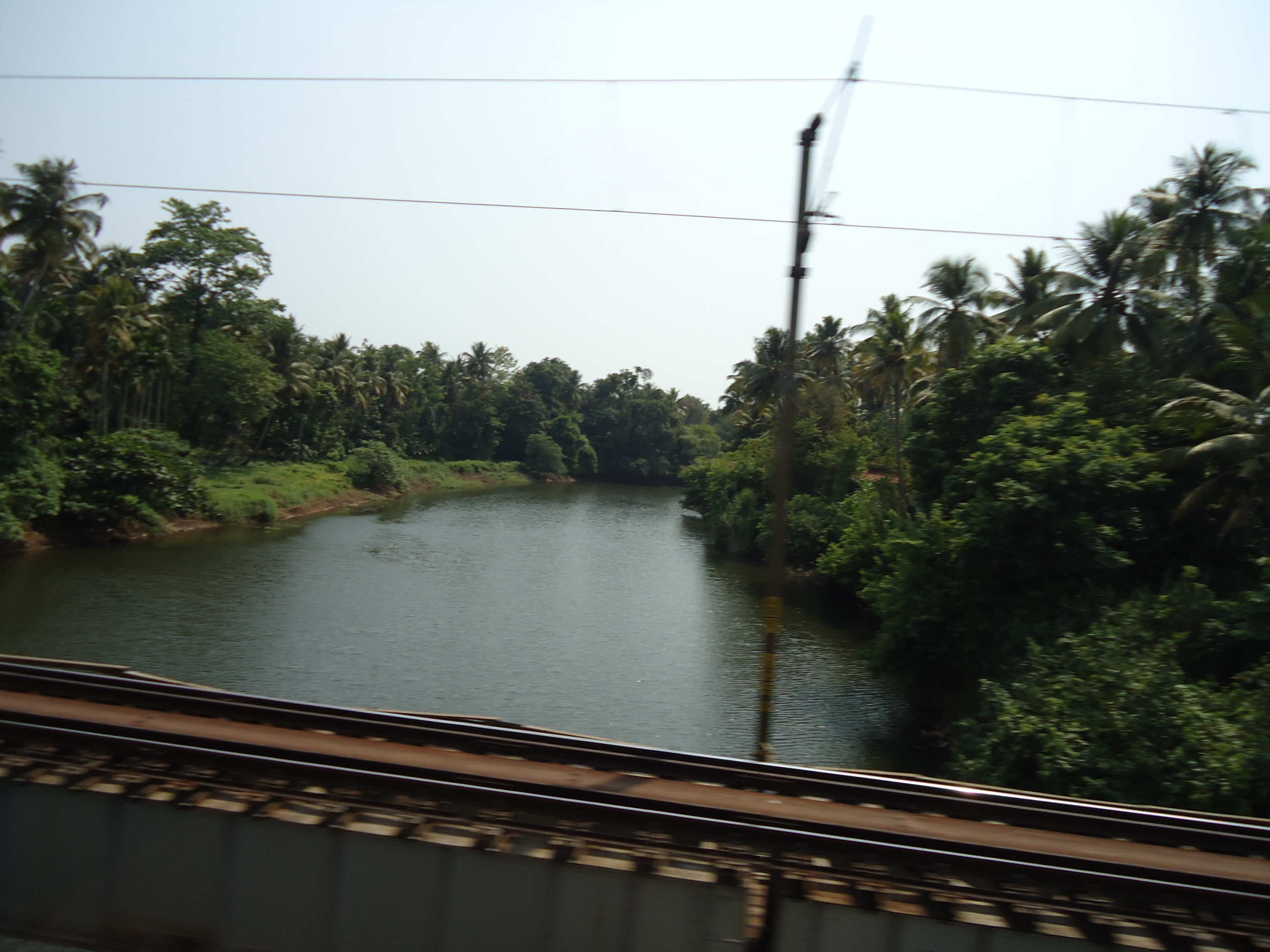
Kurumali river. View from Railway bridge near Pudukkad

The Kurumali River is a major tributary of the Karuvannur River in the Thrissur district of Kerala. It originates in the Western Ghats in the Chimmony Wildlife Sanctuary of Thrissur District.

== Course ==
The Kurumali River has its origin on the slopes of the Western Ghats in the Chimmony Wildlife Sanctuary of the Thrissur district. The Chimmony dam is built across the Kurumali River. The Muply River joins the Kurumali river in Karikulam. The river then passes the towns of Palappally, Vettingapadam, Varantharapally, Vellarampadam, Mupliyam, Panthallur, Nellayi, Nandikkara, Puthukad and Cheruvaal. Further downstream the Kurumali River joins with the Manali River at Arattupuzha forming the Karuvannur River.

== See also ==
- Cheruval – a village on the banks of the river
- Chimmony Dam – one of the main irrigation dams in Kerala is upstream this river.
