= Chimmini Wildlife Sanctuary =

Protected wildlife area in Kerala, India

- ചിമ്മിനി വന്യജീവി സങ്കേതം
- IUCN category IV (habitat/species management area)
- Location within Kerala Location within India
- Interactive map of Chimmini Wildlife Sanctuary
- Location: Thrissur District, Kerala, India
- Nearest city: Thrissur
- Coordinates: 10.438816°N 76.463417°E
- Area: 85.067 square kilometres (32.845 sq mi)
- Established: 1984 Chimmini dam Facebook Page

Chimmini Wildlife Sanctuary is a protected area located along the Western Ghats in Chalakudy taluk of Thrissur District of Kerala state in India.

Established in 1984, the sanctuary with an area of about 85.067 km^{2} is on the western slopes of the Nelliyampathi Hills. The highest peak in sanctuary is Punda Peak (1116 m). Along with the neighboring Peechi-Vazhani Wildlife Sanctuary it forms a continuous protected area of 210 km^{2}. It also lies just west of Parambikulam Wildlife Sanctuary, providing some habitat connectivity with the forests of that relatively large protected area. The sanctuary consists of the watershed areas of Kurumali River and Mupliam rivers. Nestled in the sanctuary is Chimmony Dam which is built across the Chimmini river.

The headquarters of the sanctuary is at Echippara which is 40 km away from City of Thrissur. The sanctuary also offers trekking paths for the adventure traveller. Accommodation can be arranged at the Inspection Bungalow, near the Chimmini Dam.

Visit permits can be obtained from: The Wildlife Warden, Peechi Wildlife Division, Peechi 680653. It comes under the Peechi Wild Life Division.
