= Manali River =

Location
- Country: India

Physical characteristics
- Source
  - location: Peechi-Vazhani Wildlife Sanctuary
- Mouth
  - location: Thrissur Kole Wetlands

The Manali River is a major tributary of the Karuvannur River of the Thrissur district in Kerala. The river merges with the Kurumali River and forms the Karuvannur River at Palakadavu. The Peechi Dam was constructed across the Manali River.
