= Nandipulam =

- village
- Location in Kerala, India Nandipulam (India)
- Coordinates: 10°23′25″N 76°19′25″E
- Country: India
- State: Kerala
- District: Thrissur

Government
  - Body: Non

Population (2011)
  - Total: 5,529

Languages
  - Official: Malayalam, English
- Time zone: UTC+5:30 (IST)
- PIN: 680312
- Vehicle registration: KL-45

Nandipulam is a village in Varandarappilly panchayath in Thrissur district in the state of Kerala, India.

== Location ==
Nandipulam is about 4 km from NH544-Pudukkad, and 4 km from NH544-Kodakara.

== Churches ==
St. Mary's church Nandipulam

St. Mary's church Nandipulam (Manjoor)

== Temples ==
Kumaranchira Bhagavathy Temple, Payyoorkkavu Bhagavathy Temple, Mithrananthapuram Sree Krishna Temple, Edaleppilly Bhagavathy Temple

== Demographics ==
As of 2011 India census, Nandipulam had a population of 5529 with 2663 males and 2866 females.
