= Chimmini Dam =

Dam in Thrissur District, Kerala, India

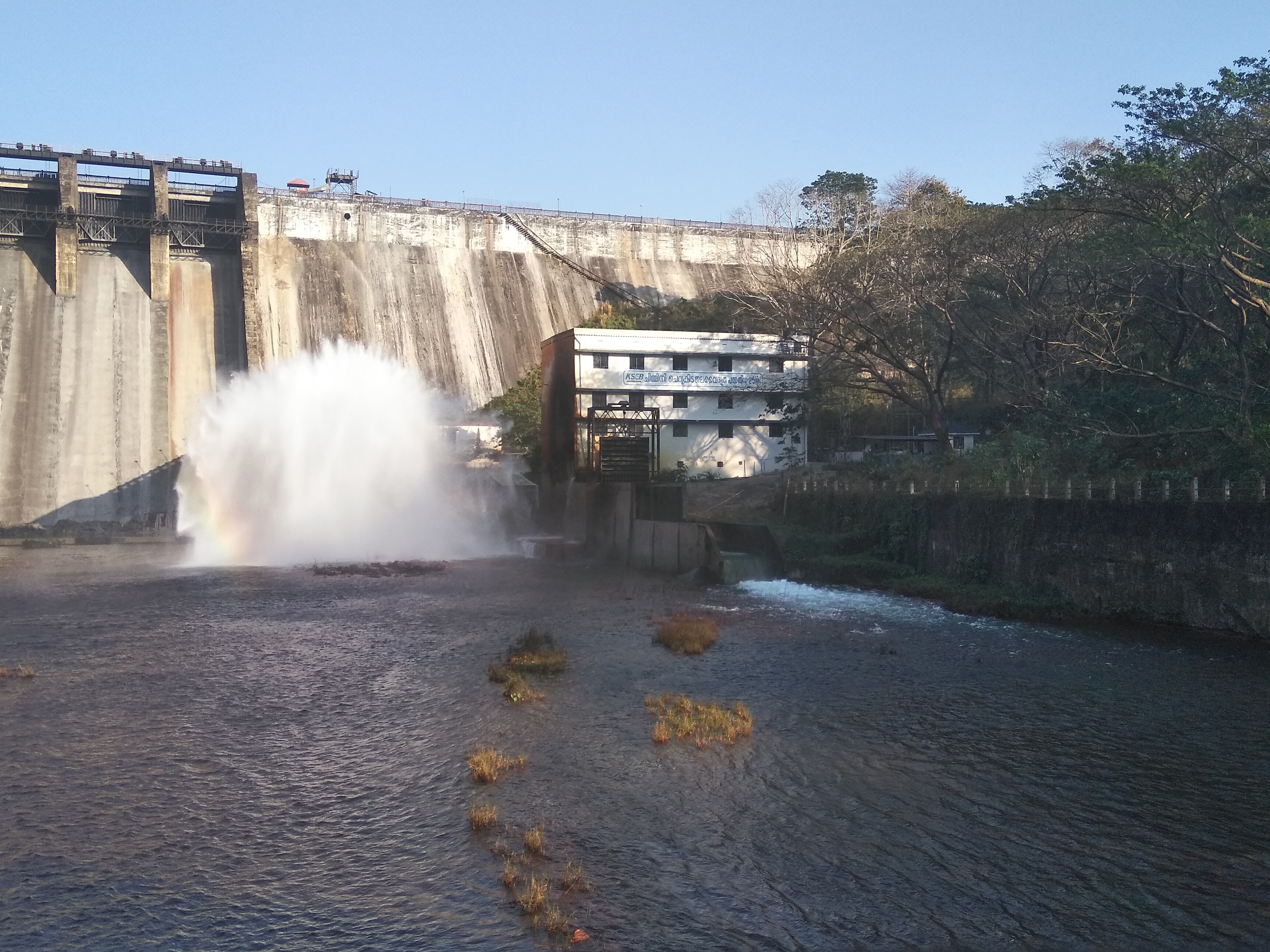
- Front view of Chimmini Dam

- Location within India Location within Kerala
- Official name: Chimmini Dam
- Location: Thrissur District, Kerala
- Coordinates: 10.4391°N 76.4604°E
- Opening date: 1996
- Operator: Government of Kerala

Reservoir
- Creates: Chimmini River

Chimmini Dam is situated in Echippara in Chalakudy taluk of Thrissur District of Kerala state of India. It is constructed across Kurumali river, a tributary of the Karuvannur river. Chimmini is the largest dam of Thrissur district. The Chimminy Wild Life Sanctuary is located close to the dam. Construction of the 495-metre masonry and 686-metre earthen dam started in 1975 and it was completed in 1996. Total cost of the project was Rs 59.71 crore although the cost of construction of the dam was initially estimated at Rs 36.15 crore.

The reservoir attract tourists and there are coracles ride available at the reservoir. The dam was commissioned in 1996. One uniqueness about this dam is the absence of canal system. The water contained in the reservoir is made available to the Kole fields and paddy fields by means of the river and the existing canal system through a regulator. No artificial canal system was set up for this purpose.

Many different streams reach the Chimmini reservoir . The Chimmini Dam and the reservoir share borders with Mangalam Dam and the Parambikkulam Wildlife Reserve. The Chimmini catchment area is spread over a 10 square kilometre area within an area of 85 square kilometre which is declared as a reserve forest in 1984. Established in 1984, the Chimmini Wildlife Sanctuary is situated contiguous with the Peechi-Vazhani Sanctuary and spreads around 85.067 square kilometers. There is Bamboo Rafting, birding trail, butterfly safari, Jungle craft and animal tracking etc. for the tourists.

== Hydroelectric project ==
Chimmini Small Hydro Electric project envisages the usage of water from the Chimminy water which is primarily for irrigation purposes. The water first flows through a penstock system which is 30 meters in length to a Power station with a turbine of 2.5 Megawatt capacity. After the power generation the water is made available for irrigation purposes and flows to a canal system. It produces 6.7 Million units of electricity annually. The power is then fed to a substation at Puthukkad.

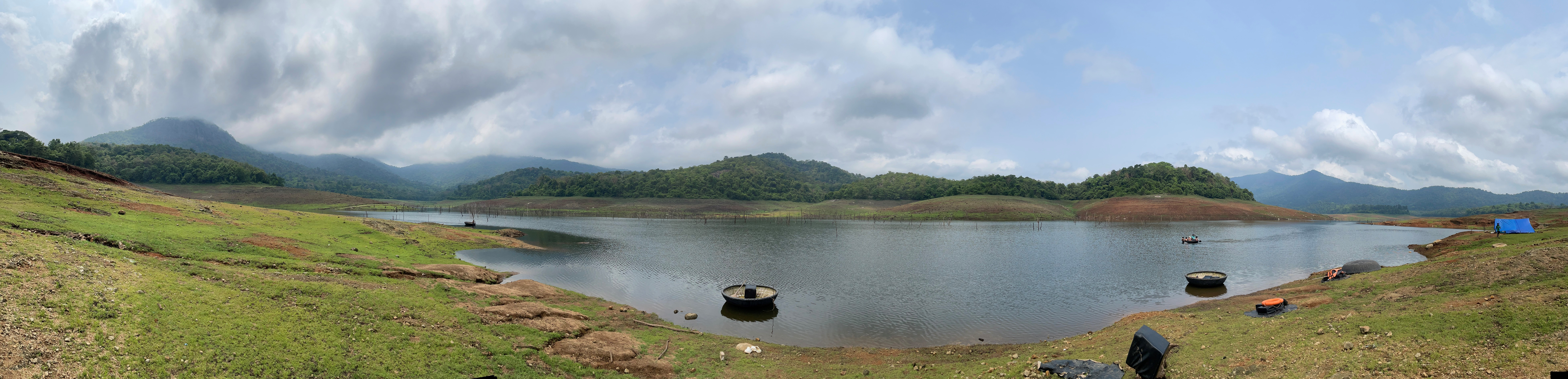
A panoramic view of Chimmini dam reservoir
