= Cheruval =

Cheruval Valiyakkunnu Vanasasth temple
- village
- Location in Kerala, India Cheruval (India)
- Coordinates: 10°24′0″N 76°14′0″E
- Country: India
- State: Kerala
- District: Thrissur

Languages
  - Official: Malayalam, English
- Time zone: UTC+5:30 (IST)
- PIN: 680301
- Telephone code: Thottippal Tel Exchange Code is +91 (0480)
- Nearest city: Pudukad -Irinjalakuda
- Literacy: 100%
- Lok Sabha constituency: Mukundapuram
- Climate: cool (Köppen)

Cheruval is a village in Thrissur district of Kerala, India. The main festivals of this village are the football tournament and "Desavilakku". The village has one school- JLPS-Janatha Lower Primary School, a football ground, many farms and the Manjamkuzhy Dam. The village is situated on the banks of the Kurumali River. The "NAVABHARAH SAMSKARIKA NILAYAM" is one of the cultural centre in this village. The village is approximately 1.2 km from the Puthukkad/Pudukad railway station.
