= Hello English (government program) =

- हेलो इंग्लिश
- Country: India
- Prime Minister(s): Narendra Modi
- Ministry: Minister for Education, Government of Kerala
- Key people: C. Raveendranath, Minister for Education
- Launched: 2016
- Status: active

Hello English is an Indian government program initiated by the Government of Kerala. The program is launched under Sarva Shiksha Abhiyan (SSA). Hello English was officially inaugurated by C. Raveendranath, Minister for Education of the Government of Kerala. The program was launched with an aim of improving the English language skills of students of government and aided schools. The initiative aims at enabling the teachers and students to handle English language with improved proficiency. The initiative was launched in 2016.
