= K. K. Ramachandran =

Indian politician

- കെ കെ രാമചന്ദ്രൻ

Member of the Kerala Legislative Assembly for Puthukkad
- Incumbent
- Assumed office May 2021

Personal details
- Born: 12 March 1968 (age 58) Pudukkad, Kerala
- Party: Communist Party of India Marxist
- Spouse: Subi Ramachandran
- Children: 2
- Parents: Kumaran (late) (father); Devaki (mother)
- Education: Thayagarajar High School, Alagappanagar

K. Kumaran Ramachandran is an Indian politician and social worker from Kerala, who currently serves as the MLA of Puthukkad constituency since May 2021. He is a member of the Communist Party of India (Marxist). He started his political career with Students' Federation of India (SFI) at time of his high school life. He was former SFI Thrissur district Vice-President and DYFI Thrissur District Treasurer, State Committee Member. Currently he is Thrissur District President of CITU and Central Working Committee Member. Since 2012 he has been the member of CPI(M) Thrissur District Secretariat.

== Early life ==
He was born on 12 March 1968 in Thalavanikkara, Puthukkad Thrissur.

== Political life ==
K. K. Ramachandran started his public career with the Red Flag at a very young age. During his education at Alagappanagar High School, he excelled in organizing as Speaker and Deputy Leader and became SFI Kodakara Area Secretary. He mobilized students under the white flag and became a Vice-President of SFI Thrissur District committee. He then became an organizer who forgot himself in the youth arena. In recognition of his organizational excellence, he was promoted to the post of DYFI Kodakara Block Secretary. At the age of 26, Ramachandran was elected Block Secretary of DYFI. From 2003-2012 he worked as Kodakara Area Secretary of CPI(M) Kodakara Area Committee. In 2012 he acted as District Secretariat Member of CPI(M).

== Elections ==
YEAR	CONSTITUENCY	WINNER	PARTY AND GROUP	DEFEATED CANDIDATE	PARTY AND GROUP
2021	Puthukkad	K K Ramachandran	Communist Party of India (Marxist)	Sunil Anthikkad	Indian National Congress
