= Mupliyam =

- Village
- Location in Kerala, India
- Coordinates: 10°24′0″N 76°20′30″E
- Country: India
- State: Kerala
- District: Thrissur

Languages
  - Official: Malayalam, English
- Time zone: UTC+5:30 (IST)
- PIN: 680312
- Vehicle registration: KL-
- Nearest city: Thrissur
- Lok Sabha constituency: Thrissur

Mupliyam is a small village near Pudukkad town in the Thrissur district of Kerala state, South India. It is located 9 km away from NH 544 from Pudukad, which is 13 km from Thrissur town. Mupliyam comes under Chalakudy Taluk and Varandarappilly Panchayath. The river which passes through Mupliyam becomes the Kurumali River (Mupliyam River). Muniyattukunnu of Mupliyam is renowned for its dolmens, which were declared a protected monument as per Government proceeding. Only one dolmen stands intact at Muniyattukunnu. The rest have been destroyed by quarrying in the area. India.

== Schools ==
- Govt Higher Secondary School
- Vimal Jyothy Central School

== Churches ==
- Assumption Church, Mupliyam
- Little Flower Church, Vellarampadam.

== Temples ==
- Madapplilli Kaavu Temple
- Muthumala Sree Subramanya Swami Temple
- Panchamoorthy temple
- Kalleli Sree Dharma Sastha temple, Pidikkaparambu
- Mahavishnu temple, Pidikkaparamb

== Bank ==
- South Indian Bank, Mupliyam
- Inchakundu Service Cooperative Bank

== Government Offices ==
- Village Office Mupliyam.
- Post Office Mupliyam

== Primary Health Centers ==
- Mupliyam Government Primary Health center.
- Mupliyam Government Homeo Dispensary.
