= Varandarappilly =

- town
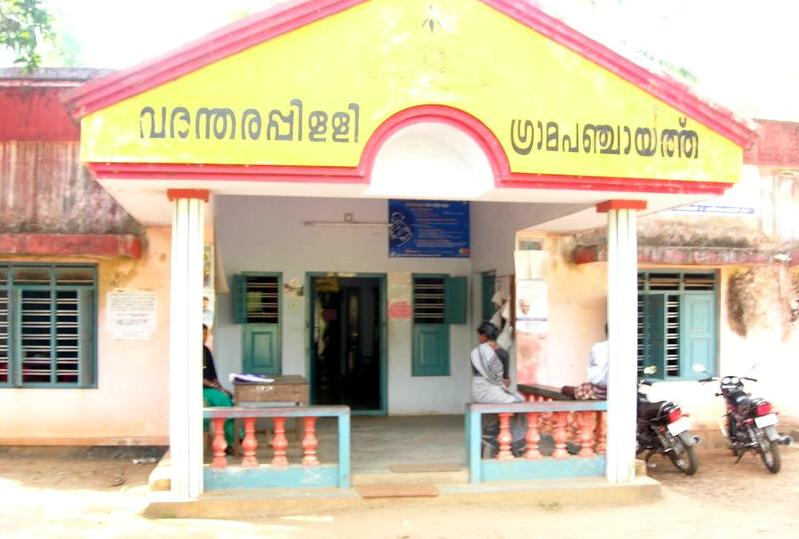
- Panchayat Office
- Interactive map of Varandarappilly
- Coordinates: 10°25′0″N 76°20′0″E
- Country: India
- State: Kerala
- District: Thrissur

Government
  - Body: Varandarapilly Grama Panchayath

Languages
  - Official: Malayalam, English
- Time zone: UTC+5:30 (IST)
- Vehicle registration: KL-08 & KL-45

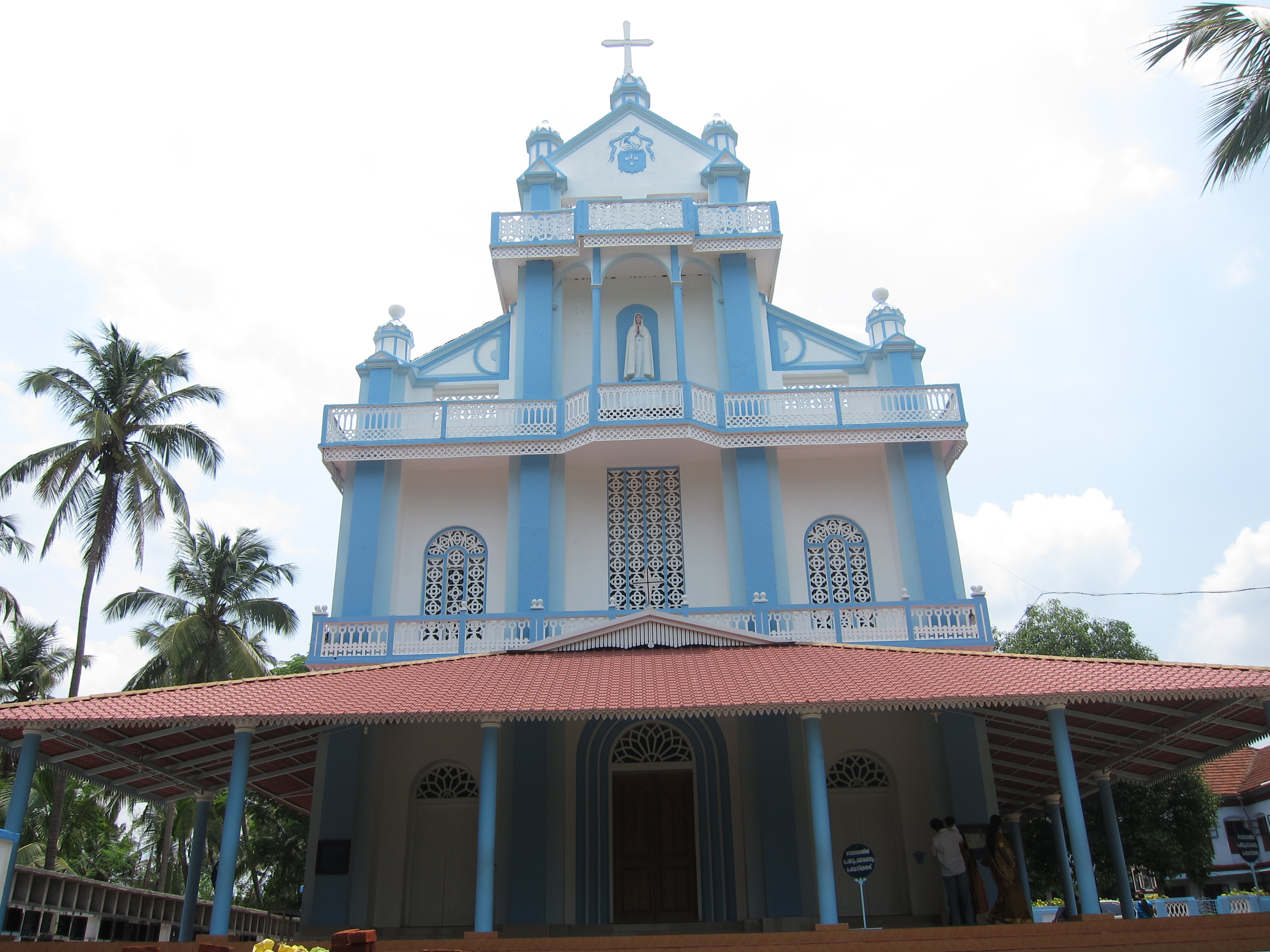
Vimalahridaya Naadha Church

Varandarappilly is a panchayat near Puthukkad town in Thrissur district, Kerala, India. It is located 22 km from Thrissur City and 65 km from Kochi city. The Panchayath area is 102 km² and it has a population 27,343. Nandipulam, Mupliyam, Velupadam, Palappilly, and Kallayi are nearby villages. Alagappa Nagar, Mattathur and Puthukkad are the neighbouring Panchayaths. It is the hometown for Chemmannur group in the field of gold jewellery manufacturing.
