= Peechi-Vazhani Wildlife Sanctuary =

Wildlife sanctuary headquartered in Peechi, Thrissur District of Kerala, India

- പീച്ചി- വാഴാനി വന്യജീവി സങ്കേതം
- IUCN category IV (habitat/species management area)
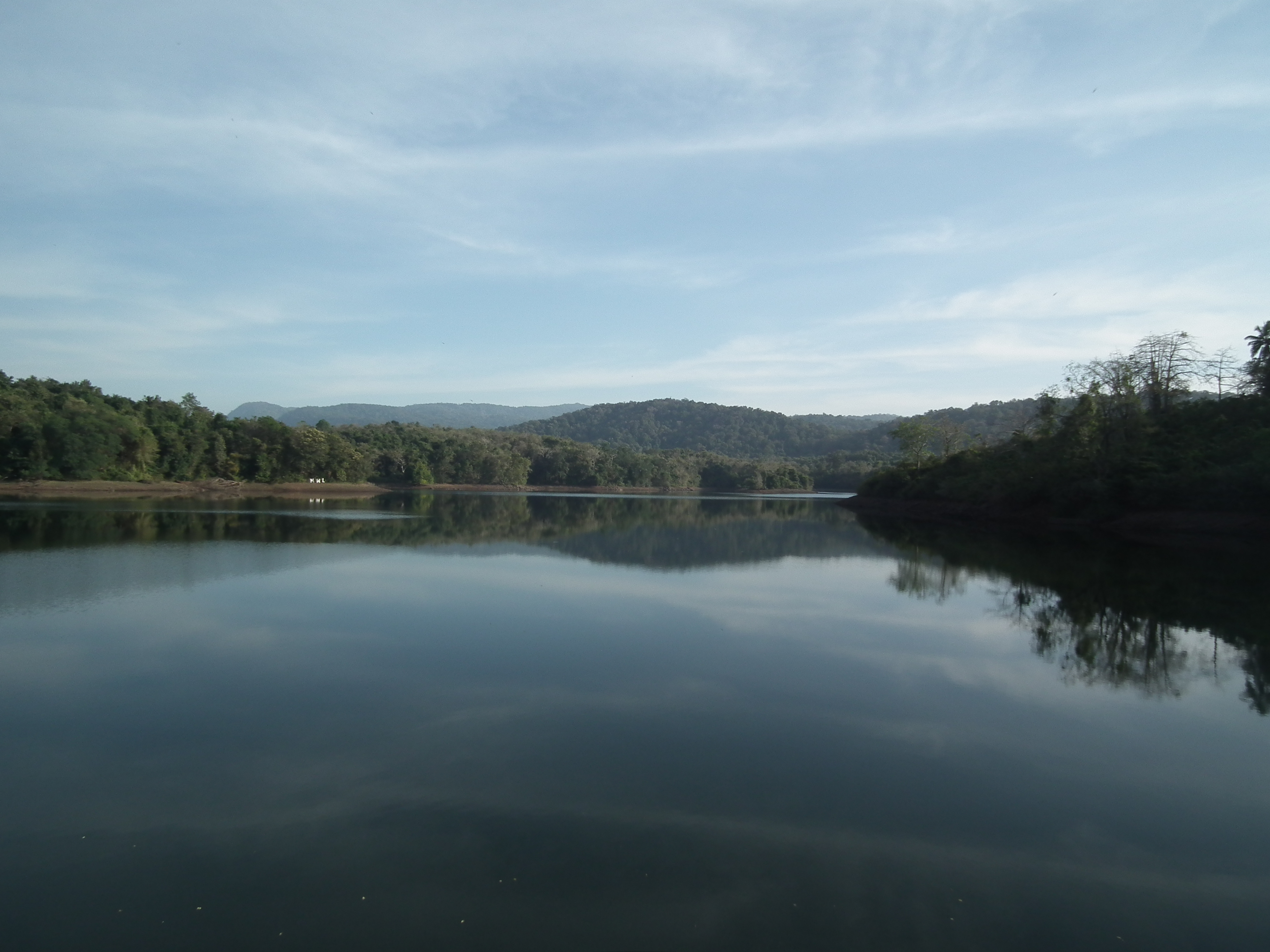
- A view of Peechi-Vazhani Wildlife Sanctuary from Peechi Dam

- Location within Kerala Location within India
- Interactive map of Peechi-Vazhani Wildlife Sanctuary
- Location: Thrissur Taluk & Talappilly Taluk Thrissur District, Kerala, India
- Nearest city: Thrissur
- Coordinates: 10°28′52″N 76°26′46″E
- Area: 125 km^{2} (48 sq mi)
- Established: 1958
- Governing body: Government
- Website: www.peechi.org

Peechi-Vazhani Wildlife Sanctuary is a wildlife sanctuary headquartered in Peechi, Thrissur District of Kerala, India. The sanctuary was established in 1958 consisting of Palappilli- Nelliyampathi forests including the area of Chimmony Wildlife sanctuary and is the second-oldest sanctuary in Kerala.

The average summer temperature is 38 °C (100 °F). The average winter temperature is 15 °C (59 °F).
