= Nenmanikkara =

- Census town
- Location in Kerala, India
- Coordinates: 10.4392°N 76.268°E
- Country: India
- State: Kerala
- District: Thrissur

Population (2001)
  - Total: 17,406

Languages
  - Official: Malayalam, English
- Time zone: UTC+5:30 (IST)

Nenmanikkara is a census town in Thrissur district in the Indian state of Kerala. It lies nearer to NH544 near Amballur town. Nenmanikkara has vast area of landscape.

== Demographics ==
As of 2001 India census, Nenmanikkara had a population of 17,406. Males constitute 49% of the population and females 51%. Nenmanikkara has an average literacy rate of 83%, higher than the national average of 59.5%: male literacy is 85%, and female literacy is 80%. In Nenmanikkara, 11% of the population is under 6 years of age.
