= Karuvannoor =

- Village
- Location in Kerala , India
- Coordinates: 10°23′0″N 76°12′0″E
- Country: India
- State: Kerala
- District: Thrissur

Government
  - Body: Cherpu Grama Panchayath, Irinjalakkuda Municipality

Languages
  - Official: Malayalam, English
- Time zone: UTC+5:30 (IST)
- PIN: 680711
- Vehicle registration: KL- 08 / KL - 45
- Nearest city: Thrissur / Irinjalakkuda
- Lok Sabha constituency: Thrissur

Karuvannoor is a village in Irinjalakuda municipality of Trichur, Kerala, India bordered by Urakam and Arattupuzha in the North and Moorkanade, Mapranam and Karalam in the south. The Karuvannur river passes through the village, resulting in its name. The name is also spelled Karuvanoore, Karuvanur, Karuvanure, Karuvannur or Karuvannure.
