= Nellayi =

- Village
- Location in Kerala, India Nellayi (India)
- Coordinates: 10°24′0″N 76°18′0″E
- Country: India
- State: Kerala
- District: Thrissur

Government
  - Body: Parappukkara Grama Panchayath, Pudukkad Grama Panchayath

Languages
  - Official: Malayalam, English
- Time zone: UTC+5:30 (IST)
- PIN: 680305
- Vehicle registration: KL-45

Nellayi is a village in Kerala, India, located 20 kilometres (12 mi) towards south of Thrissur. National Highway 544 (NH 544) passes through the village. Nellayi also has a railway station and place where station situated is at Pongotra, which is 1.5 km from Highway(Nellayi-irinjalakuda road) and a Vyloor Shiva temple, Vyloor Nellayi. The village was mentioned in the Malayalam movie Passenger.

Nellayi was an assembly seat in old country Kochi. The assembly seat comes under Pudukkad constituency. Nellayi is a part of parpukkara grama Panchayat.
