= C. Raveendranath =

Indian politician

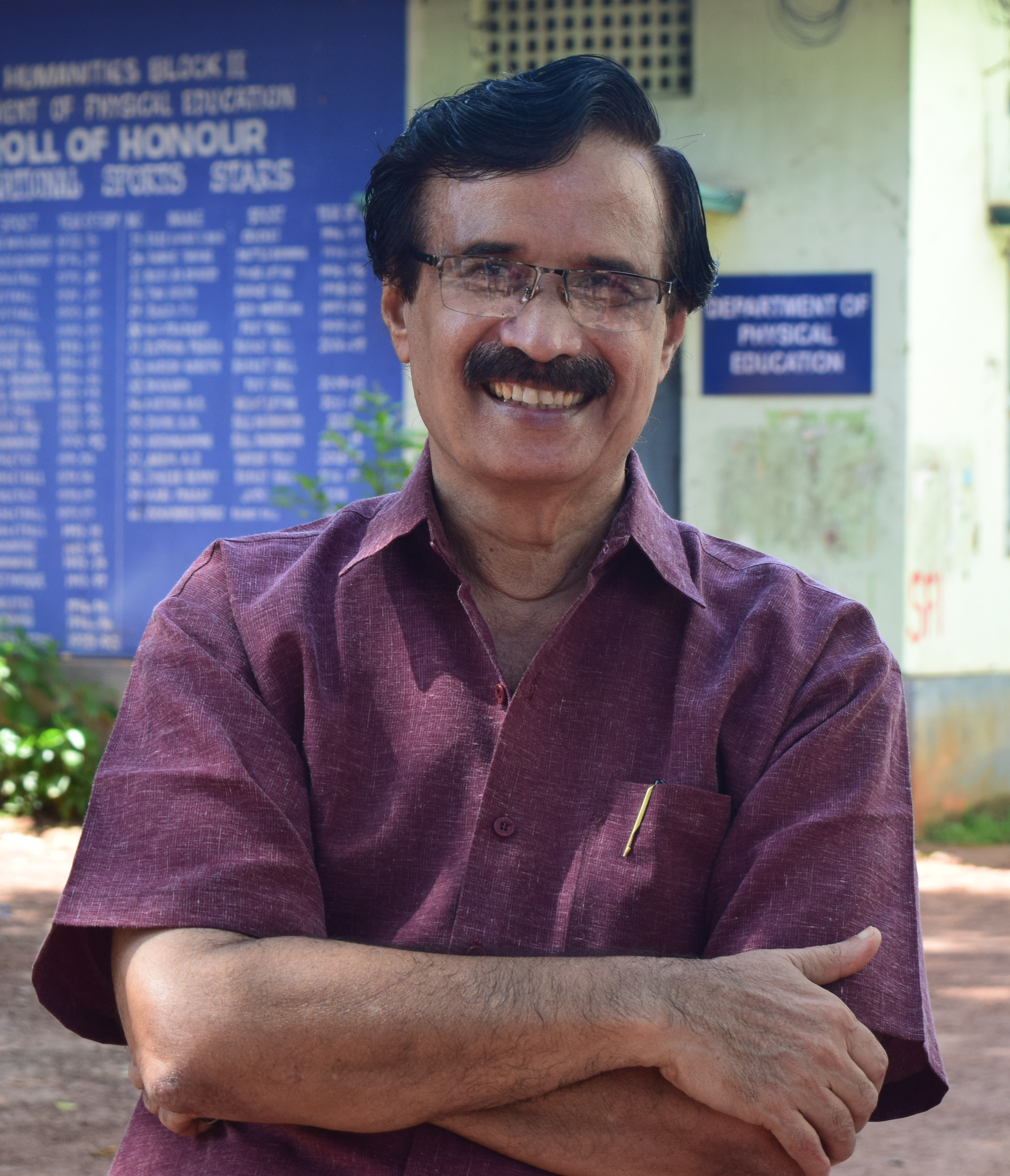
- C. Raveendranath at Kerala Varma College, Thrissur

Minister for General Education, Government of Kerala
- In office 14 August 2018 – 3 May 2021
- Preceded by: Himself
- Succeeded by: V. Sivankutty
- Constituency: Puthukkad
- In office 25 May 2016 – 14 August 2018
- Preceded by: P. K. Abdu Rabb
- Succeeded by: Himself (General Education); K. T. Jaleel (Higher Education)
- Constituency: Puthukkad

Personal details
- Born: 22 November 1955 (age 70) Nellayi, Thrissur, Kerala, India
- Party: Communist Party of India (Marxist)
- Spouse: M. K. Vijayam
- Children: 2
- Parents: K. Peethambaran Kartha; C. Lekshmikutty Kunjamma
- Profession: Professor; Politician

Cheranalloor Raveendranath (born 22 November 1955) is an Indian politician and is the former Minister for General Education of the Government of Kerala in the first Pinarayi Vijayan Ministry. Now he is elected from Manalur Assembly constituency.He is a Communist Party of India (Marxist) politician from Thrissur and the member of the Kerala Legislative Assembly from Puthukkad Assembly constituency since 2011. He is a retired chemistry professor of St. Thomas College, Thrissur.

He had also worked as the resource person of Total Literacy Programme, consultant to the State Planning Board, district convenor of People's Planning programme. Officials remember him tapping MLA-MP funds and three-tier panchayats for implementing projects in agriculture, horticulture, floriculture and in dairying. Some of the projects include ‘Nivedya Kadali' of providing bananas to Guruvayur temple, supplying organic vegetables to Oushadhi, a state government entity producing Ayurvedic medicines, Natural Fresh Milk Scheme for supply in Thrissur town. He also got as many as 150 classrooms in 79 schools converted into high-tech classrooms.

== Personal life ==
He was born to K. Peethambaran Kartha and C. Lekshmikutty Kunjamma on 22 November 1955. He has three siblings. He is married to M. K. Vijayam and they have two children.

== Career ==
He has a master's degree in Science and was a Chemistry professor in St. Thomas College, Thrissur. He is an active worker of the CPI(M), Area Committee Member and the Kerala Sastra Sahithya Parishad.

== Books ==
He has written three books

- Niyamasabhaprasangangal (നിയമസഭാപ്രസംഗങ്ങൾ)
- Navalibaral athava Drurithangalude Nayam (നവലിബറൽ അഥവാ ദുരിതങ്ങളുടെ നയം)
- ASEAN Kararinte Yatharthyangal (ആസിയാൻകരാറിന്റെ യാഥാർത്ഥ്യങ്ങൾ)
