= Puthukkad =

- Town
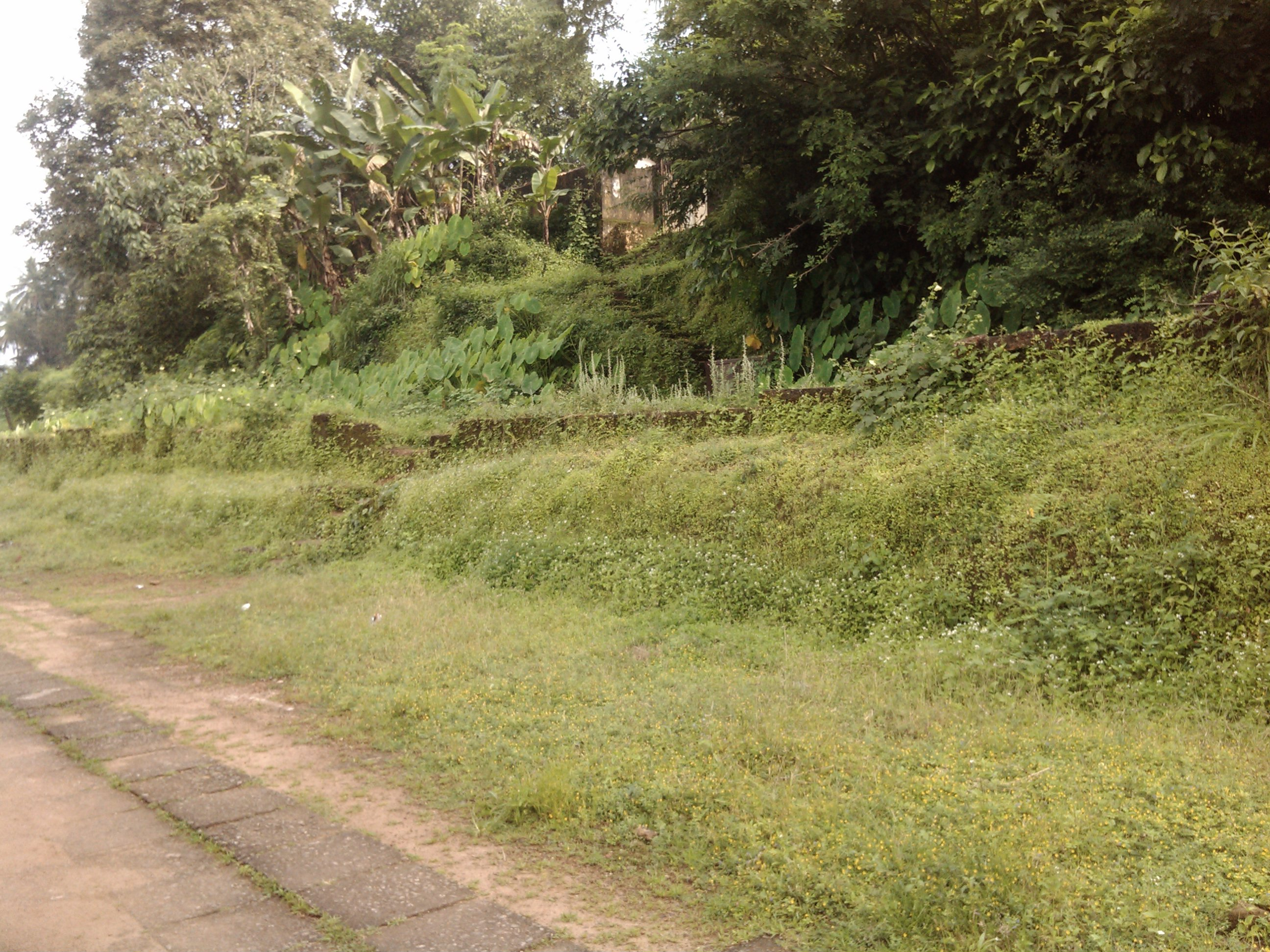
- Pudukkad

- Location in Kerala, India Puthukkad (India)
- Coordinates: 10.417609°N 76.270361°E
- Country: India
- State: Kerala
- District: Thrissur District
- Elevation: 20 m (66 ft)

Languages
  - Official: Malayalam, English, Hindi
- Time zone: UTC+5:30 (IST)
- PIN: 680301
- Telephone code: 0480
- Temperature Range: 22.5°C - 35 °C

Puthukkad is a town on the banks of Kurumali River, also known as Mupliyam River, in Kerala. The town is 15 km (9.3 mi) to the south of Thrissur city, 16 km (9.9 mi) to the north of Chalakudy, and 1.2 km (0.75 mi) west of Cheruval. The National highway NH 544 passes through this town.

== Transportation ==
Pudukad( Code -PUK) railway station is on the Irinjalakuda-Thrissur railway line. Both KSRTC and private bus services connect Puthukkad to Thrissur, Mannuthy, Palakkad in the north, Kodakara, Irinjalakuda, Chalakudy, Kottayam and Ernakulam almost all areas in Kerala , Near Pudukad Railway Station and Ernakulam in the south, Palazhi and Thottippal in the west and Mupliyam and Chengaloor in the east.All Major Private Tourist bus services towards Bangalore, Hyderabad, Chennai and Mangalore has boarding point at Puthukkad junction.Also all types of KSRTC Buses have boarding point at Puthukkad KSRTC Bus stand

The Cochin International Airport at Nedumbassery, Kochi is located approximately 35 km (22 mi) south of Puthukkad.

== Educational institutions ==
- St Antony's Higher Secondary School
- Mary Matha I.C.S.E School
- Prajyoti Niketan College, Pudukkad
- Govt Vocational Highschool
- MCA centre of Calicut University

== Demographics ==
As of 2001 India census, Puthukkad had a population of 12,500. Males constitute 48% of the population and females 52%. Pudukkad has an average literacy rate of 84%, higher than the national average of 59.5%: male literacy is 85%, and female literacy is 83%. In Pudukkad, 11% of the population is under 6 years of age.

== Personalities ==
- Chelat Achutha Menon, former Chief Minister of Kerala.
- C. Raveendranath, former Minister of Education.
- Arun Lohidakshan, Former Railway Advisory Board member and Professor
- K K Ramachandran , MLA
- Navin Joy Thattil , AI Startup Investor.
