= Peechi Dam =

Peechi Dam thrissur
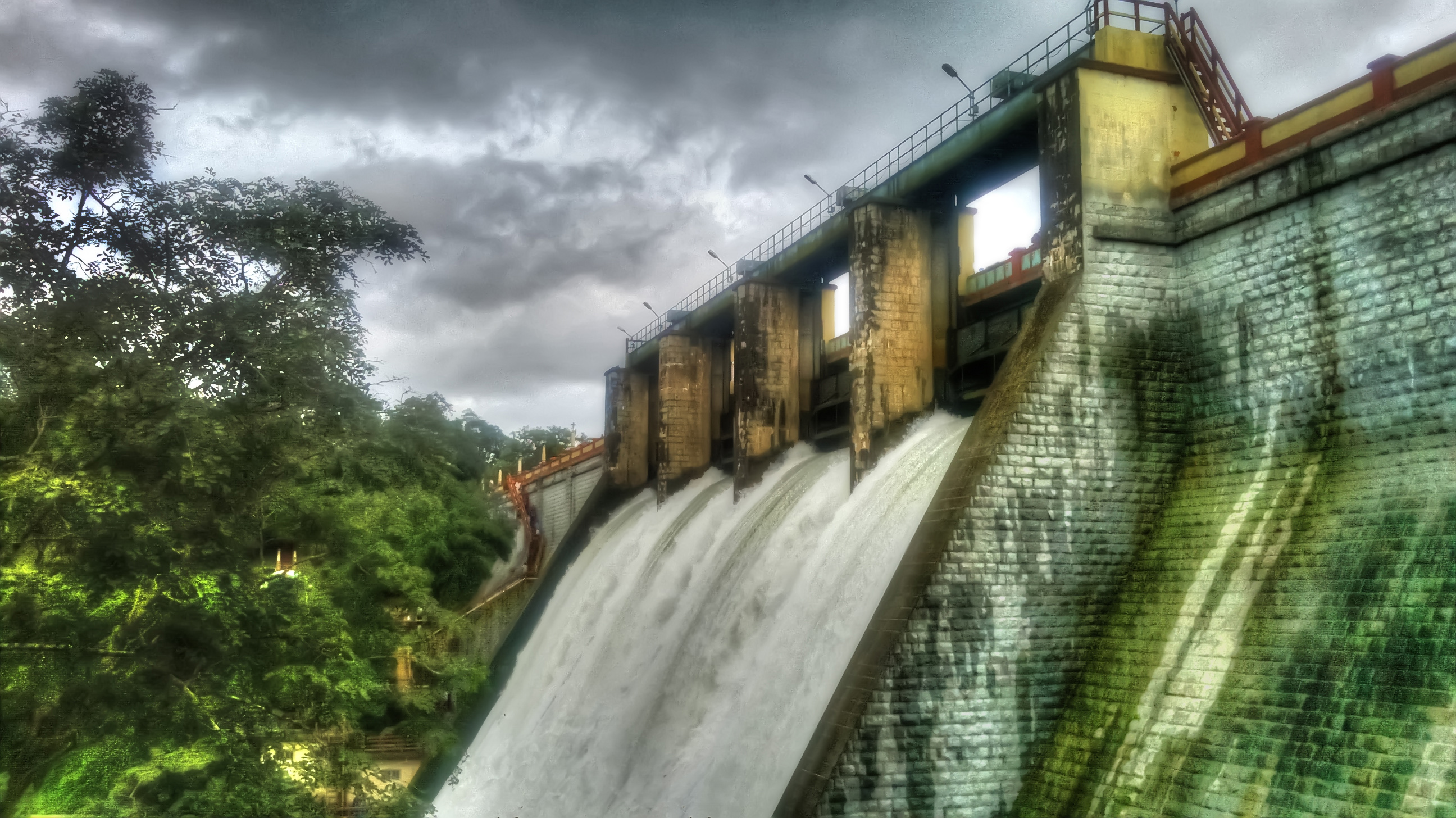
- Shutters of Peechi Dam

- Location within India Location within Kerala Location within India
- Official name: Peechi Dam
- Location: Peechi, Thrissur, Kerala, India
- Coordinates: 10.530°N 76.370°E
- Construction began: 1947
- Opening date: 1957
- Operators: Irrigation Department, Kerala

Dam and spillways
- Height: 49.8 m (163 ft)
- Length: 213 m (699 ft)
- Width (base): 4.27 m (14.0 ft)

Reservoir
- Creates: Manali River

Peechi Dam thrissur is situated 22 km (14 mi) outside Thrissur city in Kerala, India. The dam was started as an irrigation project for the surrounding villages in Thrissur. At the same time, it caters the drinking water needs of the population of Thrissur City. It serves as an irrigation dam, reaching out to the paddy fields in and around Thrissur city. Built across the Manali River, the dam has a catchment area of nearly 3,200 acres (1,300 ha). Elephants may be seen on the bank of Peechi-Vazhani Wildlife Sanctuary, established in 1958, covering 125 square kilometres (48 sq mi).

== History ==
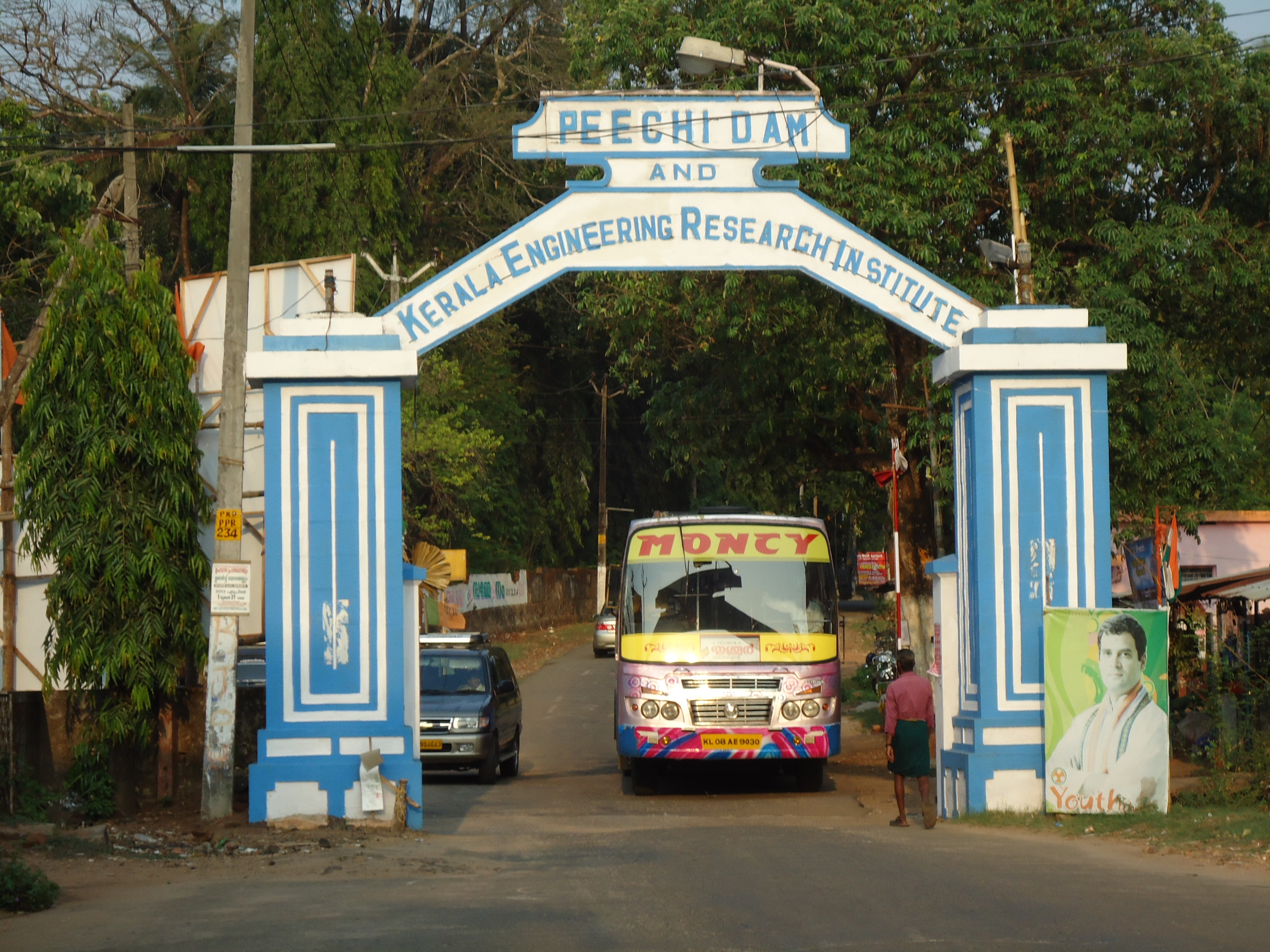
Entrance of Peechi Dam

E. Ikkanda Warrier (1890–1977), the first Prime Minister of the then independent state of Kochi, India, was the architect of Peechi Dam. Majority of the Thrissukkar opposed the dam cutting across the partyline. He brought a retired chief engineer from Andhra Pradesh to build the dam as engineers from Kerala opposed the project. The dam was completed in 1959. Burgula Ramakrishna Rao, first Kerala Governor, inaugurated the dam on 4 October 1957.

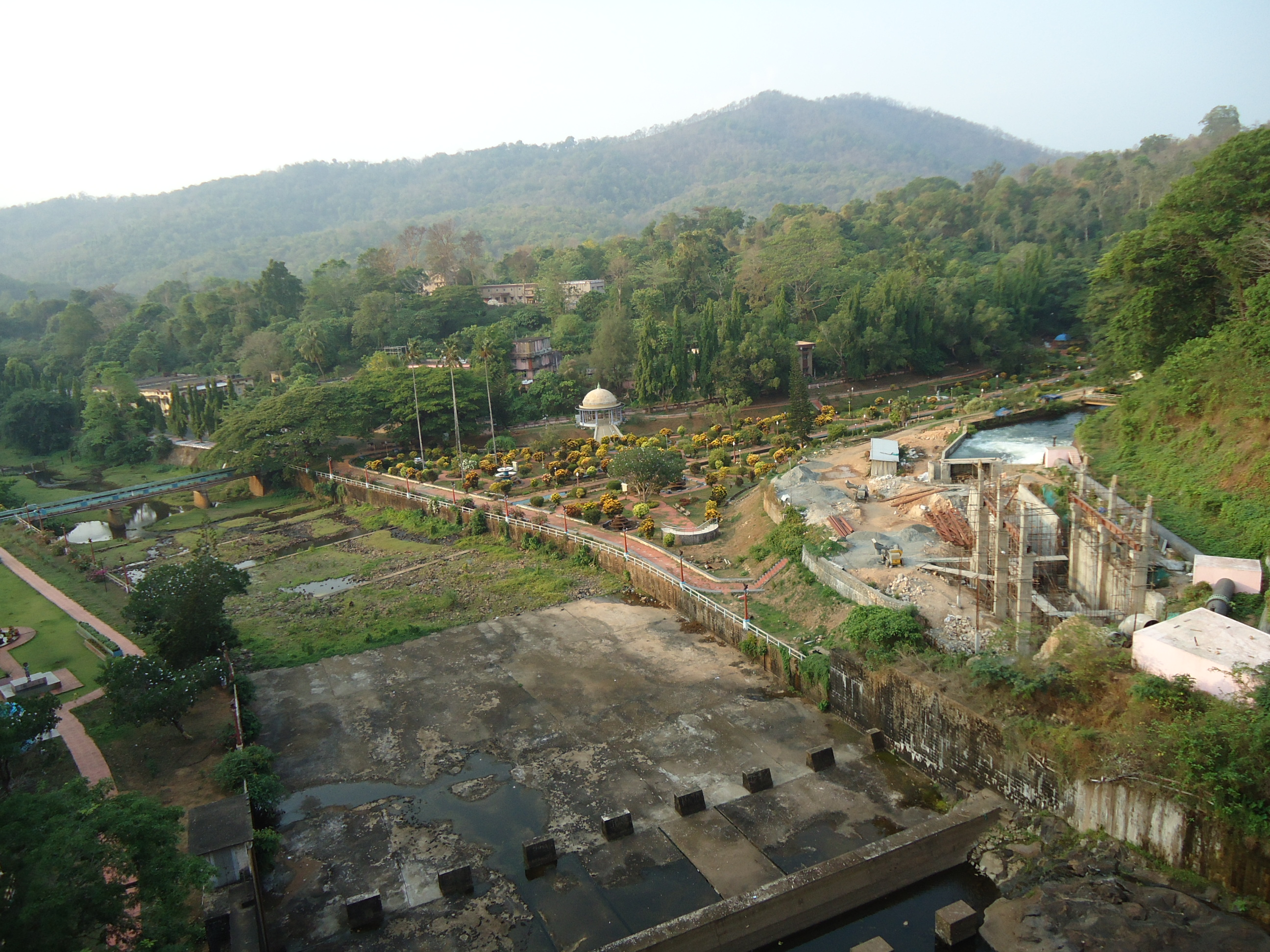
A view of Peechi-Vazhani Wildlife Sanctuary from Peechi Dam

=== Statistics ===
- Peechi Dam is one of the oldest dams in Kerala
- Type of Dam: Concrete Straight Gravity

== Education ==
- Mercy Convent LP School, Peechi
- Govt. LP School, Peechi
- Government Higher Secondary School, Peechi

== See also ==
- List of dams and reservoirs in India
