= Thrissur district =

District in Kerala, India

Thrissur district Trichur district
- District
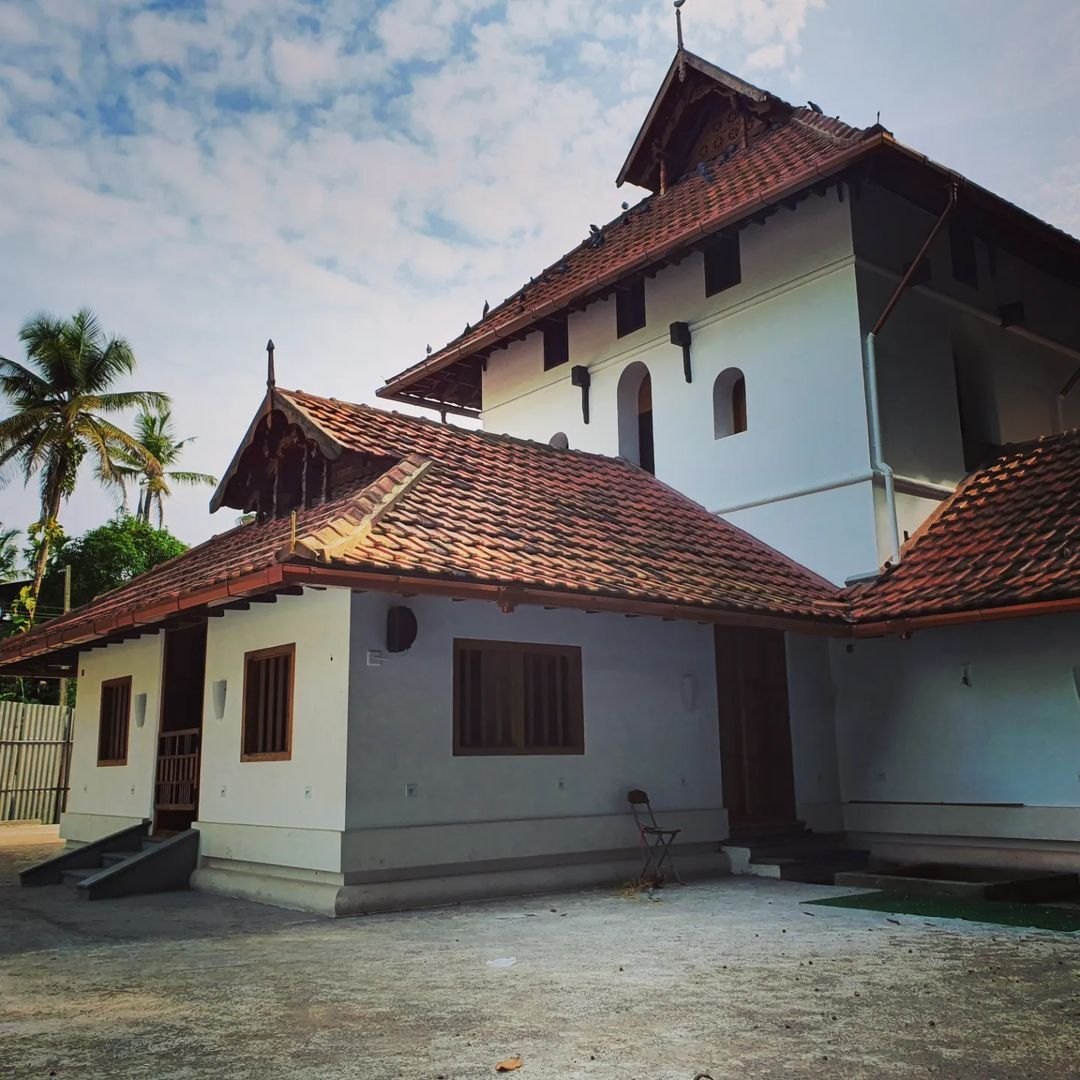
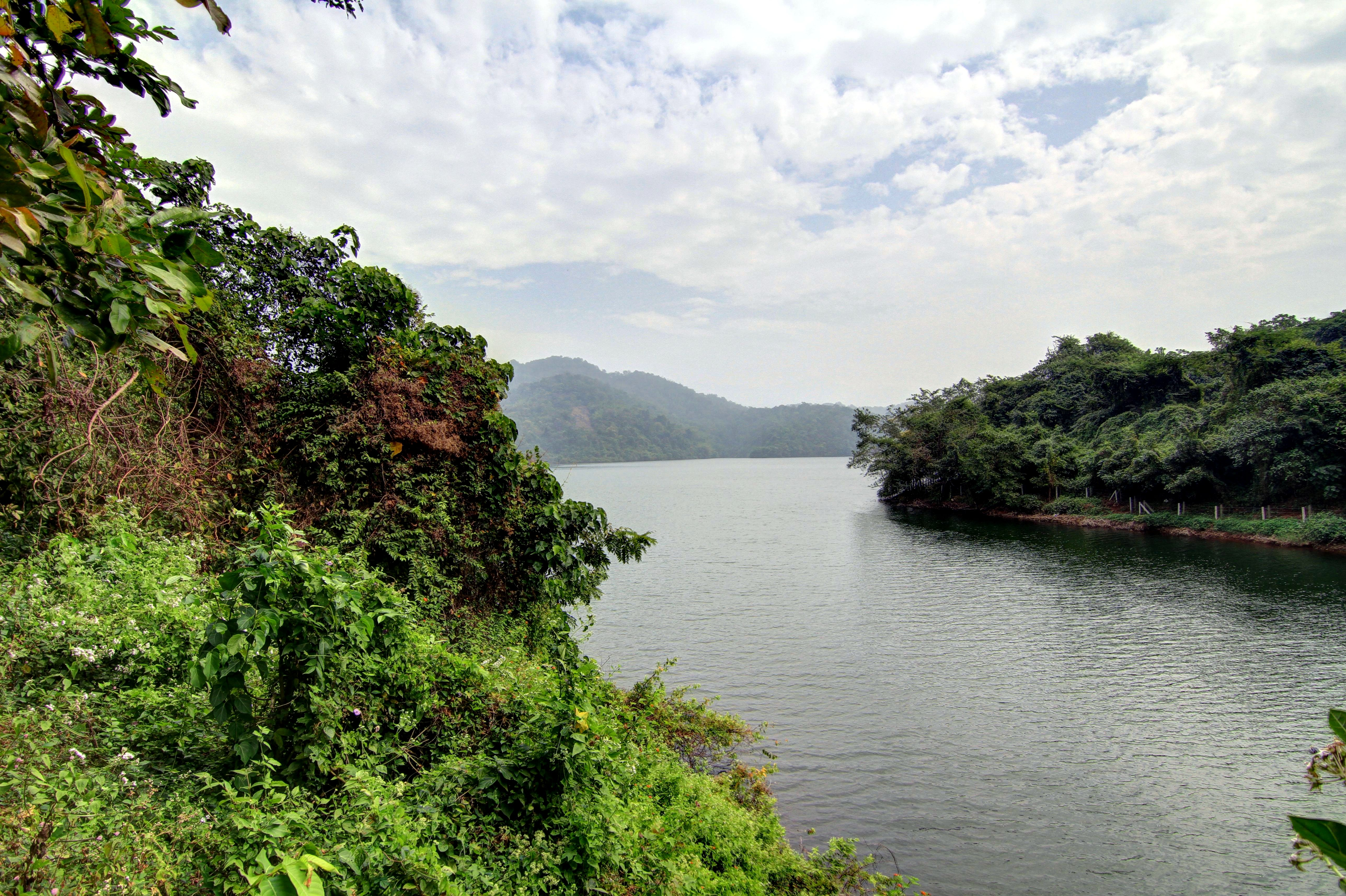
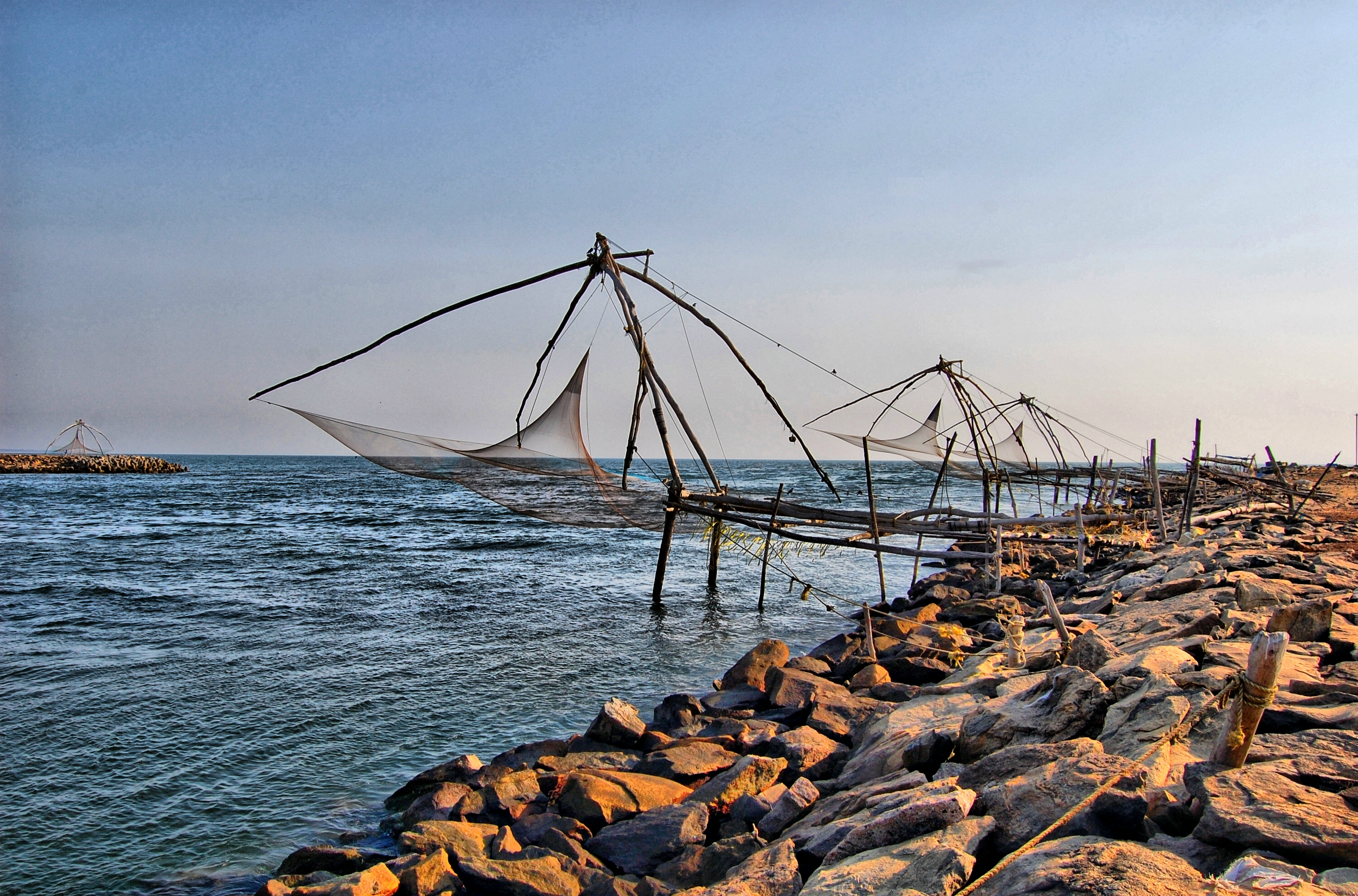
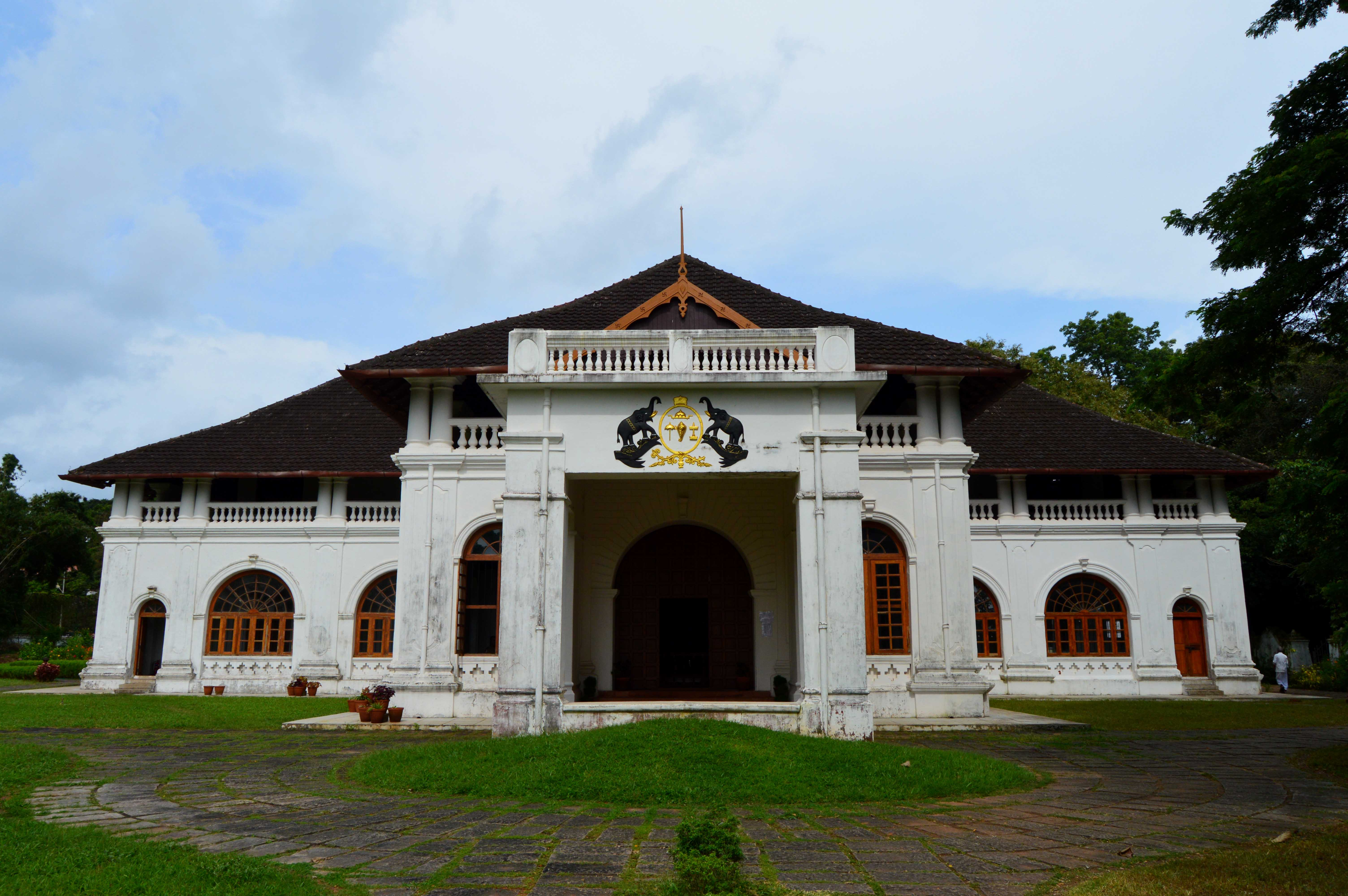
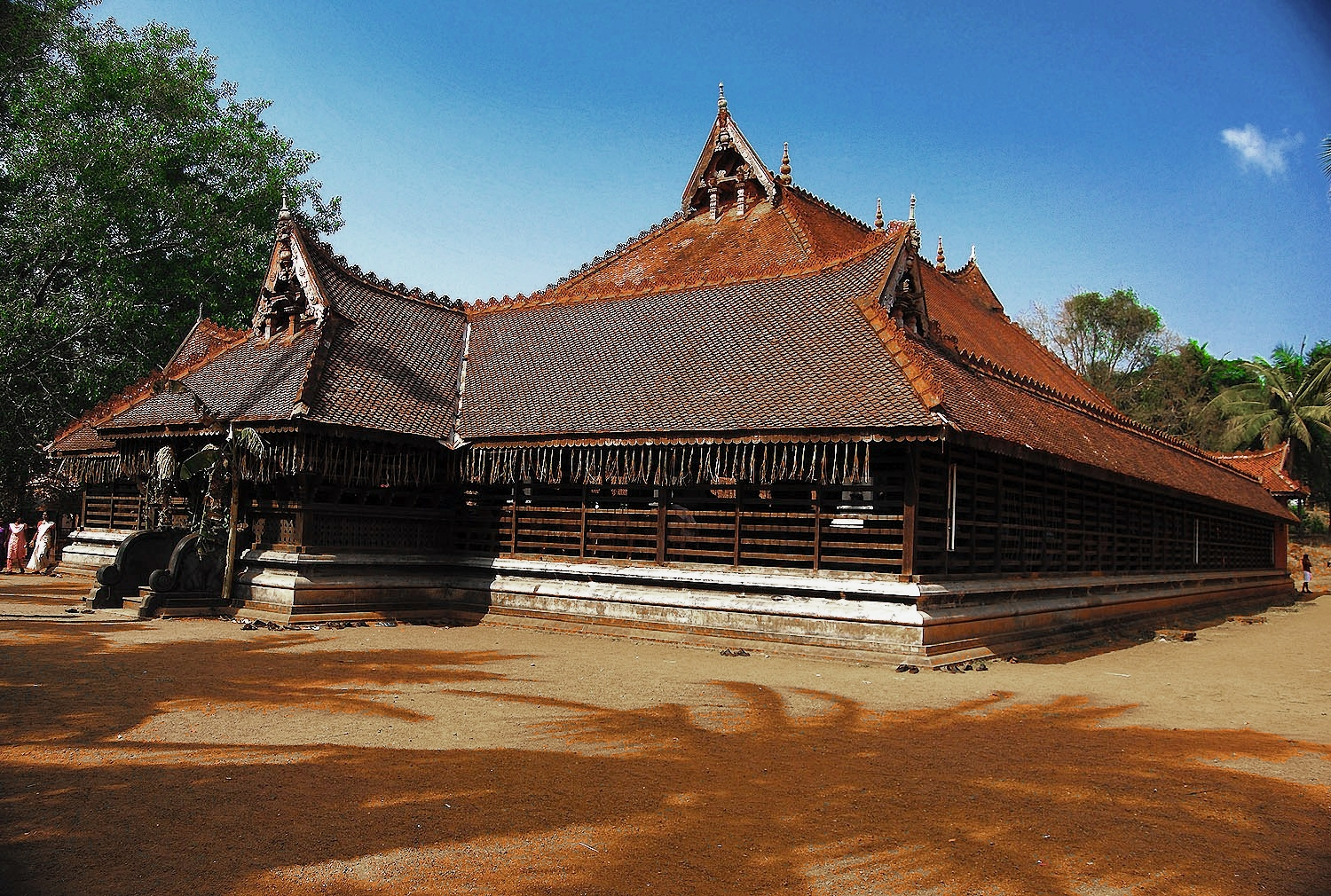
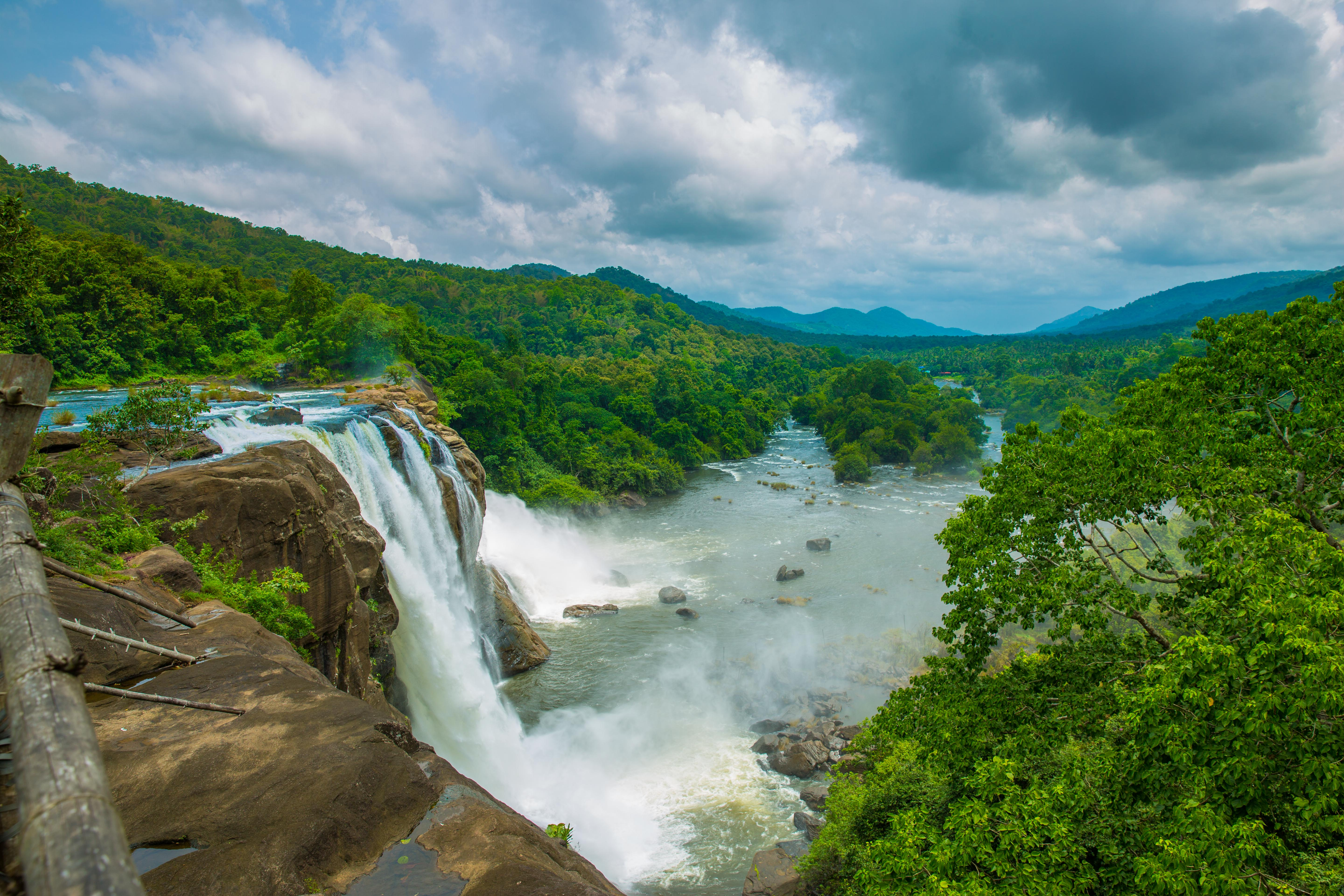
- Clockwise from top: Cheraman Juma Mosque, Cape of Kodungallur, Kerala Kalamandalam, Athirappilly Falls, Shakthan Thampuran Palace, Chimmini Wildlife Sanctuary
- Nickname: Cultural capital of Kerala
- Location in Kerala
- Thrissur District
- Coordinates: 10.52°N 76.21°E
- Country: India
- State: Kerala
- Headquarters: Thrissur
- Subdivisions: Revenue Divisions: 2: Thrissur; Chalakudy; Taluks: 6: Thrissur; Chalakudy; Mukundapuram; Kodungallur; Chavakkad; Kunnamkulam

Government
  - District Collector: Arjun Pandian IAS
  - Commissioner of Police: Nakul Rajendra Deshmukh, IPS
  - Superintendent of Police (Rural): B. Krishna Kumar, IPS
  - Divisional Forest Officer, Thrissur: Kurra Srinivas IFS

Area
  - Total: 3,032 km^{2} (1,171 sq mi)
  - Rank: 4th

Population (2018)
  - Total: 3,243,170
  - Density: 1,070/km^{2} (2,800/sq mi)

Languages
  - Official: Malayalam, English
- Time zone: UTC+5:30 (IST)
- Vehicle registration: KL-08 Thrissur, KL-45 Irinjalakuda, KL-46 Guruvayur, KL-47 Kodungallur, KL-48 Wadakkancherry, KL-64 Chalakkudy, KL-75 Thriprayar
- HDI (2005): ▲0.781 ( High)
- Website: thrissur.nic.in

Thrissur district (Malayalam: [t̪riʃ(ː)uːr]), anglicised as Trichur, is one of the 14 districts in the Indian state of Kerala. It is situated in the central region of the state. Spanning an area of about 3,032 km^{2} (1,171 sq mi), the district is home to over 9% of Kerala's population.

Thrissur district is bordered by the districts of Palakkad and Malappuram to the north, the district of Ernakulam to the south, and Coimbatore to the east. The Arabian Sea lies to the west and the Western Ghats towards the east. It is part of the historical Malabar Coast. The main language spoken is Malayalam.

Thrissur district was formed on 1 July 1949, with the headquarters at Thrissur city. The district is known for its ancient temples, churches, and mosques.

== History ==
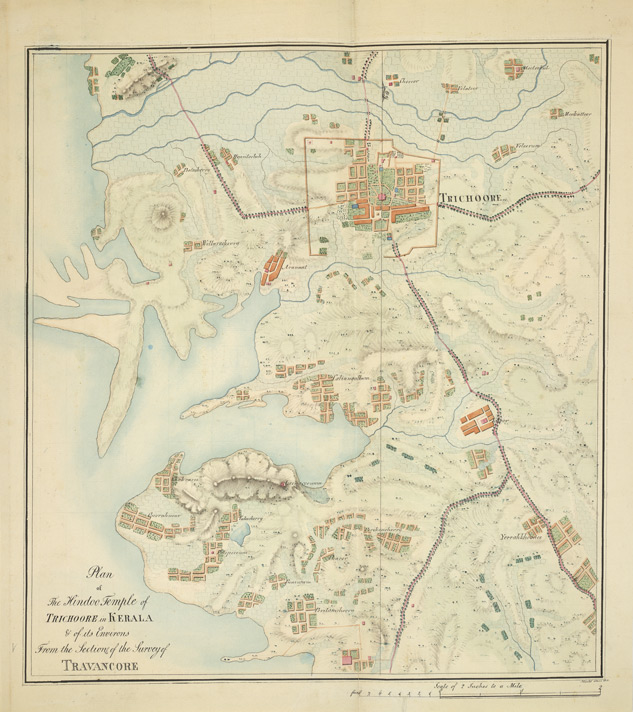
Map of Thrissur City by John Gould, 1816.

The Thrissur district was ruled by the Perumal dynasty from the 9th to the 12th centuries, and following that was part of the Kingdom of Cochin.

== Demographics ==
Historical population
Year	Pop.	±% p.a.
1901	683,266	—
1911	769,702	+1.20%
1921	813,758	+0.56%
1931	993,913	+2.02%
1941	1,154,598	+1.51%
1951	1,403,150	+1.97%
1961	1,688,333	+1.87%
1971	2,128,877	+2.35%
1981	2,439,633	+1.37%
1991	2,737,311	+1.16%
2001	2,974,232	+0.83%
2011	3,121,200	+0.48%
2018	3,243,170	+0.55%

Source: Official Statistics 2007

District	Thrissur
Area	3,027
Population (2011)	31,21,200
Males	14,80,763
Females	16,40,437
Sex ratio : Females/1000	1107
Density of Population	1031
Per Capita Income (in Rs)	21,362
Literacy rate	95.08%; Male 96.78%; Female 93.56%
Coastal line in km.	54
Water bodied area in ha.	5,573
Forest area in ha.	103619

According to the 2018 Statistics Report, Thrissur district has a population of 3,243,170, roughly equal to the nation of Mongolia or the US state of Iowa. The 2011 Census of India gives it a ranking of 113th in India (out of a total of 640). The district has a population density of 1,026 inhabitants per square kilometre (2,660/sq mi). Its population growth rate over the decade 2001–2011 was 4.58%. Thrissur has a sex ratio of 1107 females for every 1000 males, and a literacy rate of 95.32%. 67.17% of the population lives in urban areas. Scheduled Castes and Scheduled Tribes make up 10.39% and 0.30% of the population, respectively. Thrissur was also the second-highest urbanized district in Kerala after Ernakulam.

Malayalam is the predominant language, spoken by 98.91% of the population as of 2011.

=== Religion ===
Religions in Thrissur district (2011)
Religion	Percent
Hinduism	58.42%
Christianity	24.27%
Islam	17.07%
Other or not stated	0.24%

Religions in taluks
Talukas	Hindus	Christians	Muslims	Others
Thrissur	61.25	33.53	4.86	0.36
Kodungallur	59.22	8.43	32.16	0.19
Mukundapuram	56.65	35.56	7.63	0.16
Talappilly	61.13	16.11	22.54	0.23
Chavakkad	52.13	8.60	39.07	0.20

Hinduism is the majority religion in Thrissur, with 58.4% of the population. Christians and Muslims form significant minority.

==== Christians ====
According to Saint Thomas christian tradition, the Palayur church was established in 52 AD by Saint Thomas, one of the twelve apostles of Jesus Christ. It is the first church in India, and Saint Thomas performed the first baptism in India here. It is part of the Ēḻarappaḷḷikaḷ (seven major churches) that he established in India. The original small church structure has been retained at the original site.

== Geography and climate ==
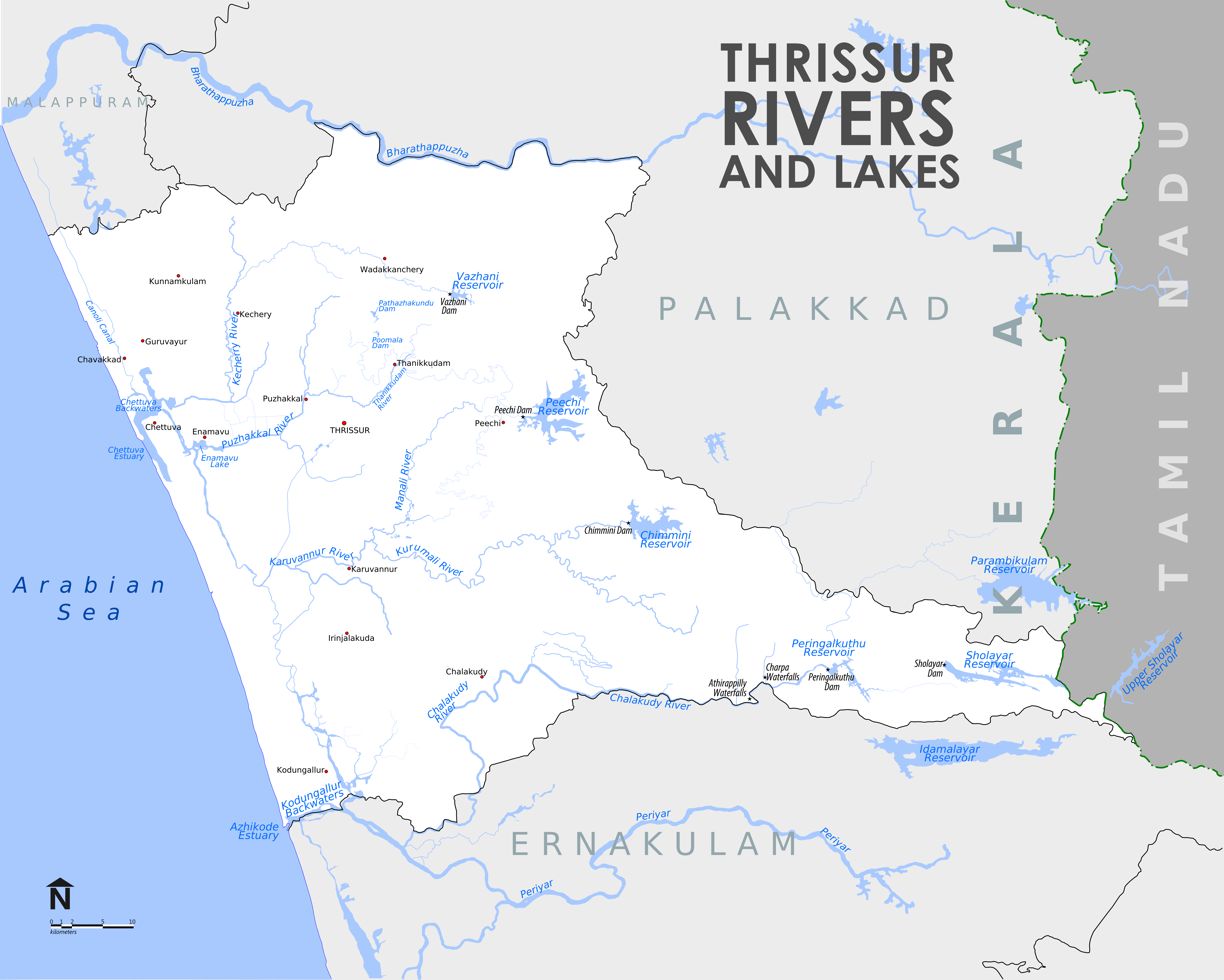
Rivers and Lakes in Thrissur District

Thrissur is situated in southwestern India (10.52°N 76.21°E) and is in the central part of Kerala. Thrissur is at sea level and spans an area of about 3,032 km^{2} (1,171 sq mi). It is bounded on the north by small parts of Malappuram district, on the east and north by Palakkad district, on the east by small parts of Coimbatore district of Tamil Nadu, on the south by Ernakulam district, and on the west by the Arabian Sea (54 km (34 mi)). Descending from the heights of the Western Ghats in the east, the land slopes towards the west forming three distinct natural divisions – the highlands, the plains, and the seaboard. Karimala Gopuram is the highest point in Thrissur, situated in the border of Parambikulam Wildlife Sanctuary of Palakkad.

The Periyar, the Chalakudy, the Karuvannur, the Kurumali River (main tributary of the Karuvannur River), and the Ponnani (Bharatha Puzha) are the main river systems in the district. They take their origin from the mountains on the east, and flow westward and discharge into the Arabian Sea. There are a number of tributaries also joining these main rivers. There are waterfalls such as Athirappilly Falls which is widely known as the "Indian Niagara" nowadays. This is the only district in Kerala with the presence of both Periyar and Bharathappuzha, though they flow only a small distance through the district.

The district has a tropical humid climate with an oppressive hot season and plentiful and seasonal rainfall. Annual rainfall is about 3,000 mm (120 in). The hot season from March to May is followed by the Southwest Monsoon season from June to September. The period from December to February is the Northeast Monsoon season. However, the rain stops by the end of December, and the rest of the period is generally dry.

== Culture ==
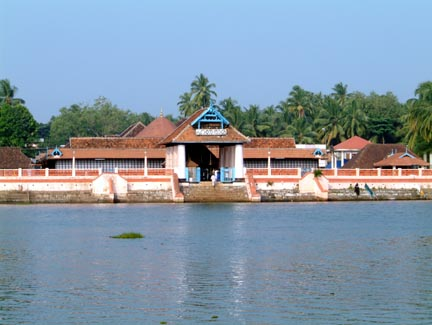
Thriprayar Shree Ramaswami Temple at Triprayar

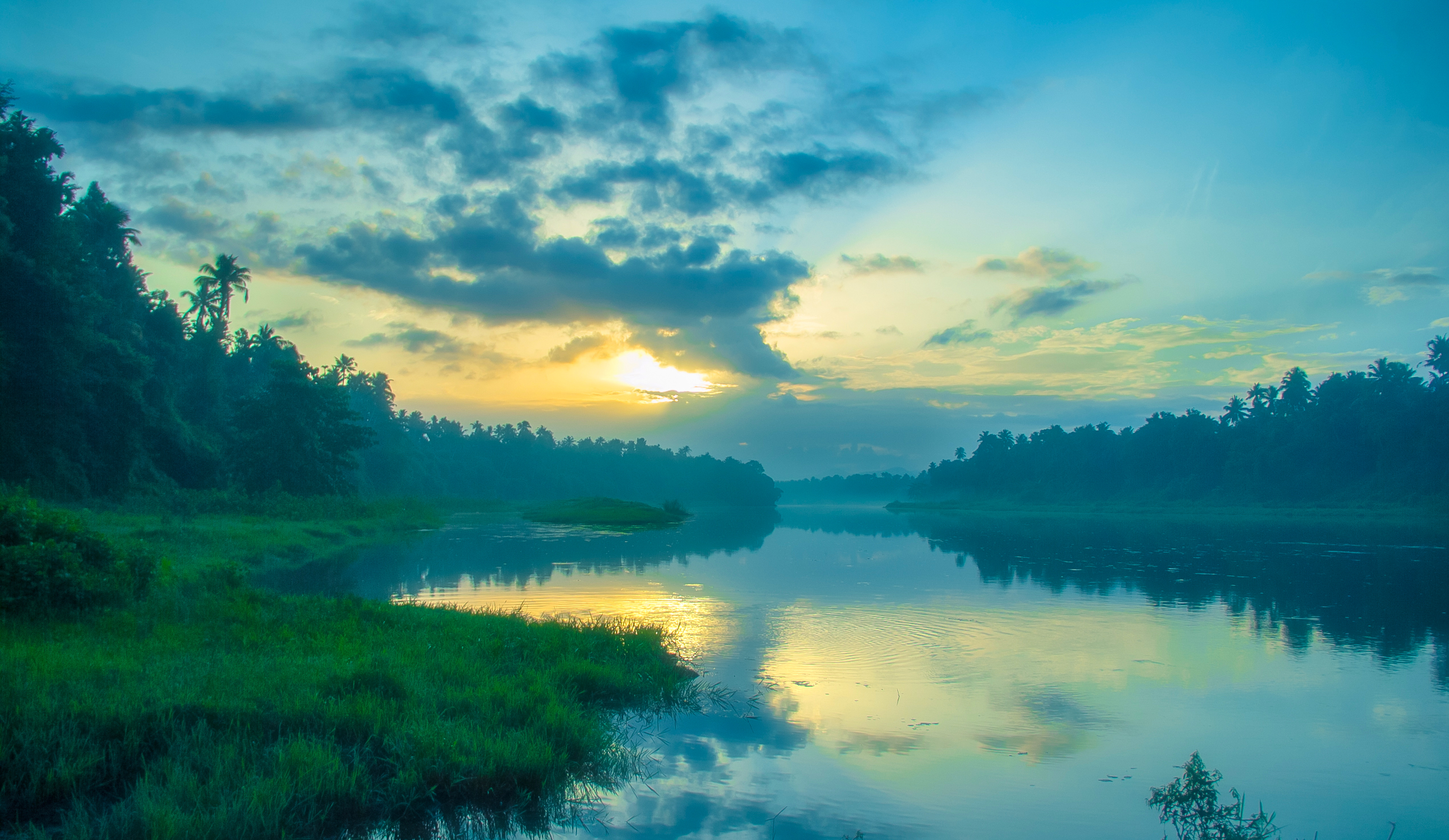
Chalakudy River

- Thrissur Pooram.
- Kerala Kalamandalam
- Kerala Sahitya Academy
- Kerala Lalitakala Academy
- Kerala Sangeeta Nataka Academy.
- Vadakkumnathan (Siva) temple.
- Our Lady of Dolours Basilica
- St. Thomas Syro-Malabar Church, Palayoor.

According to legend, Malik Bin Deenar and 20 others who were the followers of Muhammad, the founder of Islam, first landed in Kodungallur in Thrissur district when they came to India. He built the mosque Cheraman Juma Masjid which makes it the first mosque in India.

== Administration of Thrissur ==
Thrissur District has four types of administrative hierarchies:

- District, Taluk, and Village administration managed by the state government of Kerala; non-elected posts.
- Panchayath Administrations, which are managed by the elected local bodies (Tier-3)
- Municipal administrations, which are managed by elected municipal councils (single tier - Municipalities and Municipal Corporation)
- Assembly Constituencies for the State Government of Kerala (Tier-2)
- Parliament Constituencies for the Union Government of India (Tier-1)

=== Revenue sub-districts and Taluks ===
Taluks in Thrissur District

Taluks & its Headquarters

Thrissur	Thrissur
Mukundapuram	Irinjalakuda
Kodungallur	Kodungallur
Chavakad	Chavakad
Thalapilly	Wadakkanchery
Chalakudy	Chalakudy
Kunnamkulam	Kunnamkulam

The district is divided into two Revenue Sub Divisions: Thrissur and Irinjalakuda, and is headed by the Revenue Divisional Officer (RDO). The district is divided into seven taluks, headed by the Thasildar. Each of these taluks is further divided into villages headed by a village officer, with a total of 255 villages in the district. The numbers in the brackets denote the number of villages in each taluk.

- Taluks under Thrissur Revenue Division:
  - Thrissur (74)
  - Chavakkad (29)
  - Talappilly (45)
  - Kunnamkulam (29)
- Taluks under Irinjalakuda Revenue Division:
  - Mukundapuram (29)
  - Chalakudy (31)
  - Kodungallur (18)

==== Local Self-Governing Bodies ====
Municipalities

Kunnamkulam
Chalakudy
Kodungallur
Chavakad
Guruvayur
Irinjalakuda
Wadakkanchery

Municipal
Corporation

Thrissur

The district of Kerala has the following Local Self-Governing Bodies (LSGs), which form the third-tier government.

- District Panchayats - 1
- Block Panchayats - 16
- Grama Panchayats - 86
- Municipalities - 7
- Municipal Corporations - 1

Thrissur Municipal Corporation is the only municipal corporation in the district.

==== Kerala State Assembly Constituencies ====
There are 13 constituencies from the district of Thrissur:

- 61 - Chelakkara Assembly Constituency
- 62 - Kunnamkulam Assembly Constituency
- 63 - Guruvayoor Assembly Constituency
- 64 - Manalur Assembly Constituency
- 65 - Wadakkanchery Assembly Constituency
- 66 - Ollur Assembly Constituency
- 67 - Thrissur Assembly Constituency
- 68 - Nattika Assembly Constituency
- 69 - Kaipamangalam Assembly Constituency
- 70 - Irinjalakuda Assembly Constituency
- 71 - Puthukkad Assembly Constituency
- 72 - Chalakudy Assembly Constituency
- 73 - Kodungallur Assembly Constituency

==== Lok Sabha Parliamentary Constituency ====
The district of Thrissur forms part of three parliamentary constituencies:

- Thrissur Lok Sabha constituency
- Chalakudy Lok Sabha constituency; headquartered in Chalakkudy, Thrissur district. (3/7 assembly constituencies in Thrissur district)
- Alathur Lok Sabha constituency; headquartered in Alathur, Palakkad district. (3/7 assembly constituencies in Thrissur district)

Suresh Gopi is the Thrissur MP, Benny Behanan is the Chalakudy MP, and K. Radhakrishnan is the Alathur MP.

== Major towns ==
- Thalappilly taluk: Wadakkancherry, Chelakkara, Thruvilwamala, Pazhayannur, Cheruthuruthi, Mayannur
- Kunnamkulam taluk: Kunnamkulam, Kechery, Perumpilavu, Pazhanji
- Chavakad taluk: Chavakad, Guruvayoor, Vadanappilly, Triprayar
- Thrissur taluk: Cherpu, Kanjany,Athani, Pattikkad
- Kodungallur taluk: Kodungalloor, Perinjanam, Moonupeedika
- Mukundapuram taluk: Irinjalakuda, Puthukkad, Mala
- Chalakudy taluk: Chalakudy, Muringoor, Meloor, Kodakara, Koratty

== Media ==
General began publication in 1976.

=== Politics ===
District	No.	Constituency	Name	Party	Alliance	Remarks
Thrissur	61	Chelakkara (SC)	U. R. Pradeep	CPI(M)	LDF	
Thrissur	62	Kunnamkulam	A. C. Moideen	CPI(M)	LDF	
Thrissur	63	Guruvayur	N. K. Akbar	CPI(M)	LDF	
Thrissur	64	Manalur	C. Raveendranath	CPI(M)	LDF	
Thrissur	65	Wadakkanchery	Xavier Chittilappilly	CPI(M)	LDF	
Thrissur	66	Ollur	K. Rajan	CPI	LDF	
Thrissur	67	Thrissur	Rajan Pallan	INC	UDF	
Thrissur	68	Nattika (SC)	Geetha Gopi	CPI	LDF	
Thrissur	69	Kaipamangalam	K. K. Valsaraj	CPI	LDF	
Thrissur	70	Irinjalakuda	Thomas Unniyadan	KC	UDF	
Thrissur	71	Puthukkad	K. K. Ramachandran	CPI(M)	LDF	
Thrissur	72	Chalakudy	T. J. Saneesh Kumar Joseph	INC	UDF	
Thrissur	73	Kodungallur	O. J. Janeesh	INC	UDF	Minister of Youth Affairs, Sports, Registration & Museum

== Places of interest ==
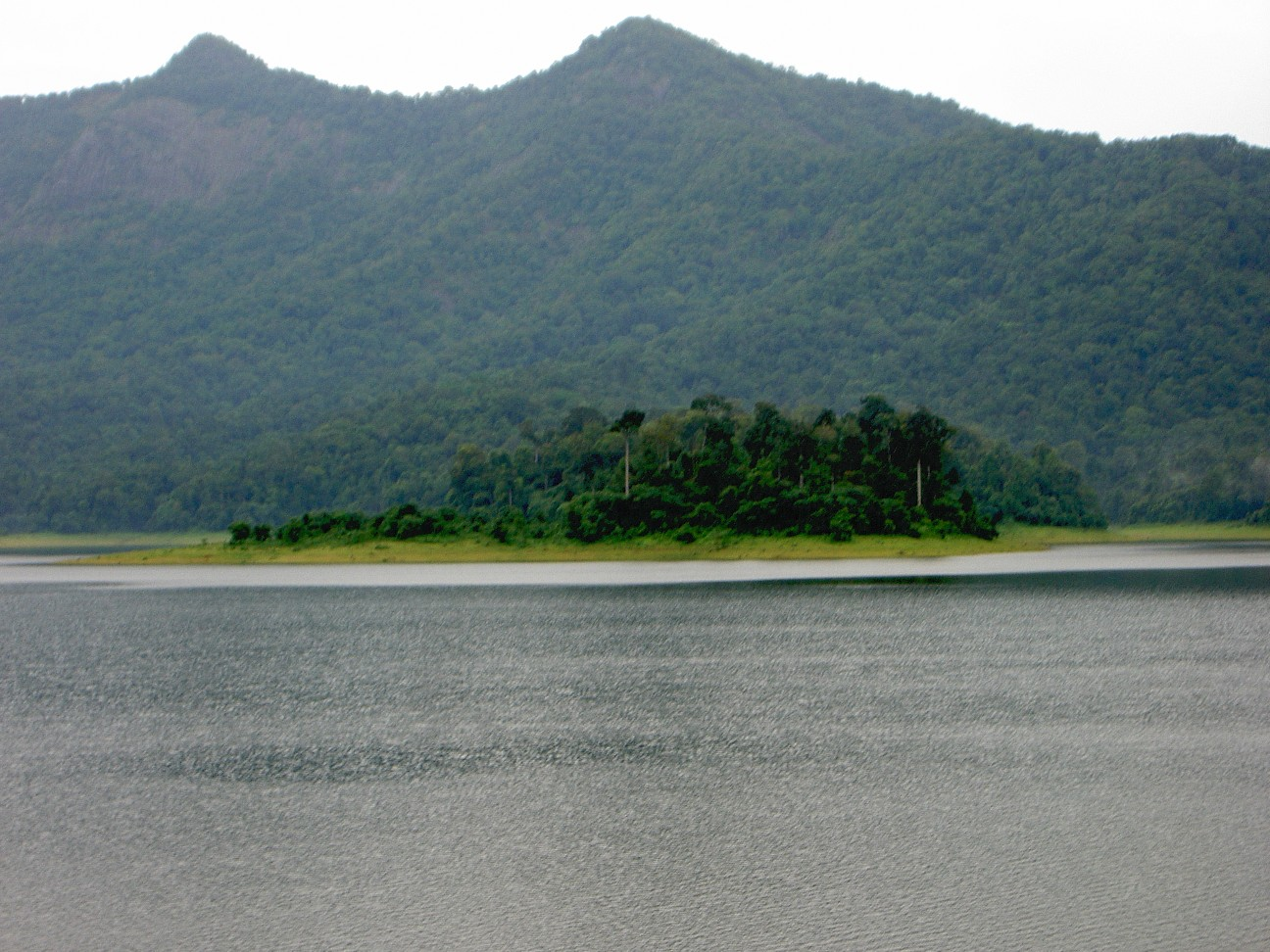
Chimmony Wildlife Sanctuary – 30 km (19 mi) from Thrissur City.

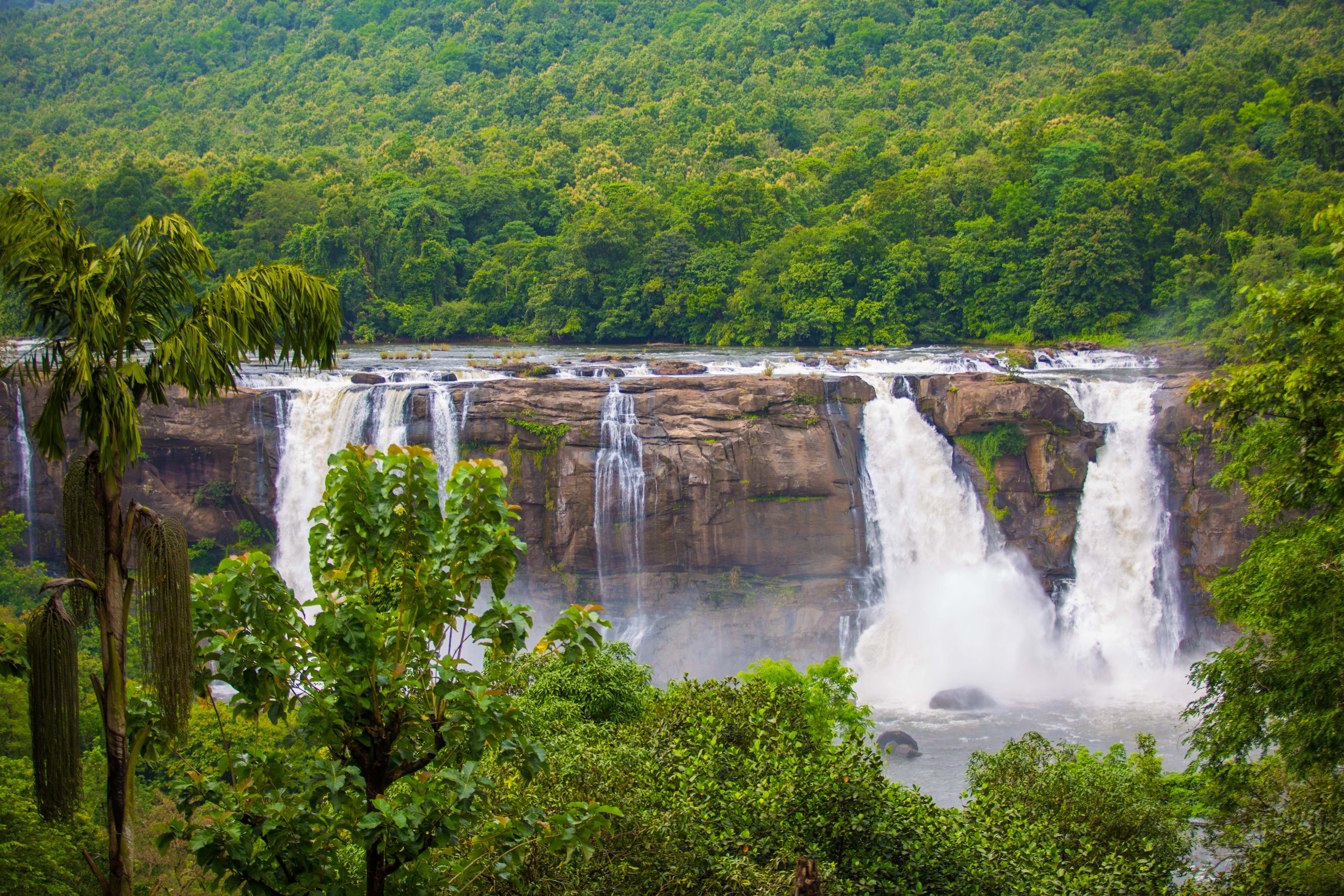
The Athirapally Falls flowing its usual discharge

- Athirapilly Water Falls (63 km (39 mi) from Thrissur City): This 80 feet high waterfall at the threshold of the Sholayar ranges is a picnic spot. Two amusement parks – DreamWorld and SilverStorm – are located nearby.
- Vazhachal : Just a short drive from Athirapilly is close to dense forests and a part of the Chalakudy river.
- Chalakudy River : This Perennial River is the 5th Longest river in Kerala and the richest river in fish diversity, perhaps in India.
- Punnathur Kotta Elephant Sanctuary (23 km (14 mi) from city): It is the largest elephant park in the world, with over 60 elephants.
- Peechi Dam: (20 km (12 mi) from city) It is a good picnic spot. The dam was started as an irrigation project for the surrounding villages in Thrissur. At the same time, it catered the drinking water needs of the population of Thrissur City. It serves as an irrigation dam, reaching out to the paddy fields in and around Thrissur city. Built across the Manali River. Elephants may be seen on the bank of Peechi-Vazhani Wildlife Sanctuary, established in 1958 covering 125 square kilometres (48 sq mi).
- Poomala Dam: A natural reserve and tourist spot with an irrigation dam.
- Chavakkad Beach
- Vazhani Dam (24 km (15 mi) from city): It is a good picnic spot built over Kechery River .
- Snehatheeram Beach: This beach is around 23 km (14 mi) from town of Thrissur near by Nattika village.
- Chimmony dam (35 km (22 mi) from city)
- Kerala Kalamandalam (30 km (19 mi)): It is in Cheruthuruthy and was founded by the Poet Sri. Vallathol Narayana Menon, to encourage the study of the ancient arts of Kerala such as Kathakali and Mohiniyattom.
- Koodalmanikyam Temple
- Thrissur Zoo & Museum (2 km [1.2 mi]): Opened in 1885, it is a 13.5-acre (5.5 ha) big zoo. The zoo is home for various animals, reptiles and birds.

== Important towns ==
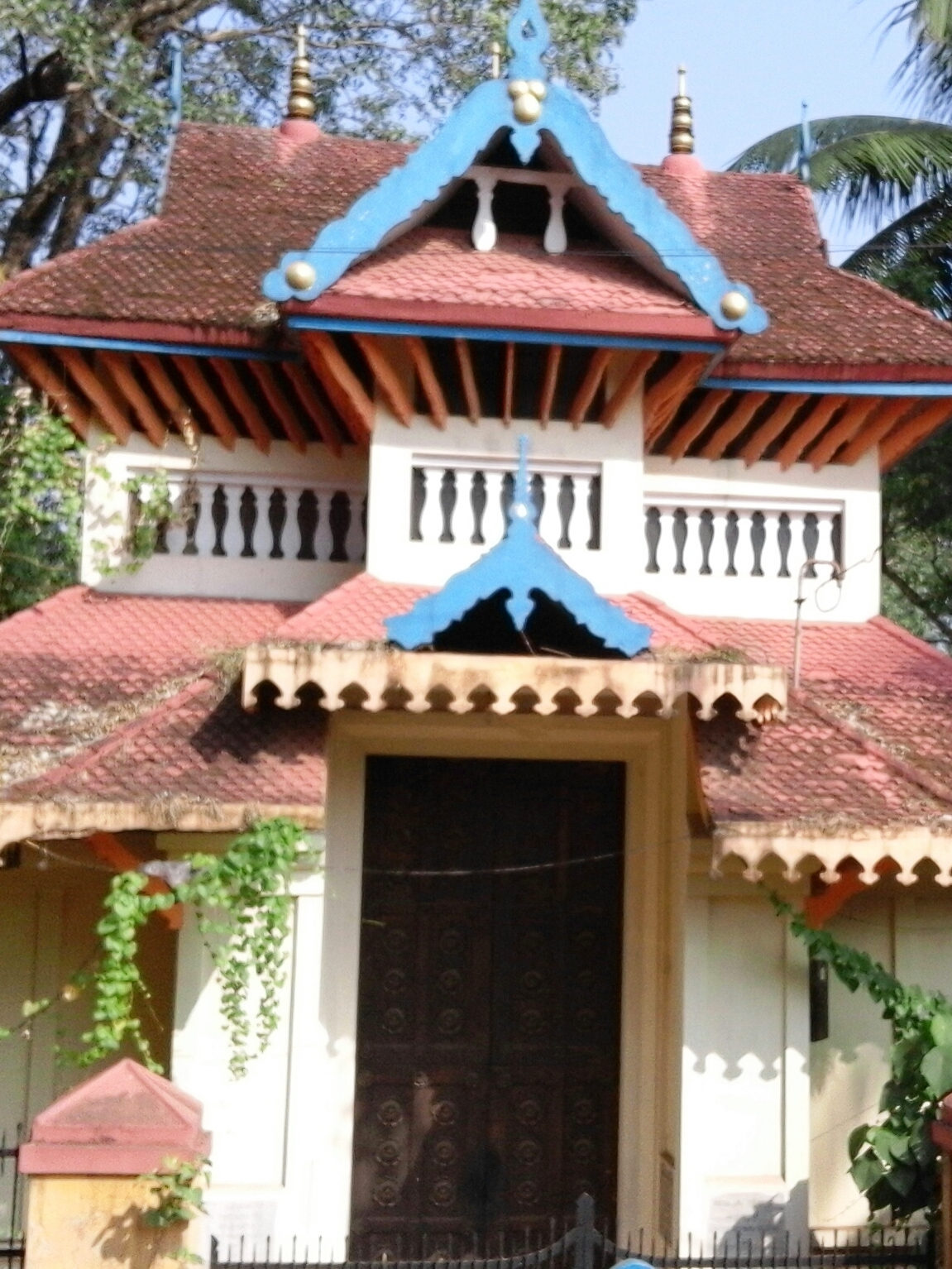
Kulassery Narasimha Temple, Thrissur

- Chalakudy
- Chavakkad
- Chelakkara
- Guruvayur
- Irinjalakuda
- Kodungallur
- Kunnamkulam
- Pazhayannur
- Triprayar
- Mala
- Vadanappally
- Wadakanchery

== Gallery ==
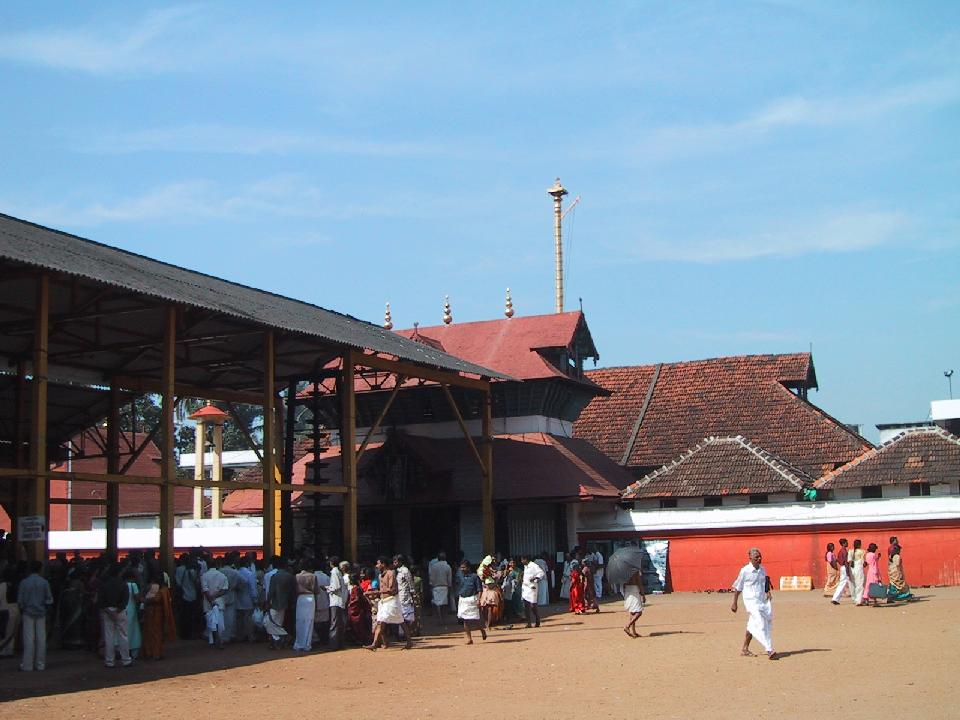
Guruvayur Temple entrance – 25 km from Thrissur City.

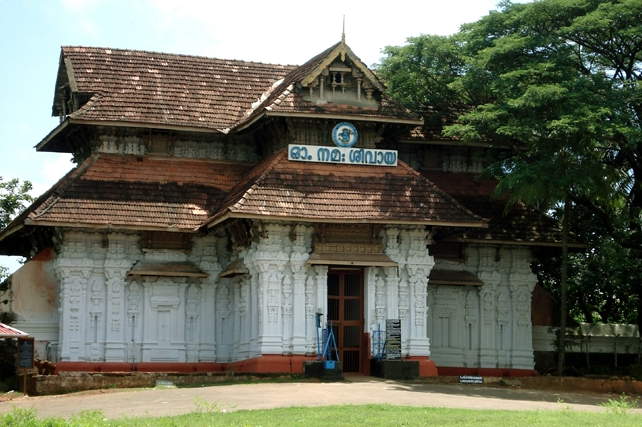
East Gate of Vadakumnathan Temple.

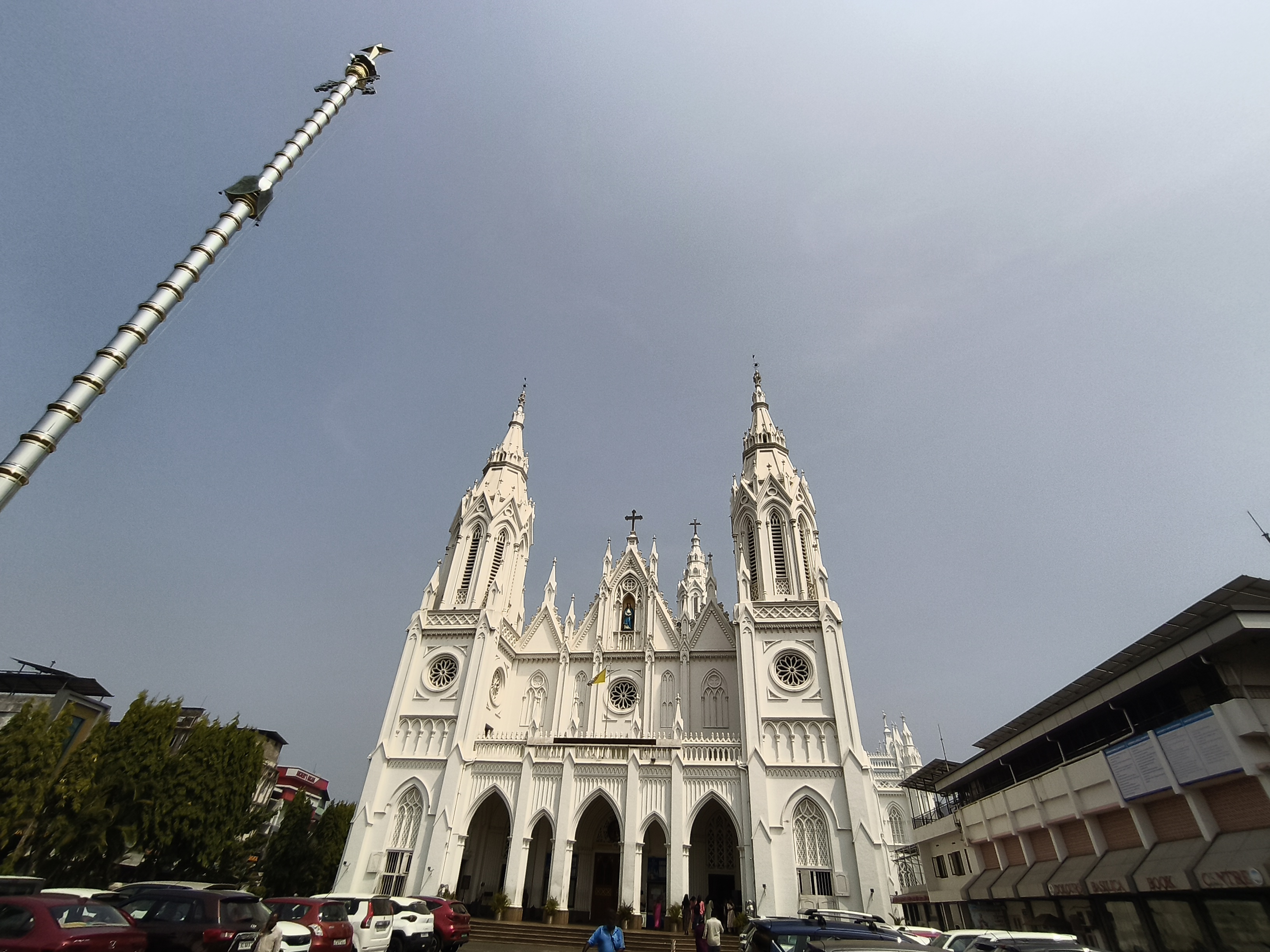
Basilica of Our Lady of Dolours, Thrissur

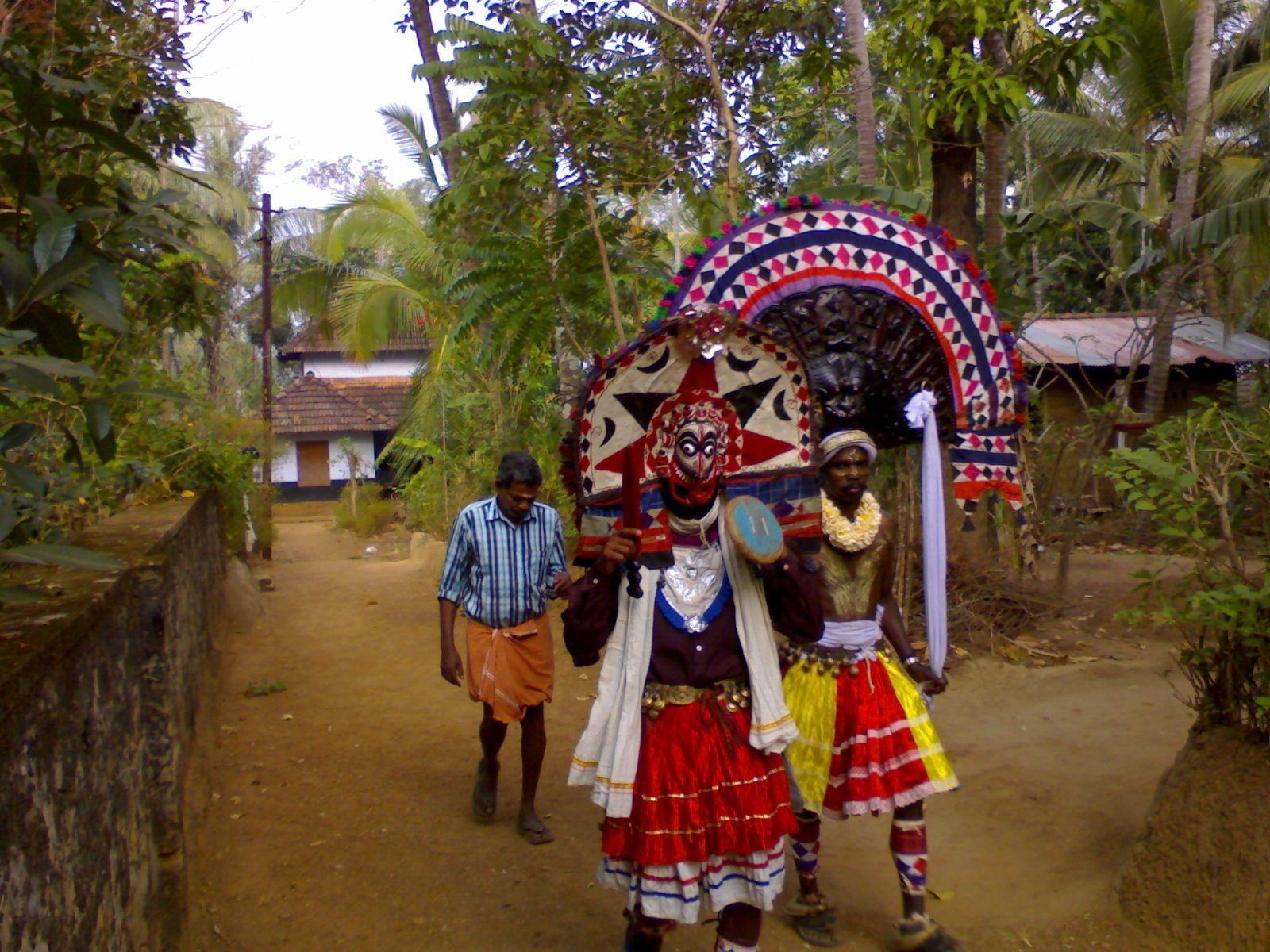
Poothan and Thira for the Machattu Vela festival, near Wadakkanchery.

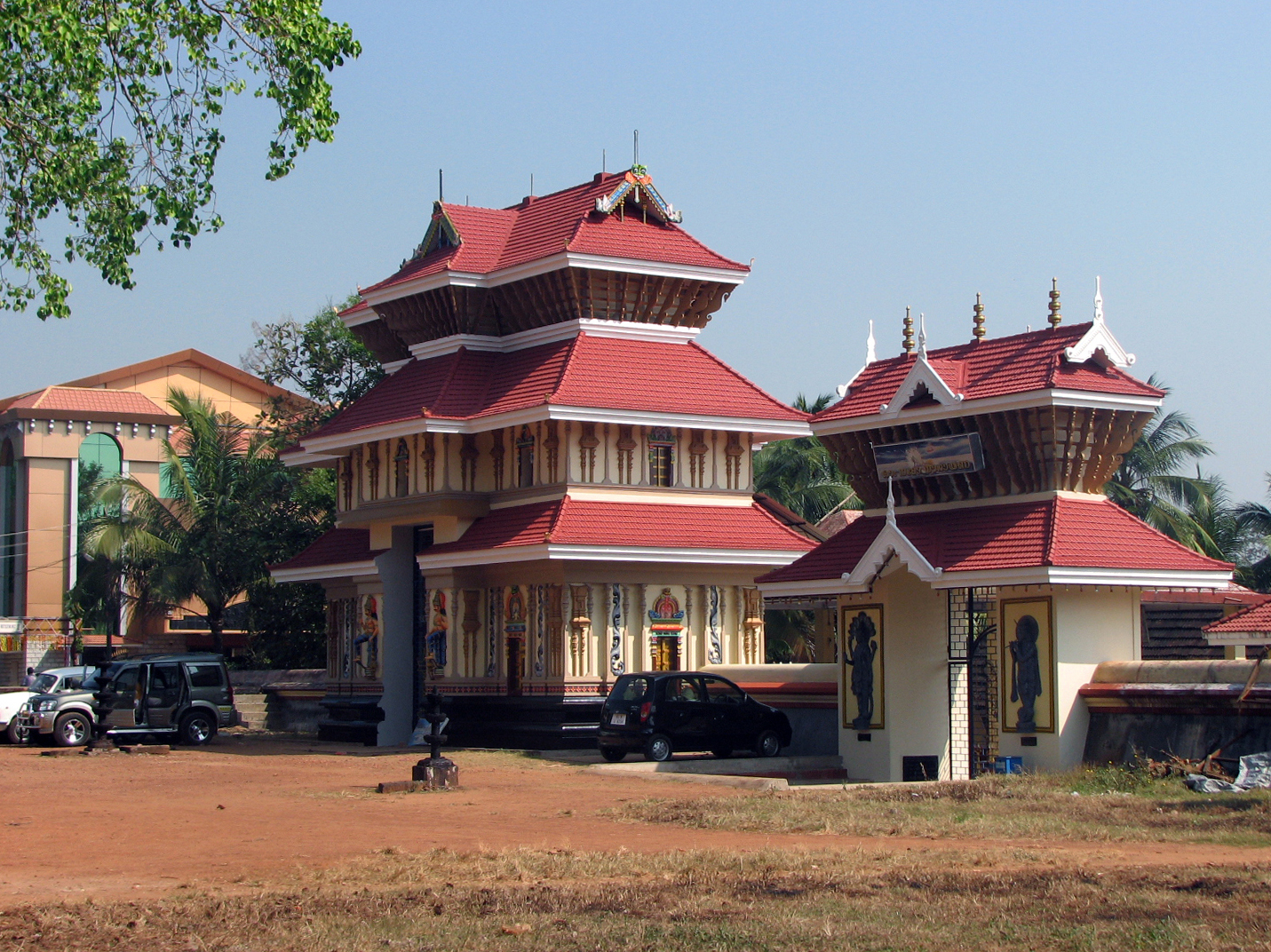
Muthuvara Shiva Temple.
