= List of Monuments of National Importance in Kerala =

This is a list of Monuments of National Importance (ASI) as officially recognized by and available through the website of the Archaeological Survey of India in the Indian state Kerala. The monument identifier is a combination of the abbreviation of the subdivision of the list (state, ASI circle) and the numbering as published on the website of the ASI. 26 Monuments of National Importance have been recognized by the ASI in Kerala.

== List of monuments of national importance ==
SL. No.	Description	Location	Address	District	Coordinates	Image
N-KL-1	Mattancherry Palace	Cochin	Mattancherry, Kochi, Kerala 682002, India	Ernakulam	9°57′30″N 76°15′34″E	Mattancherry Palace More images
N-KL-2	St. Francis Church	Cochin	Fort Kochi, Kochi, Kerala, India	Ernakulam	9°57′57″N 76°14′28″E	St. Francis Church More images
N-KL-3	St. Angelo Fort	Kannur	Burnacherry, Kannur, Kerala, India	Kannur	11°51′15″N 75°22′17″E	St. Angelo Fort More images
N-KL-4	Tellicherry Fort	Thalassery	Palissery, Thalassery, Kerala 670104, India	Kannur	11°44′53″N 75°29′12″E	Tellicherry Fort More images
N-KL-5	Bekal Fort	Pallikere	Bekal, Kerala, 671316, India	Kasargod	12°23′33″N 75°01′59″E	Bekal Fort More images
N-KL-6	Palakkad Fort	Palakkad	Kenathuparambu, Kunathurmedu, Palakkad, Kerala 678013, India	Palakkad	10°45′49″N 76°39′24″E	Palakkad Fort More images
N-KL-7	Kaithali Shiva temple	Pattambi		Palghat	10°48′27″N 76°11′23″E	Kaithali Shiva temple More images
N-KL-8	St. Thomas Fort	Thangassery		Kollam	8°52′54″N 76°34′06″E	St. Thomas Fort More images
N-KL-9	Fort	Anjengo		Thiruvananthapuram	8°39′46″N 76°45′52″E	Fort More images
N-KL-10	Temples of Parasurama, Brahma, Siva and Matsya together with adjacent land	Thiruvallam		Thiruvananthapuram	8°26′30″N 76°57′18″E	Temples of Parasurama, Brahma, Siva and Matsya together with adjacent land More images
N-KL-11	Vizhinjam rock caves	Vizhinjam		Thiruvananthapuram	8°22′57″N 76°59′29″E	Vizhinjam rock caves More images
N-KL-12	Chemmanthatta Mahadeva Temple	Eyyal (Chemmanthatta)		Thrissur	10°39′00″N 76°06′54″E	Chemmanthatta Mahadeva Temple More images
N-KL-13	29 Wooden Bracket Figures on the outer wall of the Srikoil of the Sree Rama temple and other works of art in the same shrine	Kadavallur		Thrissur	10°42′54″N 76°04′06″E	29 Wooden Bracket Figures on the outer wall of the Srikoil of the Sree Rama temple and other works of art in the same shrine More images
N-KL-14	Peruvanam Mahadeva Temple	Cherpu (Peruvanam)		Thrissur	10°26′15″N 76°12′43″E	Peruvanam Mahadeva Temple More images
N-KL-15	Mural paintings (16th to 17th century) on the walls of the Siva temple	Thiruvanchikulam		Thrissur	10°12′37″N 76°12′23″E	Mural paintings (16th to 17th century) on the walls of the Siva temple More images
N-KL-16	Mural paintings on the walls of Shri Ramaswamy temple	Triprayar		Thrissur	10°24′51″N 76°06′55″E	Mural paintings on the walls of Shri Ramaswamy temple More images
N-KL-17	Siva temple complex, Pallimanna	Vadakkancherry		Thrissur	10°40′22″N 76°13′39″E	Siva temple complex, Pallimanna More images
N-KL-18	Mural paintings (16th to 17th century) on the walls of Kailasanatha temple	Thrissur		Thrissur	10°31′28″N 76°12′52″E	Mural paintings (16th to 17th century) on the walls of Kailasanatha temple More images
N-KL-19	Ariyannur Umbrellas	Ariyanur		Thrissur	10°36′21″N 76°05′07″E	Ariyannur Umbrellas More images
N-KL-20	Kudakkallu Parambu	Cheramangad		Thrissur	10°41′07″N 76°07′18″E	Kudakkallu Parambu More images
N-KL-21	Chovvanur burial cave	Chovvanur		Thrissur	10°39′21″N 76°04′57″E	Chovvanur burial cave More images
N-KL-22	Eyyal burial cave	Eyyal	Samajam Road, Eyyal Adhoor Road, Eyyal, Kerala 680501, India	Thrissur	10°39′27″N 76°07′09″E	Eyyal burial cave More images
N-KL-23	Burial Cave	Kandanasseri		Thrissur	10°35′58″N 76°04′57″E	Burial Cave More images
N-KL-24	Burial Cave	Katakampil		Thrissur	10°41′14″N 76°02′21″E	Burial Cave More images
N-KL-25	Burial Cave of Kakkad	Kunnamkulam		Thrissur	10°39′41″N 76°04′07″E	Burial Cave of Kakkad More images
N-KL-26	Jain temple	Kitanganad		Wynad	11°39′37″N 76°15′02″E	Jain temple More images

== See also ==
- List of Monuments of National Importance in India for other Monuments of National Importance in India
- List of State Protected Monuments in Kerala
