= Ariyannur Umbrellas =

Coordinates: 10.6040°N 76.0813°E

- അരിയന്നൂർ കുടക്കല്ല് (Malayalam)
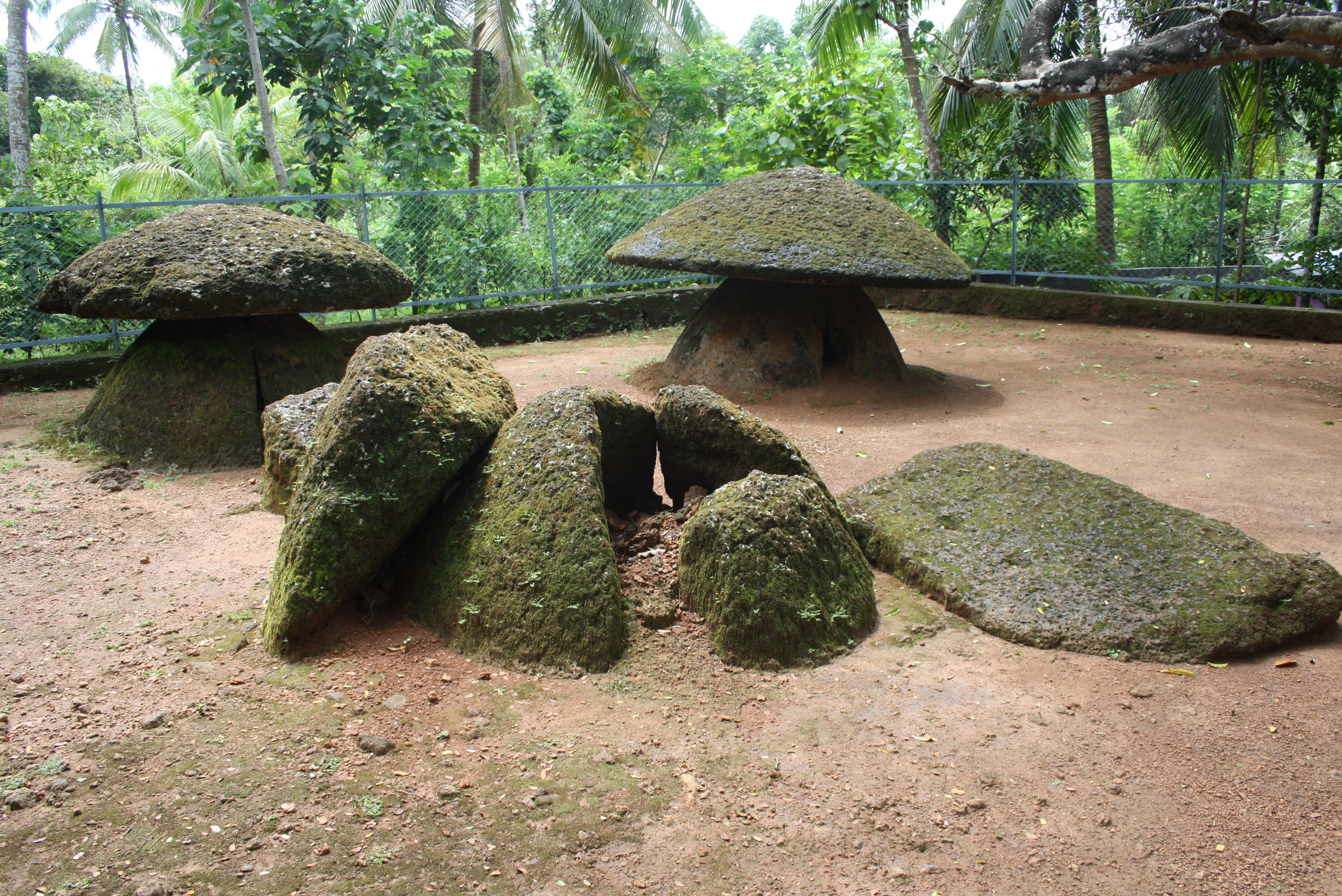
- A view of three umbrella stones

- Location within Kerala
- Location: Thrissur, Kerala

Site notes
- Governing body: Archaeological Survey of India

Ariyannur Umbrellas is a prehistoric Megalith burial site situated in Ariyannur in Kandanassery Panchayat of Thrissur District of Kerala. Archaeological Survey of India in 1951 declared it as a centrally protected monument. The site has six umbrella stones or mushroom stones, locally called Kudaikkallu. Of them, four are intact and two are partially broken. .
These are part of the larger Kudakkallu Parambu complex which is believed to be from ~2000 BCE.

== Gallery ==
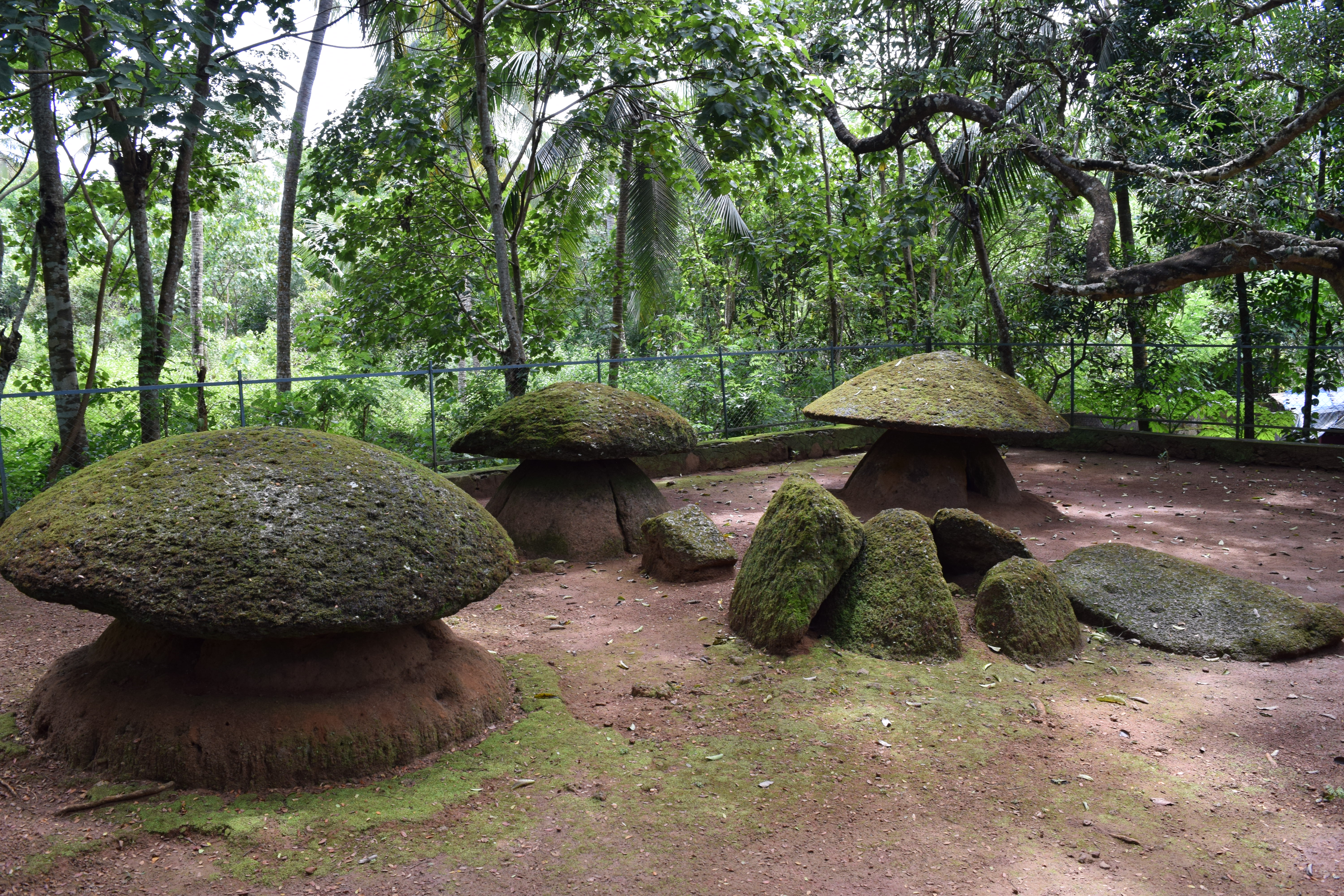
Ariyannur Umbrellas

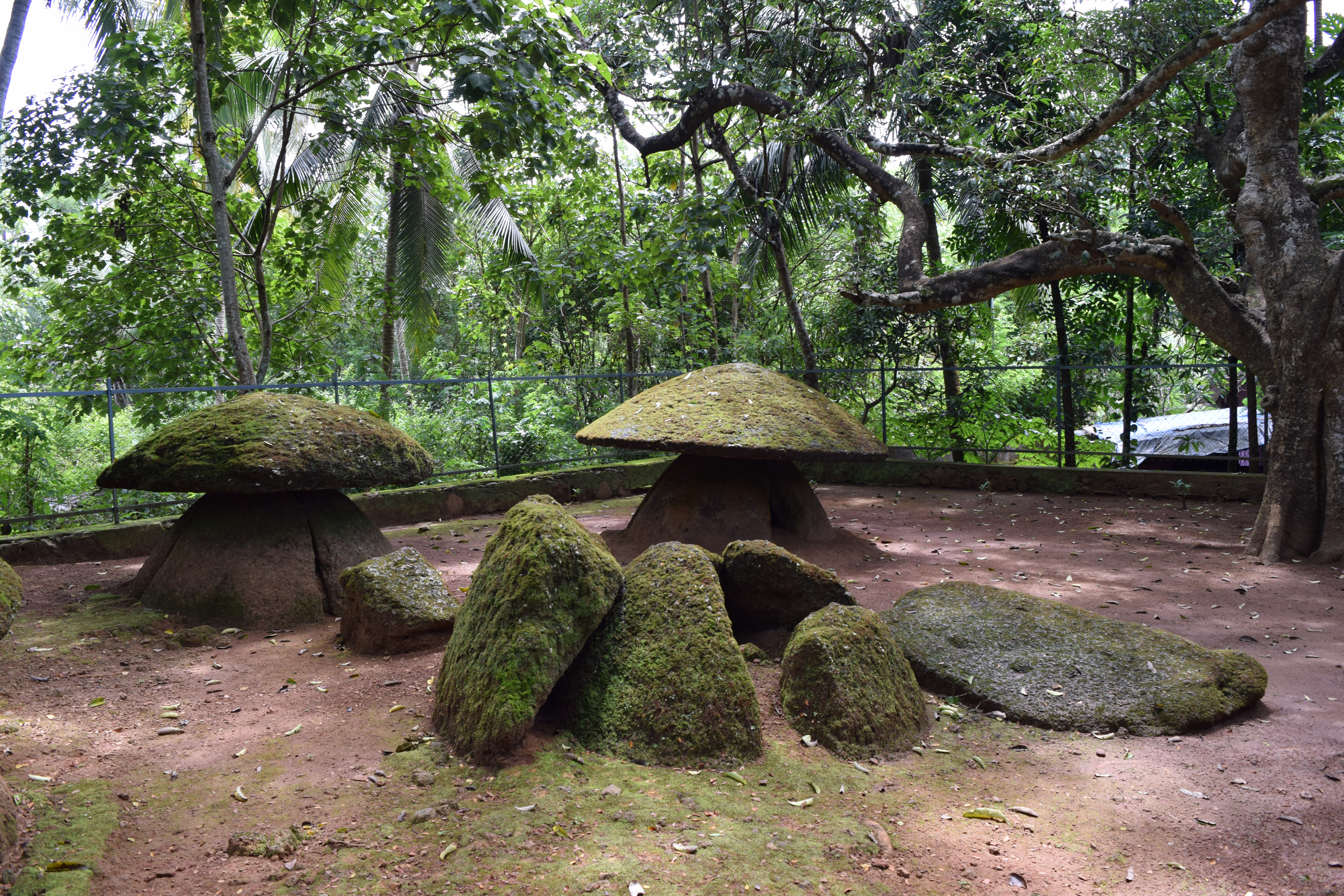
Ariyannur Umbrellas

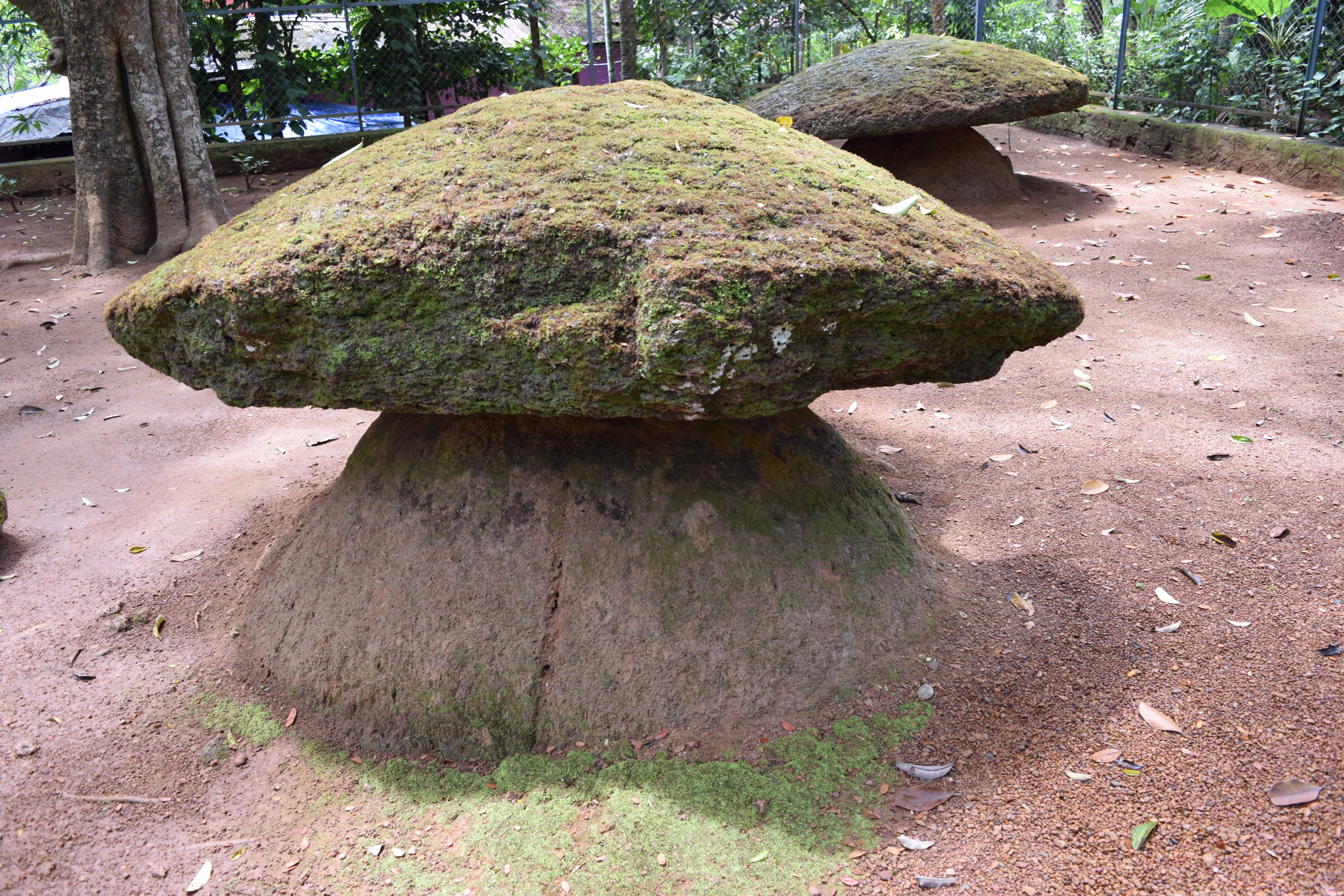
Ariyannur Umbrellas

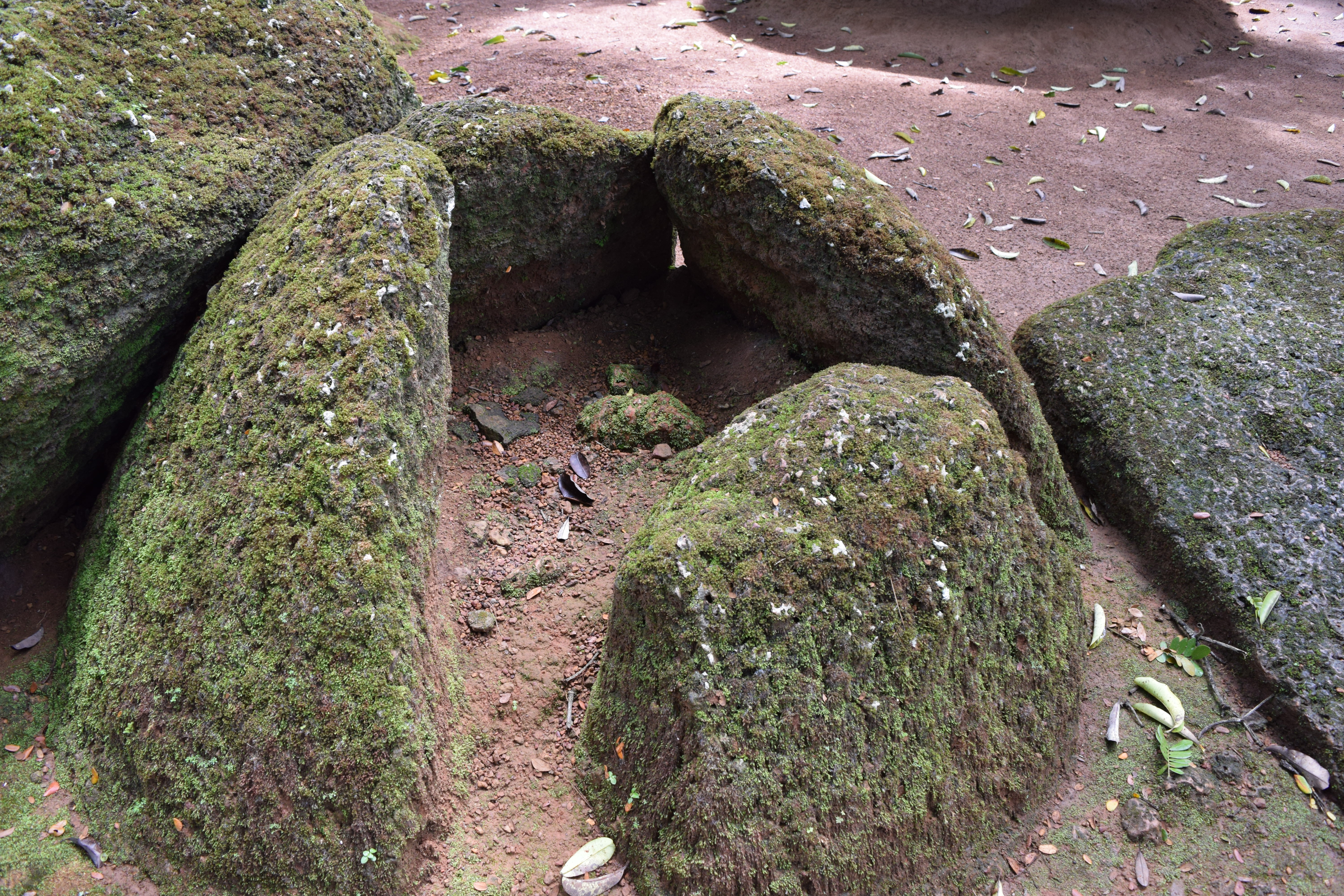
Ariyannur Umbrellas

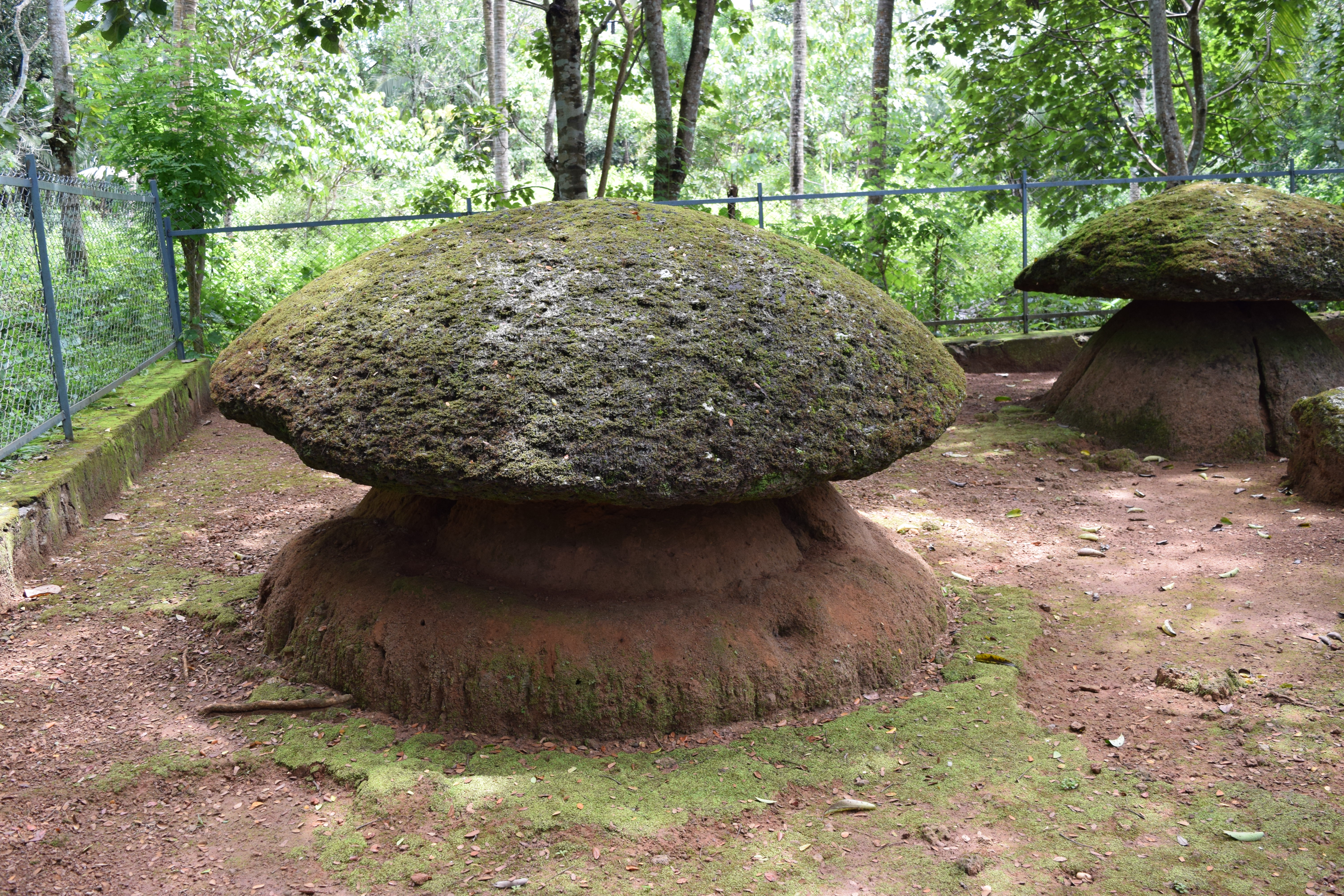
Ariyannur Umbrellas
