= Eyyal burial cave =

Coordinates: 10.657175°N 76.118652°E

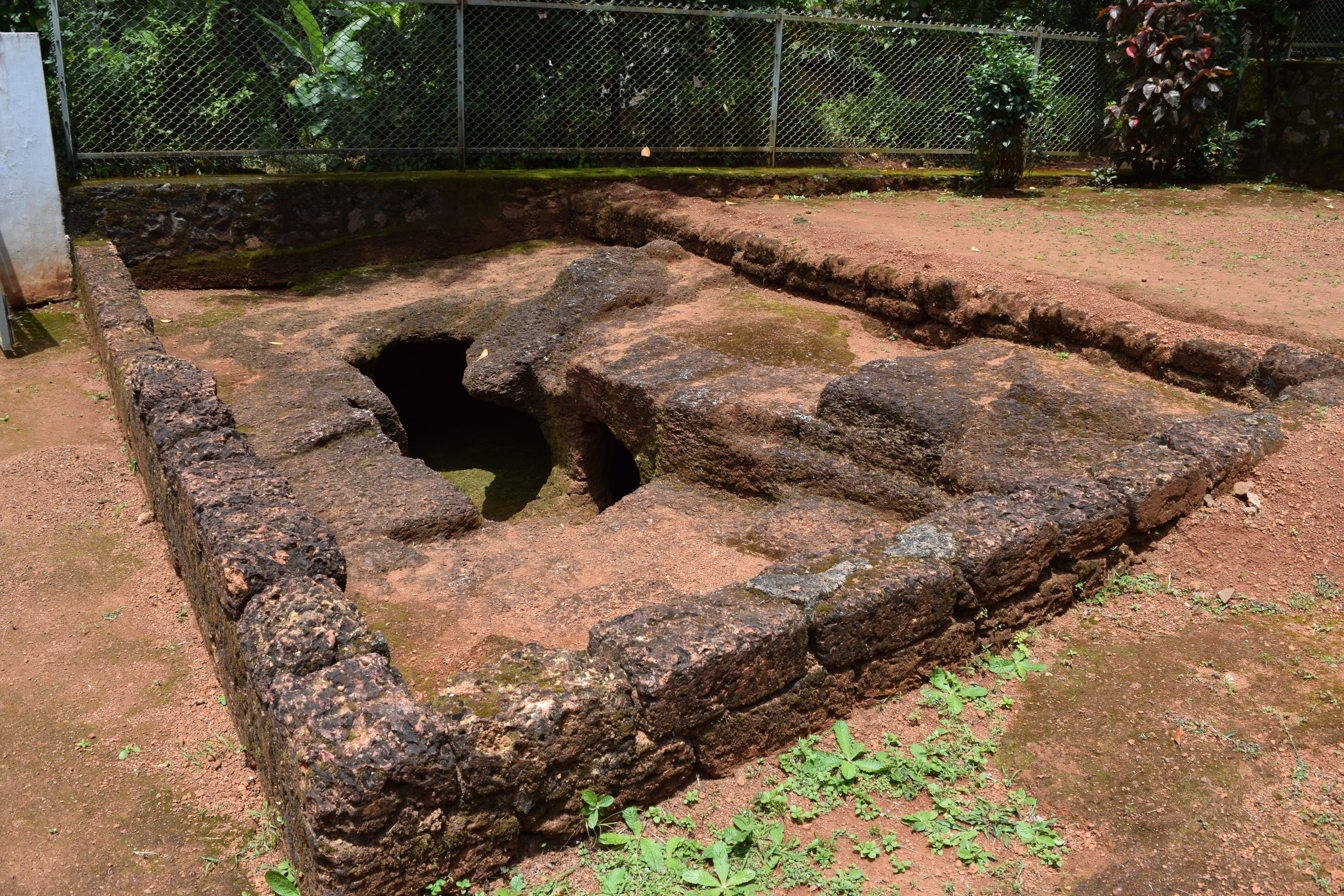
Burial Cave at Eyyal, Thrissur District, kerala

Eyyal Burial Cave is a prehistoric Megalith rock cut cave situated in Eyyal, of Thrissur District of Kerala. The cave can be accessed from single entry and its chamber is circular. Archaeological Survey of India has declared this cave as centrally protected monument.
