= M. P. Ramachandran =

Indian businessman

- Born: Moothedath Panjan Ramachandran; Kandanassery, Thrissur, Kerala, India
- Education: St. Thomas College, Thrissur; University of Mumbai
- Occupations: Founder & Chairman Emeritus of Jyothy Labs
- Years active: 1983–2020

Moothedath Panjan Ramachandran is an Indian businessman from Thrissur, Kerala. He is the Founder and Chairman Emeritus of Jyothy Labs. He has completed his B.Com degree from St. Thomas College, Thrissur.

== Career ==
In 1971, he started working as an accountant while getting a post graduation in financial management in Bombay (now Mumbai). Since his childhood, Ramachandran had washed his own clothes but was dissatisfied with fabric whiteners results. One day he got a chemical industry journal that talked about "purple-colored dyes helping textile makers get the most brilliant shades of white". The phrase ignited an idea. Ramachandran experimented in his kitchen for a year–boiling, diluting and testing–until he was pleased with the results.

In 1983, a brother lent him ₹5,000 (less than US$60) to set up a makeshift factory on family land in Kerala. He named his firm Jyothy after his first daughter. In the first year, sales totaled ₹40,000 (US$500 today) and profits were US$18.
