= Chemmanthatta Mahadeva Temple =

- ചെമ്മന്തിട്ട മഹാദേവക്ഷേത്രം
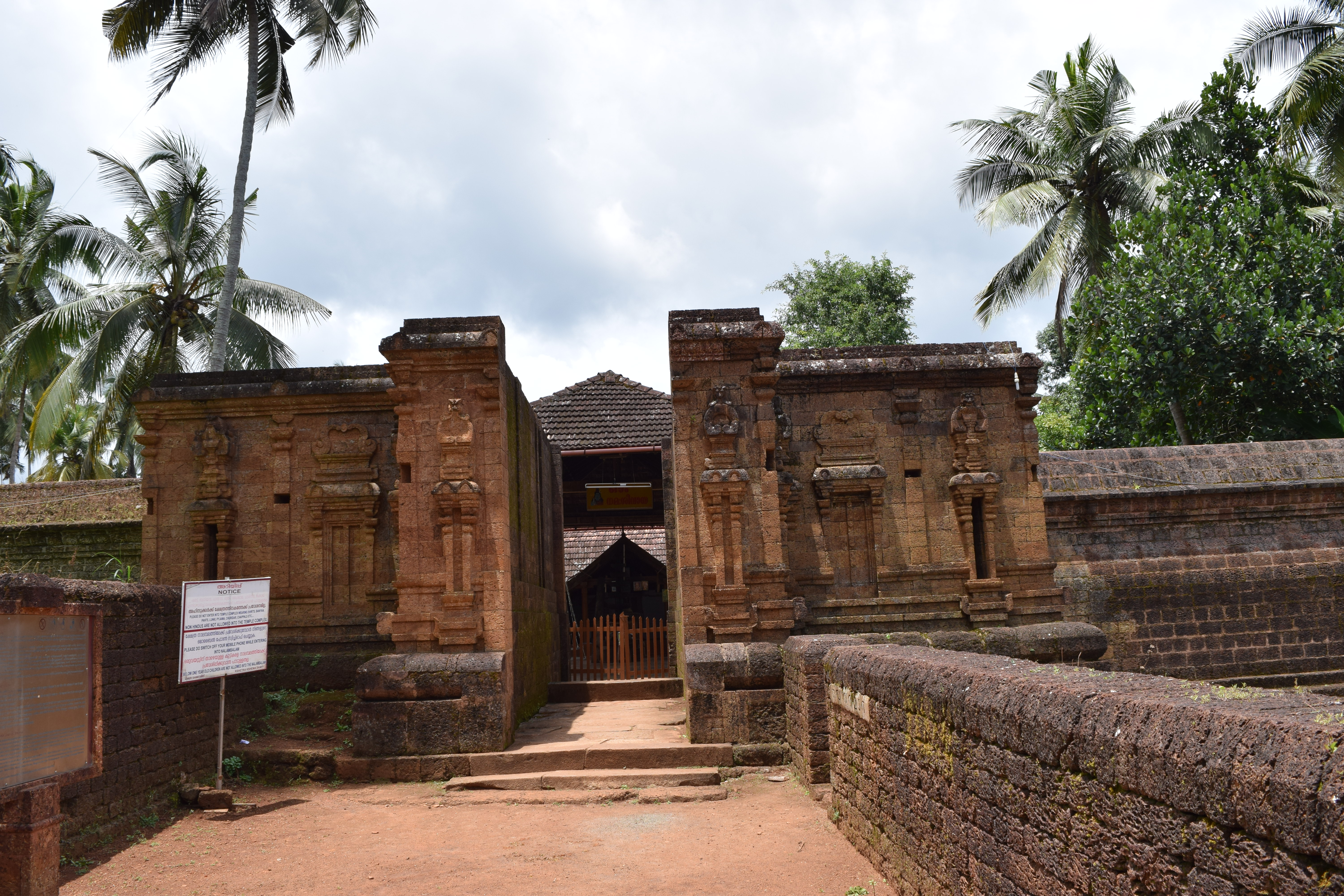
- Main goparum of the Temple

- Mahadeva Temple, Chemmanthatta, Thrissur, Kerala

Religion
- Affiliation: Hinduism
- District: Thrissur
- Deity: Shiva

Location
- Location: Chemmanthatta, Thrissur
- State: Kerala
- Country: India
- Interactive map of Chemmanthatta Mahadeva Temple
- Coordinates: 10.649999°N 76.114982°E

Architecture
- Type: Kerala

Specifications
- Temple: One
- Elevation: 33.41 m (110 ft)

Chemmanthatta Mahadeva Temple is a Hindu temple located in Chemmanthatta, Thrissur District. According to folklore, sage Parashurama installed the idol. It is the part of the 108 Shiva temples of Kerala. Archaeological Survey of India and Kerala Urayma Devaswom board Chemmanthatta control the temple.
