= Kadangode =

- village
- Location in Kerala, India Kadangode (India)
- Coordinates: 10°41′0″N 76°8′0″E
- Country: India
- State: Kerala
- District: Thrissur

Population (2011)
  - Total: 9,016

Languages
  - Official: Malayalam, English
- Time zone: UTC+5:30 (IST)
- PIN: 680584
- Telephone code: +914885
- Vehicle registration: KL-48

Kadangode is a panchayat in Chowanoor block of Thrissur district in the state of Kerala, India. The nearest towns are Erumapetty and Kunnamkulam at a distance of 9 km.
