= Vizhinjam Cave Temple =

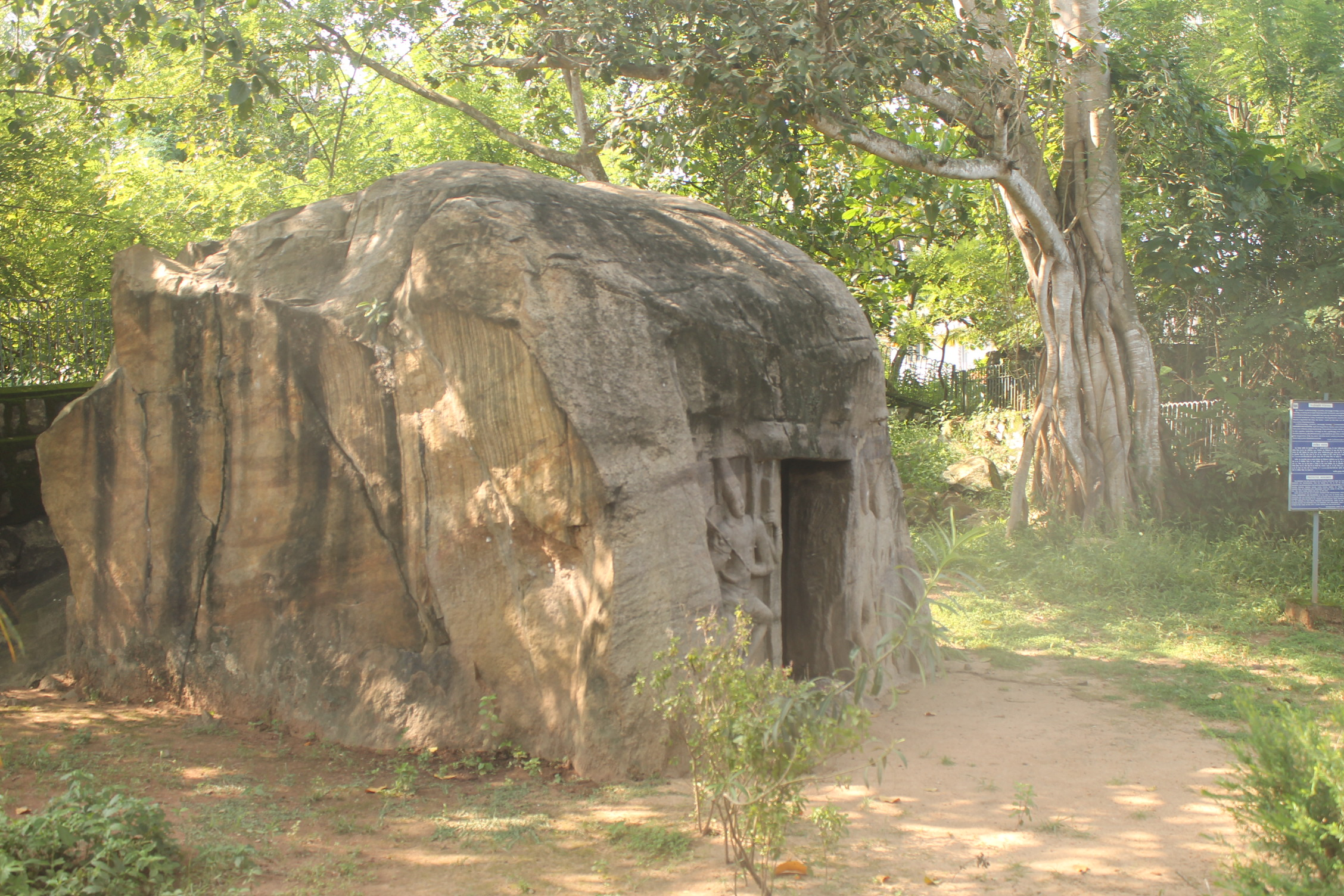
- Vizhinjam Cave Temple

- Location in Kerala, India
- Location: Trivandrum, Kerala

Vizhinjam Cave Temple is an ancient Hindu temple at Vizhinjam, near Trivandrum in southern Kerala, India.

The granite cave encloses a one-celled shrine with a loose sculpture of Vinadhara Dakshinamurti. The outer wall of the cave depicts unfinished reliefs of Siva as "Tripurantakara" on the left and as "Nataraja" with Parvati on the right (the unfinished Pallava dvarapalakas).

The temple is located about 17 kilometers from Trivandrum city centre. Vizhinjam served as headquarters of the Ay kings who ruled the southern parts of Kerala in the 8th century.

== Image gallery ==
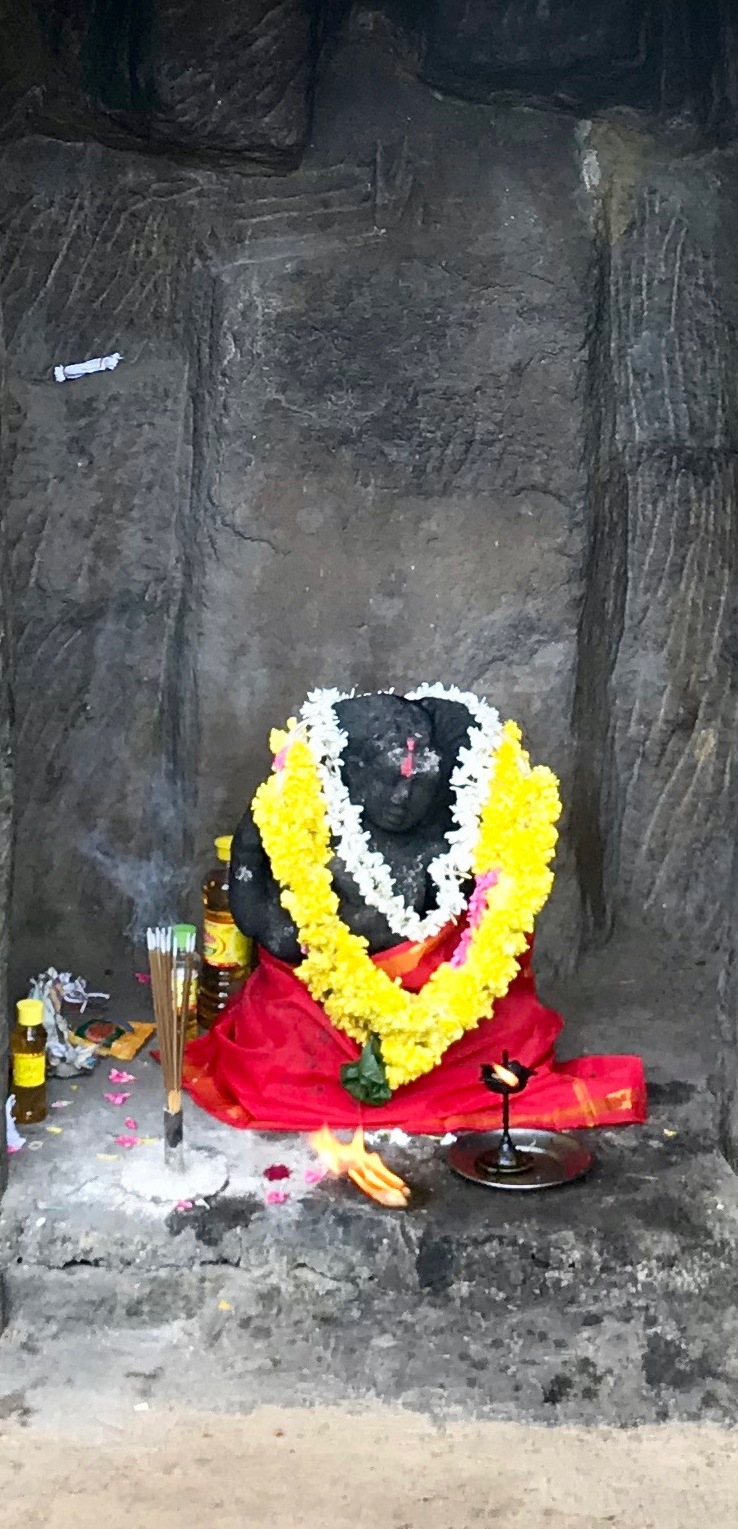
Four armed Siva as "Vinadhara Dakshinamurti"

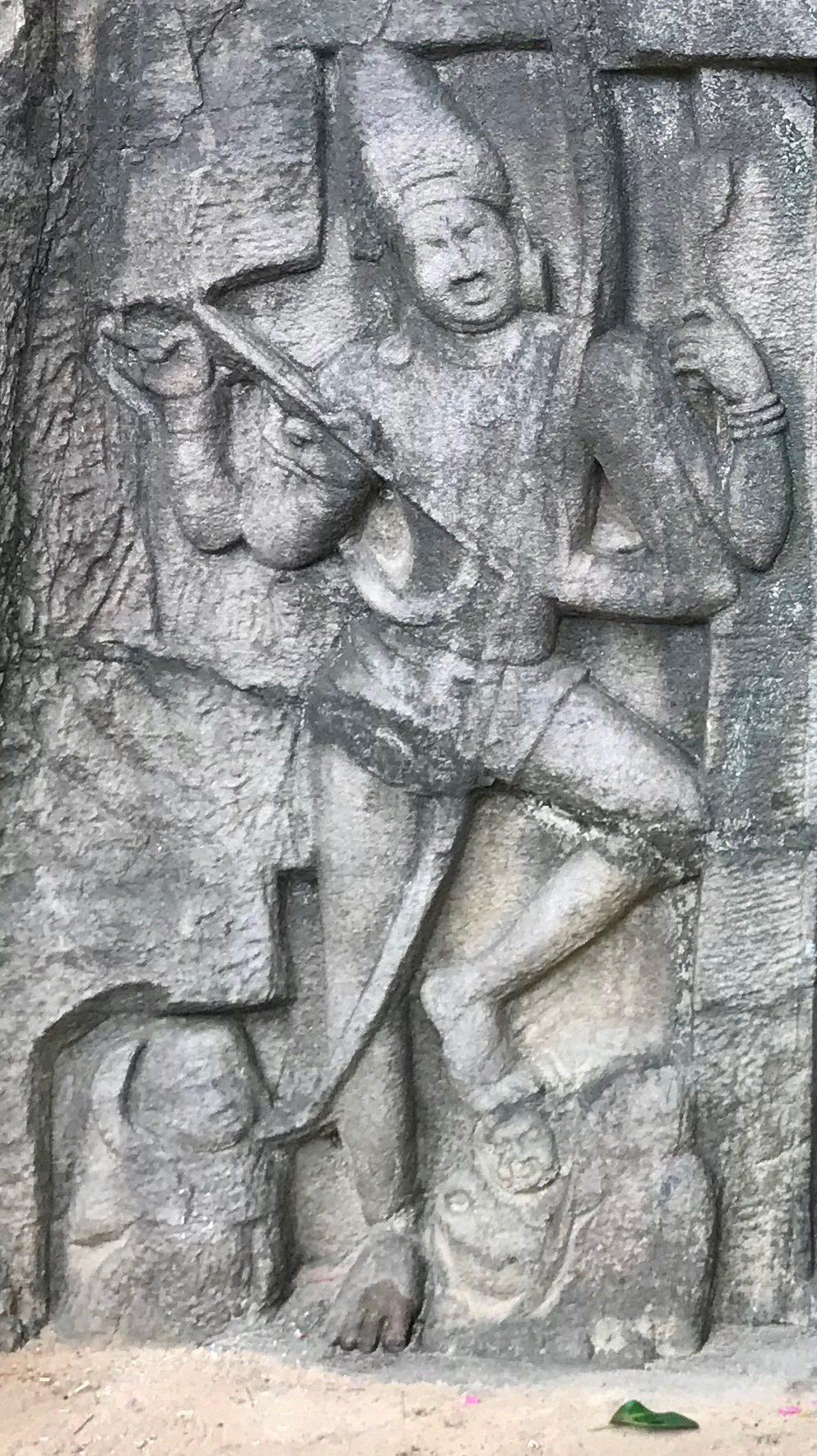
Siva as "Tripurantaka" (with Apasmara under left his foot)

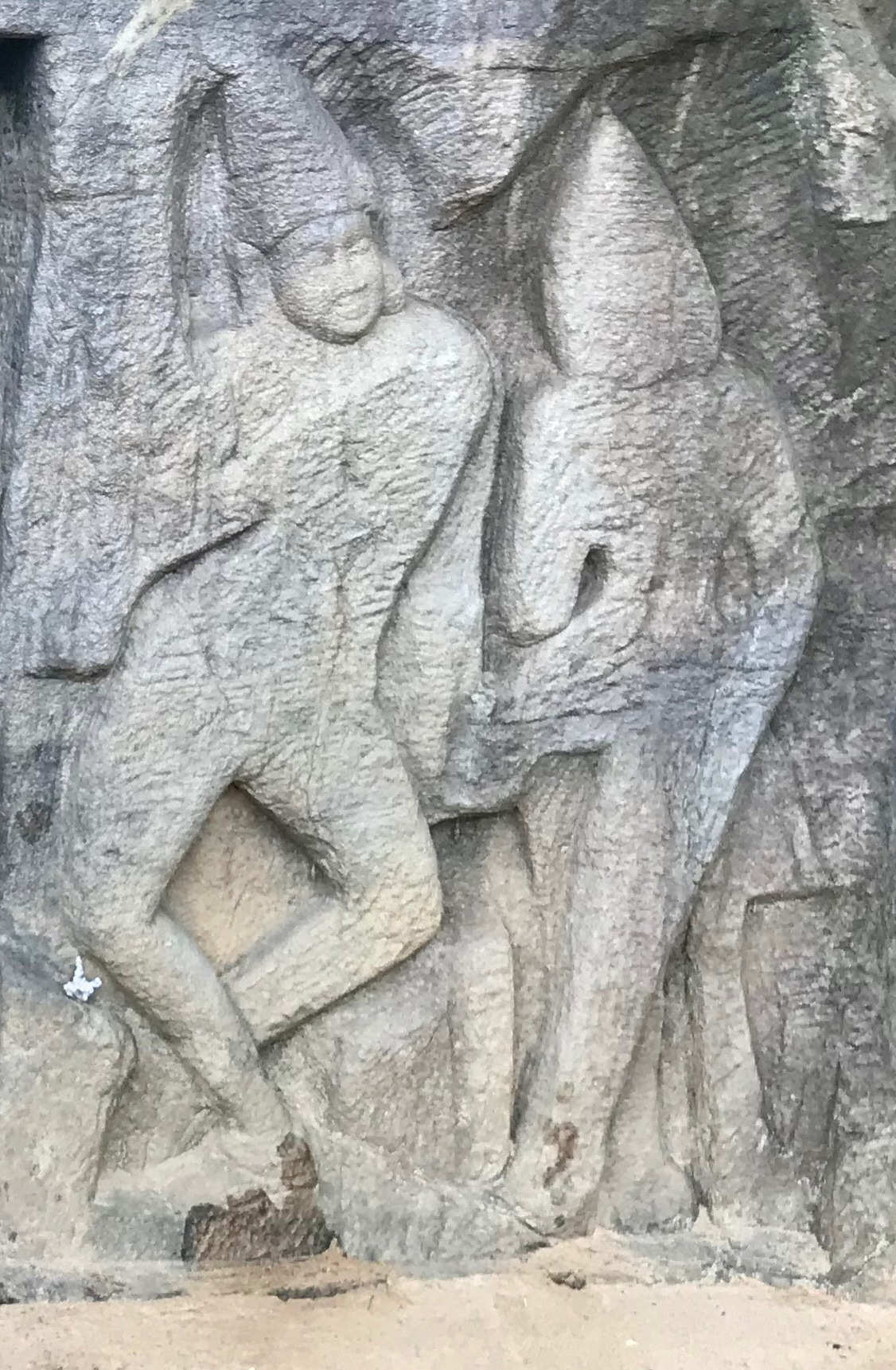
Siva as "Nataraja" with Parvati
