= Palakkad Fort =

Fort in Palakkad

Palakkad Fort, Palakkad
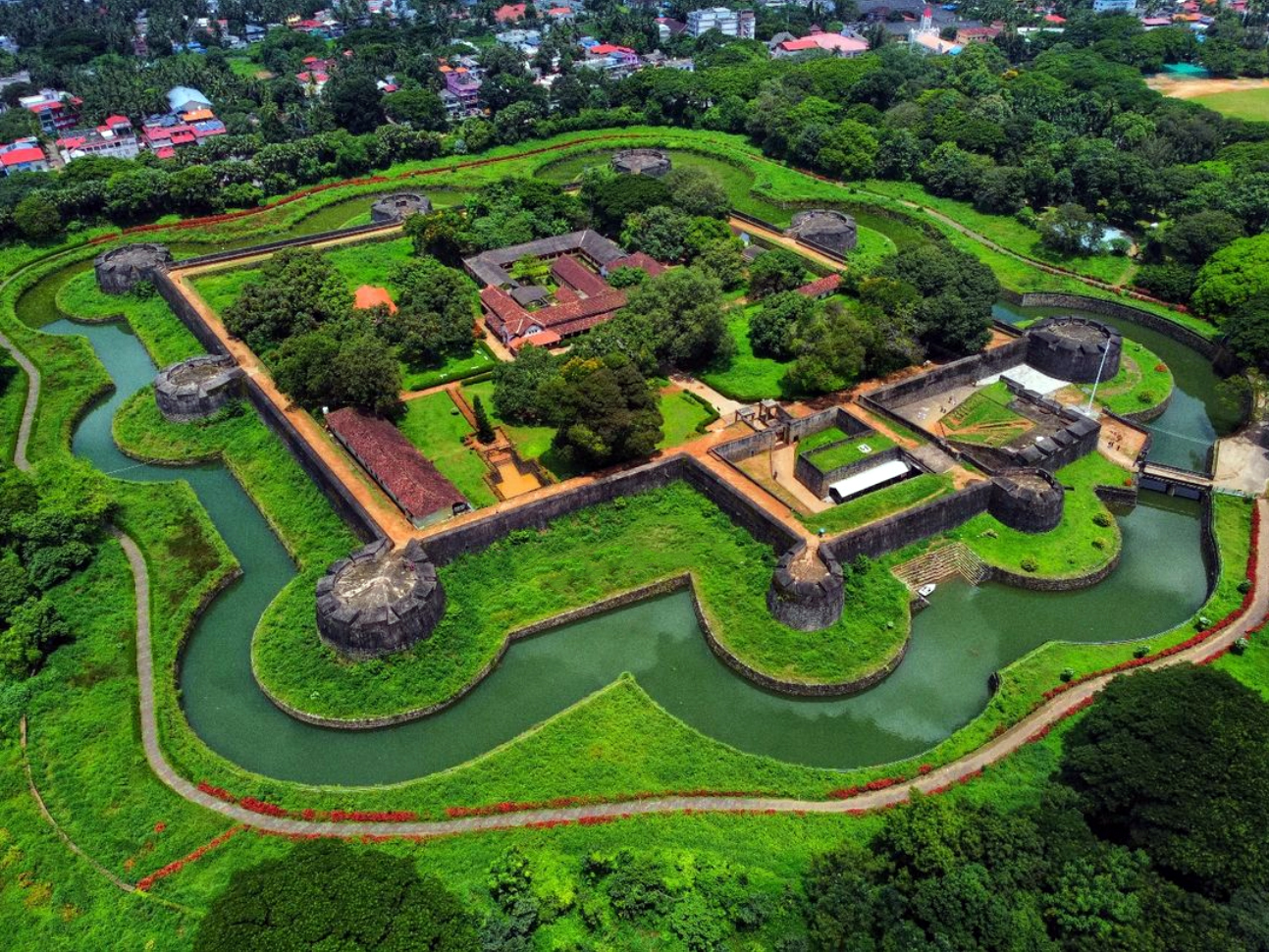
- An aerial view Palakkad Fort

- Location in Kerala, India
- 10.7676°N 76.6614°E
- Location: Palakkad, Kerala, India

Palakkad Fort is an old fort situated in the heart of Palakkad city in Kerala state, southern India.

== History ==
The Palakkad Fort is said to have existed from very ancient times but believed to be constructed in the present form in 1766 CE, however little is known of its early history. The local ruler, Palakkad Achchan, was originally a tributary of the Zamorin but had become independent before the beginning of the 18th-century. In 1757 he sent a deputation to Hyder Ali seeking help against an invasion threatened by the Zamorin. Hyder Ali seized upon the opportunity to gain possession of a strategically important location such as Palghat and from that time until 1790 the fort was continually in the hands of the Mysore Sultans or the British. It was first taken by the latter in 1768 when Colonel Wood captured it during his raid on Hyder Ali's fortresses, but it was retaken by Hyder a few months later. It was recaptured by Colonel Fullarton in 1783, after a siege that lasted eleven days but was abandoned the following year. It later fell into the hands of the Zamorin's troops. In 1790 it was finally captured by the British under Colonel Stuart. It was renovated and was used as a base for operations that ended with the storming of Srirangapatnam. The fort continued to be garrisoned until the middle of the 19th century. In the early 1900s, it was converted into a taluk office.

== Current status ==
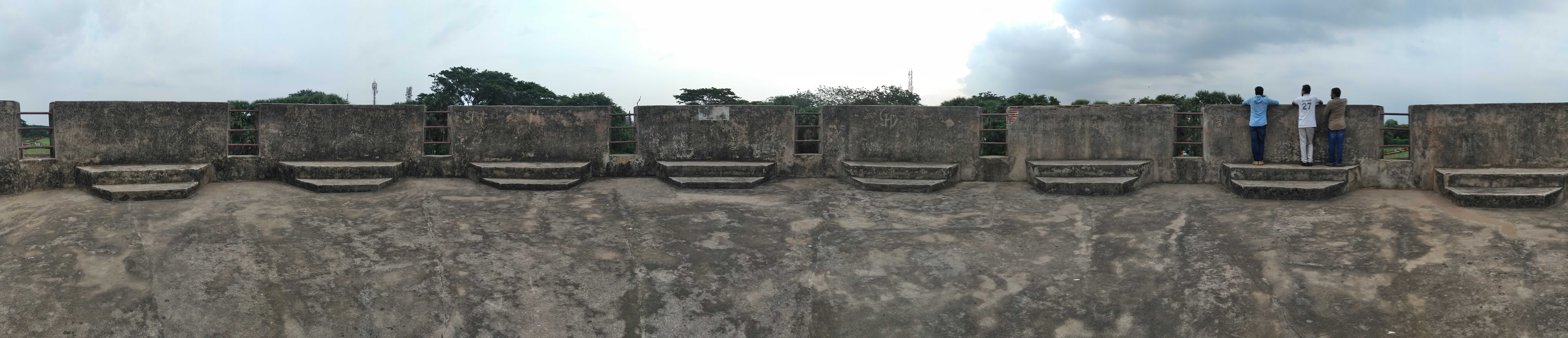
A Panorama view of Palakkad Fort from top of the fort.

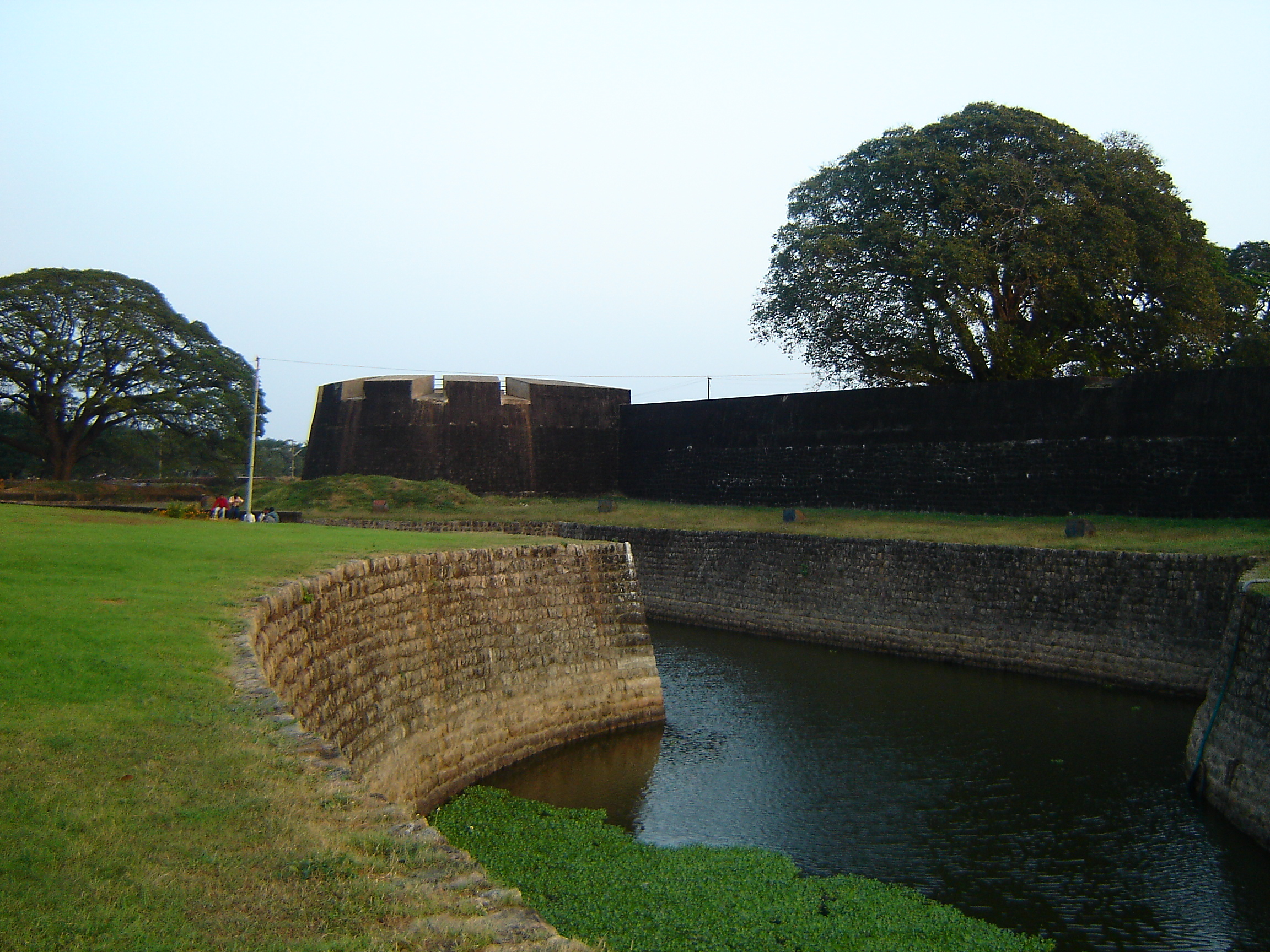
Palakkad Fort

There is a large ground between the Fort and the Palakkad Townhall, known as Kota Maidanam (Fort Maidan/Fort Grounds). The ground is now used to stage cricket matches, exhibitions, and public meetings. An open-air auditorium called "Rappadi", currently under the preservation of the Archeological Survey of India, is also located within the spacious grounds of the Fort. Additionally, there is a children's park on one side of the Fort.This children's park is known by the name "Vatika", which has a beautiful garden alongside outdoor playground equipments for kids.

== Interior ==
The Palakkad Special Sub Jail is also located within the fort. A garden called Vatika-Shilavatika is maintained inside the court.

== Satellite image of the fort ==
- Satellite image of the fort

== See also ==
- Kingdom of Mysore
- Zamorin of Calicut

== Image gallery ==
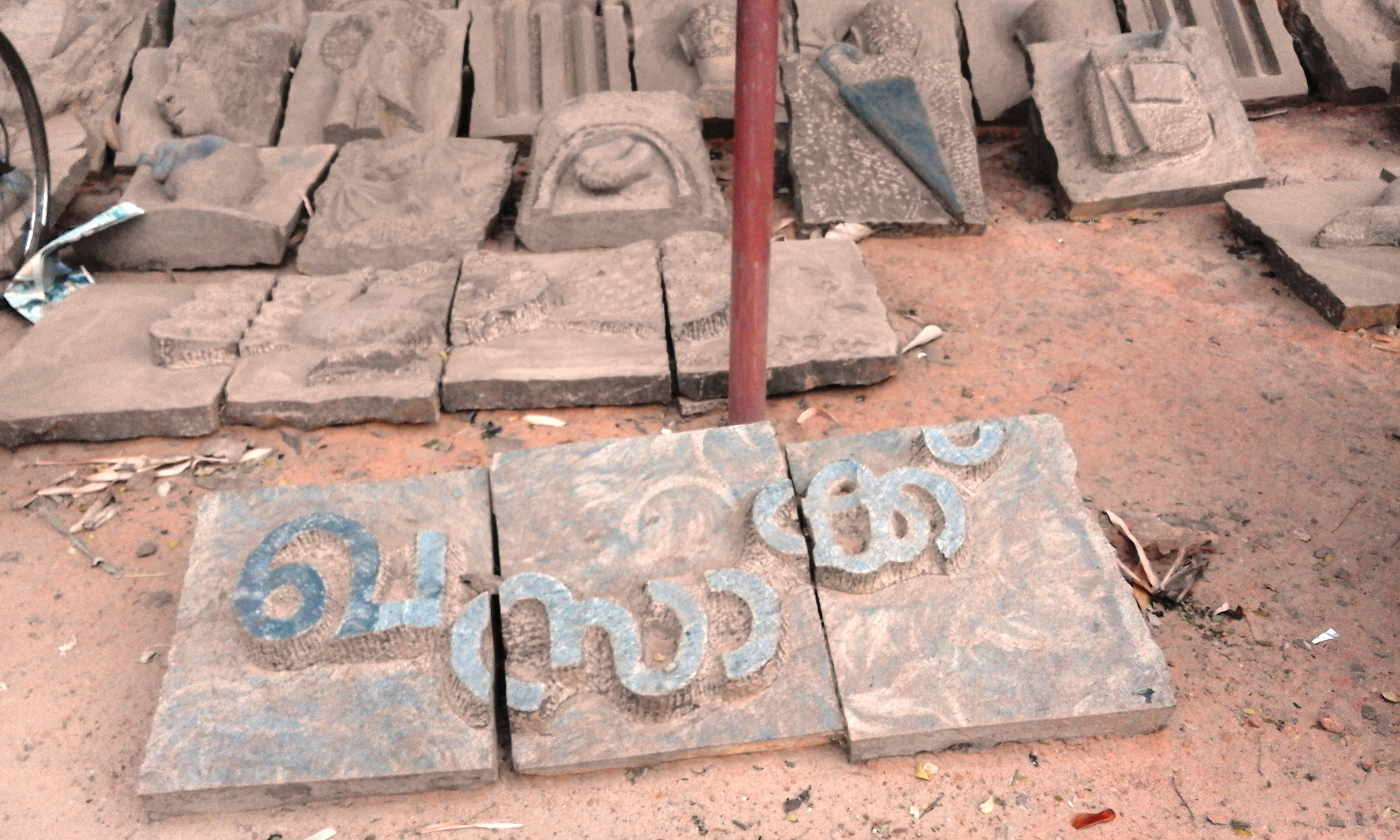
O.V.Vijayan Characters

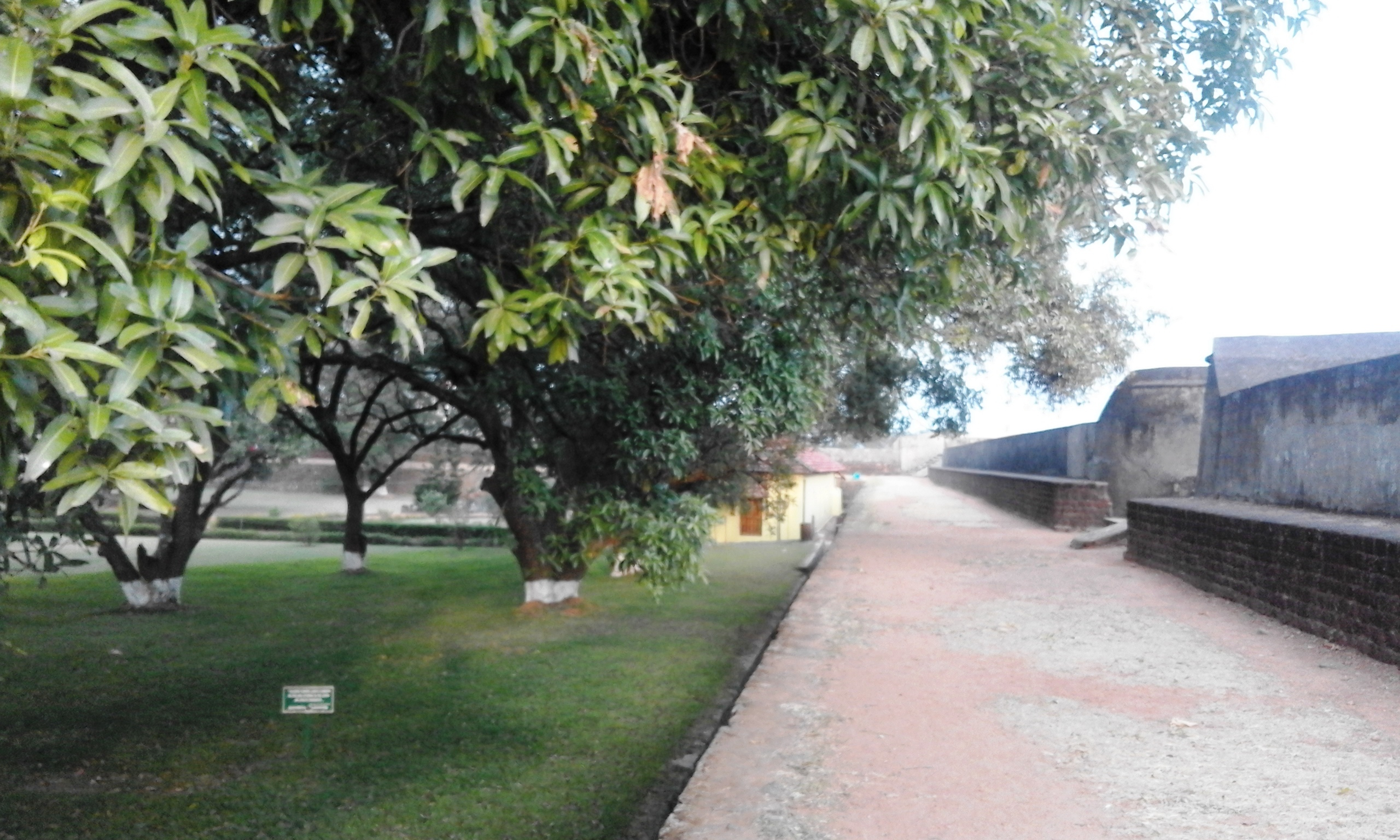
Mango Tree

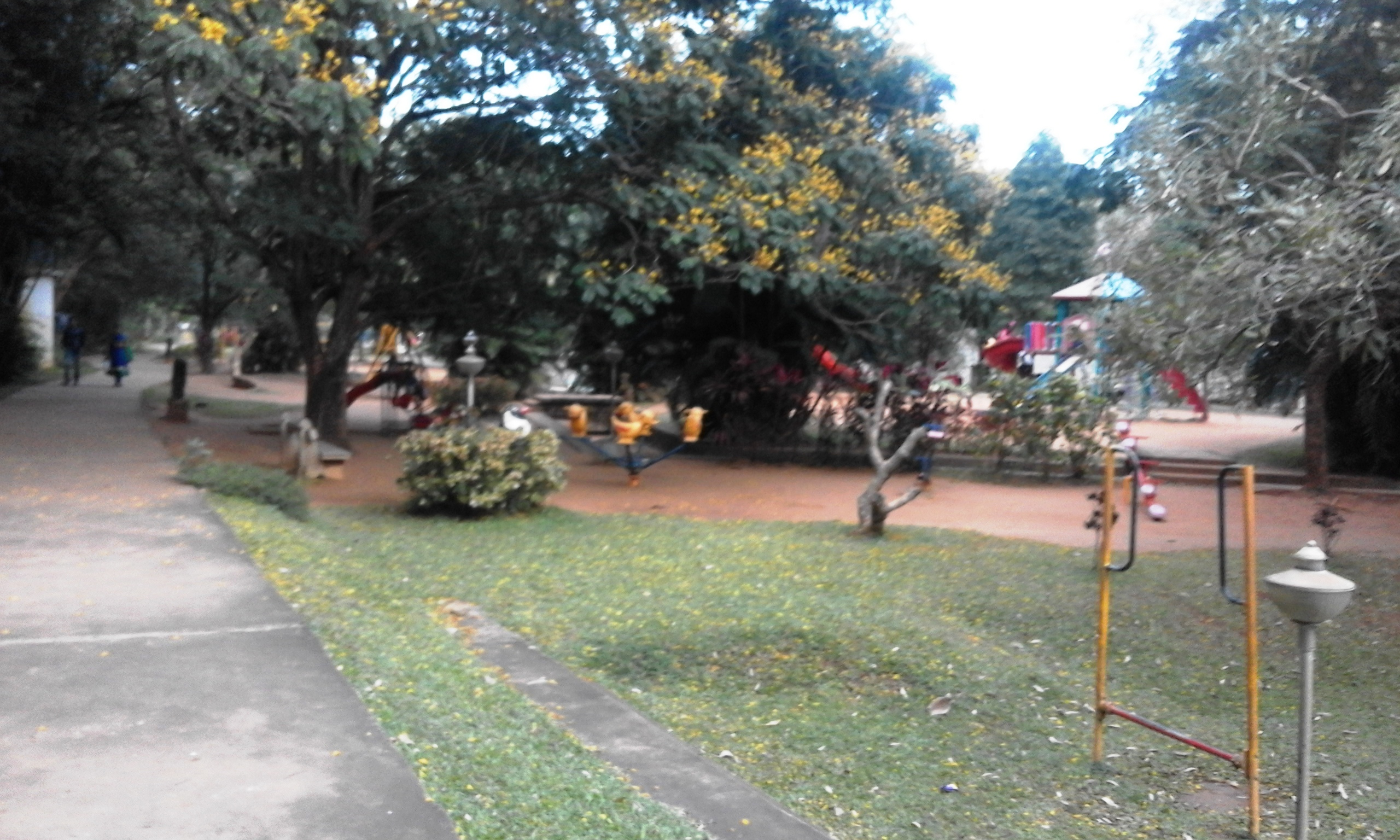
inside the fort

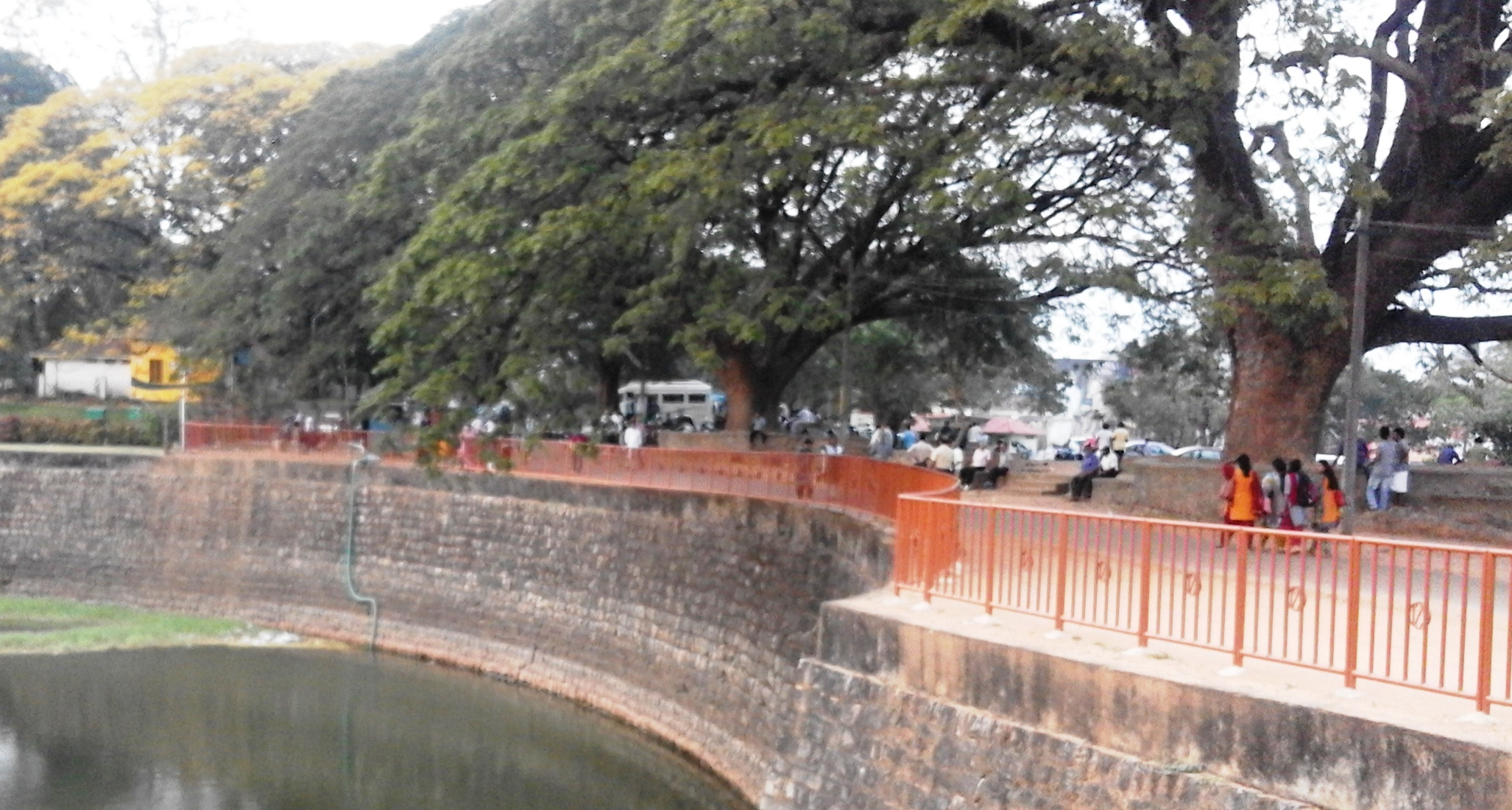
View from the bridge

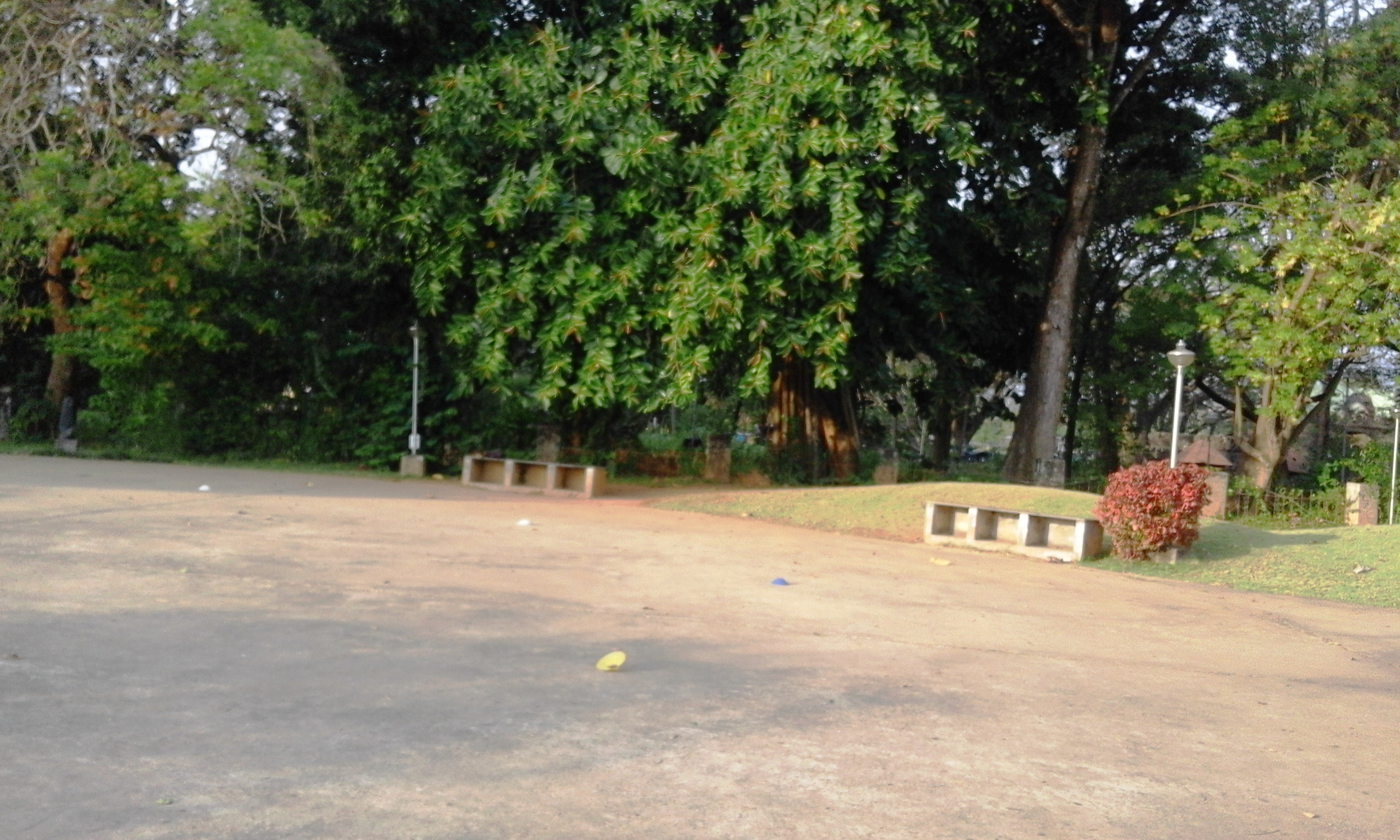
Skiing space

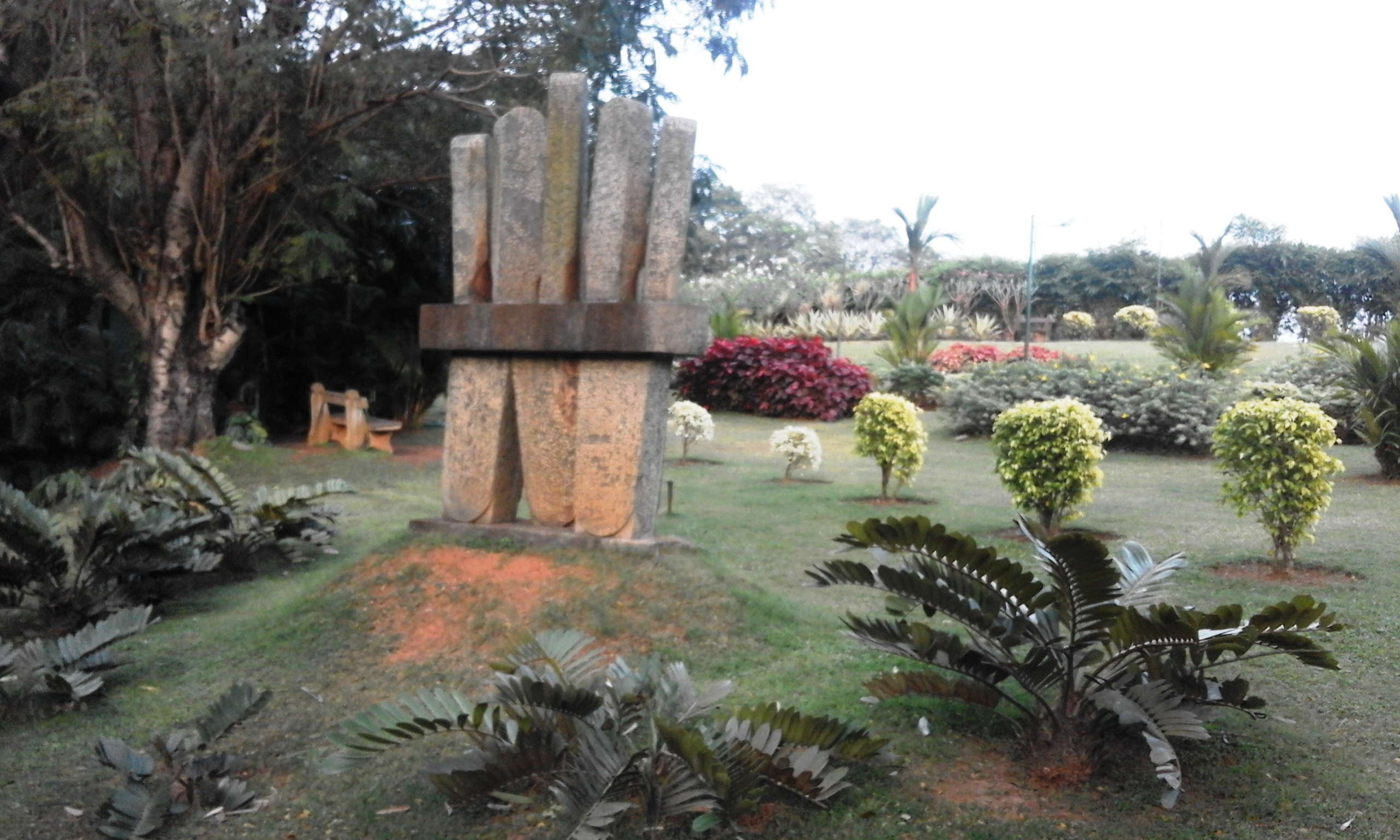
Inuksuk from V.K.Rajan, Thrissur

https://photos.google.com/photo/AF1QipO6JWIjp2dQLIHBa4Oz_S8c1vL53N6EBxA0wiFg dileepthenur
