= Chovvanur burial cave =

Archaeological site in Kerala, India

Coordinates: 10.6559291°N 76.0824473°E

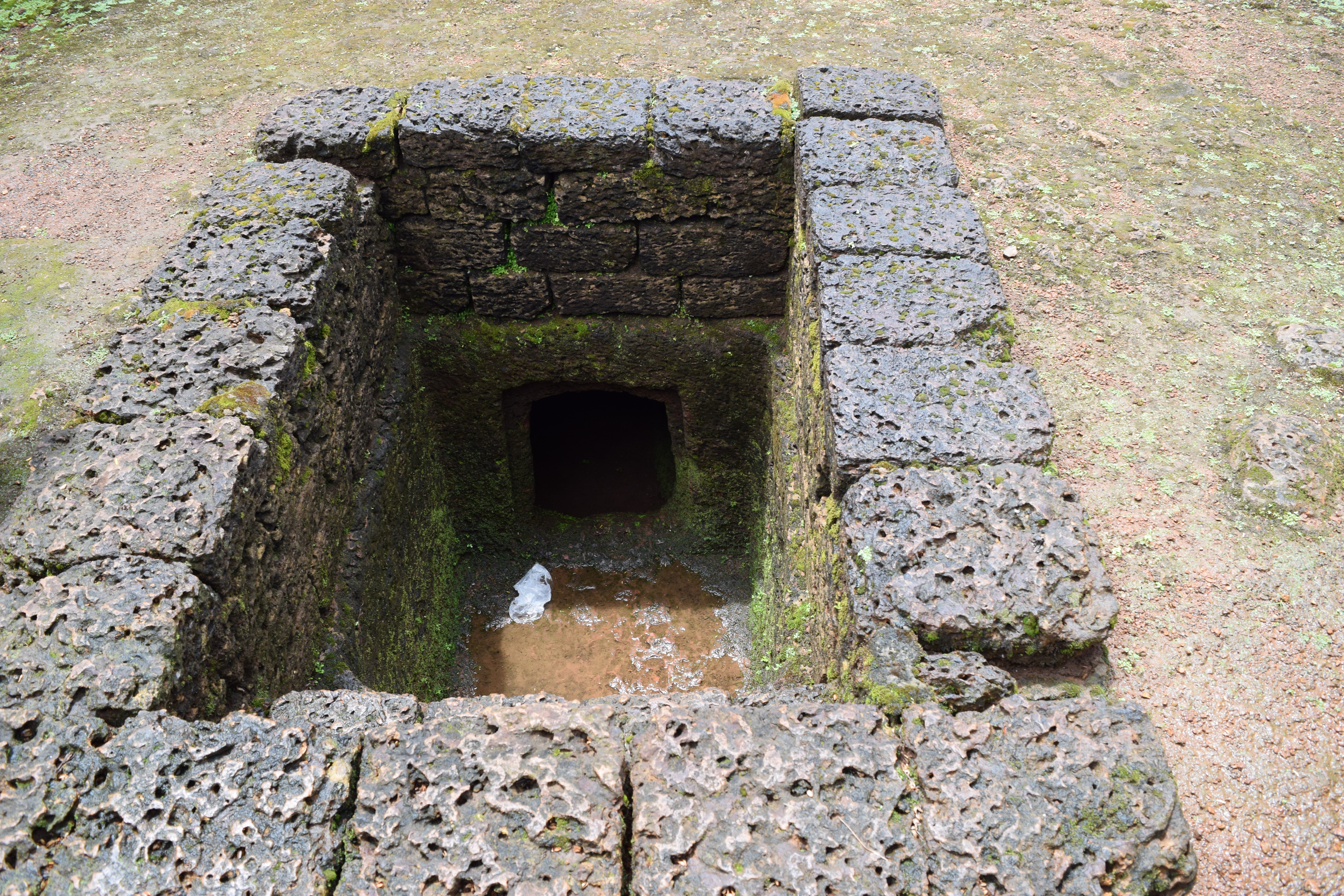
Burial Cave at Chowannoor, Thrissur District, Kerala

Chovvanur Burial Cave is a prehistoric Megalith rock cut cave situated in Chowannur, of Thrissur District of Kerala. The cave can be accessed from single entry and its chamber is circular. The cave has a single chamber and two benches. The Archaeological Survey of India has declared this cave as centrally protected monument.

== See also ==
- Archaeology in India
- Timeline of Indian history
- List of Indus Valley Civilisation sites
- List of archaeological sites by country § India
- World Heritage Sites by country § India
