= Kudakkallu Parambu =

Historic burial site in Thrissur, Kerala

- കുടക്കല്ല് പറമ്പ് (Malayalam)
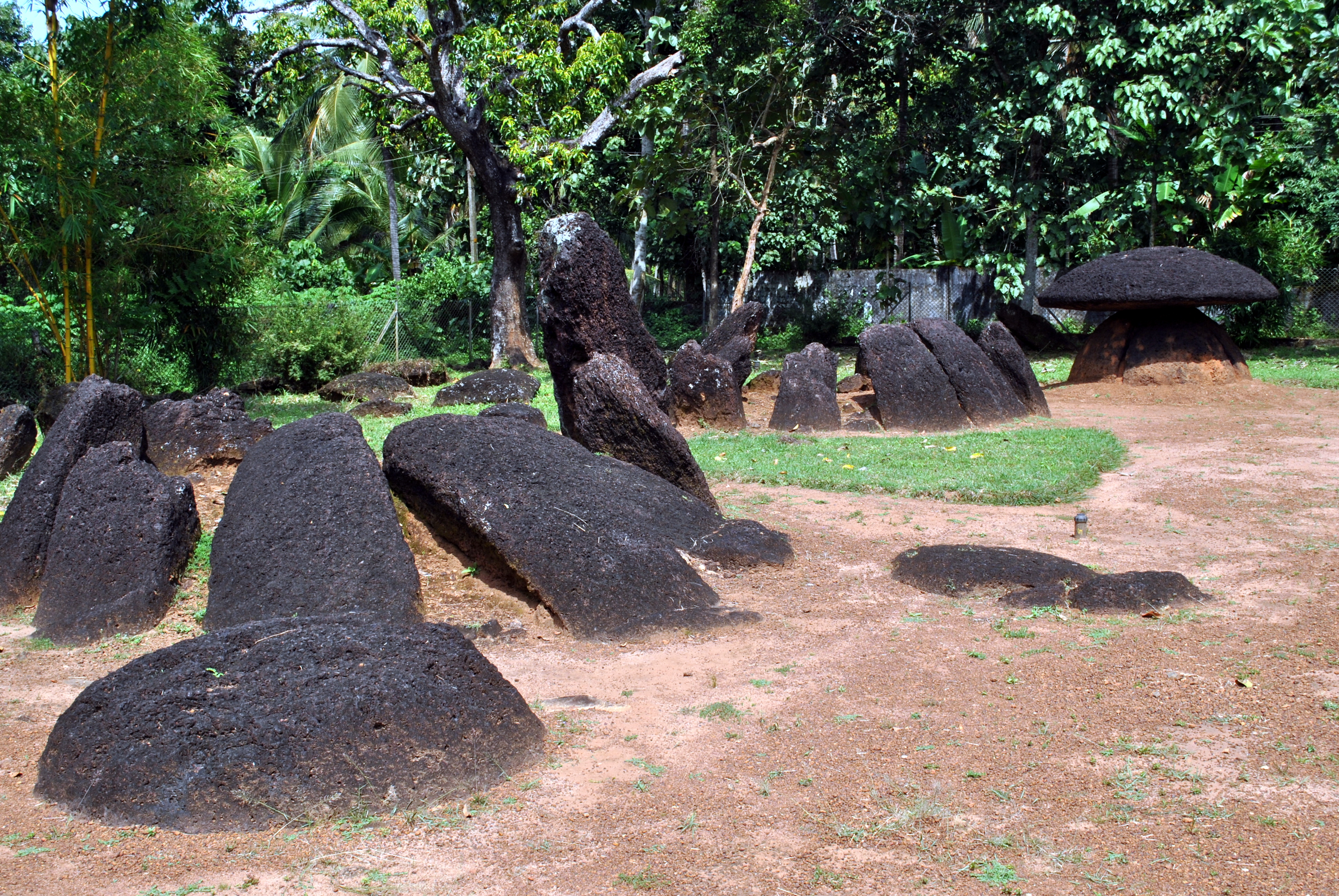
- The megalith in 2012
- Interactive map of Kudakkallu Parambu
- Type: Megalith
- Location: Chermanangad, Kerala, India

History
- Built: c. 2000 BC

Site notes
- Material: Stone

Kudakkallu Parambu is a prehistoric Megalith burial site located in Chermanangad of Thrissur District of Kerala. The site has 69 megalithic monuments spread over a small area. Different types of burials in this area include Topikkal, Kudakkal, multiple hood stones and stone circles. The Archaeological Survey of India says that these monuments were built around 2000 BC. The Archaeological Survey of India has declared it as a centrally protected monument.

== Gallery ==
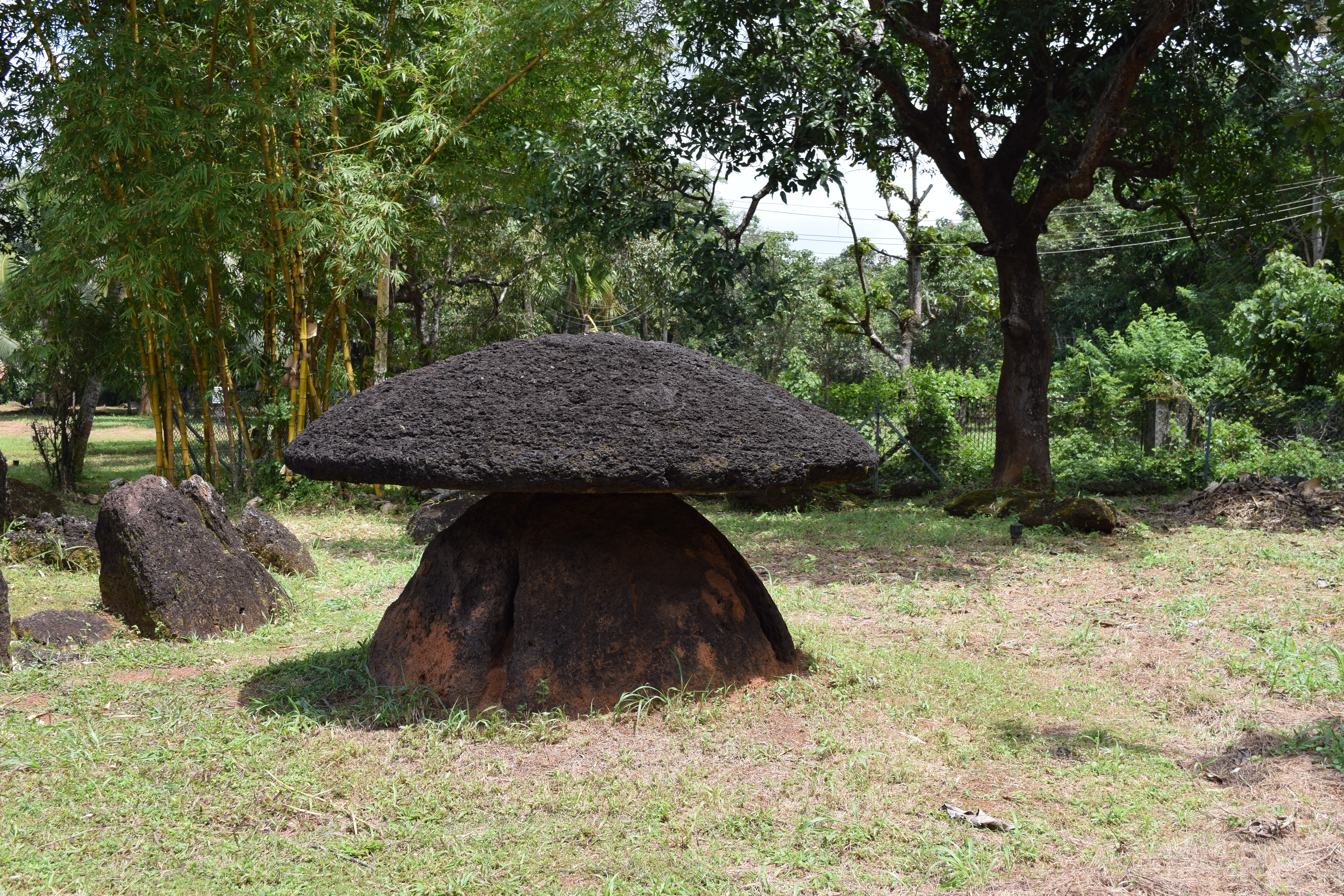
Kudakkallu Parambu

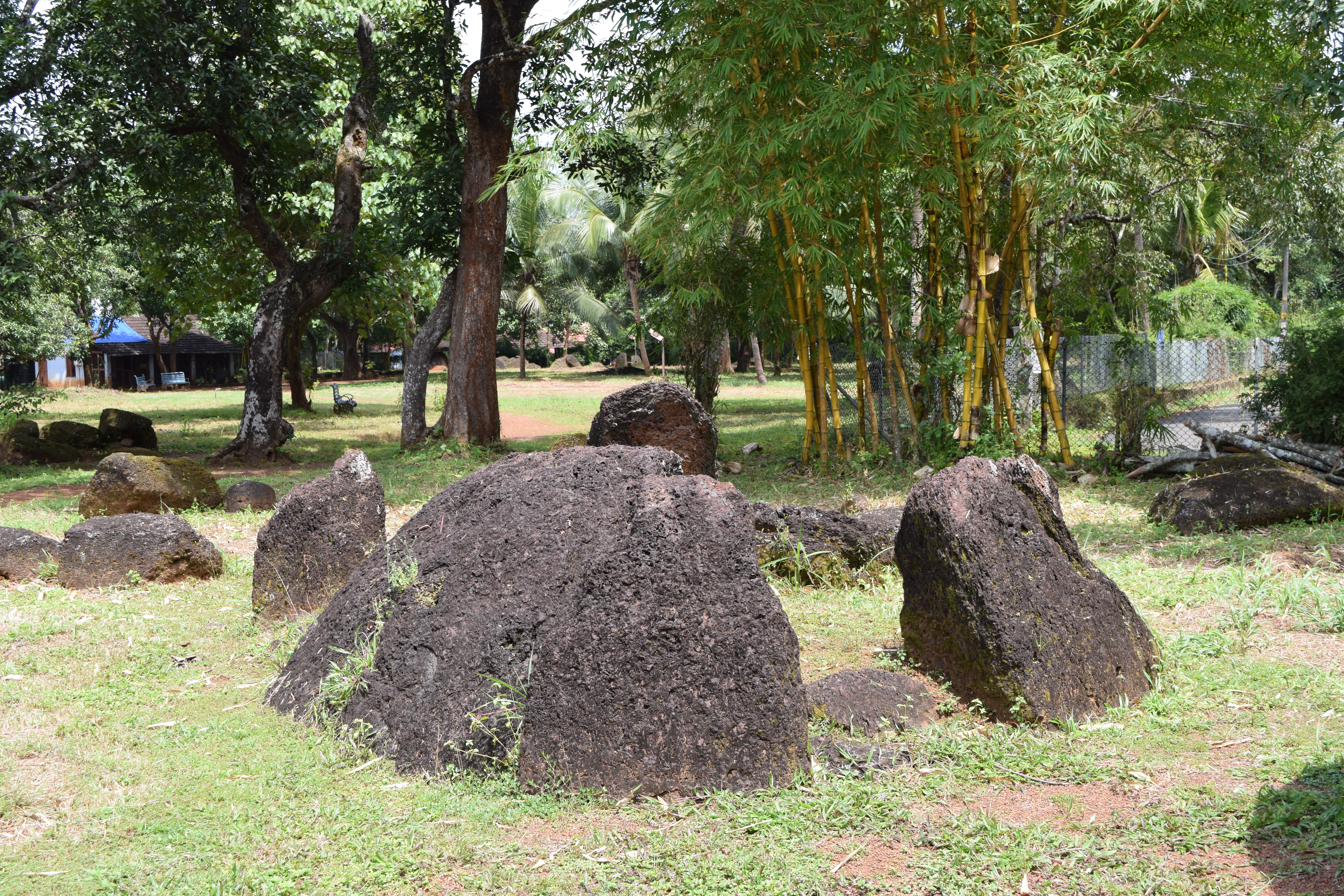
Kudakkallu Parambu

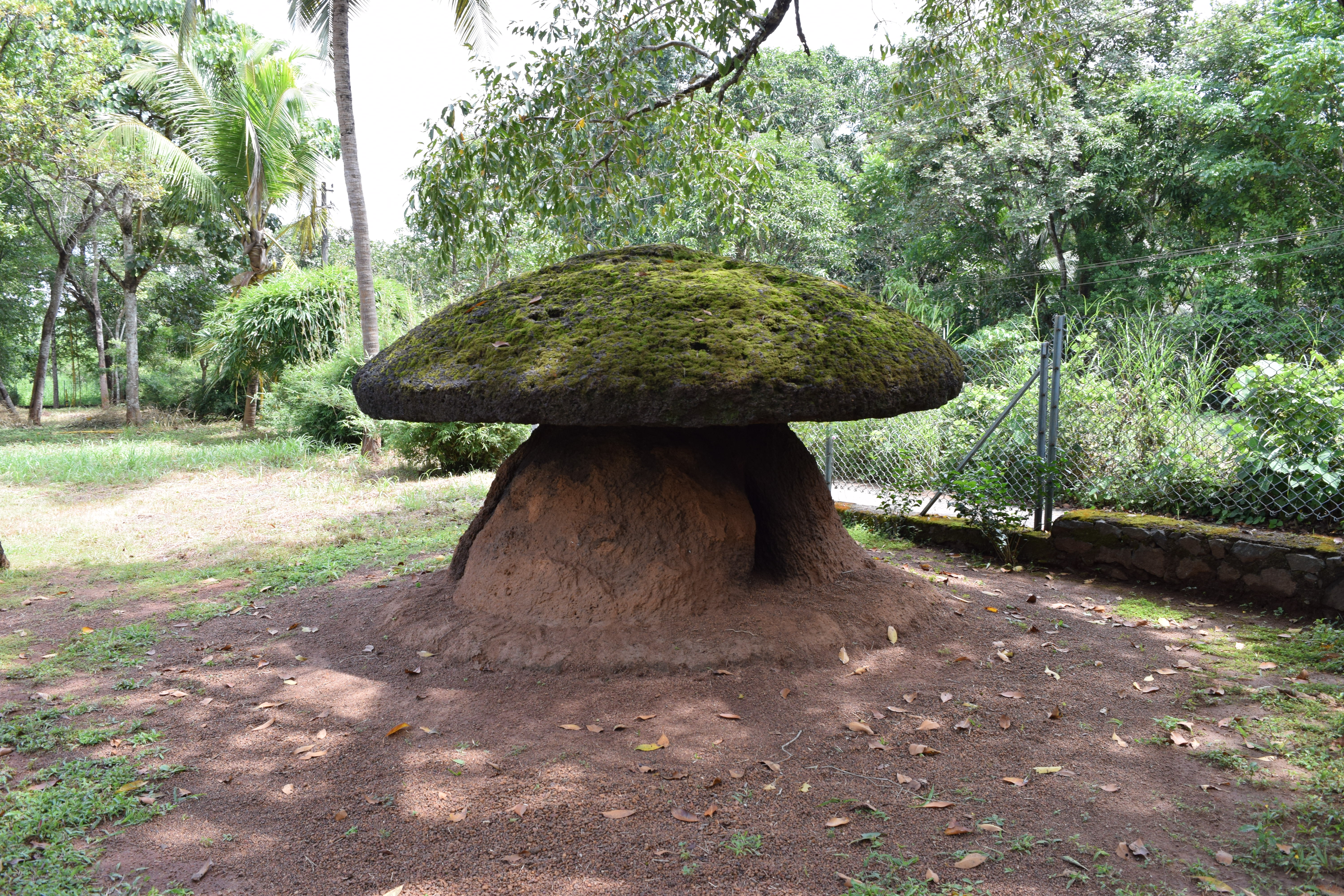
Kudakkallu Parambu

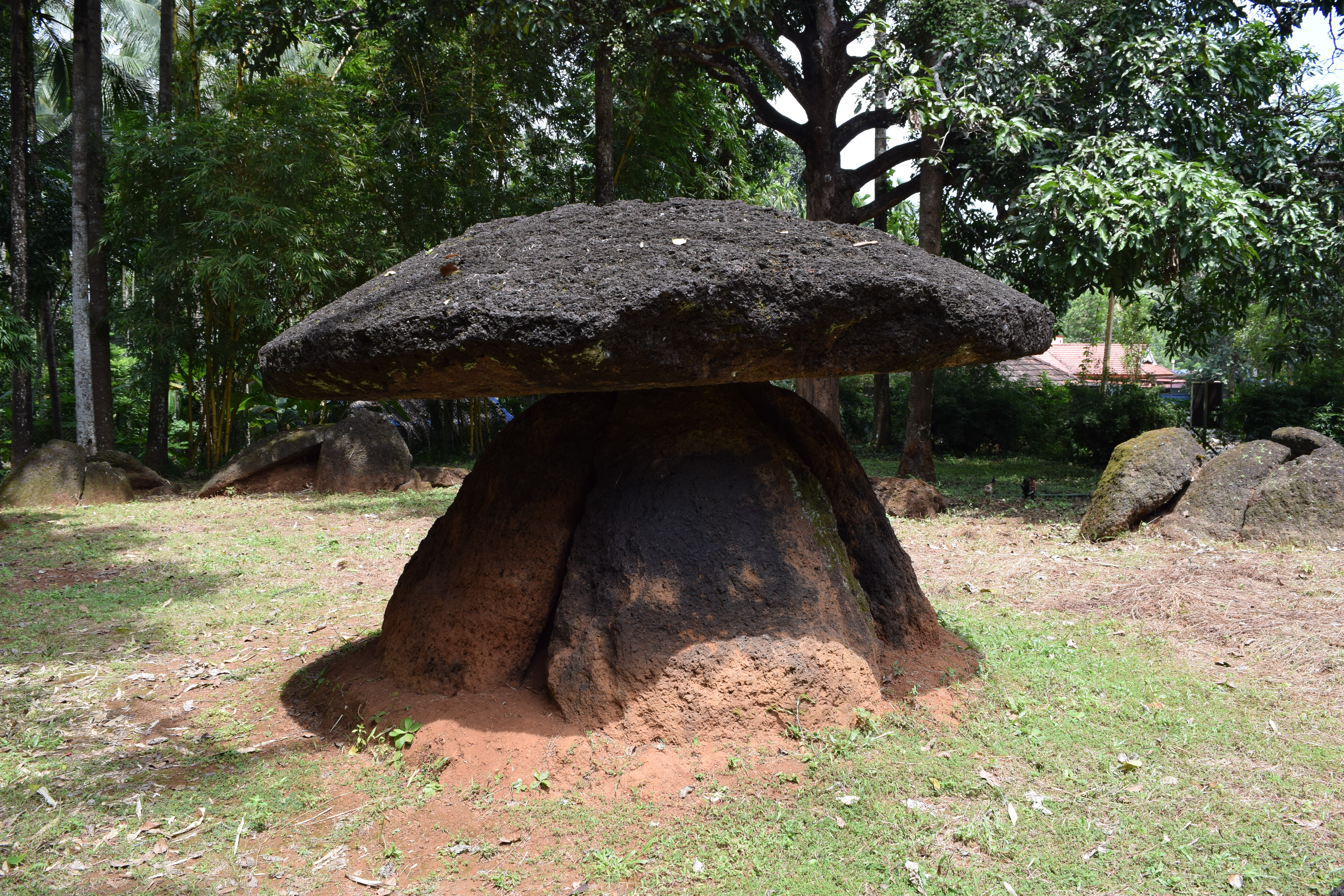
Kudakkallu Parambu

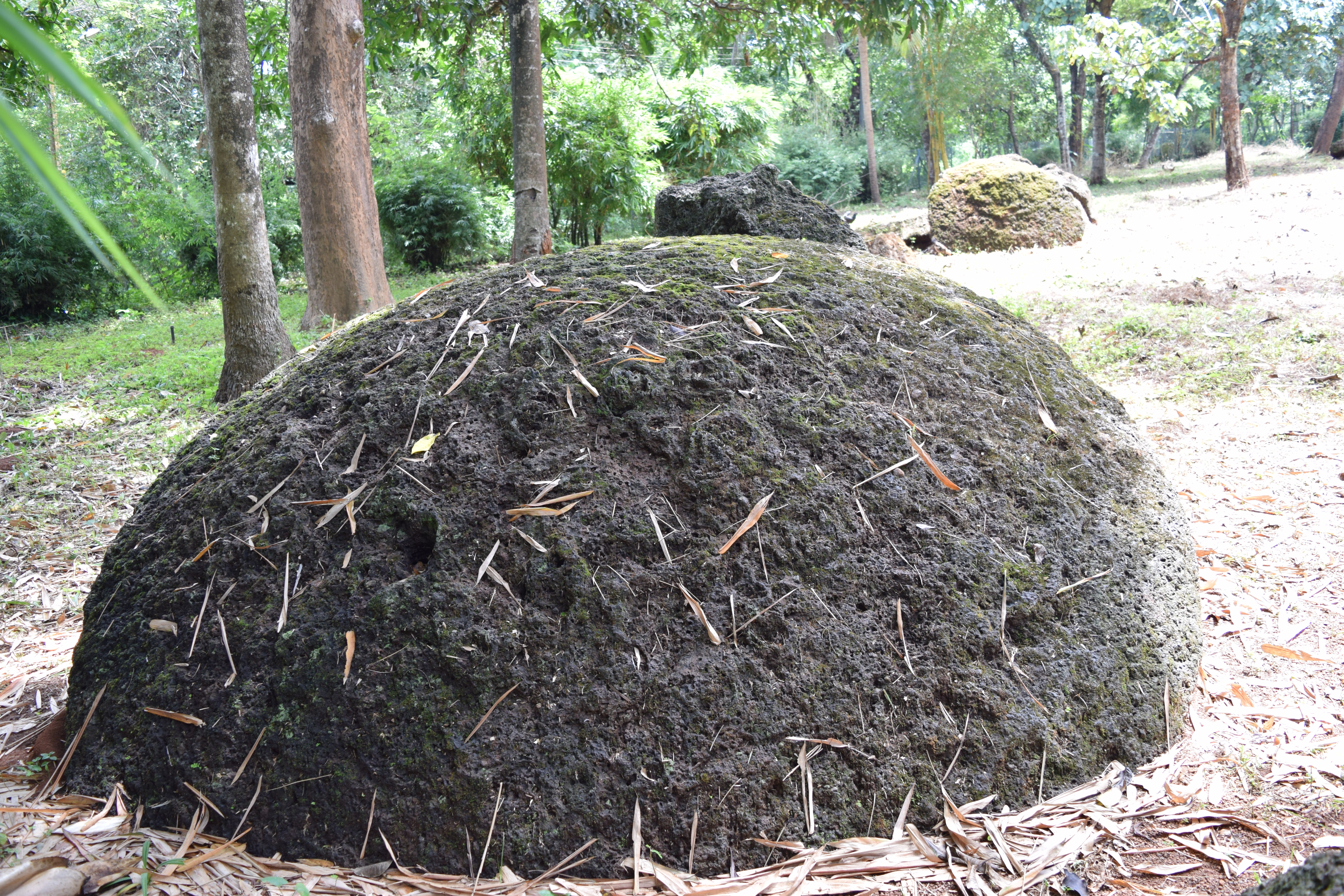
Kudakkallu Parambu

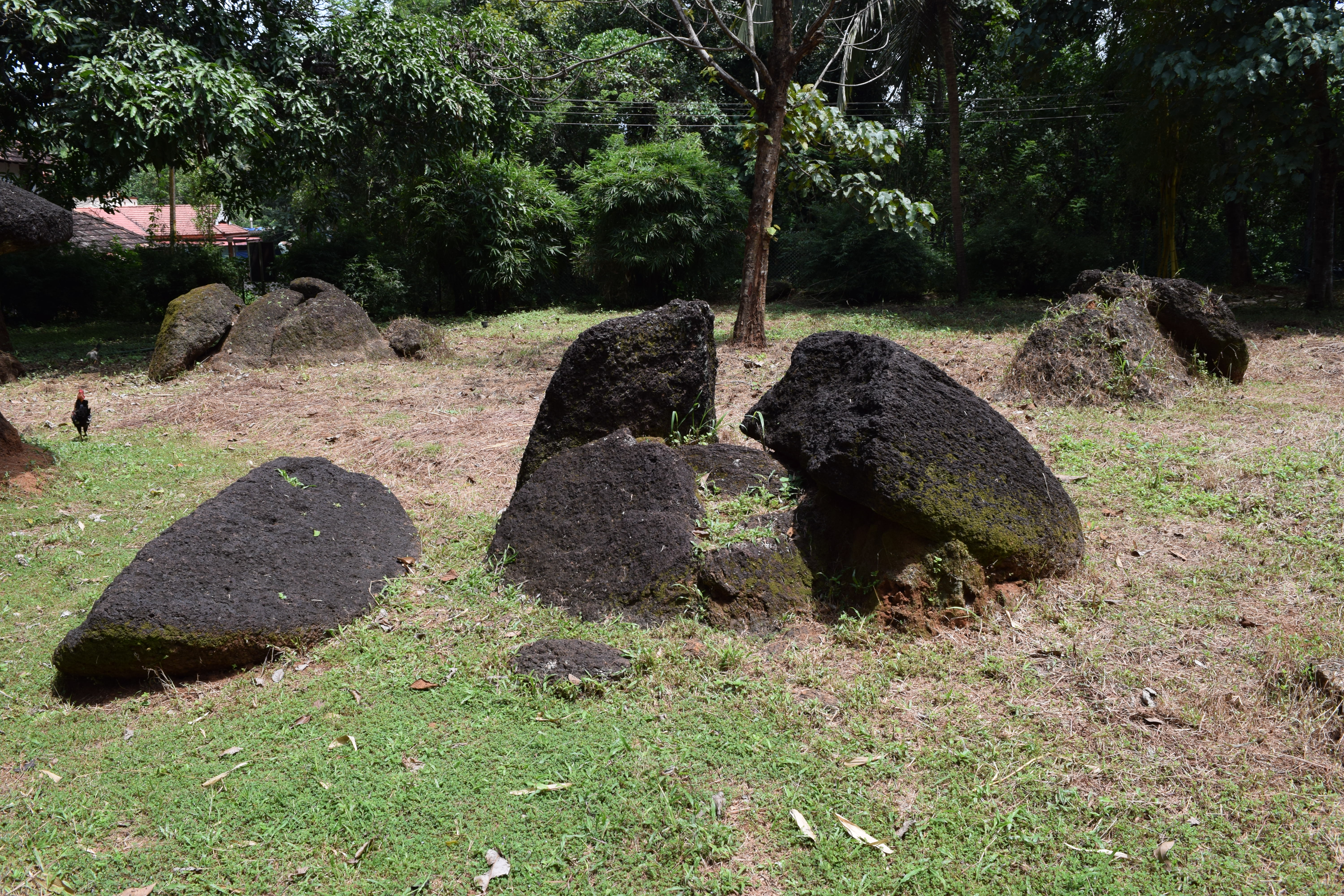
Kudakkallu Parambu

== See also ==
- Archaeology in India
- Timeline of Indian history
- List of Indus Valley Civilisation sites
- List of archaeological sites by country § India
- World Heritage Sites by country § India
