= Vizhinjam =

- Neighbourhood
- Location in Kerala, India Vizhinjam (India)
- Coordinates: 8°22′45″N 76°59′29″E
- Country: India
- State: Kerala
- District: Thiruvananthapuram

Government
  - Type: Corporation
  - Body: Thiruvananthapuram Corporation

Languages
  - Official: Malayalam, English
- Time zone: UTC+5:30 (IST)
- PIN: 695521
- Telephone code: 0471
- Vehicle registration: KL-20

Vizhinjam (Malayalam: [ʋiɻiɲːɐm]) is an area located in the city of Thiruvananthapuram, the capital city of the state of Kerala in India. which belongs to Thiruvananthapuram Corporation. Vizhinjam is the 66th ward of the Trivandrum Corporation. It is located 16 km south west from the city centre and 17 km south of Trivandrum International Airport along NH66. Adani Ports (APSEZ), India’s biggest private port operator, is devoloping India's first deep water Transshipment Terminal owned by Vizhinjam International Seaport Limited Thiruvananthapuram in this area which was inaugurated by Indian Prime Minister Narendra Modi on 2nd of May 2025. It is a state owned port, owned by the Government of Kerala and will be operated by the Adani Group for a period of 40 years.

== History ==
The region around Vizhinjam has been known for maritime trade since ancient times. Pottery finds from the area indicates that Vizhinjam has been a part of Indian Ocean trade at least since the second century BCE. It has been suggested that the coastal town named as Balita in the Periplus of the Erythrean Sea is likely Vizhinjam.

=== Ay kingdom ===
The region was controlled by the Ay dynasty between 8th to 11th century CE with Vizhinjam as their capital. The Ay kingdom extended between Nagercoil and Thiruvalla. Several temples dating to this period can be found in and around Vizhinjam. When the kings of the Ay dynasty shifted their capital to Vizhinjam, they built a fort which is now considered to be the oldest fort in Kerala dating to the eighth or ninth century.

During the second Sangam period (circa 850–1400 CE), the region was the scene of many battles between the Kulashekhara and the Cholas and Vizhinjam, the capital, was sacked by the Cholas. A preliminary investigation by University of Kerala led by archaeologist Ajit Kumar has revealed the fort might have originally been 800 m^{2} (8,600 sq ft) in area. The fort's wall can be found on the northern and western (seaside) parts and has been constructed using large boulders set in mud mortar. The wide base of the wall tapers on its way up. Even now this part of Vizhinjam is known as Kottapuram, 'Kotta' Malayalam means Fort. The team was also able to trace literary and epigraphical references - of 9th to 12th century CE. Sangam era texts such as Pandikkovai, Iraiyanar Akapporul Kalingattuparani of Jayamkondar, and Vikrama Chola are said to have numerous references to the existence of a fort, port and a mansion at Vizhinjam.

Srivaramangalam copper plates of Pandyan King Nedum Chadayan (8th century CE) have reference to Vizhinjam and its fort.

The Dutch had commercial establishments here. The Dutch have built a church in Vizhinjam near to the sea shore, which is still functional and is referred as the Old Vizhinjam Church (Old St. Mary's Church). It is located in the Vizhinjam fishing harbour area.

As per historians, Vizhinjam, located at the extreme south-western tip of South Asia, served as an important port throughout the history of the region. The location is economically and geopolitically significant as a key point connecting the shipping between Southeast Asia and the Middle East.

== Trivandrum International Deepwater Container Transhipment Port in Vizhinjam ==
An international deepwater container transhipment port (ICTP) at Vizhinjam was conceived as early as 1991. In August 2015, the Kerala government and Adani Vizhinjam Port (AVPL), representing the Adani Group, signed the agreement for the Adani Vizhinjam project. AVPL was the only bidder for the project.

As per the details of the agreement, Adani Group is free to operate the Vizhinjam port for 40 years (extendable by 20 more years). The Kerala state government will start getting a portion of the revenue from the port after 15 years. The project also includes 360 acres of land (of which around 36% are reclaimed from the sea) and a railway line (around 10 km long). The deadline for the commission of Phase I, Adani Vizhinjam Port was fixed on 4 December 2019 in the 2015 agreement.

The entire ICTP project was valued at around Rs. 75.25 billion. The AVPL had requested a Rs 16.35 billion grant for the project from the Kerala state government.

The project commenced on 5 December 2015. AVPL had announced that the "first ship will berth at Vizhinjam" on 1 September 2018 (the 1,000 days target). The AVPL is currently seeking an extension of the Phase I commission deadline to October 2020 from the Kerala government.

As per a Reuters report, China had also wanted to partner with an un-named Indian company to build the port, but its overture was rejected by New Delhi on grounds of national security. It is speculated that the port will have berths for India's navy and coastguard.

As of November 2024, the port has started trails and handled over 1 lakh containers and 46 ships during the trial period in the last four months. Minister of ports V N Vasavan commended the achievement stating that "Vizhinjam Port is breaking records, handling 100,000+ TEUs (20-foot containers) and welcoming 46 ships in just four months! Kerala' ‘golden coast' is here, setting a new standard in global trade".

=== Public protests ===
There were large scale public protests against the controversial Adani controlled port in November 2022. Christian Priests led the protestors, who primarily belong to the dispossessed fishermen community.

=== Future ===
Karan Adani, managing director of Adani Ports, announced that the first phase of International Deepwater Contrainer Transhipment Port Thiruvananthapuram will finish by December 2024, with full completion expected by 2028-29.

The company, along with the Kerala state government, plans to invest a total of Rs 200 billion ($2.39 billion) in the port project. Adani Ports alone will contribute Rs 100 billion ($1.2 billion) towards the second phase.

== Transport ==
Nearest	Name	Distance
Airport	Trivandrum International Airport	15 kilometres (9.3 mi)
Railway station	Trivandrum South (TVCS)	8 kilometres (5.0 mi)
Seaport	Trivandrum International Deepwater Transhipment Port at Vizhinjam	6.9 kilometres (4.3 mi)

Regular buses operate in Vizhinjam from the City Bus Stand at East Fort, Trivandrum and as well as from the Central Bus Stand at Thampanoor, Trivandrum. Cabs can be also hired at the bus stations.

== See also ==
- Vizhinjam International Seaport Thiruvananthapuram
- Vizhinjam Rock Caves
