= Chermanangad =

Chermanangad Chiramanangad
- village
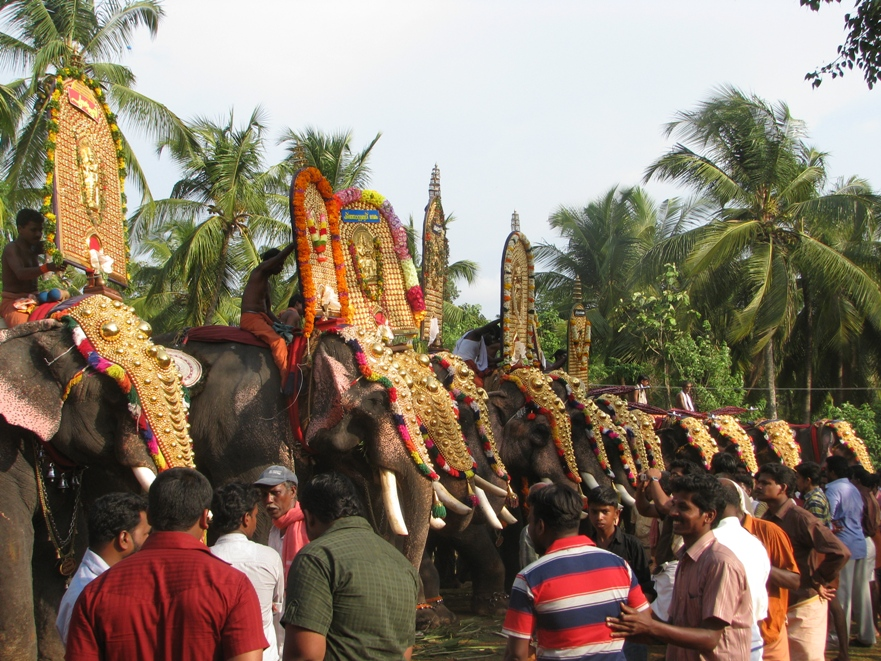
- Elephants lined up for Pooram
- Interactive map of Chermanangad
- Coordinates: 10°40′55″N 76°6′51″E
- Country: India
- State: Kerala
- District: Thrissur

Government
  - Body: Kadangode Panchayat, Vadakkanchery Block

Population (2011)
  - Total: 11,060

Languages
  - Official: Malayalam, English
- Time zone: UTC+5:30 (IST)
- PIN: 680604
- Telephone code: +914885
- Vehicle registration: KL-08
- Nearest city: Kunnamkulam, Trichur
- Civic agency: Kadangode Panchayat, Vadakkanchery Block

Chermanangad (also spelled Cheramanagad and Chiramanangad) is a town on the road between Kunnamkulam and Wadakanchery (Road No. SH50) in the Thrissur district of Kerala.

== History ==
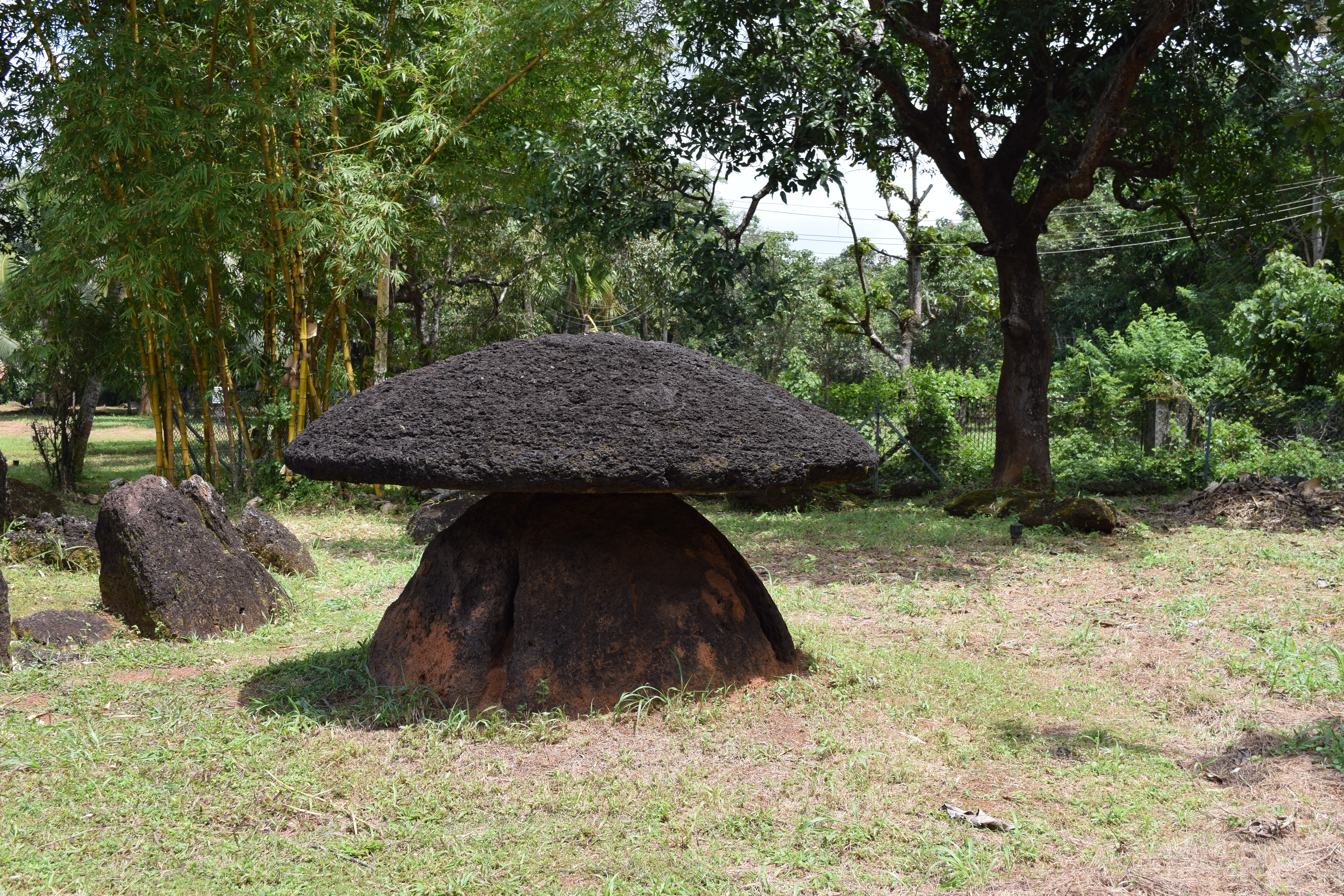
Kodakuthy Kallu, also known as Kudakallu, at Chiramanangad village.

Prehistoric burial sites, commonly known as Kodakuthy Kallu (Kudakallu) [literally meaning "stones shaped like umbrellas"], were discovered here. These burial sites had stones placed like umbrellas over them. These stones have been over a period of time been plundered for construction and the remaining stones shifted to museums.

These umbrella rocks of Chiramanangad are reported to have a history of over four thousand years; here people were buried in earthen urns and umbrella rocks were placed on top as landmarks.

== Economy ==
This largely rural area is gradually being converted to a small urban centre. Agricultural activity is disappearing with agricultural land being converted to housing plots. The village centre has a temple known as Kunnambathu Kavu.

== Festivals ==
Every year Pooram is held at the village temple grounds on the 10th day of the Malayalam month Medam, approximately mid-April in the Gregorian calendar.

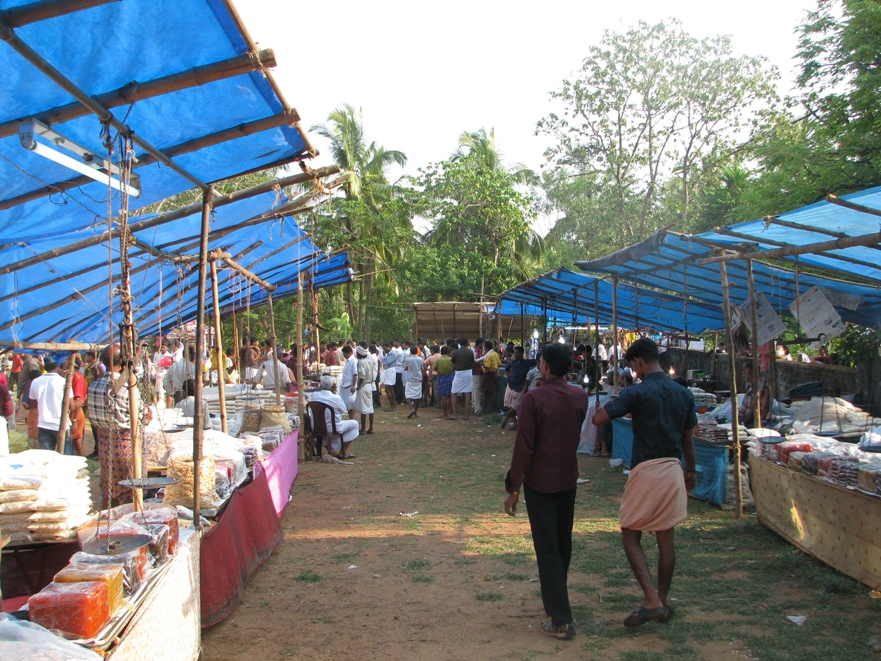
Stalls set up for Pooram

== Transportation ==
The nearest railway stations to Chiramanangad are in Thrissur and Wadakanchery.

The nearest major towns are Kunnamkulam and Guruvayur.

== Demographics ==
As of 2011 India census, Chiramanangad had a population of 11060 with 5293 males and 5767 females.
