= Kandanassery =

- village
- Location in Kerala, India Kandanassery (India)
- Coordinates: 10°36′0″N 76°5′0″E
- Country: India
- State: Kerala
- District: Thrissur

Population (2011)
  - Total: 14,645

Languages
  - Official: Malayalam, English
- Time zone: UTC+5:30 (IST)
- PIN: 680102
- Vehicle registration: KL-46
- Lok Sabha constituency: Thrissur
- Vidhan Sabha constituency: Manalur

Kandanassery is a village in Thrissur district in the state of Kerala, India.

Located between Guruvayoor and Choondal road, Kandanassery is a village known for its coconut tappers and agriculturalists. Kandanassery has borders with adjacent villages of Chowalloor, Mattom, Thaikkad, Nambazhakkad and Chowalloorpady.

Kandanassery has one government school up to Upper Primary, and 3 Anganvadis.

The famous temples in Kandanassery are Vazhavil Bhagvathi Kshethram, Chittikaattil Bhagavathy Kshethram, Muzhuvalangara Mahavishnu Temple & Kaluthipara Temple.

Kandanassery is the home of the industrialist M. P. Ramachandran, the chairman of Jyothi Laboratories. Many people of Kandanassery are NRIs working mostly in the Middle East.

The famous Malayalam author late Kovilan was born here, as well as the late film director Pavithran.

Noted Monuments with historic significance near Kandanassery are the Munimada, Kalluthipara and Kodakkal.

== Demographics ==
As of 2011 India census, Kandanassery had a population of 14,645 with 6,727 males and 7,918 females.
