= Chemmanthatta =

- village
- Location in Kerala, India Chemmanthatta (India)
- Coordinates: 10.6491700°N 76.101940°E
- Country: India
- State: Kerala
- District: Thrissur

Population (2011)
  - Total: 6,538

Languages
  - Official: Malayalam, English
- Time zone: UTC+5:30 (IST)
- PIN: 680501
- Telephone code: 04885
- Vehicle registration: KL-46
- Nearest city: Kunnamkulam
- Lok Sabha constituency: Alathur
- Vidhan Sabha constituency: Kunnamkulam

Chemmanthatta is a village located in the Thrissur district of Kerala, India, approximately 6 kilometers from Kunnamkulam town.

A notable landmark in Chemmanthatta is the Chemmanthatta Mahadeva Temple, a Hindu temple dedicated to Lord Shiva. According to local folklore, the temple's idol was installed by sage Parashurama, making it one of the 108 Shiva temples in Kerala.

The village is characterized by its vast paddy fields, contributing to its serene and picturesque landscape. Agriculture serves as the primary livelihood for many residents, reflecting the community's deep connection to traditional farming practices.

Geographically, Chemmanthatta is bordered by the villages of Eyyal and Choondal to the east, Kanipayyur and Chowannur to the west, Chowannur to the north, and Choondal and Kanipayyur to the south. The village falls under the administration of the Chowwannur gram panchayat and is part of the Kunnamkulam Vidhan Sabha constituency.

The official languages spoken in Chemmanthatta are Malayalam and English, reflecting the linguistic diversity of the region.

For administrative purposes, the village is managed by a local governing body, with the village office located in Puthussery, Choondal. The office can be contacted at 8547614637.

In summary, Chemmanthatta is a village that harmoniously blends cultural heritage with natural beauty, offering a glimpse into the traditional lifestyle of Kerala.

== Demographics ==
As of the 2011 census, it has a population of 6,538 residents, comprising 3,063 males and 3,475 females. The village boasts a high literacy rate of 95.62%, surpassing the state average of 94%.
