= Eyyal =

- Village
- Location in Kerala, India Eyyal (India)
- Coordinates: 10°39′0″N 76°7′0″E
- Country: India
- State: Kerala
- District: Thrissur

Population (2011)
  - Total: 6,727

Languages
  - Official: Malayalam, English
- Time zone: UTC+5:30 (IST)
- PIN: 680501
- Telephone Code: 04885
- Vehicle registration: KL48
- Nearest City: Kunnamkulam
- Lok Sabha Constituency: Alathur
- Vidhan Sabha Constituency: Kunnamkulam
- Website: eyyal.blogspot.com

Eyyal is a village in Thrissur District in the state of Kerala, India. Archeologists unearthed a collection of old Roman coins in 1946. These coins date from 123 BC to 117 AD. These coins are currently exhibited in the Archeological Museum of Thrissur.

== Population, religion, caste, working data ==
Eyyal is a Census Town situated in Kunnamkulam taluka of Thrissur district. As per the Population Census 2011, there are a total of 1,579 families residing in the Eyyal city. The total population of Eyyal is 6,727 out of which 3,097 are males and 3,630 are females; thus the Average Sex Ratio of Eyyal is 1,172.

The population of children aged 0–6 years in Eyyal city is 776 which is 12% of the total population. There are 383 male children and 393 female children between the ages of 0 and 6 years. Thus as per the Census 2011 the Child Sex Ratio of Eyyal is 1,026 which is less than the Average Sex Ratio (1,172).

As per the Census 2011, the literacy rate of Eyyal is 94.2%. Thus Eyyal has a lower literacy rate compared to 95.1% of Thrissur district. The male literacy rate is 84.3% and the female literacy rate is 82.6% in Eyyal.

- Population 6,727
- Literacy 94.2%
- Sex Ratio 1,172

Eyyal Census Town has total administration over 1,579 houses to which it supplies basic amenities like water and sewerage. It is also authorized to build roads within Census Town limits and impose taxes on properties coming under its jurisdiction.

=== Census Town ===
As per the Population Census 2011 data, the following are some quick facts about Eyyal Census Town.

	Total	Male	Female
Children	776	383	393
Literacy	94.2%	84.3%	82.6%
Scheduled Caste	906	443	463
Scheduled Tribe	4	1	3
Illiterate	1,118	485	633

== Caste-wise population ==
Schedule Caste (SC) constitutes 13.5% while Schedule Tribe (ST) were 0.1% of the total population in Eyyal.

	Total	Male	Female
Schedule Caste	906	443	463
Schedule Tribe	4	1	3

== Religion-wise population ==
Religion	Total		Male	Female
Hindu	4,245	(63.1%)	1,997	2,248
Muslim	1,904	(28.3%)	824	1,080
Christian	573	(8.52%)	275	298
Sikh	1	(0.01%)	0	1
Buddhist	1	(0.01%)	0	1
Jain	0	(0%)	0	0
Other Religion	0	(0%)	0	0
No Religion Specified	5	(0.04%)	2	4

== Literacy rate ==
The total literacy rate of Eyyal was 94.25% in 2011 which is greater than the average literacy rate 94% of Kerala. Population-wise, out of the total 5,609 literates, males were 2,612 while females were 2,997. Also the male literacy rate was 96.24% and the female literacy rate was 92.59% in Eyyal.

	Eyyal	Kerala
Female	92.59%	92.07%
Male	96.24%	96.11%
Total	94.25%	94%

== Sex ratio ==
The Sex Ratio of Eyyal is 1,172. Thus for every 1000 men there were 1,172 females in Eyyal. Also as per the Census, the Child Sex Ratio was 1,026 which is less than the Average Sex Ratio ( 1,172 ) of Eyyal.

== Child population ==
According to the Census 2011, there were 776 children between the ages of 0 and 6 years in Eyyal. Out of which 383 were male while 393 were female.

== Working population ==
In Eyyal Census Town out of the total population, 2,417 were engaged in work activities. 82% of workers describe their work as Main Work (Employment or Earning more than 6 Months) while 18% were involved in Marginal activity providing livelihood for less than 6 months. Of 2,417 workers engaged in Main Work, 142 were cultivators (owner or co-owner) while 119 were agricultural labourers.

	Total	Male	Female
Main Workers	1,981	1,500	481
Cultivators	142	112	30
Agriculture Labourer	119	70	49
Household Industries	39	27	12
Other Workers	1,681	1,291	390
Marginal Workers	436	222	214
Non Working	4,310	1,375	2,935

=== Wards ===
A ward is a local authority area, typically used for electoral purposes. Eyyal is further divided into 1 ward where elections are held every 5 years.

#	Ward	Population	Literacy	Sex Ratio
1	Ward No - 1	6,727	83.4%	1,172
