= Edayattoor =

Village in Kerala, India

Edayattoor is a small village in Annamanada panchayat, Thrissur District, Kerala state in India.

This village is located on Annamanada Mala Road, just 2 km from Annamanada bus station. Neighboring villages of Edayatttoor are: Annamanada (to the east), Meladoor (to the west), Kumbidi (to the south), and Vennur (to the north).
