= Vennur =

- village
- Location in Kerala, India Vennur (India)
- Coordinates: 10°38′0″N 76°24′0″E
- Country: India
- State: Kerala
- District: Thrissur
- Talukas: Talappilly

Languages
  - Official: Malayalam, English
- Time zone: UTC+5:30 (IST)
- PIN: 6XXXXX
- Vehicle registration: KL-
- Nearest city: Thrissur

Vennur is a village in Pazhayannur Gram Panchayat Thrissur district in the state of Kerala, India.
