= List of tourist attractions in Kozhikode =

This is a list of places of interest and historical significance in Kozhikode (Calicut).

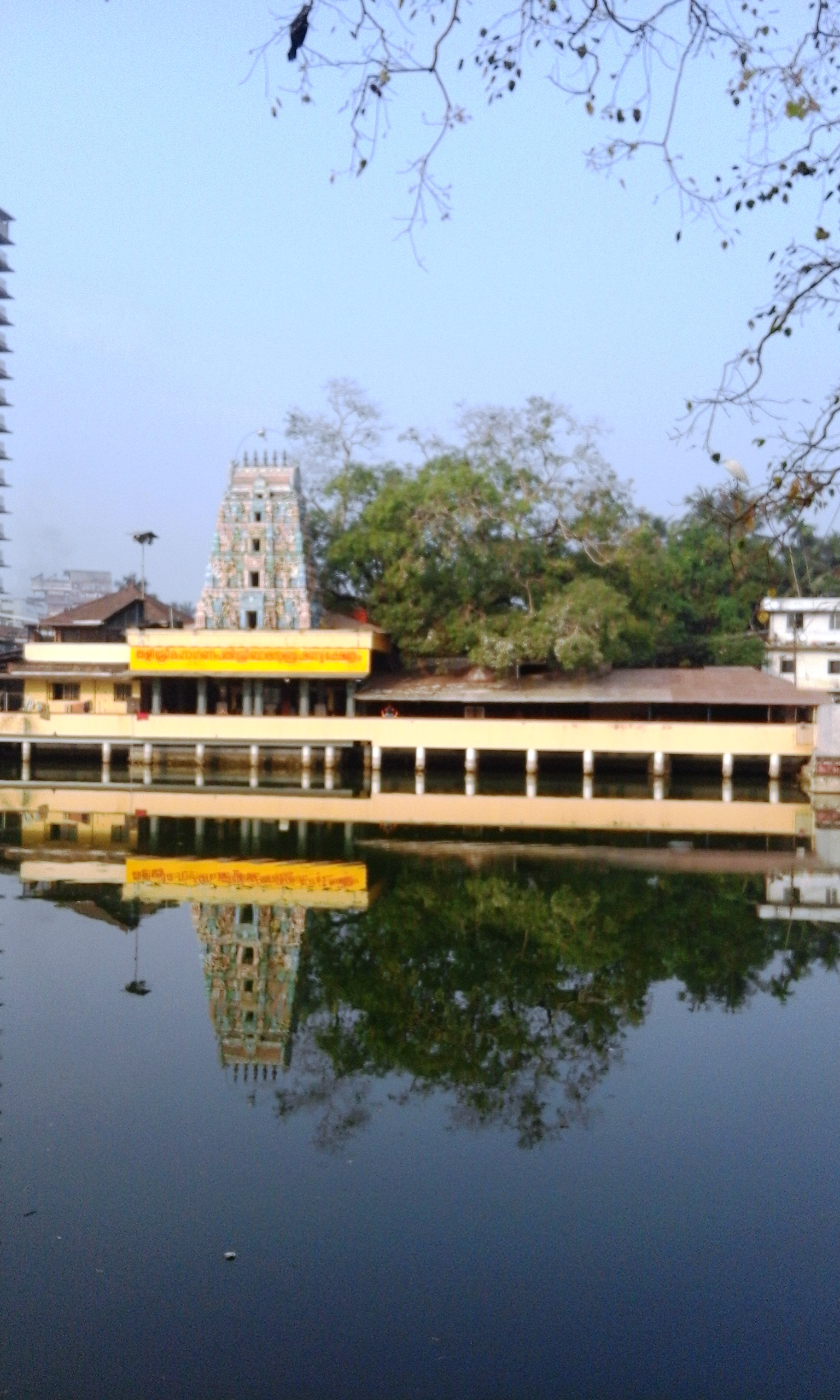
Thali Subramanya Temple

== Kozhikode Beach ==
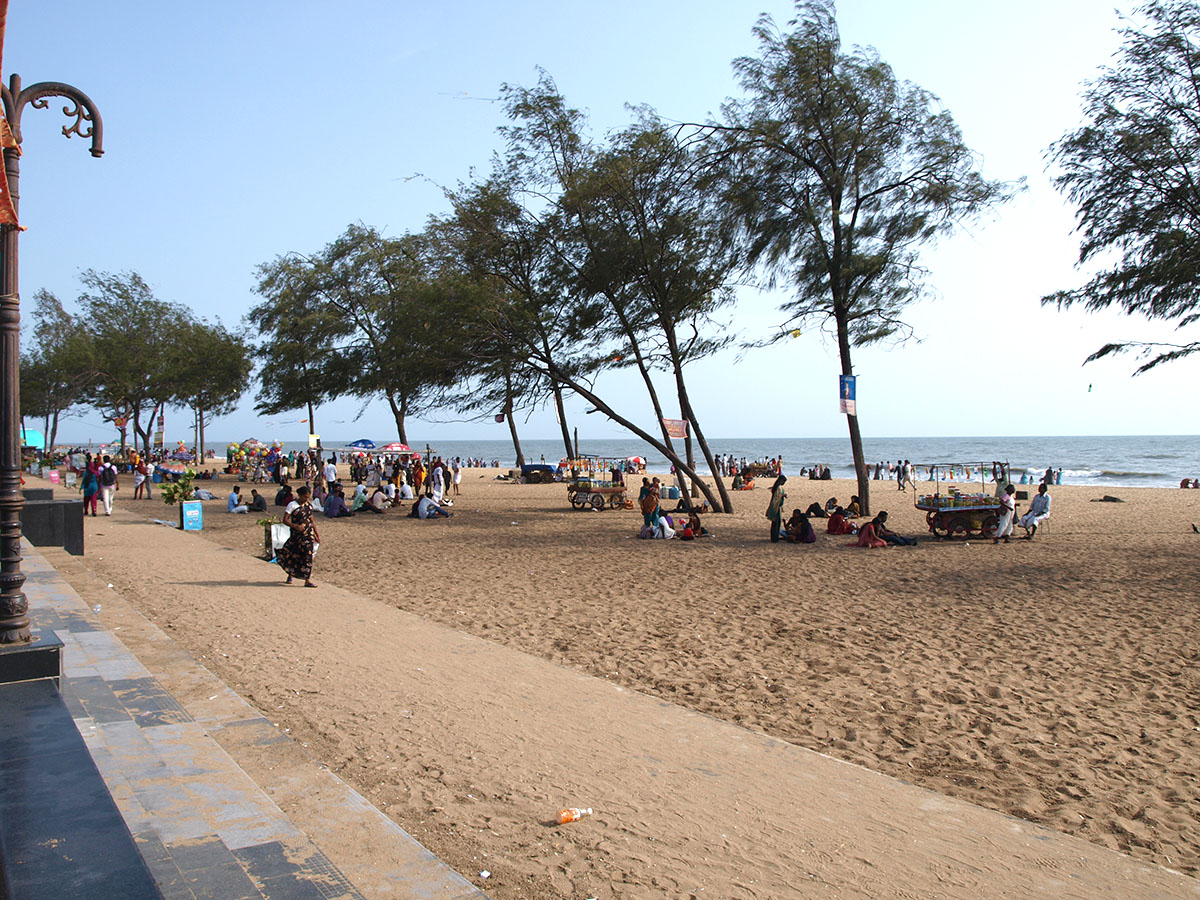

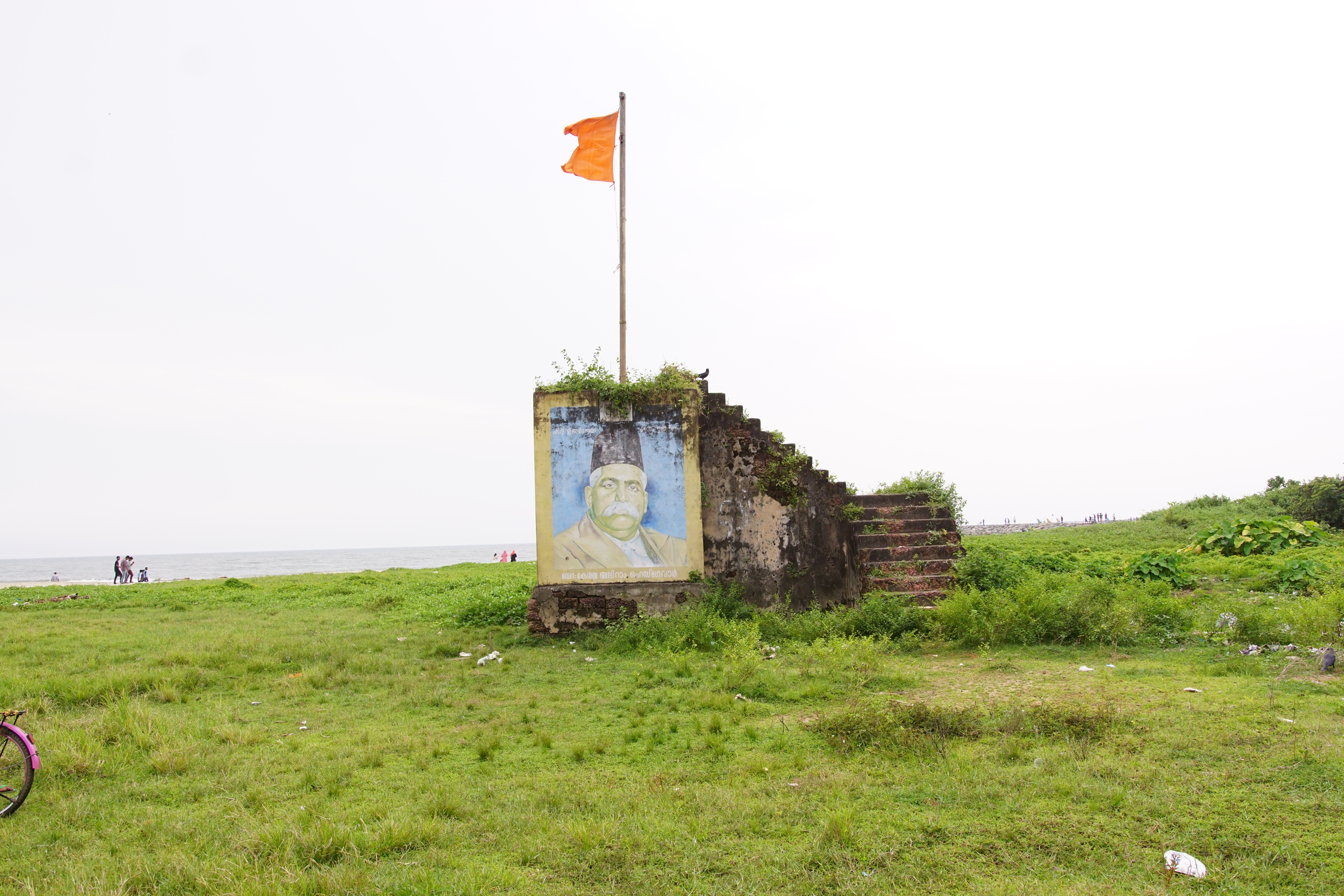

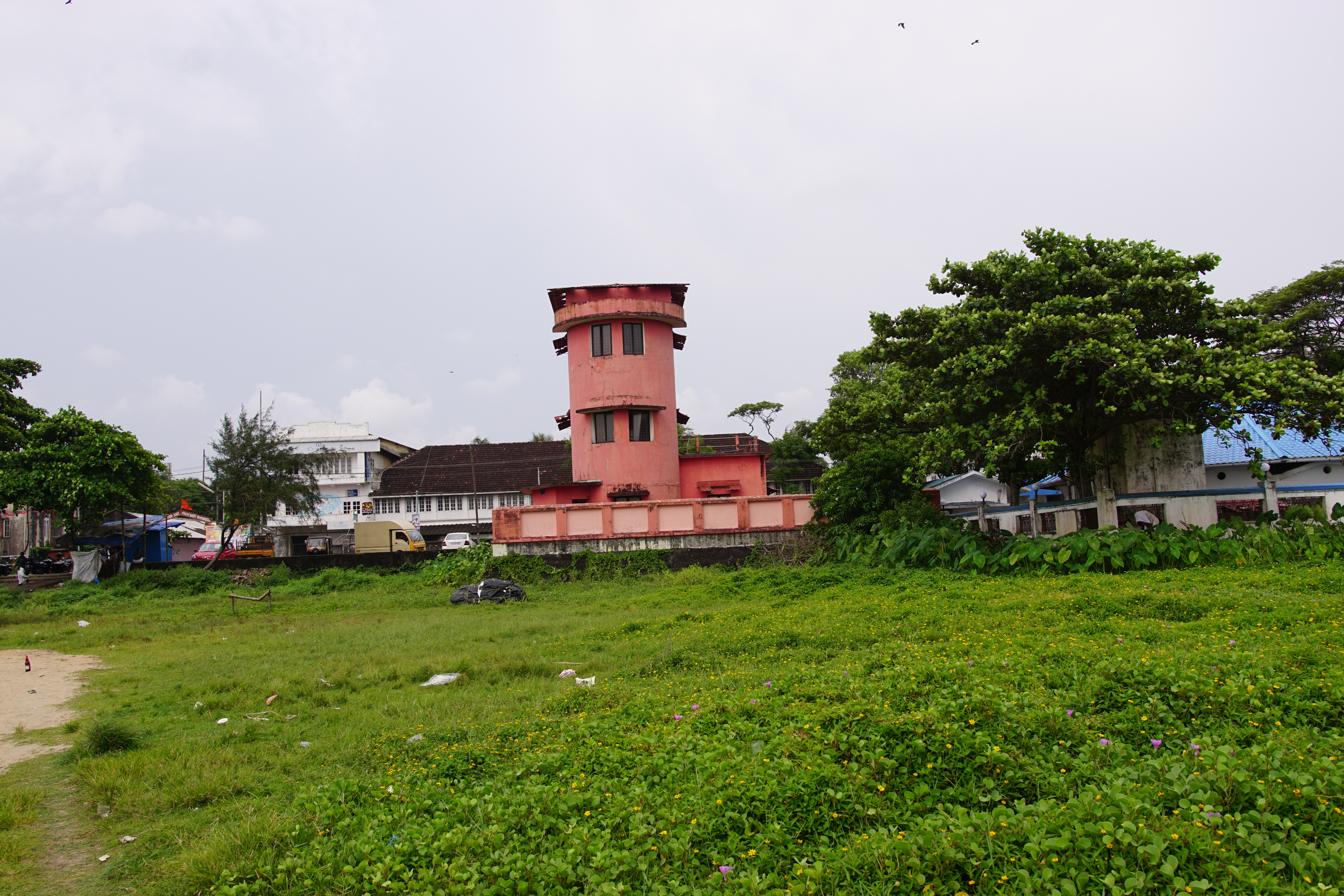

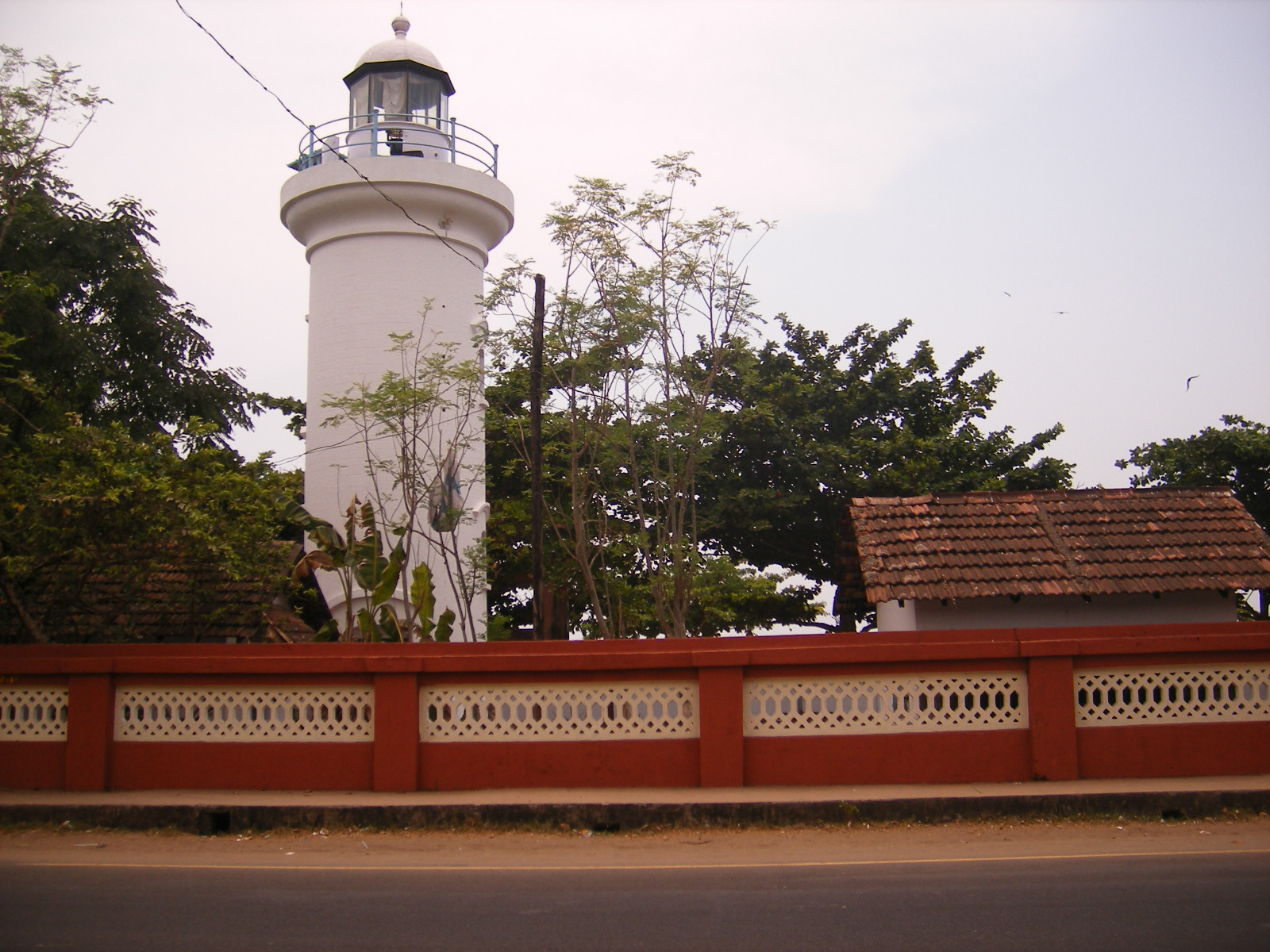

Kozhikode Beach is a highly popular retreat for locals. The beach has historical significance; Uddanda, a Sanskrit poet in the Zamorin's court, highlighted its prominence in his Kokila Sandeśa, writing that the ocean, "seeing that his daughter [goddess of riches] has settled down in Kukkatakroda [Kozhikode], is embracing the place, presenting it with a shipful of jewels". In modern history, the beach served as a prominent venue for political rallies, where national leaders such as Mahatma Gandhi, Khan Abdul Ghaffar Khan, Indira Gandhi and Krishna Menon delivered addresses. Following Mahatma Gandhi's visit in January 1934, "Beach Road" - originally known as Evan's Road - was renamed "Gandhi Road". Today, two dilapidated piers extend into the sea, recalling the area's maritime history. Built in 1871, the northern 'Iron Screw-pile' pier was 400 ft long (120 m) and featured a 'T'-shaped end. Numerous cranes on these piers once loaded spices and other goods destined for foreign ports.

== Vallyaangadi (big bazaar) ==
Vallyaangadi is a centuries-old market that continues to serve as one of the city's primary commercial centers. Merchants and accountants there still use a unique finger-code system for trading – a practice first documented by Ma Huan of Zheng He's fleet in 1403. According to local legend, the market's prosperity dates back to Mangat Achan, the chief secretary of the Zamorin, who manifested the goddess of wealth, Lakshmi, through long penance. He secured a promise to wait for his return, but he then went home and committed suicide to ensure she would never leave. Bound by her oath, Lakshmi remained permanently in Vallyaangadi, blessing the market with enduring prosperity.

== Mananchira and nearby institutions ==
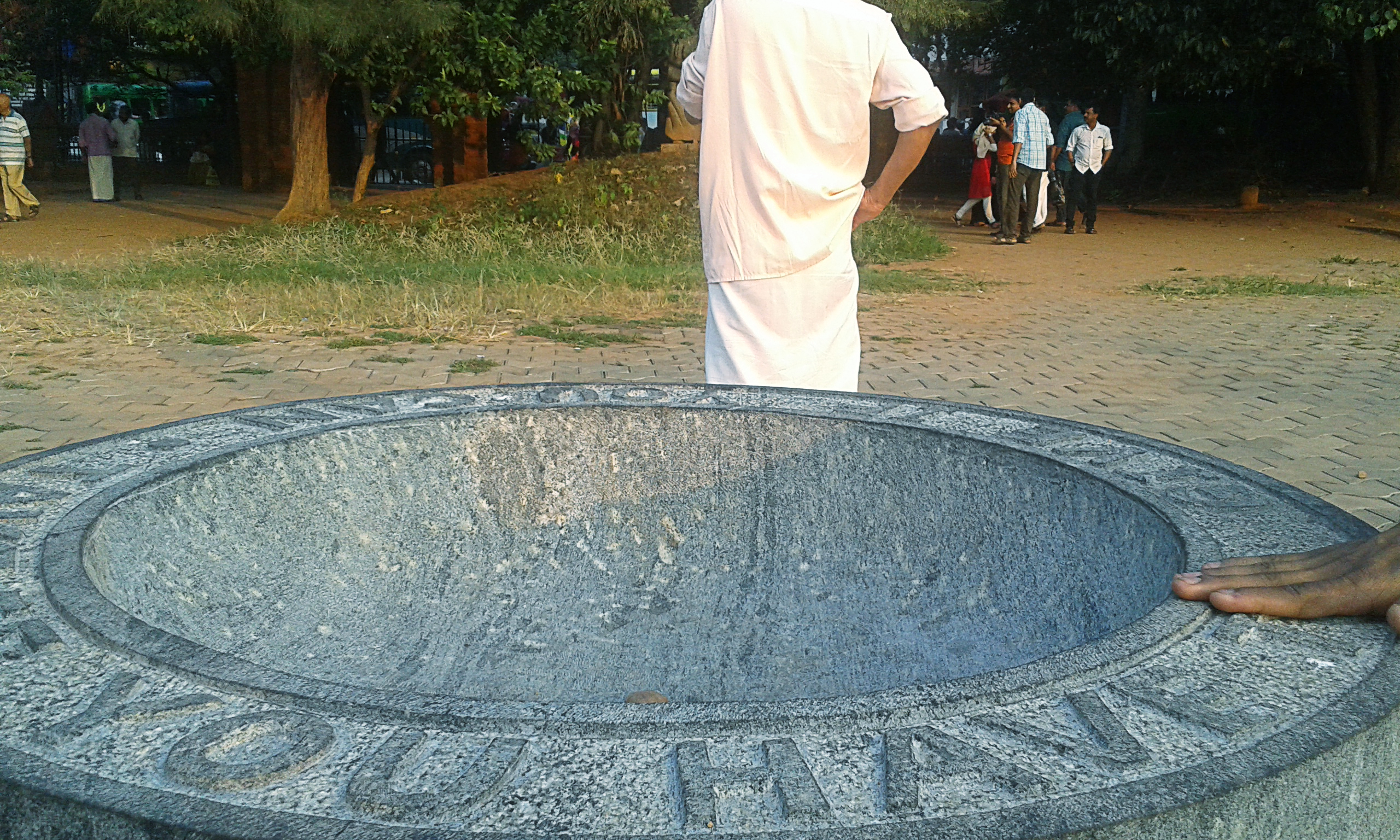
A sculpture by Jacek Tylicki: "Give If You Can - Take If You Have To"

Mananchira is a large water tank located in the heart of the city. Originally known as Mana Vikraman Tank, it historically served as the primary drinking water source for the Zamorin's palace complex. Today, several prominent civic and historic institutions surround the tank. The town hall, constructed in 1891 by local salt merchants, served as a significant venue for numerous public demonstrations and ceremonies during the freedom movement and in the decades that followed. The Pattalapalli or 'Military Mosque', was originally built to serve the Mysore soldiers stationed there during the 18th-century invasions of the region. Once the main courtyard of the palace, the Mananchira Ground along with the older Ansari Park, has been transformed into a public park known as 'Mananchira Square'.

== S.M. Street ==
S.M. Street is a prominent commercial lane located immediately north of Mananchira Square. The abbreviation stands for Sweetmeat Street, a name believed to originate from a local confection known as 'Halwa', which European traders referred to as sweetmeat. Like the lanes of Vallyaangadi, S.M. Street is roughly 600 years old and was most likely settled by Gujarati sweet manufacturers who established both their residences and shops here. Reflecting the area's diverse history, a now-abandoned 17th-century Parsi cemetery called Anjuman is also located here, a landmark famously documented in William Logan's Malabar.

== Sarovaram Biopark ==
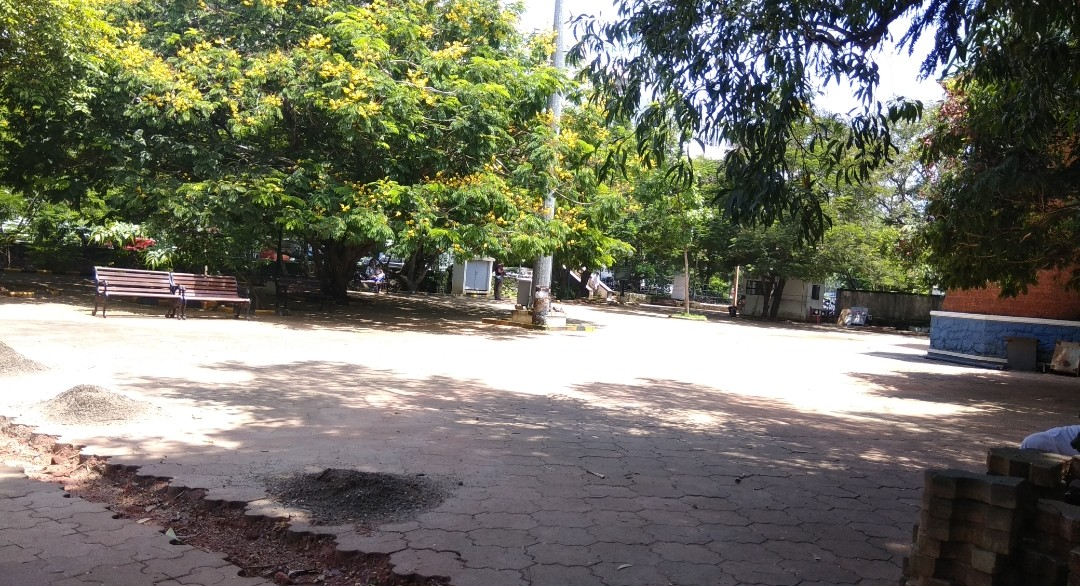
View inside the Sarovaram Bio Park

Sarovaram is an eco-friendly bio-park located in Kozhikode city. The project focuses on preserving local wetlands through eco-tourism initiatives. It is one of 27 wetlands of national importance identified by the Government of India for protection under National Wetland Conservation Program. The wetlands are rich in biodiversity, hosting 7 mangrove species, 29 mangrove-associated plants, and wildlife ranging from protozoa to otters. The park serves as a welcoming habitat for 9 types for land birds and 25 varieties for waterfowl and wetland birds, including species specifically adapted to waterlogged reeds. A 11 km long canal connects Korapuzha and Kallayi rivers, bringing in a periodic influx of saltwater that creates an environment ideal for mangroves, fish and other local biota.

== Tali Siva Temple ==
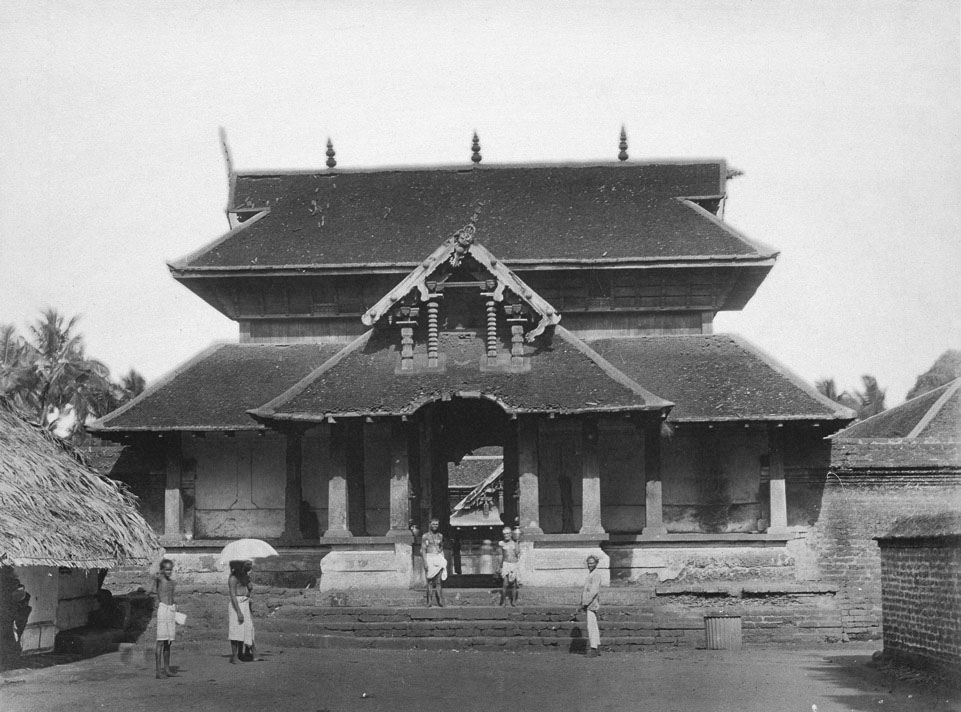
Tali Siva temple, circa 1900

The Tali Siva temple was one of the two Brahmanical royal temples patronized by the Zamorin (the other being the Valayanaattu Kavu) and to this day remains one of the most important spiritual and cultural centres in Kozhikode. The temple's date of origin is uncertain but was most likely built during the foundation of the city itself in the 12th century or before. The temple is surrounded by gigantic walls of 'elephant belly' (aana palla) type with broad base and narrower neck at the top. One of the two tanks attached to the temple can be seen to the right. The temple hosts the annual 'competition for scholars' called Revathi Pattathanam attended by eminent scholars and philosophers of Bharatiya Mimamsa, Prabhakara Mimamsa, Vedanta Mimamsa and Vyakarana. The temple was also the site for the famous anti-caste agitation of 1911 organized by Krishna Vakil (editor of Mithavadi) and advocate Manjeri Rama Ayyar for the rights of 'low-caste' people to use the road between the tank and the temple.

== Mishkal Mosque ==
Mishkal Mosque is one of the oldest mosques in Kerala. The Mosque was built by an Arab merchant, Nakhooda Mishkal, nearly 650 years ago. It is named Mishkal Mosque after him. It is located in Kuttichira, a part of Thekkepuram region in Kozhikode city. In 1510, the mosque was partially burned in a Portuguese attack. The top floors of the mosque still display some of that damage. Mishkal Mosque originally had five stories. It was reconstructed after the fire in 1510 and now has four stories. Typical for similarly aged mosques of the region, it has no cupolas and minarets and heavily employs timber. According to some historians, Kerala's temple architecture influenced the architecture of old mosques in Kerala which have gopuram-style entrance arches and no minarets.

== Panniyankara Bhagavati Temple ==
The Bhagavaty temple on a hillock on the southern side of Kallayi river is one of the two pre-Calicut temples known to historians, built at least two centuries before the foundation of the city. This area must have come under the territory of Porlathiri during the reign of Ceraman Perumal. It is a typical Chera period structure with a square garbhagriha and mandapa and probably had a currambalam and prakara (outer walls) that are no more. Two granite slabs dating to the 10–11th century AD were recovered recently carrying three inscriptions in Vattezhuthu, an old Malayalam language. One is a record of a land grant of the Chera king Ravi Kota, who was crowned in 1021 AD. Mentioned in the inscription are functionaries like Adhikarar (officials), Alkoyil (king's representative) and Poduval (temple secretary) and avirodham (a system of unanimous resolution), kalam (an old measure), etc. The second inscription dating back to 883–913 AD records a decision by the Taliyar and Tali Adhikarikal of 'Panriyankarai' to conduct seven Tiruvakkiram (sacred feast) at the shrine of Patari (female deity). The third inscription records a unanimous decision to transfer some land belonging to the daughter of the Chief Queen of Cheraman Perumal for the conduct of Tiru amritu (sacred feast).

== Thiruvannur Siva Temple ==
This Siva temple has an apsidal garbhagriha, decorated with typical Chola pillars and pilasters, panjaras and vyalimukhas. The central shrine has escaped any repair or change and is relatively well preserved. An inscription unearthed records a land grant given to Tirumannur Patarakar in the eighth regnal year of Raja Raja Chola. The record has been dated to 1044 AD. The deity appears to have been a Jain Tirthankara (since the rules of Thirukkunavaye, the premier Jain shrine of Kerala in Kodungalloor, are cited in the punitive clauses). The Jain temple must have been converted into a Siva temples sometime in the 11th century before the arrival of the Zamorins. The apsidal shrine and other features are attributable to this period.

== Kappad Beach ==
Vasco da Gama landed here at Kappad in 1498

Kappad (Kappakkadavu) Beach is located 16 km to the north of Kozhikode along the Kannur road at Pookkad. It is the site where Vasco Da Gama landed on 27 May 1498 with three vessels and 170 men. A monument erected here commemorates this event.

== Beypore ==
Beypore is a small port town situated 10 km south of Kozhikode at the mouth of Chaliyar river. Beypore is known for its ancient shipbuilding industry that constructed the Uru, trading vessels more popular during the medieval periods and still used by the Arabs and others for commerce and tours. The place was formerly known as Vaypura and Vadaparappanad. Tippu Sultan named the town "Sultan Pattanam". It is one of the important ports of Kerala and has been a major trading centre for 1.061centuries. The dilapidated Kovilakam (palace) of the Parappanad Rajas and a small Basheer Museum (former house of the writer Vaikom Muhammad Basheer) can be found here. Towards the sea shore is a big complex that includes a port, a boat yard, a fish landing platform, breakwater project, marine ware shop, ship- breaking unit, etc. There are two man-made extensions to the sea to facilitate easy access for fishing boats. The 2 km breakwater made of stone is another attraction. The Beypore Lighthouse is located to the south of the Chaliyar. The Marine Cemetery, an awareness monument dedicated to endangered fish species, is located at the Beypore beach.

== Thusharagiri Falls ==
Thusharagiri Falls is a waterfall in Chembukadavu. Thusharagiri offers endless scope for trekking, rock climbing and wildlife sanctuary visits. It is around 50 kilometres (31 mi) from Kozhikode. The nearest town Kodencherry is around 11 kilometres (6.8 mi) from Thusharagiri. The other main towns situated here are Thiruvambady and Thamarassery.

== Kunjali Marakkar Memorial ==
The Marakkars were admirals of the Zamorins, who valiantly resisted the Portuguese on the high seas. Kunhali Marakkar built a fort on the southern bank of the Moorad river. This fort was completely destroyed by the Portuguese at a later time. The place where the fort stood is known today as Kottakkal, 46 km south of Kozhikode. A small hut that belonged to Kunhali Marakkar with collections of ancient swords, cannonballs and knives can be seen here.

== Sand banks ==
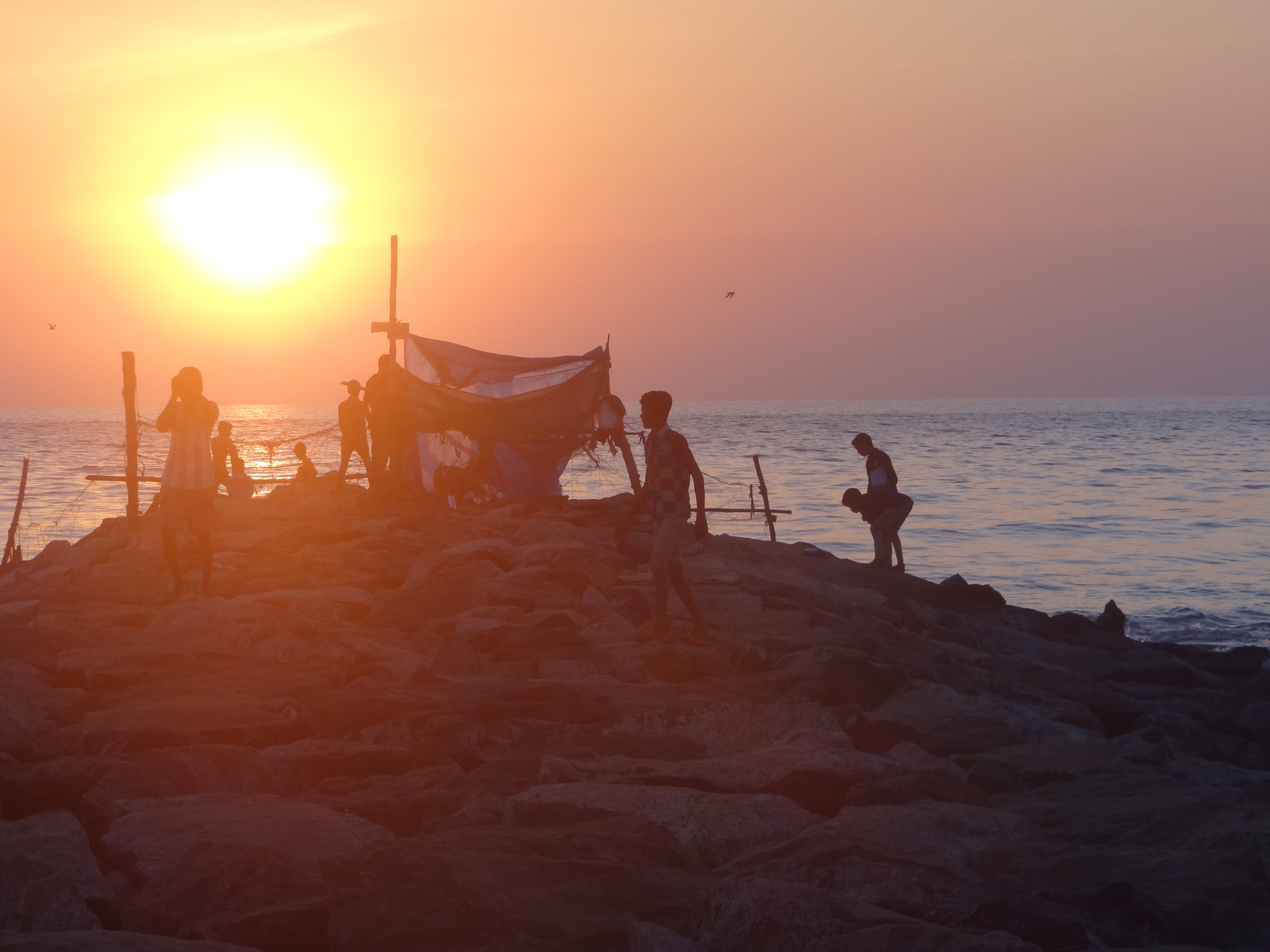
Vatakara Sand Banks

A small peninsula with the Moorad river on the east and the Arabian Sea on the west is located approximately 3 km towards the south of the town. This area is known as the Sandbanks. It is a well-known viewpoint.

== Craft Village ==
Sargaalaya, the art & craft village at Iringal is designed as an initiative to put Kerala's traditional arts & crafts on the tourism trail. The craft village is set up on 20 acres of land on the banks of the Moorad River, just 200 meters off Kozhikode – Kannur National Highway near Vatakara. The craft village has 27 cottages where a hundred or more artisans can work. Apart from showcasing crafts & craftsmen from across Kerala, Sargaalaya has a Crafts Design & Technology development centre that provides training for craftsmen on the latest techniques of production & encourages innovation in the traditional system.
