= Maikave =

Maikavu, മൈക്കാവ്
- Village
- Maikavu
- Location in Kerala, India Maikavu (India)
- Coordinates: 11.403008°N 75.976821°E
- Country: India
- State: Kerala
- District: Kozhikode District

Languages
  - Official: Malayalam, English
- Time zone: UTC+5:30 (IST)

Maikave is a village in the Kozhikode district of Northern Kerala (Malabar), on average 4.1m above sea level and near a river. It is located near Thamarassery (about 7 km away). Maikave is a scenic little town due to its proximity to mountainous areas to the east. The nearest towns are Kodenchery, Thamarassery, Koodathai and Velamcode.

== Village ==
Agriculture is the primary source of income in the area (rubber, arecanut, pepper and coconuts). The village has schools (St. Mary's H.S., Koodathai & St. Georges H.S. Velamcode).

The famous St. Mary's Orthodox Church, Maikavu, St. Mary's Jacobite Syrian Church, Maikave and St. George Malankara Catholic Church are located here. Vattal Kurishu Palli is one of the major pilgrim centers.

== Climate ==
Maikave has a humid climate with a very hot season extending from March to May. The main rainy season is during South West Monsoon, which starts in the first week of June and runs up to September. The North East Monsoon runs from the second half of October through to November. The average annual rainfall is 3266 mm. The best weather is found towards the end of the year, in December and January.

== Festivals ==
- Onam is the most famous festival of Kerala. It falls in the Malayalam month of Chingam (Aug-Sept). It is the harvest festival of Kerala.
- Christmas
- പള്ളിപ്പെരുന്നാള്] (Feast of St.Mary) is the local village festival, held on 14 January (ബാവ പള്ളിയില്) and 15 (മെത്രാന് പള്ളിയില്).
- Easter
