= Chembukkadavu Weir =

Diversion dam in Kerala, India

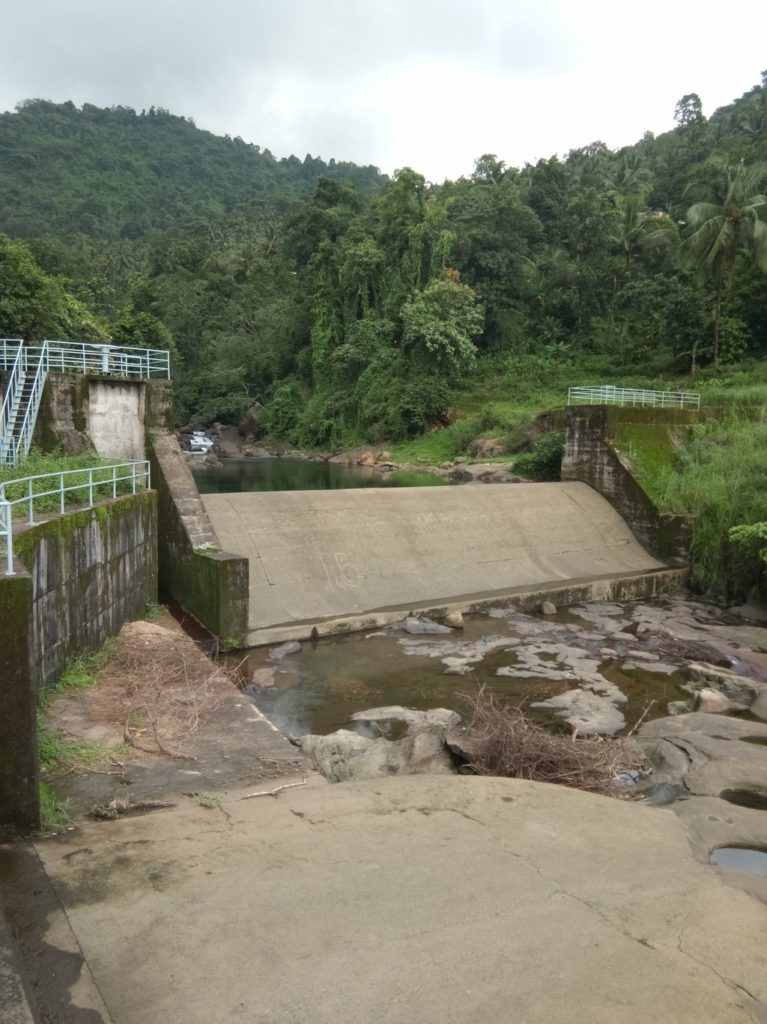
- Chempukadavu Barrage

- Location within Kerala
- Interactive map of Chembukkadavu Weir
- Country: India
- Location: Kerala
- Coordinates: 11°28′13.5″N 76°2′46.9″E
- Purpose: Power
- Status: Operational
- Opening date: 2003
- Operator: Kerala State Electricity Board

Dam and spillways
- Type of dam: Diversion dam
- Impounds: Chalipuzha
- Height (foundation): 6.5 metres (21 ft)
- Length: 35.5 metres (116 ft)
- Elevation at crest: 302.9 metres (994 ft)
- Spillways: 0

Reservoir
- Catchment area: 20.5 square kilometres (7.9 sq mi)
- Maximum water depth: 302.9 metres (994 ft)

Power Station
- Turbines: 3
- Installed capacity: 2.7 megawatts (3,600 hp)
- Annual generation: 6.59 gigawatt-hours (23.7 TJ)

Chembukkadavu Weir is a small diversion dam constructed across Chalipuzha in Kodenchery village of Kozhikode district in Kerala, India. The location of the scheme is at Chembukadavu near Tusharagiri in Kodencherry village of Kozhikode district. It is 55 km away from Kozhikode town. The weir is constructed across Chalipuzha river. After power generation, water from the power station is utilised for Chembukadavu II. The Power generated in the station is at 6.3 kV. This is stepped up to 33 kV and transmitted to 110 kV substation, Agasthyamoozhy. The weir and the power house is operated and maintained by Kerala State Electricity Board.

== Specifications ==
- LocationLatitude:11⁰28’13.5”N
- Longitude:76⁰2’46.9”E
- Panchayath : Kodenchery
- Village : Kodenchery
- District : Kozhikode
- River Basin : Chaliyar
- River : Chalipuzha
- Release from Dam to river : Chalipuzha
- Taluk through which release flows : Thamarassery
- Year of completion : 2003
- Name of Project : Kuttiady Augmentation Scheme
- Purpose of Project : Hydro Power

Kakkayam, PIN-673615 Phone.9446008466

- Installed capacity of the Project : 3×0.9(2.7MW)

Dam Features

- Type of Dam : RCC lining over a RR core structure
- Classification : Trench type diversion weir.
- Maximum Water Level (MWL) : EL 302.9 m
- Full Reservoir Level ( FRL) : EL 302.9 m
- Storage at FRL : Diversion only
- Height from deepest foundation : 6.5 m
- Length : 35.50 m
- Spillway : No spillway
- Crest Level : EL 302.9 m
- River Outlet : Nil
- Officers in charge & phone No. : Executive Engineer, KG Division,

== See also ==
- Chembukkadavu 2 Weir
