= Disposable product =

Product designed to be discarded after use

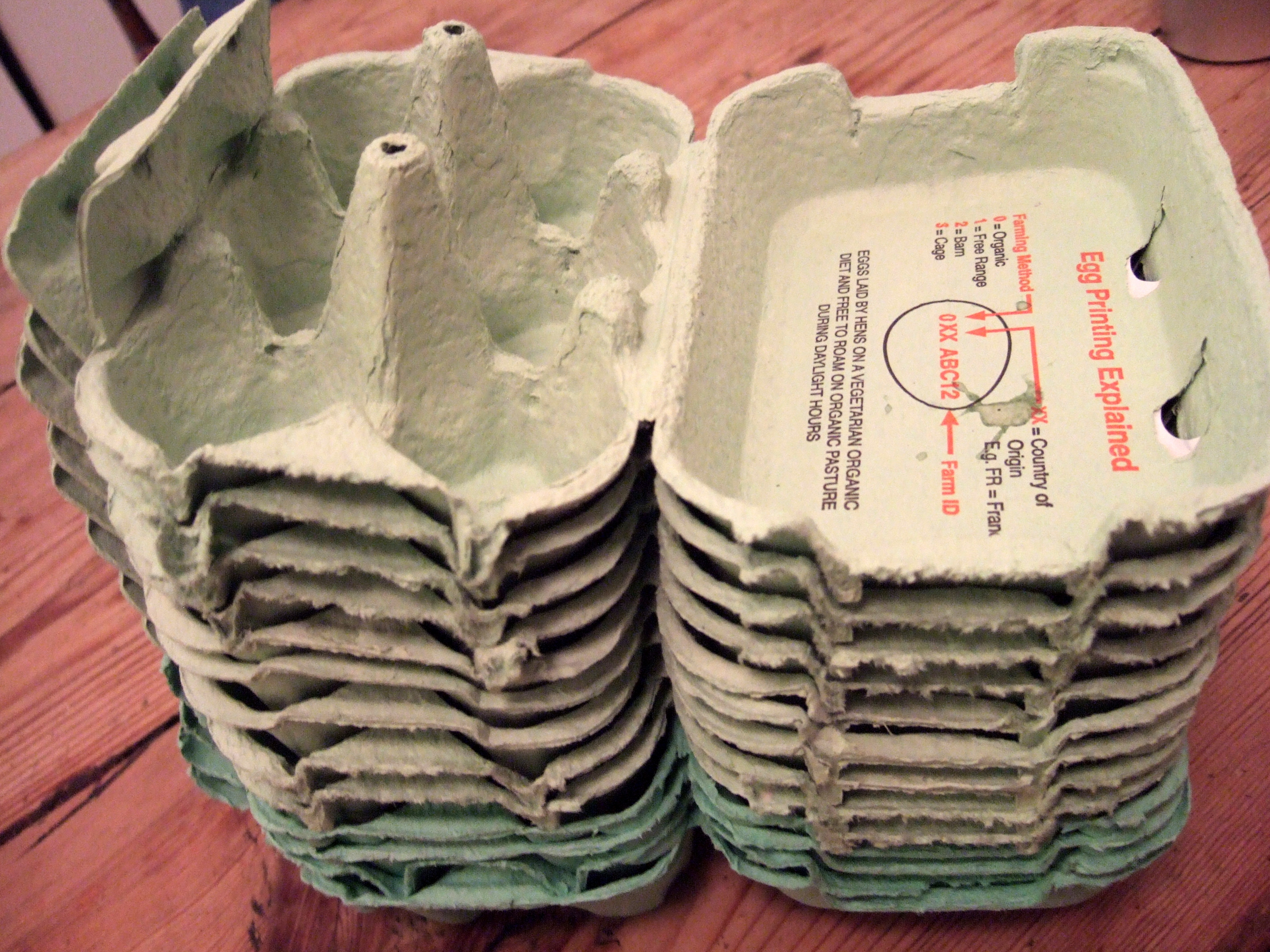
Disposable egg cartons made of molded pulp

A disposable (also called disposable product) is a product designed for a single use after which it is recycled or is disposed as solid waste. The term is also sometimes used for products that may last several months (e.g. disposable air filters) to distinguish from similar products that last indefinitely (e.g. washable air filters). The word "disposables" is not to be confused with the word "consumables", which is widely used in the mechanical world. For example, welders consider welding rods, tips, nozzles, gas, etc. to be "consumables", as they last only a certain amount of time before needing to be replaced. Consumables are needed for a process to take place, such as inks for printing and welding rods for welding, while disposable products are items that can be discarded after they become damaged or are no longer useful.

== Terminology ==
"Disposable" is an adjective that describes something as non-reusable but is disposed of after use. Many people now use the term as a noun or substantive, i.e. "a disposable" but in reality this is still an adjective as the noun (product, nappy, etc.) is implied.

The UK government included an enquiry about how best to define "single-use plastics" in its 2018 consultation document on "tackling the plastic problem".

== Materials ==
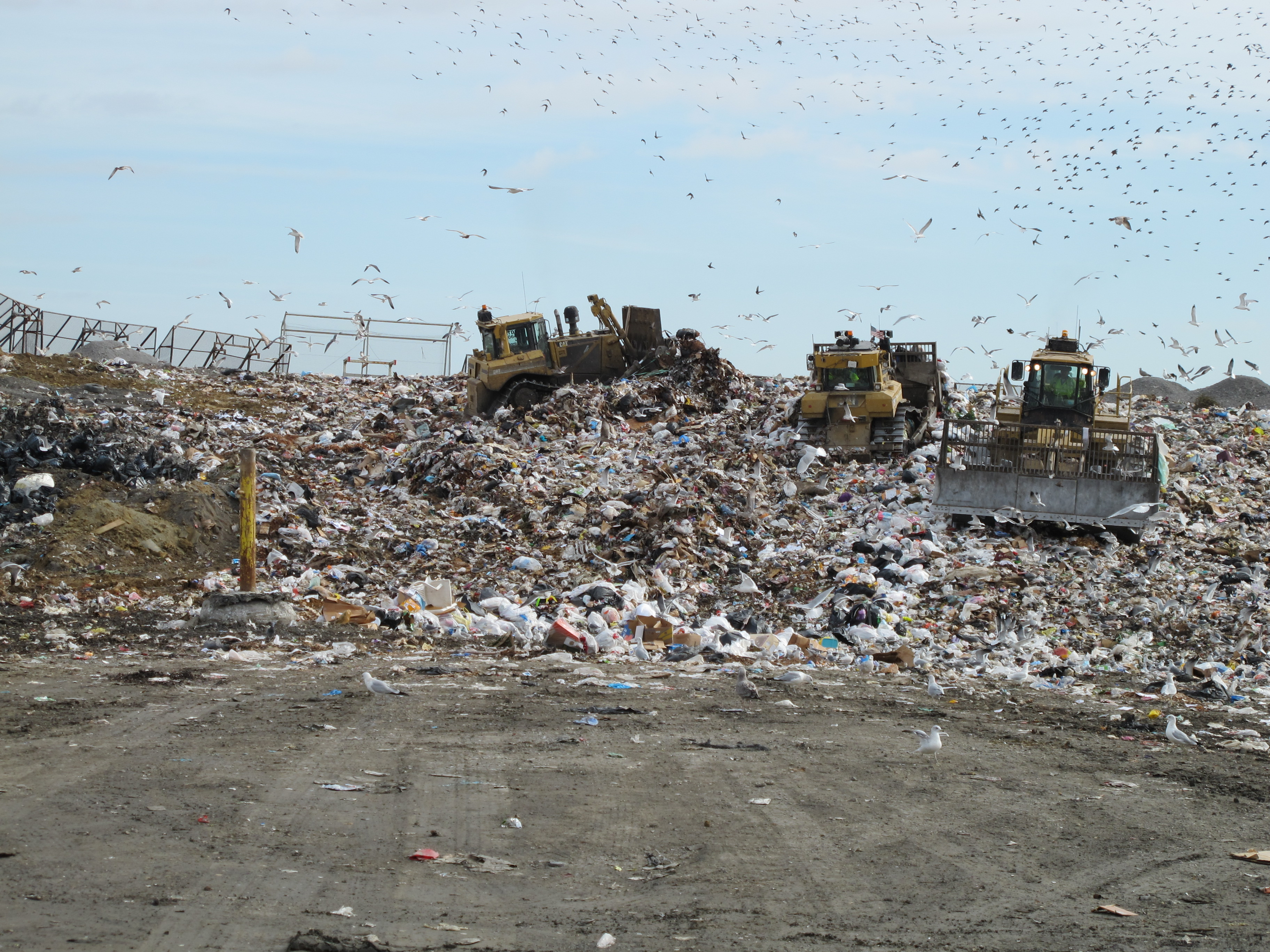
Landfill full of trash

Disposable products are most often made from paper, plastic, cotton, or polystyrene foam. Products made from composite materials such as laminations are difficult to recycle and are more likely to be disposed of at the end of their use. They are typically disposed of using landfills because it is a cheap option. However, in 2004, the European Union passed a law which stopped allowing disposals in landfills.

== Single-use plastics ==
Synthetic plastic products gained popularity during the first half of the twentieth century and was initially marketed as a superior, light but durable material compared to existing materials like glass and metal. However, the plastic industry switched their messaging and strategy in the 1950s. To boost revenue, the plastic industry shifted to producing cheap and expendable plastic, signified by Lloyd Stouffer, editor for Modern Packaging magazine, at the 1956 convention for the Society of the Plastics Industry said, "the future of plastic is in the trash can". The plastic industry, through multiple years of successful marketing campaign, established the norm of disposable, single-use plastic products over the previous norm of re-usability. In 1963, Stouffer commented "The happy day has arrived when nobody any longer considers the plastics package too good to throw away."

Many governments and communities are scaling up their efforts to phase out single-use plastic products and packaging and to manage plastic packaging waste in an environmentally sound manner.

Since 2011, the community-led campaign, Plastic Free July, has encouraged individuals, communities and organisations to refuse single-use plastics each July. Musician and UNEP Goodwill Ambassador, Jack Johnson has served as the campaign's international ambassador since 2018.

Another community-focused campaign is Greenpeace's A Million Acts of Blue. Since 2018, the initiative has aimed to empower local communities to pressure corporations to stop producing single-use plastics, urge governments to develop policy, and encourage individuals to reduce their use of single-use plastics.

In 2015, the European Union (EU) adopted a directive requiring a reduction in the consumption of single use plastic bags per person to 90 by 2019 and to 40 by 2025. In April 2019, the EU adopted a further directive banning almost all types of single use plastic, except bottles, from the beginning of the year 2021.

In the UK, a 2018 HM Treasury consultation on single-use plastic waste taxation noted that the production process for single-use plastic originates in the conversion of naturally occurring substances into polymers, which vary in their capacity for being re-processed on one or more occasions, meaning that some polymers can be reprocessed and reused only once, and others cannot at present be reprocessed in an economic manner and are therefore destined to have only a single use. The sale of single-use plastic cutlery, balloon sticks and polystyrene cups and food containers was banned in England from 1 October 2023, following an announcement on "some of the most polluting single-use plastic items" published in January 2023. At the same time, restrictions have been introduced concerning the supply of single-use plastic plates, trays and bowls.

The EU's Single-Use Plastic Directive (SUPD, Directive EU 2019/904) went into effect in EU member states on 3 July 2021.

Also in 2021, Australia's Minderoo Foundation produced a report called the "Plastic Waste Makers Index", which concluded that half of the world's single-use plastic waste is produced by just 20 companies. China is the biggest consumer of single-use plastics.A 2024 study based on a survey of 869 people across China found that saving money was the main motivation for reducing plastic use, and that policies and regulations also influenced people's behavior.

== Examples of disposables ==
=== Kitchen and dining products ===
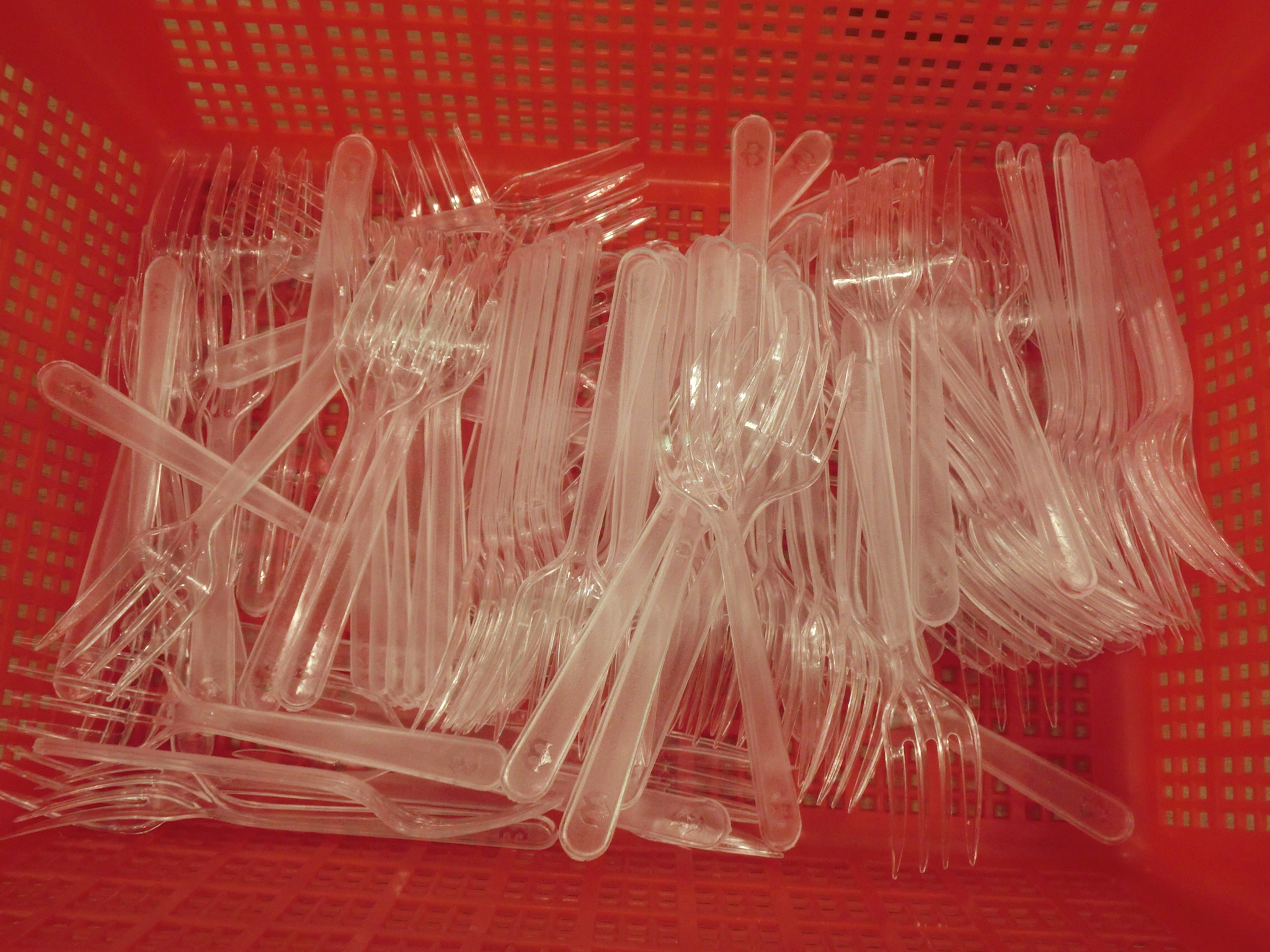
Disposable forks

- Aluminum foil and aluminum pans
- Disposable dishware / drinkware (e.g. plates, bowls, cups)
- Plastic cutlery (e.g. spoons, knives, forks, sporks)
- Disposable table cloths
- Cupcake wrappers, coffee filters are compostable
- Drinking straws
- Wet wipe

=== Packaging ===
Packages are usually intended for a single use. The waste hierarchy calls for minimization of materials. Many packages and materials are suited to recycling, although the actual recycling percentages are relatively low in many regions. For example, in Chile, only 1% of plastic is recycled. Reuse and repurposing of packaging is increasing, but eventually containers will be recycled, composted, incinerated, or landfilled.

There are many container forms such as boxes, bottles, jars, bags, etc. Materials used include paper, plastics, metals, fabrics, composites, etc.

A number of countries have adopted legislation to ensure that plastic packaging waste collected from households is sorted, reprocessed, compounded, and reused or recycled. There are also bans on single-use plastic food packaging in many countries.

=== Food service industry disposables ===
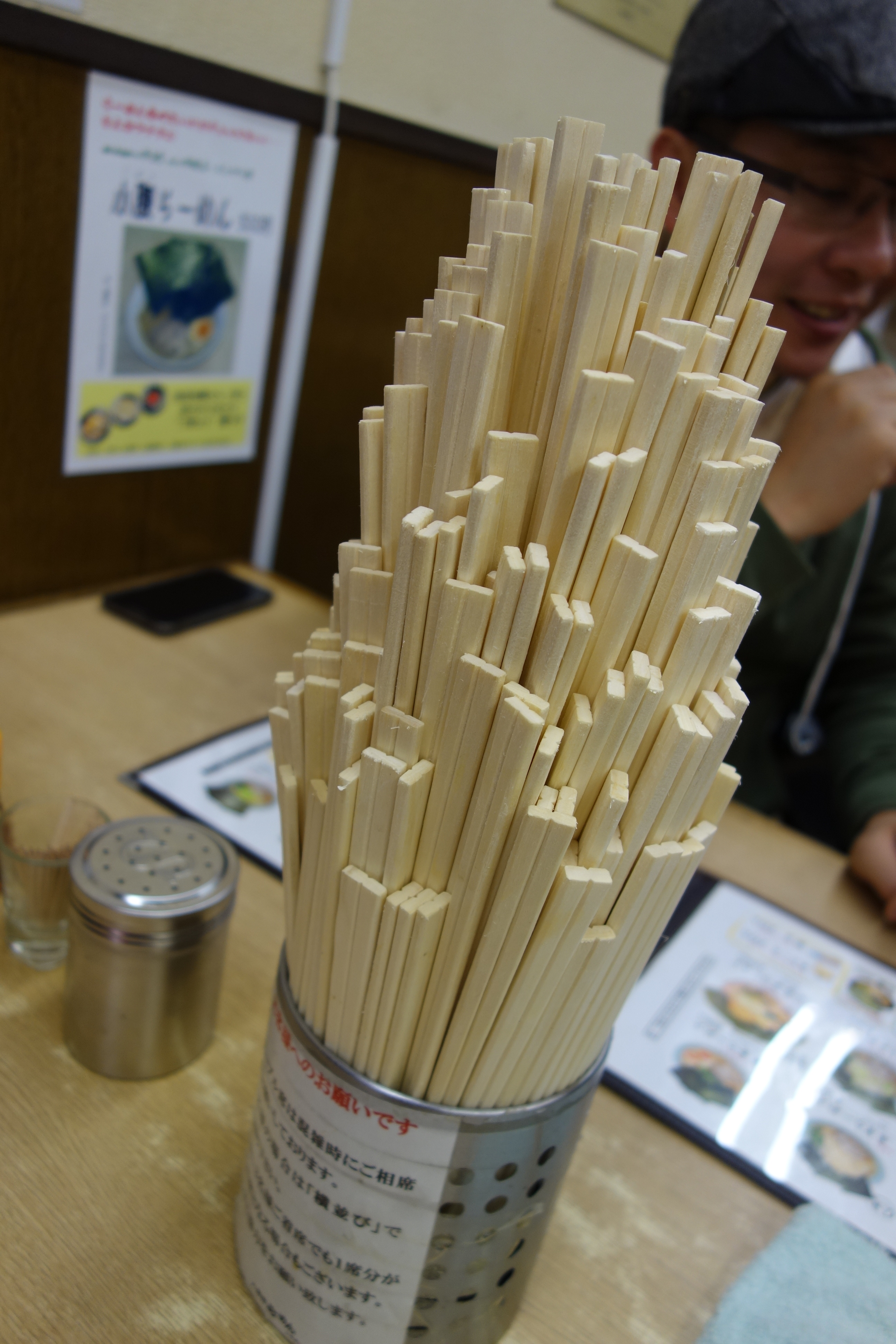
Disposable chopsticks

In 2002, Taiwan began taking action to reduce the use of disposable tableware at institutions and businesses, and to reduce the use of plastic bags. Yearly, the nation of 17.7 million people was producing 59,000 tons of disposable tableware waste and 105,000 tons of waste plastic bags, and increasing measures have been taken in the years since then to reduce the amount of waste. In 2013 Taiwan's Environmental Protection Administration (EPA) banned outright the use of disposable tableware in the nation's 968 schools, government agencies and hospitals. The ban was expected to eliminate 2,600 metric tons of waste yearly.

In Germany, Austria, and Switzerland, laws banning use of disposable food and drink containers at large-scale events have been enacted. Such a ban has been in place in Munich, Germany, since 1991, applying to all city facilities and events. This includes events of all sizes, including very large ones (Christmas market, Auer-Dult Faire, Oktoberfest and Munich Marathon). For small events of a few hundred people, the city has arranged for a corporation offer rental of crockery and dishwasher equipment. In part through this regulation, Munich reduced the waste generated by Oktoberfest, which attracts tens of thousands of people, from 11,000 metric tons in 1990 to 550 tons in 1999.

China produces about 57 billion pairs of single-use chopsticks yearly, of which half are exported. About 45 percent are made from trees – about 3.8 million of them – mainly cotton wood, birch, and spruce, the remainder being made from bamboo. Japan uses about 24 billion pairs of these disposables per year, and globally the use is about 80 billion pairs are thrown away by about 1.4 million people. Reusable chopsticks in restaurants have a lifespan of 130 meals. In Japan, with disposable ones costing about 2 cents and reusable ones costing typically $1.17, the reusables better at the $2.60 breakeven cost. Campaigns in several countries to reduce this waste are beginning to have some effect.

Israel is considered the world's largest user of disposables food containers and dinnerware. Each month, 250 million plastic cups and more than 12 million paper cups are used, manufactured and disposed. In Israel there are no laws about manufacturing or importing of food disposable containers.

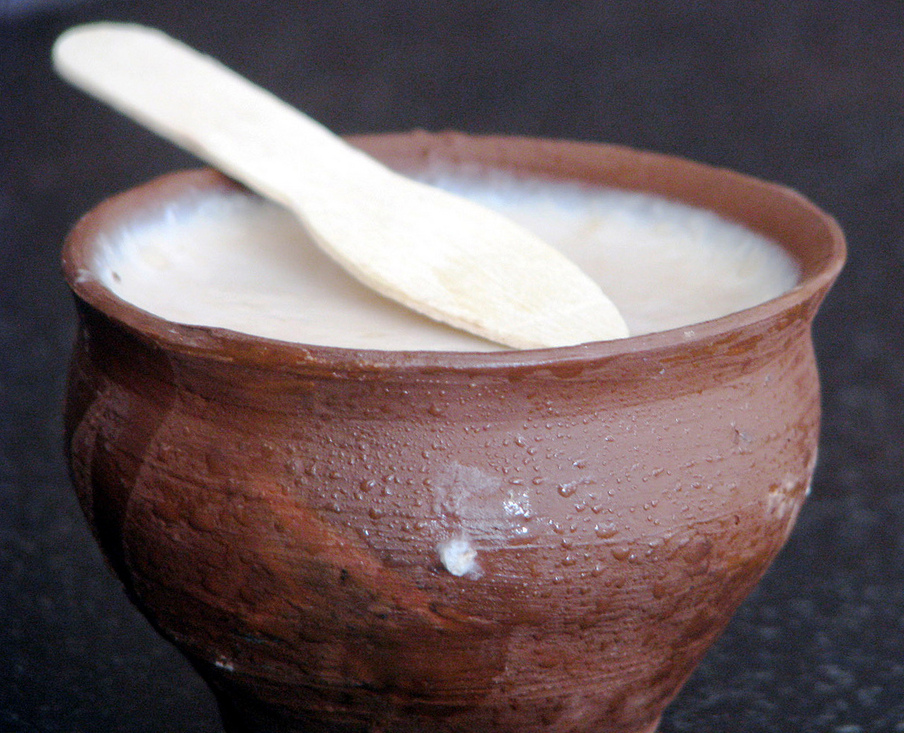
A disposable kulhar clay bowl with dahi (curd)

A kulhar is a traditional handle-less clay cup from South Asia that is typically unpainted and unglazed, and meant to be disposable. Since kulhars are made by firing in a kiln and are almost never reused, they are inherently sterile and hygienic. Bazaars and food stalls in the Indian subcontinent traditionally served hot beverages, such as tea, in kuhlars, which suffused the beverage with an "earthy aroma" that was often considered appealing. Yoghurt, hot milk with sugar as well as some regional desserts, such as kulfi (traditional ice-cream), are also served in kulhars. Kulhars have gradually given way to polystyrene and coated paper cups, because the latter are lighter to carry in bulk and cheaper.

=== Medical and hygiene products ===
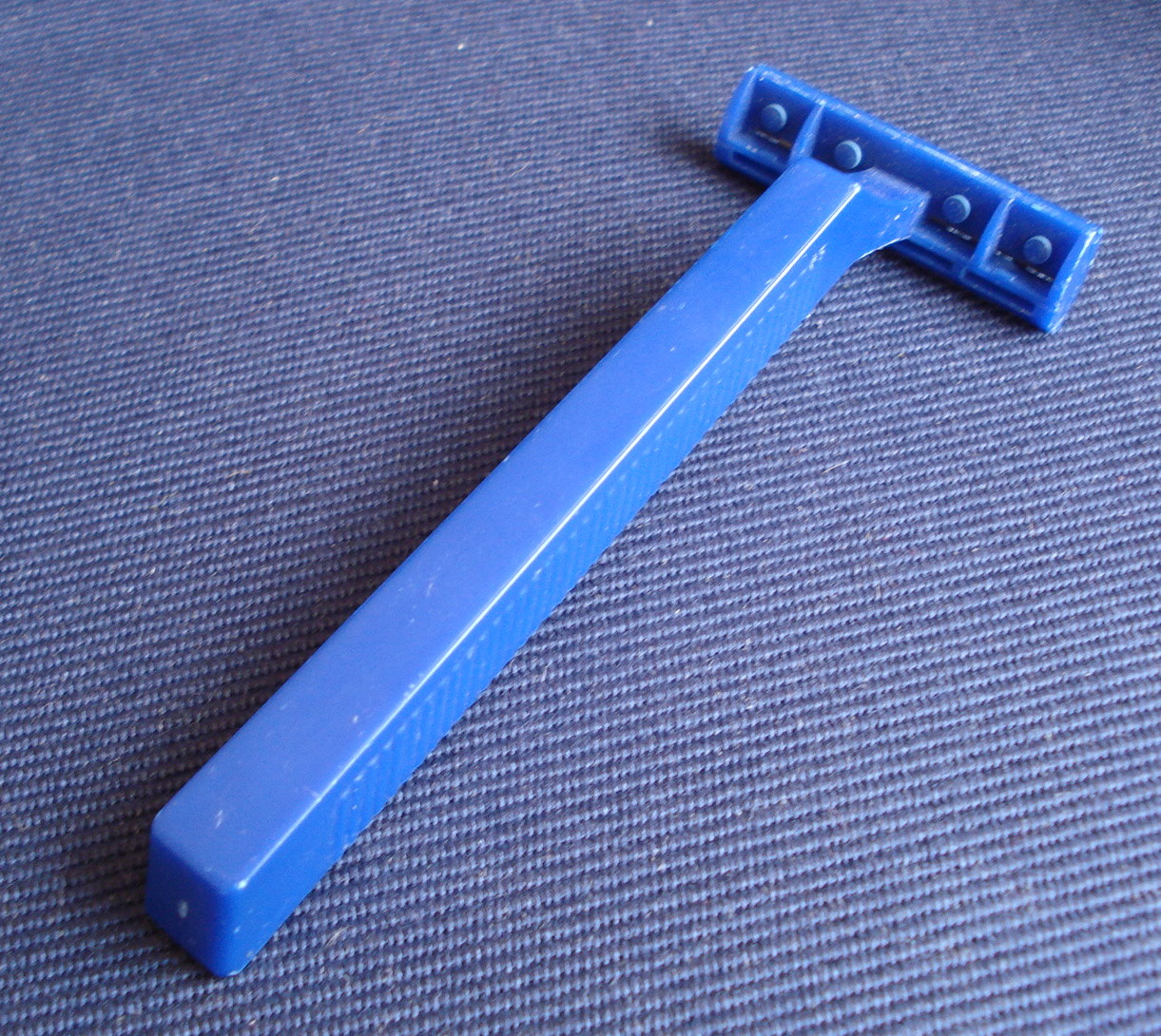
A disposable safety razor

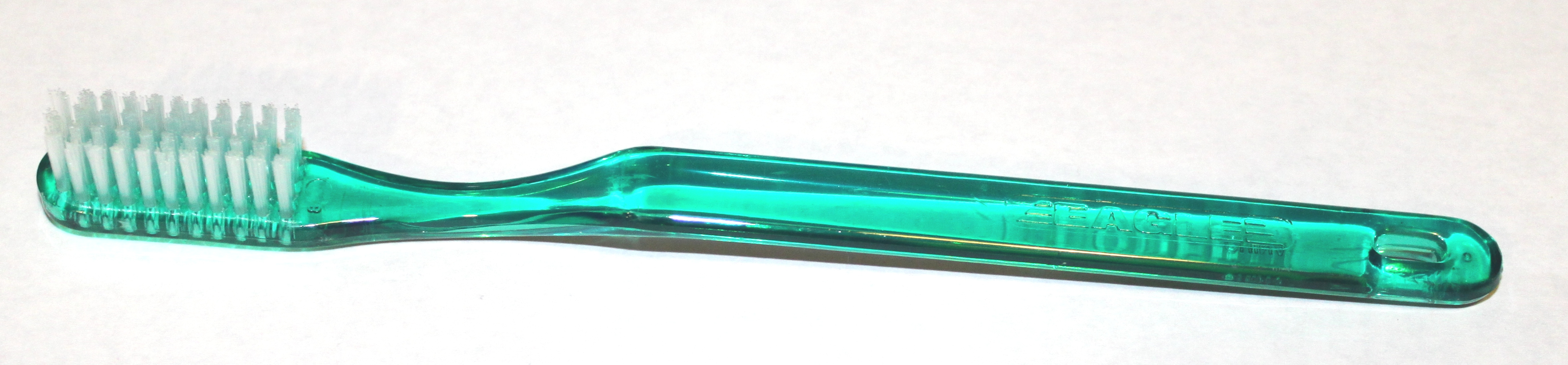
A disposable toothbrush

Medical and surgical device manufacturers worldwide produce a multitude of items that are intended for one use only. The primary reason is infection control; when an item is used only once it cannot transmit infectious agents to subsequent patients. Manufacturers of any type of medical device are obliged to abide by numerous standards and regulations. ISO 15223: Medical Devices and EN 980 cite that single use instruments or devices be labelled as such on their packaging with a universally recognized symbol to denote "do not re-use", "single use", or "use only once". This symbol is the numeral 2, within a circle with a 45° line through it.

Examples of single use medical and hygiene items include:

- Hypodermic needles
- Toilet paper
- Disposable towels, paper towels
- Condoms and other contraception products
- Disposable enemas and similar products
- Cotton swabs and pads
- Medical and cleaning gloves
- Medical dust respirators (dust masks)
- Baby and adult diapers, and training pants
- Shaving razors, safety razors, waxing kits, combs, and other hair control products
- Toothbrushes, dental floss, and other oral care products
- Hospital aprons
- Disposable panties in postpartum
- Contact lenses, although reusable contact lenses are also available.

=== Electronics ===
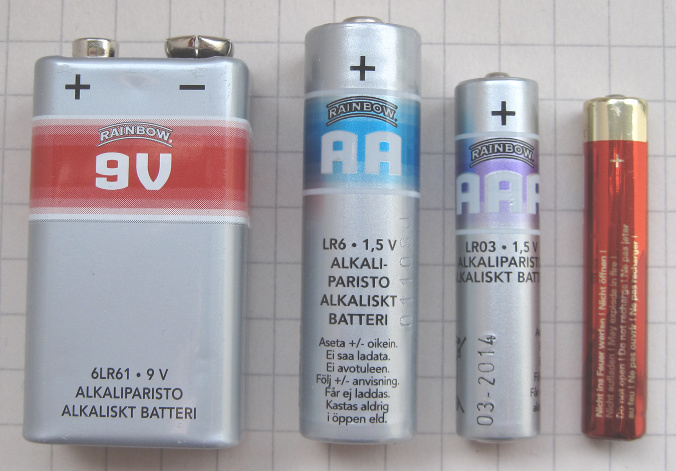
Disposable batteries

- Non-rechargeable batteries are considered hazardous waste and should only be disposed of as such.
- Disposable ink cartridges
- Disposable cameras
- Disposable electronic cigarette devices, coils, cartridges, tanks/pods

=== Defense and law enforcement ===
- PlastiCuffs
- Ammunition
- Barricade tape

=== Other consumer products ===
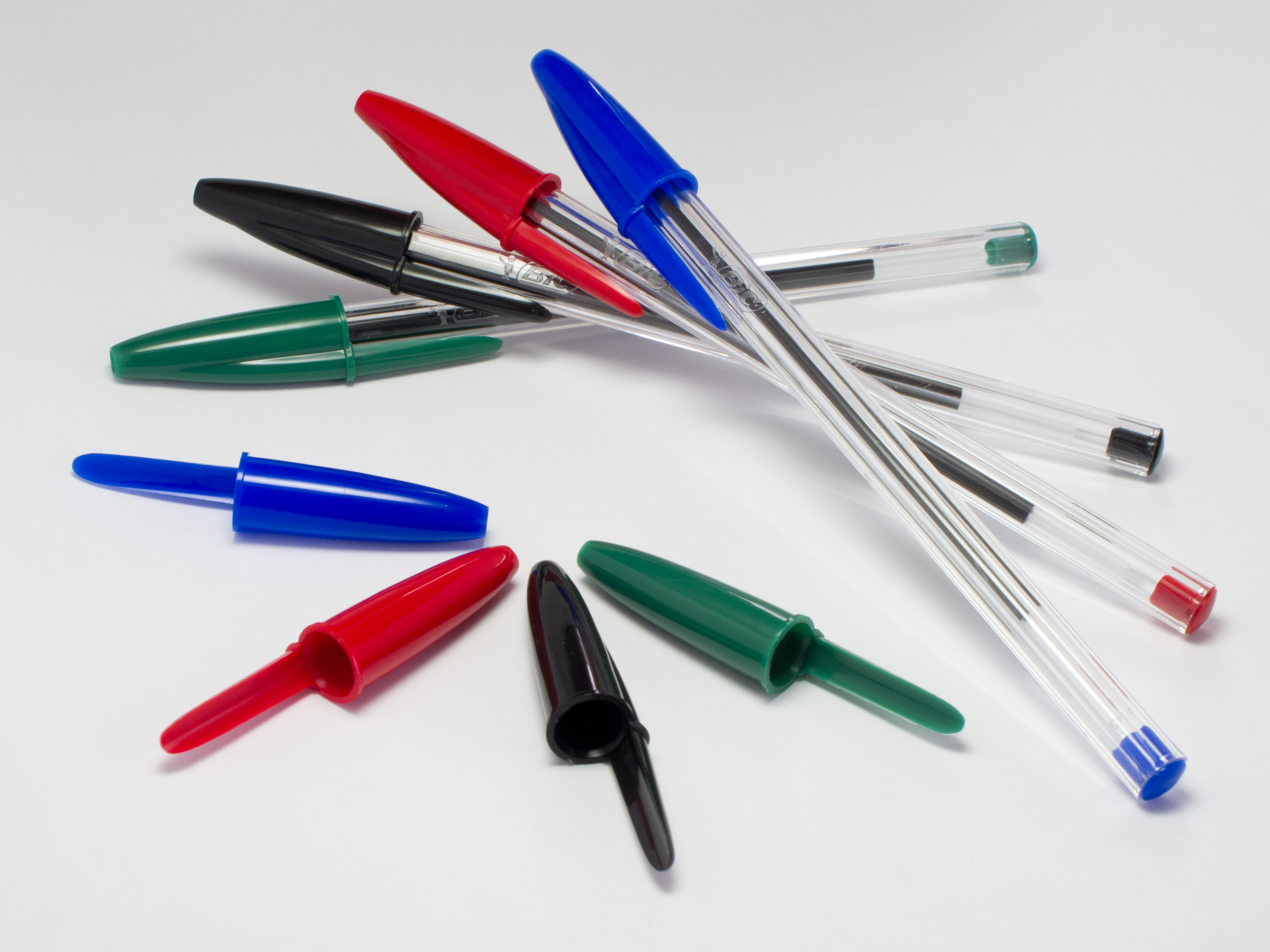
Disposable ballpoint pens

- Garbage bags
- Vacuum cleaner bags, water, air, coolant, and other filters
- Ballpoint pens, erasers, and other writing implements
- Movie sets and theater sets
- Gift wrapping paper
- Labels, stickers, and the associated release liners are single use and usually disposed after use.
- Cigarettes and cigars, plus cigarette packets, filters and rolling paper.
- Paper products; toilet paper, paper napkin, Newspapers. etc

== See also ==
- Disposable tableware – Disposable table utensils
- Durability – Ability of a product to continue to function
- Durable good – Good that has long term use
- Extended producer responsibility – Strategy to integrate environmental costs associated with goods
- Litter – Waste products disposed of incorrectly at an inappropriate location
- Paper recycling – Process by which waste paper is turned into new paper products
- Planned obsolescence – Product design with limited useful life
- Plastic recycling – Processes which convert waste plastic into new items
- Reusable shopping bag – Shopping bag designed to be kept and reused by consumers
- Waste management – Activities and actions required to manage waste from its source to its final disposal
- Société Bic – French manufacturing company
- Single Use Plastic Deathbed – Art installation in Rishikesh, Uttarakhand, India
- Throw-away society – Human society strongly influenced by consumerism

== Sources ==
- This article incorporates text from a free content work. Licensed under Cc BY-SA 3.0 IGO (license statement/permission). Text taken from Drowning in Plastics – Marine Litter and Plastic Waste Vital Graphics, United Nations Environment Programme.
