= Nellipoyil =

- village
- Location in Kerala, India Nellipoyil (India)
- Coordinates: 11°26′25″N 76°2′26″E
- Country: India
- State: Kerala
- District: Kozhikode

Population (2011)
  - Total: 11,014

Languages
  - Official: Malayalam, English
- Time zone: UTC+5:30 (IST)
- PIN: 673580
- Vehicle registration: KL-57
- Nearest city: Kodancherry
- Lok Sabha constituency: Wayanad
- Vidhan Sabha constituency: Thiruvambady

Nellipoyil is a village and is part of Kodancherry Panchayat in Kozhikode district in the state of Kerala, India. Nearest Places are Kodencheri, Thiruvambady, Thamarassery, Thusharagiri Falls. It is under Thiruvambady Assembly Constituency. Areeppara and Thusharagiri are the main tourist spots in Nellipoyil village, Kerala. Two streams originating from the Western Ghats meet in Thusharagiri to form the River Challipuzha and the river has three waterfalls in it: two of which are in the forest and the third right at the border of the forest. The other river, Iruvanjipuzha of the Ennu Ninte Moideen movie fame, has two waterfalls: Arippara and Pathankayam, with both being utilized for hydro electric projects also. Both are famous tourist attractions.

It is a plantation destination that abounds in rubber, arecanut, cocoa and spices like pepper, ginger and nutmeg. Though the population is diverse, Nellipoyil is a hub of Christians mainly Saint Thomas Christians It is known as mini Kottayam as most of the people are migrated from different parts of Kottayam.

== Demographics ==
As of 2011 India census, Nellipoyil had a population of 11014 with 5461 males and 5553 females.
