= Maanasaandarapetta Yezdi =

2016 Indian Malayalam film

- Malayalam: മാനസാന്തരപ്പെട്ട യെസ്ഡി
- Directed by: Arun Omana Sadanandan
- Written by: Arun Omana Sadanandan
- Produced by: Arun Omana Sadanandan; C. K. Sadanandan
- Starring: P. Balachandran; Jayan Cherthala; Indrans
- Cinematography: Akhil Sasidharan
- Edited by: Arun Omana Sadanandan; Jithin Mohan
- Music by: Baiju Dharmajan
- Production company: Water Farm
- Release date: 31 March 2016 (India)
- Country: India
- Language: Malayalam

Maanasaandarapetta Yezdi is a 2016 Indian Malayalam comedy movie, produced and directed by debutant Arun Omana Sadanandan under the banner of Water Farm. The film stars P. Balachandran and Jayan Cherthala in the lead roles along with Indrans, Appunni Sasi and Sivadas Mattannur. The movie was shot in Chembukadavu village in Kozhikode.

== Plot ==
Pappi is a well known mechanic. Pappi's elder brother Chethanappi runs another workshop. Brothers always quarrel with each other. Fed up with their fights, villagers decided that they settle their quarrels with bike race. Their favorite Yezdi bike which was used for the races come to the possession of Philipose. The comic turn of events that take place after this is the theme of the movie.

== Cast ==
- P. Balachandran as Chethanappi
- Jayan Cherthala as Pappi
- Indrans as Philipose
- Aneesha Ummer as Seetha
- Appunni Sasi
- Sivadas Mattannur
- James Eliya
- Sasi Iranjikkal
- John Joseph
- Naveen Kunjumon
- Nazrudeen Valiyaveettil as Kapyaar
- Sinseer as Mukkali
