= Samoothiri Tower =

Samoothiri Tower Calicut
- Tower
- Location in Kerala, India
- Coordinates: 11.25°N 75.77°E
- Country: India
- State: Kerala
- District: Kozhikode

Languages
  - Official: Malayalam, English
- Time zone: UTC+5:30 (IST)

Samoothiri Tower is a proposed multistorey tower located in the southern Indian city of Kozhikode. The tower will be built as the information centre for the tourism of Malabar. The tower will stand 62m tall when completed and will have a historic museum in the first two floors along with a viewing gallery on the 14th floor from which the panoramic views of the whole city can be enjoyed.

The tower is named after the famous rulers of Calicut, the Samoothiri. The tower will be twinned with a garden which is in the name of Kunhali Marakkar and will also have an underground access from the nearby attraction Mananchira Square.

The design of the building is approved and the Kerala government has sanctioned the tower.

== See also ==
- Kozhikode
- Mananchira Square
- Sarovaram
