= Chembukadavu =

Village in Kerala, India

Chembukadavu is a village situated near to Thiruvambady and Kodanchery in Kozhikode district of Kerala. Thusharagiri Falls is near to here. The Chembukadavu Dam project I in Kozhikode, North Kerala, India is the first of the string of 14 small hydroelectric projects undertaken by the Kerala State Electricity Board (KSEB), in collaboration with Hang Tso International Centre in China.It is located about 50 km east of Kozhikode in the foothills of Western Ghats

In the first phase, the 2.7 MW mini hydroelectric project is expected to yield 6.59 million units. Without using a reservoir, the water in the Chaliya river is channeled through a weir, tanks, and pipes to a powerhouse to generate electricity. The first four out of the 14, Chembukadavu I, Chembukadavu II, Urumi I and Urumi II will be commissioned by the end the year,. Chemukadavu I and Chembukadavu II have warranted an investment of Rs 11.38 crore and Rs 12.72 crore and are envisaged to yield 6.59 million units and 9.03 million units respectively.

== UNIDO ==
UNIDO's setting up of its regional small hydroelectric power base in Thiruvananthapuram has enhanced Kerala's investment potential in the cost-effective small hydroelectric power. The contribution of the UNIDO's southern hub will primarily be in planning and in facilitating soft loans for mini hydel power projects.

== Transportation ==
Chembukadavu village connects to other parts of India through Calicut city on the west and Thamarassery town on the east. National highway No.66 passes through Kozhikode and the northern stretch connects to Mangalore, Goa and Mumbai. The southern stretch connects to Cochin and Trivandrum. The eastern National Highway No.54 going through Adivaram connects to Kalpetta, Mysore and Bangalore. The nearest airports are at Kannur and Kozhikode. The nearest railway station is at Kozhikode.

== See also ==
- Chembukkadavu 2 Weir
