= St. Mary's Syriac Orthodox Church, Maikave =

Vattal Kurishu Pally St.George Church, Vattal
- Georgian Pilgrim Centre

- Location in Kerala, India
- Coordinates: 11.4090659°N 75.9833121°E
- Country: India
- State: Kerala
- District: Kozhikode

Government
  - Body: Under St. Mary's Jacobite Syrian Church Maikavu

Languages
  - Official: Malayalam, English
- Time zone: UTC+5:30 (IST)
- Postal code: 673573

Vattal Kurisu Pally in Maikavu is one of Kerala's oldest Syriac Orthodox pilgrim centers. The patron saints of this parish are Saint George and Parumala Thirumeni.

Situated by the side of coconut palms and a wide stretch of arecanut fields, at a village called Maikavu which is about 40 km from Kozhikode, this church is the refuge of thousands of people worldwide who seek the intercession of St. George. The Mother Church of this chapel is St.Mary's Jacobite Syrian Church, Maikavu.
