= Single Use Plastic Deathbed =

Art installation in Rishikesh, Uttarakhand, India

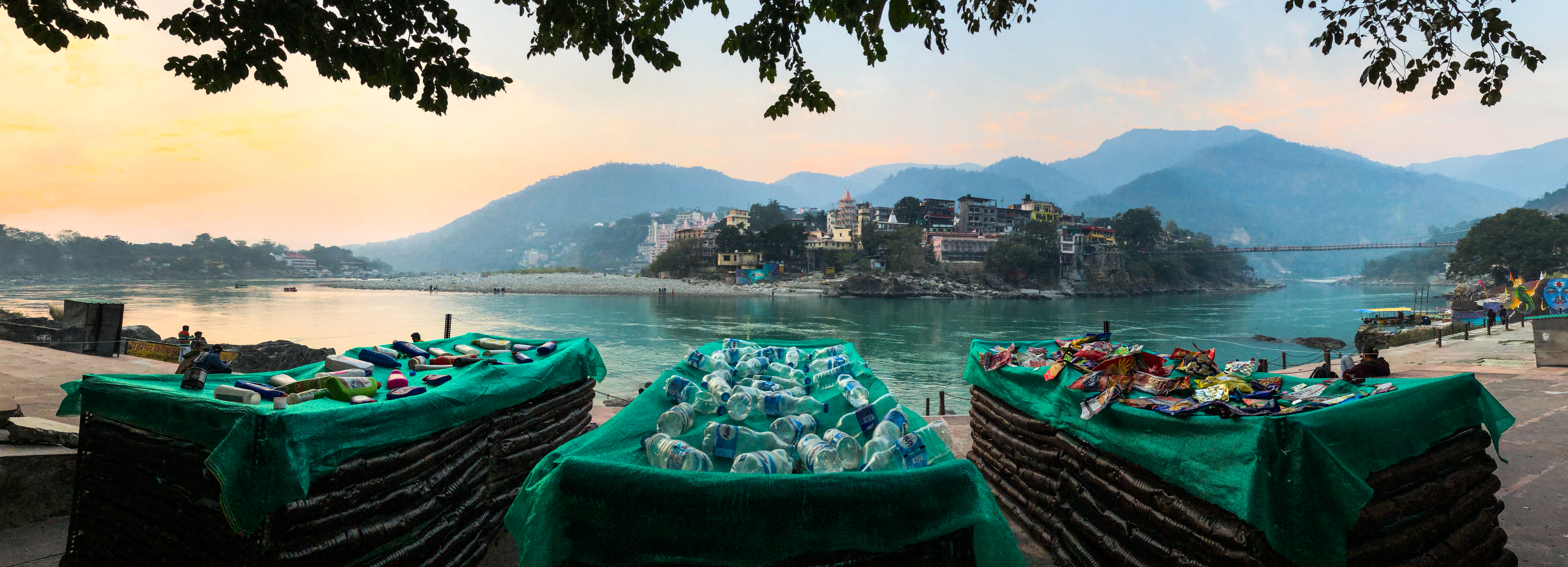
- Installation on the bank Ganga river
- 30.124389°N 78.329639°E
- Location: Freedom Ghat, Rishikesh, Uttarakhand, India
- Type: Installation
- Material: Single use plastic waste
- Opening date: 20 December 2020

The Single Use Plastic Deathbed is an art installation at Freedom Ghat on the bank of Ganga river near Laxman Jhula in Rishikesh, Uttarakhand, India. It features three funeral pyres made from single use plastic waste. The installation was opened in December 2020.

== History ==
Climate activist Aakash Ranison organised six waste cleanup drives in various tourist places in Rishikesh with help of volunteers in September 2020. Some of the collected plastic waste was used to build the installation with support of the Rishikesh Municipal Corporation and local people to create the awareness regarding ill effects of single use plastic. It was opened on 20 December 2020 on the International Human Solidarity Day.

== Installation ==
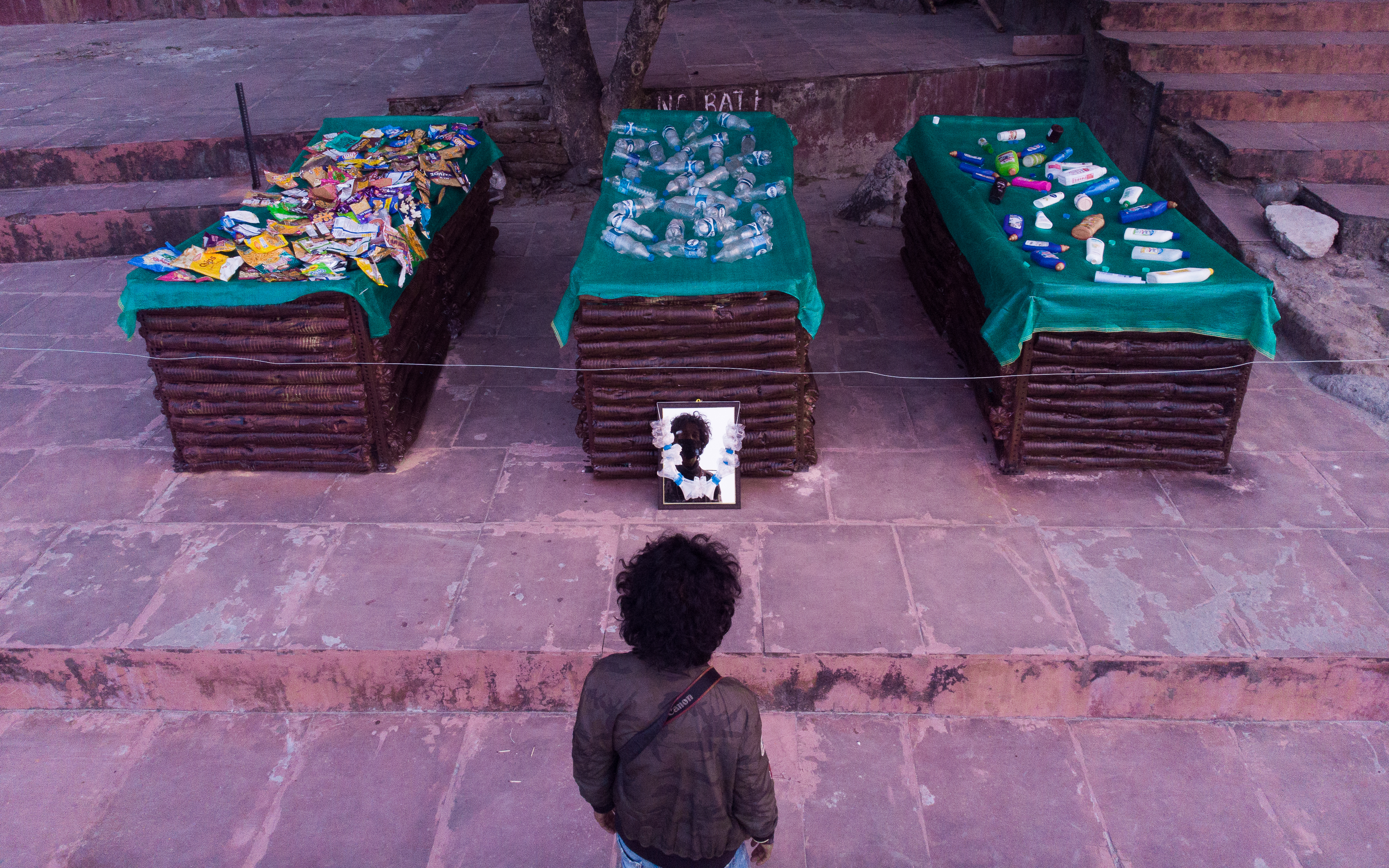
Funeral pyres displaying plastic waste

There are three funeral pyres measuring 8 feet long, 3 feet wide and 3 feet high. Each of these pyres is made of 26 kg of single use plastic, equivalent to the average amount of plastic waste generated by one Indian citizen annually. Each pyre contains a different common type of plastic waste: disposable bottles, disposable food packages and plastic containers respectively. There is a mirror in front of the pyres, placed so that the viewer can see their own reflection while looking at the pyres.

== See also ==
- Climate change art – Art inspired by climate change
- COVID-19 pandemic in India
- Disposable product – Product designed to be discarded after use
- Environmental issues in India
- Found object – Non-standard material used in work of art
- Marine Cemetery – Art installation dedicated to nine endangered marine and riverine species
- Marine pollution – Pollution of oceans from substances discarded by humans
- Pollution of the Ganges – Diaspora of environmental pollution in Indian Ganges
- Waste management in India
- Water pollution in India – Overview of water pollution in India
