= Kodencheri =

Kodanchery Kodanchry
- Village
- Location in Kerala, India Kodanchery (India)
- Coordinates: 11.4719°N 75.96899°E
- Country: India
- State: Kerala
- District: Kozhikode
- Taluk: Thamarassery
- Block Panchayat: Koduvally
- Grama Panchayath: Kodanchery

Population (2001)
  - Total: 18,461

Languages
  - Official: Malayalam, English
- Time zone: UTC+5:30 (IST)
- PIN: 673580
- Vehicle registration: KL-57
- Nearest city: Thamarassery Kozhikode
- Website: www.kodancherry.com

Kodanchery is a town in Kozhikode district in the state of Kerala, India. The town is a Panchayat headquarters.

Nearby towns are Thamarassery, Thiruvambady, Nellipoyil, and Thusharagiri Falls. Kodanchery falls under Thiruvambadi Assembly Constituency.

== Demographics ==
As of 2011 India census, Kodanchery had a population of 18,738 with 9211 males and 9,527 females.

Thiruvambady, Pullurampara, Nellipoyil, and Engapuzha are nearby villages of kodanchery. St. Mary's Forane Church, which is a Marian Pilgrimage Center, and St. Joseph's HSS school are located in the heart of the city. It is a plantation destination that abounds in rubber, areca nut, pepper, ginger and various spices. The famous tourist destination Thusharagiri waterfalls is just 10 km from Kodanchery town and 50 km from Kozhikode City.

== Culture and people ==
Though the population is diverse, Kodanchery is a hub of Christians, mainly Saint Thomas Christians. It is known as mini Kottayam, as most of the people are migrated from different parts of Kottayam.

== Administration ==
Kodanchery is part of Thiruvambady legislative assembly constituency and Wayanad parliamentary constituency. The current MLA is Linto Joseph (Indian politician)]. The current MP is Priyanka Gandhi.The Grama Panchayat President is Sri Alex Thomas. It is divided into 21 wards. It is in the limits of three Villages - Kodancherry, Koodathai and Nellipoil but in only one Police Station - Kodancherry. PIN Code of Kodancherry is 673580.

== History ==
The first church in Kodenchery was started at Ambalamkunnu near Kannoth. As the population increased, it was moved to Ambattupadi for convenience, and later to the town where the Kodanchery LP School is situated.

== Tourism ==
Thusharagiri Falls are a tourist destination in the Malabar region, with five water falls right in the middle of the forest. Two streams originating from the Western Ghats meet here to form the Chalippuzha River. The river diverges into three waterfalls creating a snowy spray, which gives the name, 'Thusharagiri' ("snow capped mountains"). The highest waterfall is the Thenpara (honey hill) that falls from an altitude of 75 metres. Chembukkadavu Weir is a small diversion dam situated in Chalippuzha river

The place is very well known for Extreme white water river Kayaking which an International level competition conducted every year during The Malabar River Festival, one of Asia’s biggest and most exciting white-water kayaking events, held each year (usually in July) in Kodenchery.

== Education ==
- Govt.College Kodancherry
- St. Joseph's Higher Secondary School
- Markaz Knowledge City
- St.Mary's English medium school Kodenchery.(CBSE)
- St. George's Higher Secondary School Velamcode
- St. Antony's High School Kannoth

== Transportation ==
Kodenchery village connects to other parts of India through Calicut city on the west and Thamarassery town on the east. National highway 66 passes through Kozhikode and the northern stretch connects to Mangalore, Goa and Mumbai. The southern stretch connects to Cochin and Trivandrum. The eastern National Highway 766 going through Adivaram connects to Kalpetta, Mysore and Bangalore. The nearest airports are at Kannur and Kozhikode. The nearest railway station is at Kozhikode.
