= Sarovaram Bio Park =

Eco-friendly development in Kozhikode, India

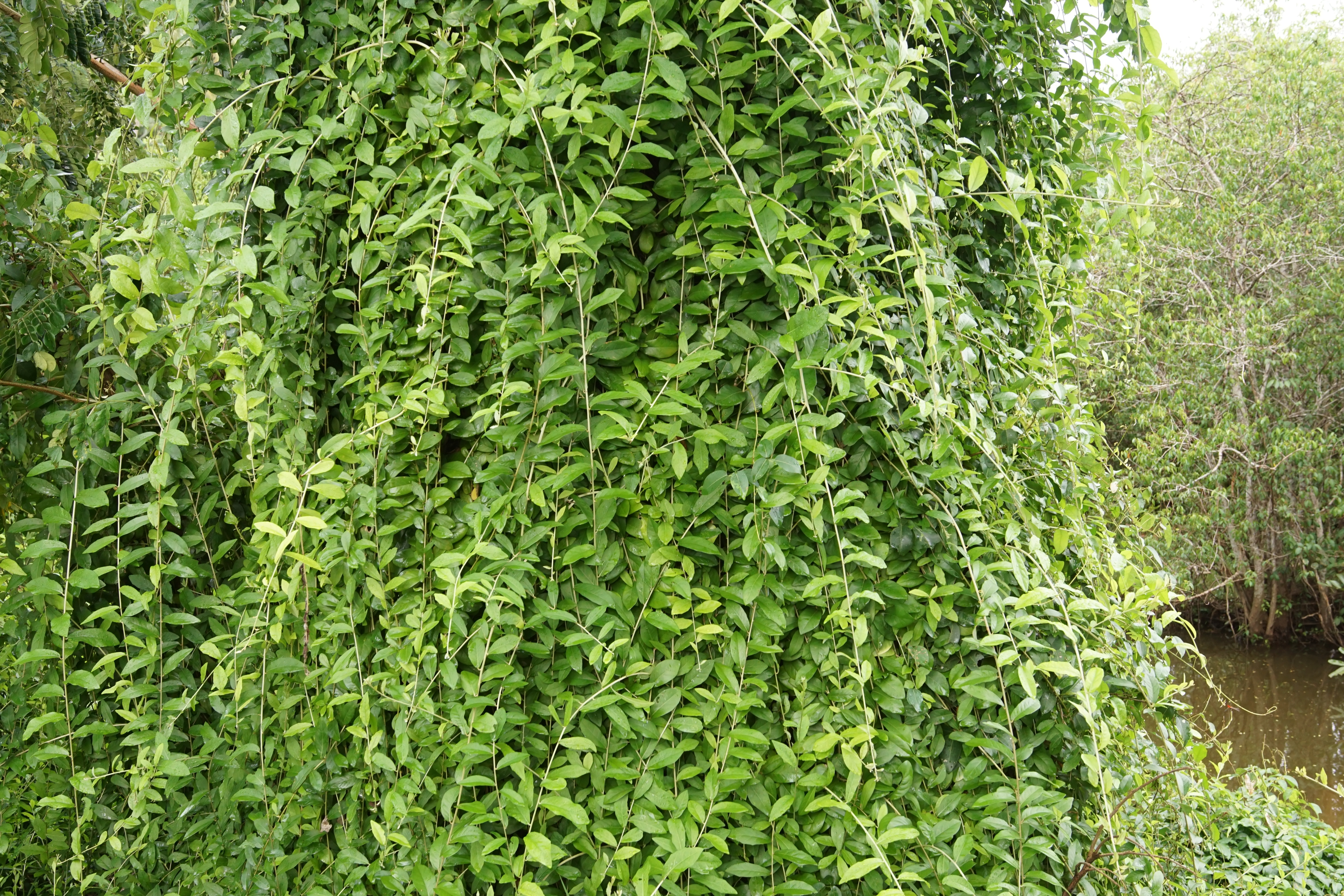
Sarovaram has thick vegetation

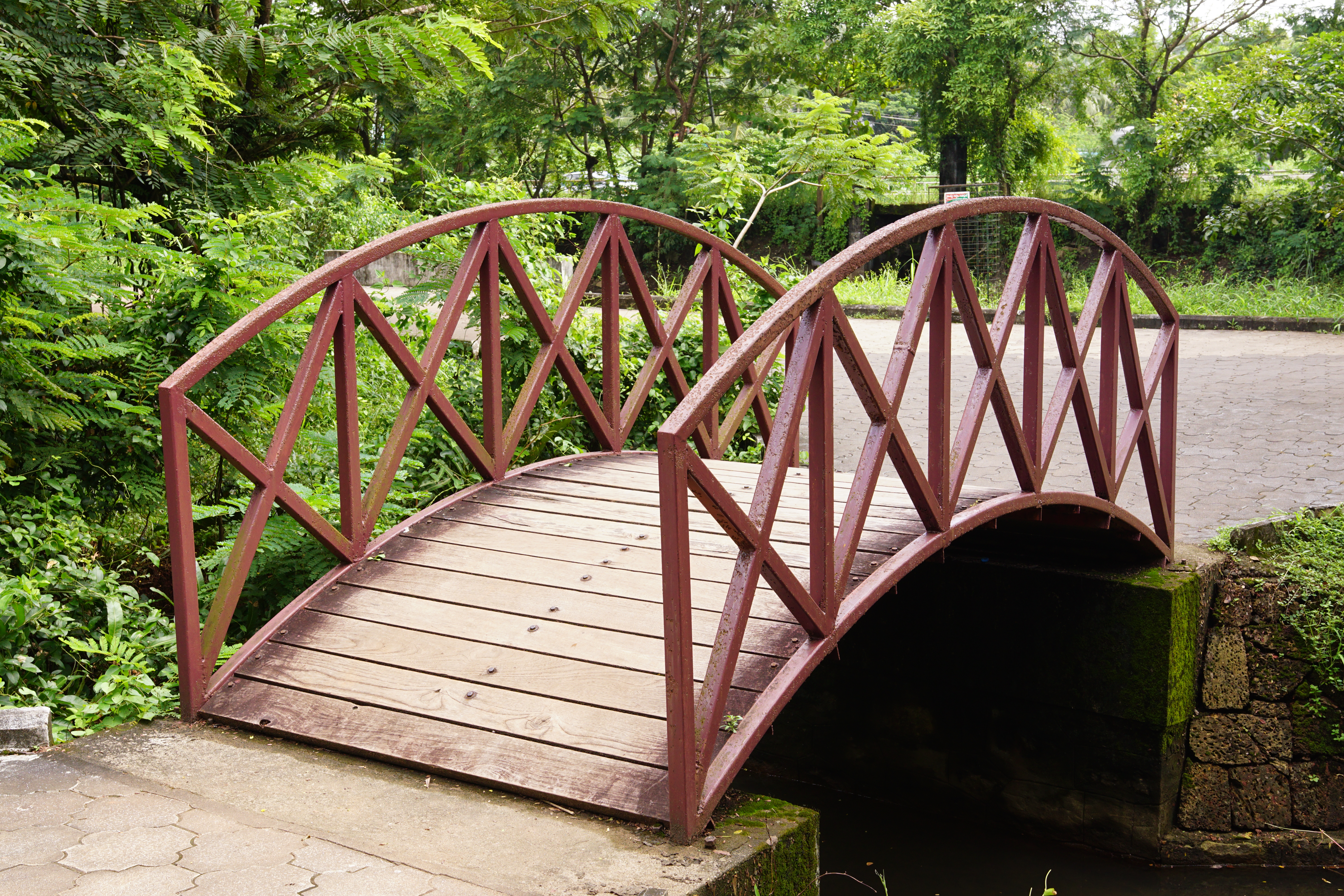
Sarovaram Bio Park, Kozhikode

Sarovaram (also known as Sarovaram Bio Park) is an eco-friendly development near Kottooly in Kozhikode city in India. The park is situated adjacent to Canoly Canal. The project has been developed with an eco-friendly theme and is located in an ecosystem consisting of wetlands and mangrove forests containing bird habitats.

== Protected species ==
This park is a protected place to conserve mangrove species and other flora. This park is identified as one of the 27 wetlands of India. There are 7 mangrove species and 29 associated species. This park is the habitat for 34 types of birds. The canal is eleven kilometres long and connects the Korapuzha and Kallayi rivers. The park contains boating facilities, musical fountain and an open-air theatre. Of late the park has gained a reputation as a popular hangout of college couples. It is also the favourite spot of photographers for pre marriage shoots and other photoshoots.The construction has been done in traditional Kerala style.

The Sarovaram project is being developed in stages, and the first few stages are complete and open to public. It is one of the more popular spots in the city to spend an evening, along with the beach and Mananchira Square.

== Image gallery ==
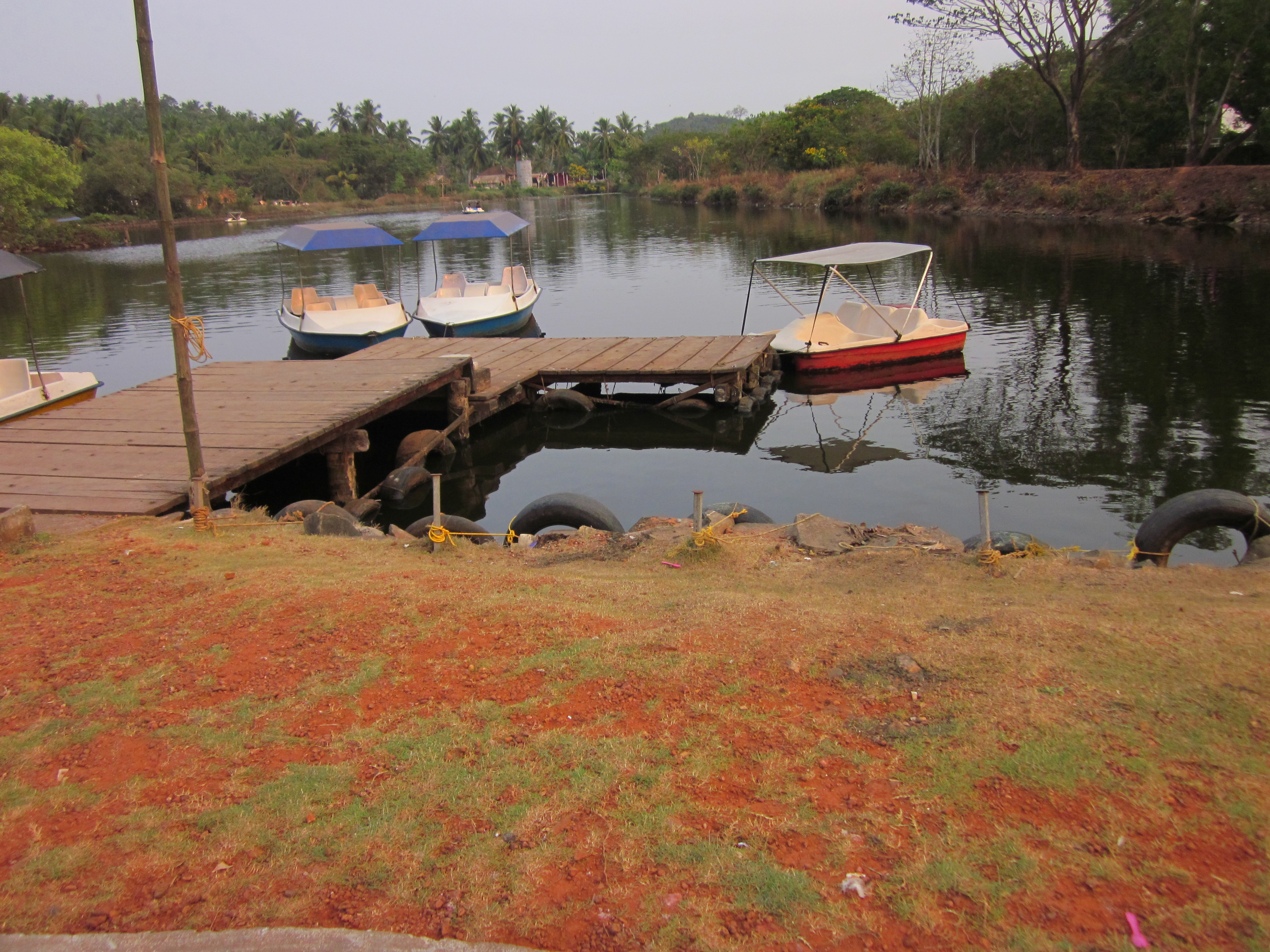
Boating

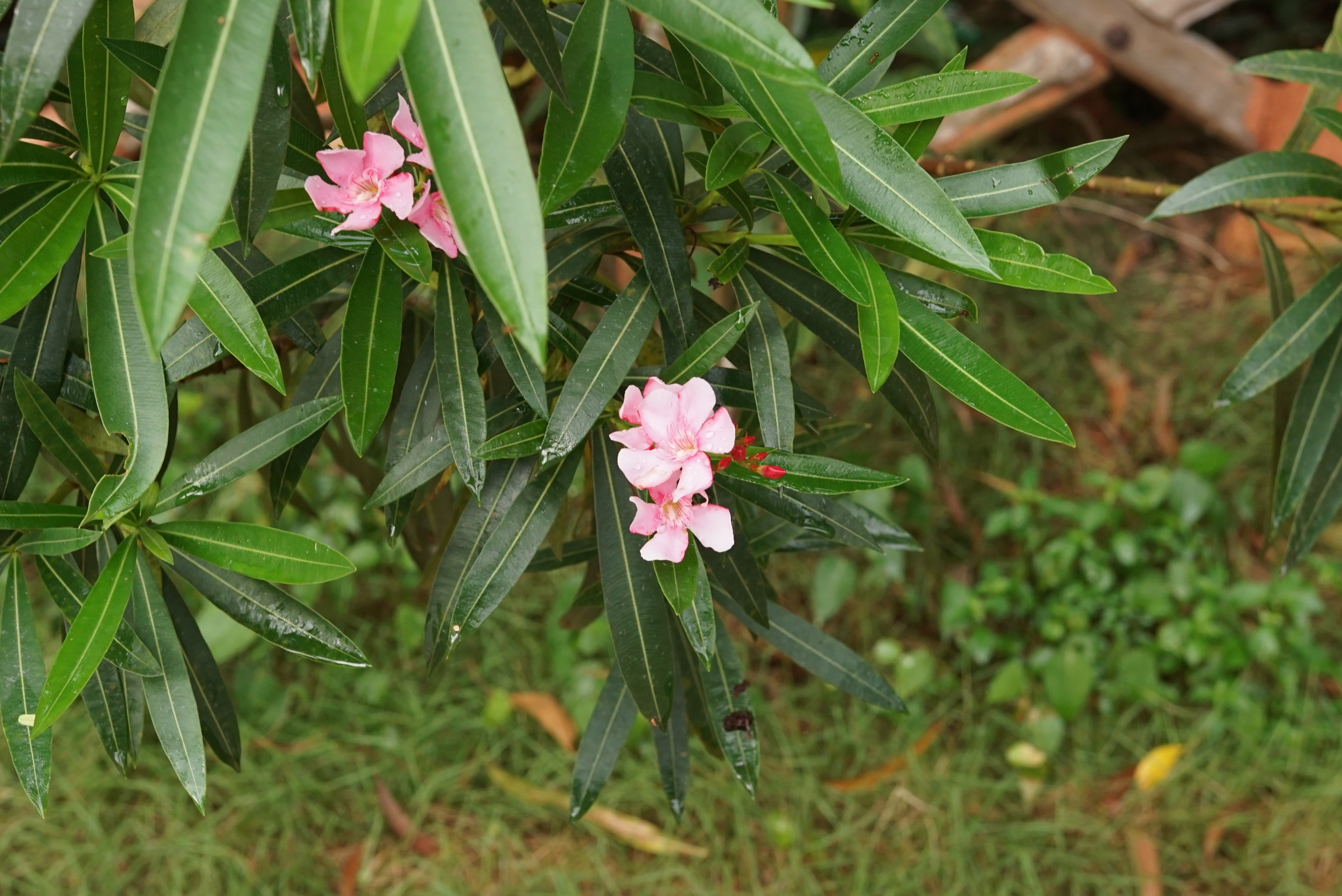
Flowers

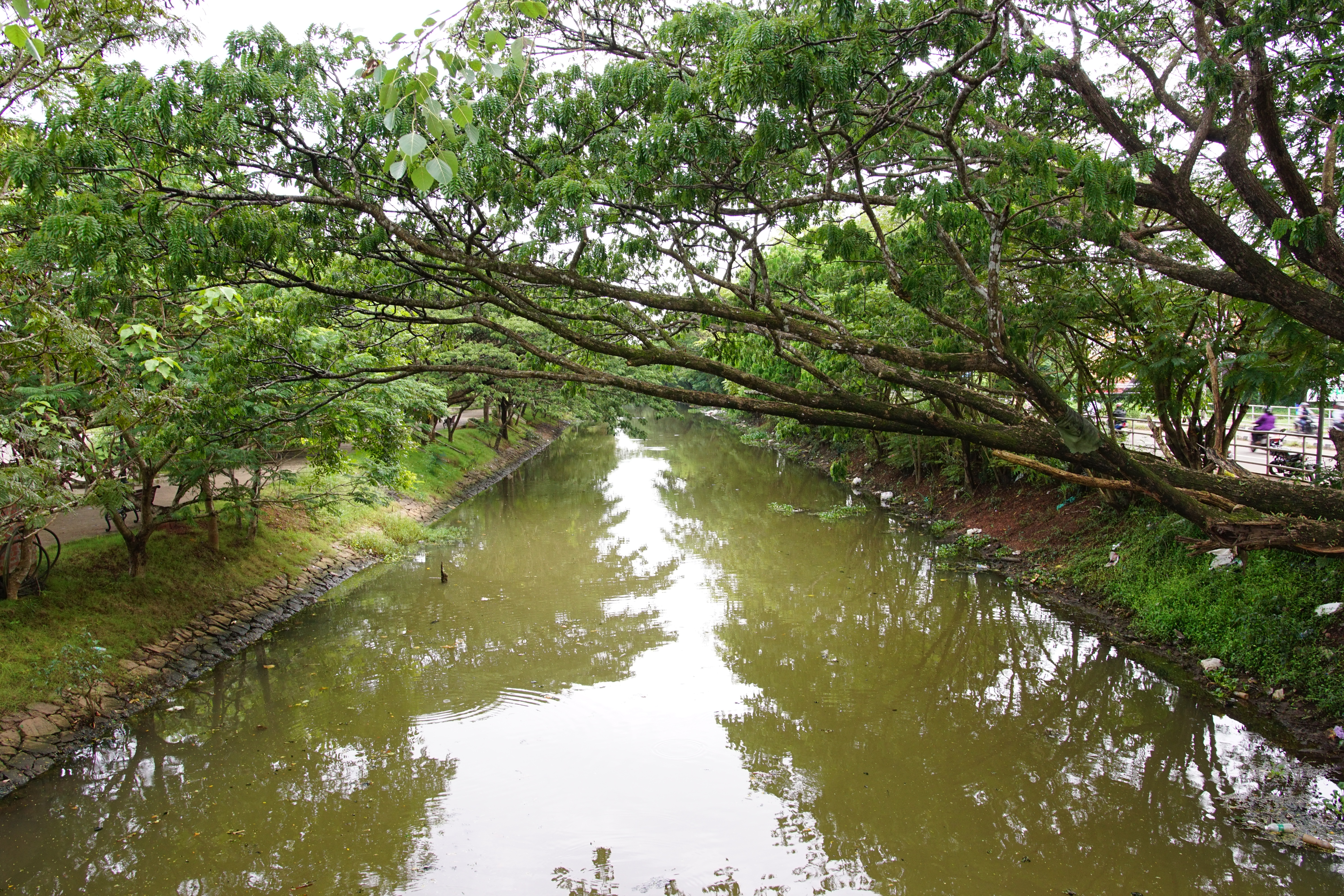
The Connolly Canal

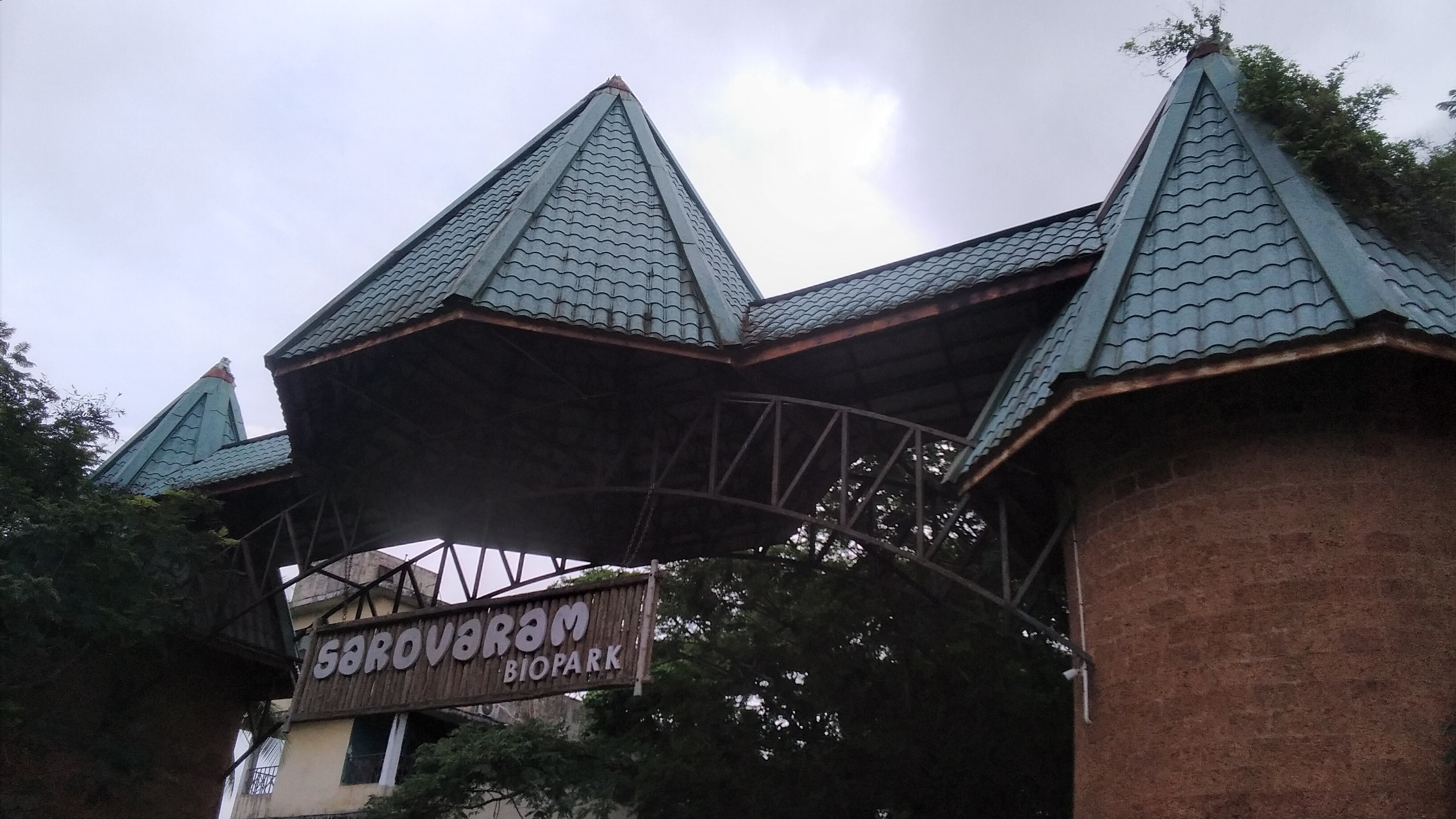
Sarovaram Biopark in Kollhikode, Kerala, India

Entrance to Miyawaki Forest at Sarovaram Biopark

== See also ==
- Mananchira Square
- Samoothiri Tower
- Canoly Canal
- Beypore
