= Marine Cemetery =

Art installation dedicated to nine endangered marine and riverine species

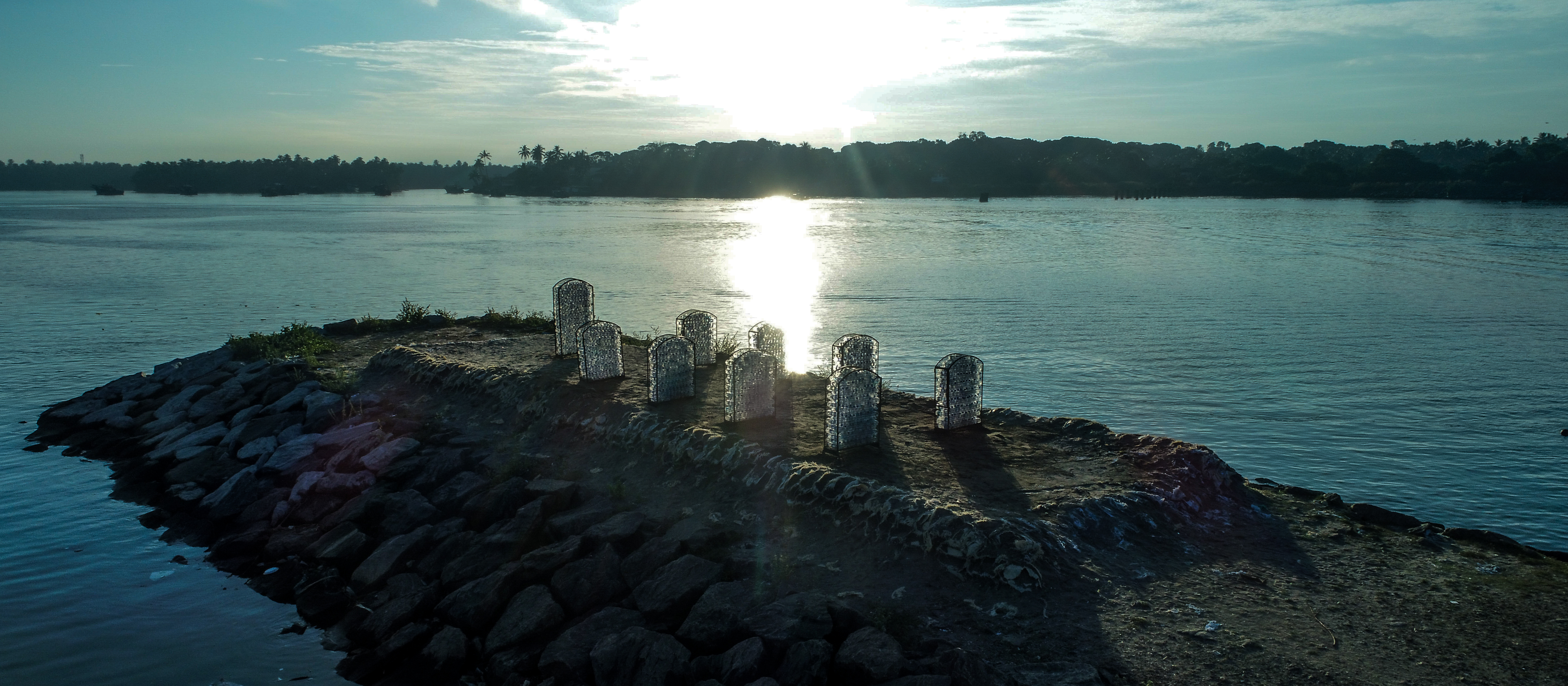
- Marine Cemetery at evening
- 11.163281°N 75.803560°E
- Location: Beypore beach, Kozhikode, Kerala, India
- Type: Installation
- Material: Iron frames, plastic bottles
- Opening date: 4 December 2019
- Dedicated to: Nine endangered water-dwelling species

The Marine Cemetery is an art installation located at Beypore beach in Kozhikode, Kerala, India dedicated to nine endangered marine and riverine species. It is made up of 2,000 plastic bottles that had been previously collected from the beach. It was opened in 2019.

== History ==
The Marine Cemetery is dedicated to marine and riverine species which are endangered due to plastic waste, water pollution, climate change, and overexploitation. The installation is an awareness initiative.

In November 2019, a team of about 80 volunteers cleaned up Beypore beach, and collected over 800 kg (1,800 lb) of plastic waste which they handed over to Kozhikode Municipal Corporation for recycling. 2,000 plastic bottles were left behind which were later used for building the installation. The monument was made by Climate Activist Aakash Ranison & initiated by Jellyfish Watersports in collaboration with the Beypore Port administration, the authorities of Kozhikode district, and under the Clean Beach Mission of the Ministry of Environment, Forest and Climate Change. It was opened on 4 December 2019, the World Wildlife Conservation Day, by S. Sambasiva Rao, District Collector of Kozhikode, and V. K. C. Mammed Koya, MLA for Beypore constituency.

== Installation ==
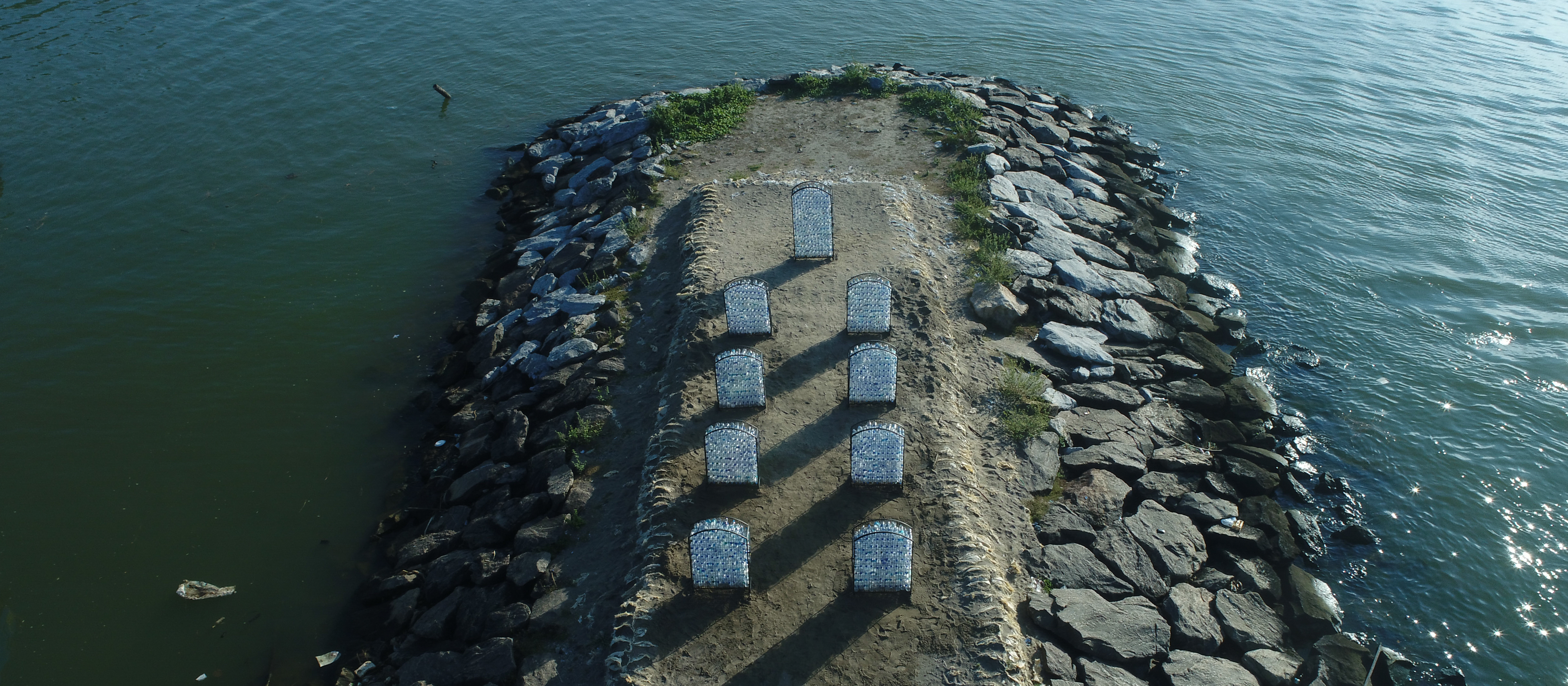
Nine markers

The installation has nine markers, each dedicated to an endangered marine and riverine species, built with plastic bottles encased in gravestone-shaped iron frames. Eight of these markers are 4 feet (1.2 m) in height, and are dedicated to the seahorse, parrotfish, leatherback sea turtles, eagle rays, sawfish, dugong, zebra shark, and the hammerhead shark. One of the markers is 6 feet (1.8 m) in height, and is dedicated to the endangered native freshwater fish species Miss Kerala.

== See also ==
- Single Use Plastic Deathbed
