= Modern Packaging =

US periodical

- The cover of Volume 1, Number 1
- Publisher: Breskin Publications
- Founded: 1927
- First issue: September 1927; 99 years ago
- Final issue: 1979; 47 years ago
- Country: United States
- Language: American English

Modern Packaging was an American trade publication for the packaging industry. It ran until 1979, after which it was merged into Package Engineering.

In 1956, editor of the magazine Lloyd Stouffer received media attention at a convention for the Society of the Plastics Industry by saying that "the future of plastics is in the trash can". In 1963, he presented a report to the same industry praising their success in changing consumer mindsets towards embracing disposable plastic packaging.
