= St. Mary's Orthodox Church, Maikavu =

Church in India

Coordinates: 11.4029°N 75.9776°E

Malankara (Indian) Orthodox Church
- മൈക്കാവ് വലിയ പള്ളി
- Primate: Baselios Marthoma Mathews III
- Headquarters: Devalokam, Kottayam, Kerala
- Territory: India
- Founder: St. Thomas the Apostle
- Independence: Apostolic Era
- Recognition: Oriental Orthodox
- Official website: Malankara Orthodox Syrian Church

St. Mary's Orthodox Church is one of the old churches in Malabar Diocese of the Malankara Orthodox Church.

== History ==
Church begins with the history of settlers of Malabar, The 1930s witnessed the exodus of settlers from Travancore - Cochin area to Malabar The hard working agriculturists from these places left their native lands and settled in the virgin land of the hills and valleys of Kozhikode, Kannur and Wayanad Districts.

Unmindful of the vagaries of nature they toiled in the farmlands and occasionally longed for the church bells. They started establishing worshipping places here and small parishes developed. There are chapels in Unithram Kunnu, Chamora, Chundakunnu, Kattumunda, Kayalum para.
