= Thusharagiri Falls =

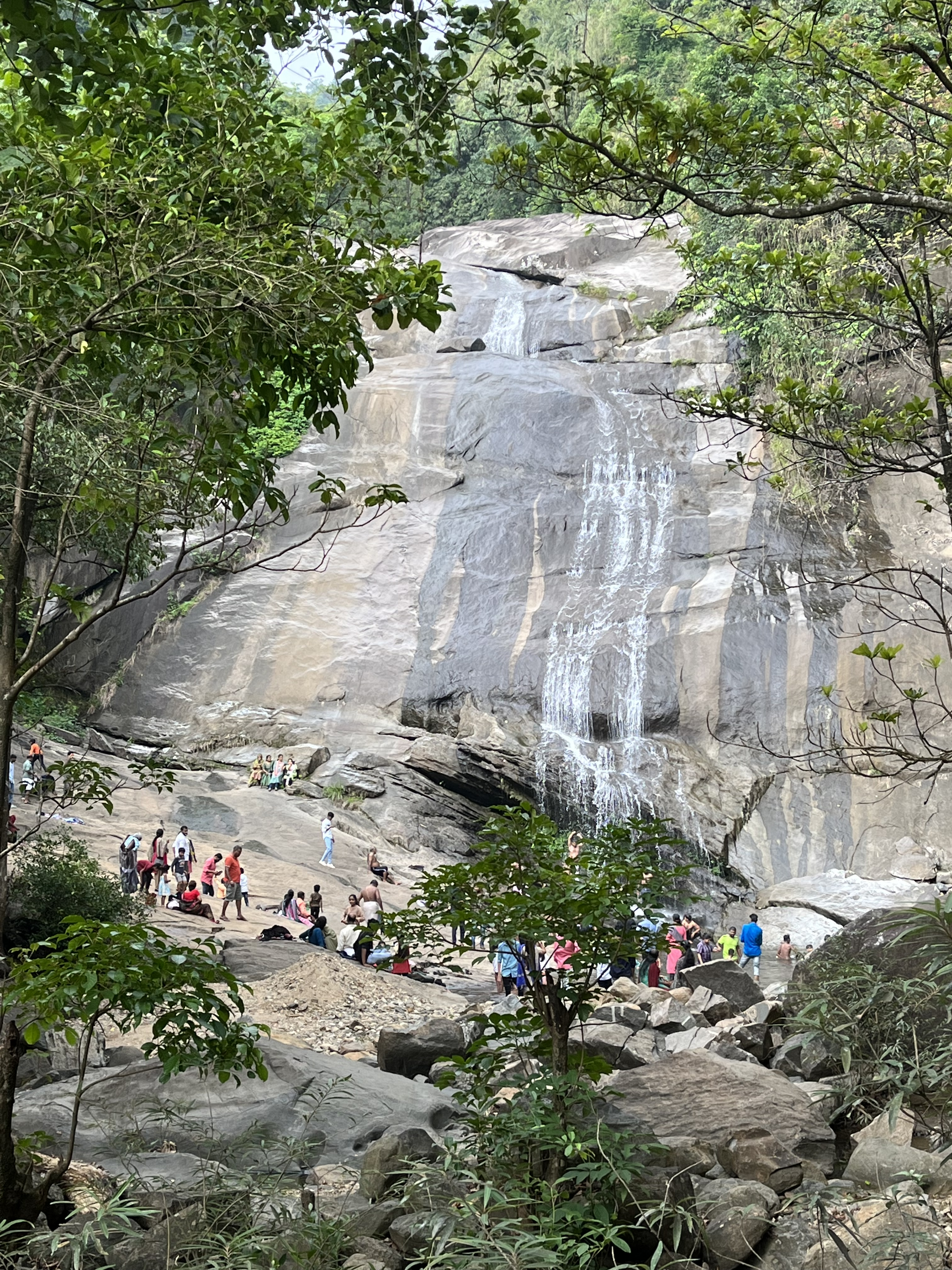
- Interactive map of Thusharagiri Falls
- Location: Kozhikode district, Kerala, India
- Coordinates: 11°28′21.24″N 76°3′13.43″E
- Total height: 75 metres (246 ft)
- Watercourse: Chalippuzha River

Thusharagiri Falls is a waterfall located in Kozhikode district in the Indian state of Kerala, India.

Two streams originating from the Western Ghats meet here to form the Chalippuzha River. The river diverges into three waterfalls creating a snowy spray, which gives the name, 'Thusharagiri' a word which means the snow-capped mountain. Of the three waterfalls, the highest is the Thenpara, falling from an altitude of 75 metres (246 ft). The other two are the Erattumukku falls and Mazhavil Chattam falls.

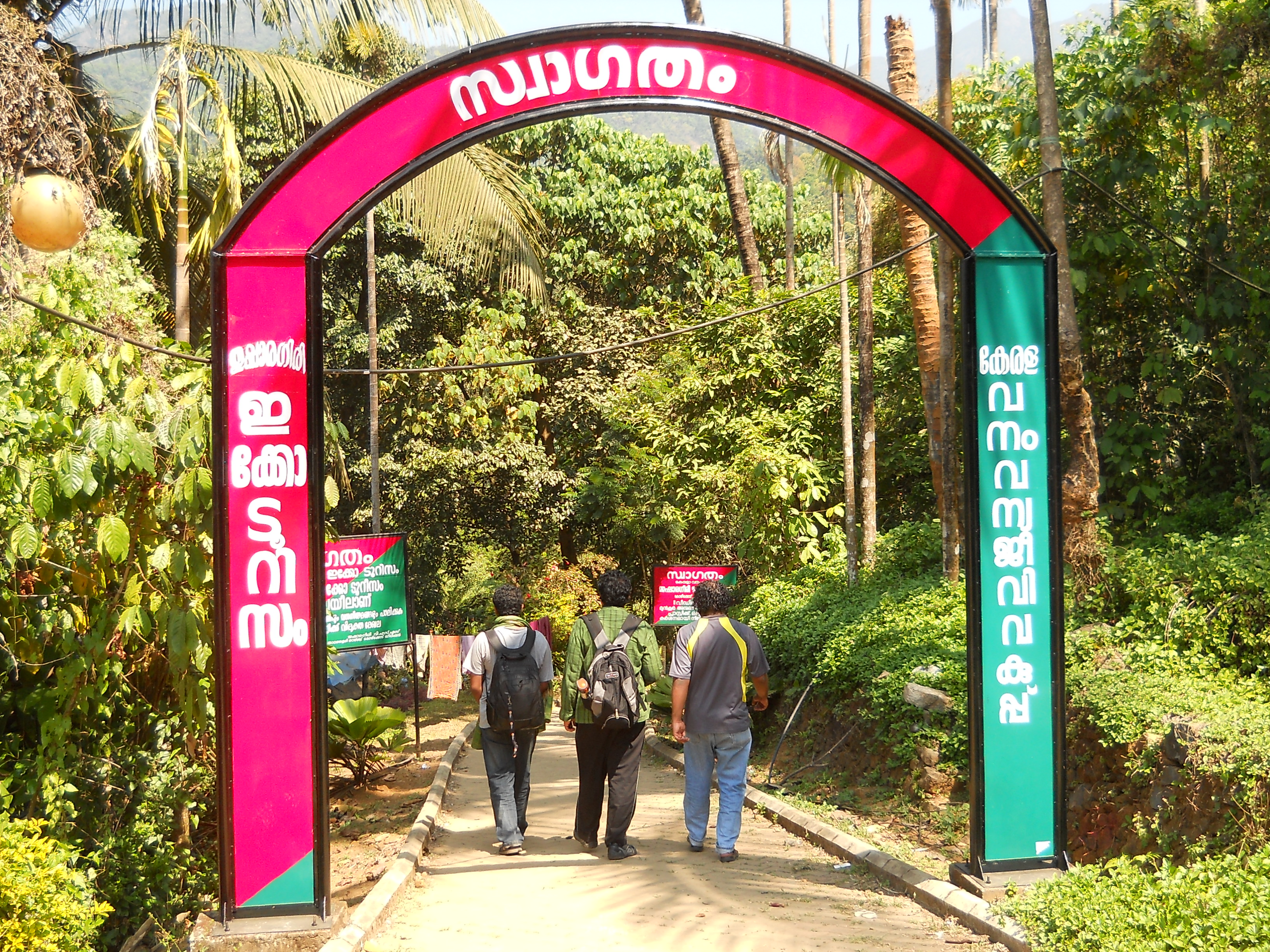
Entrance

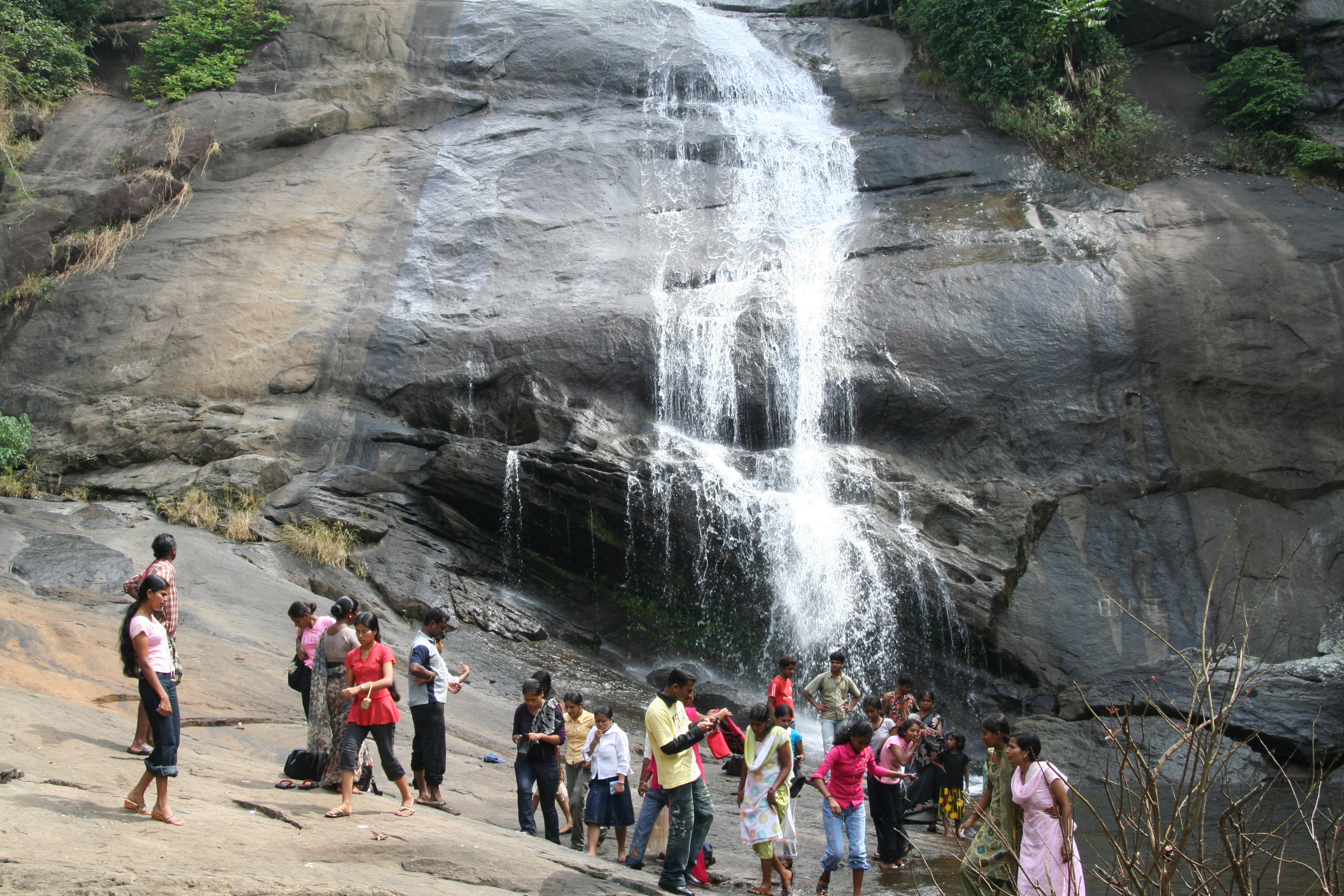

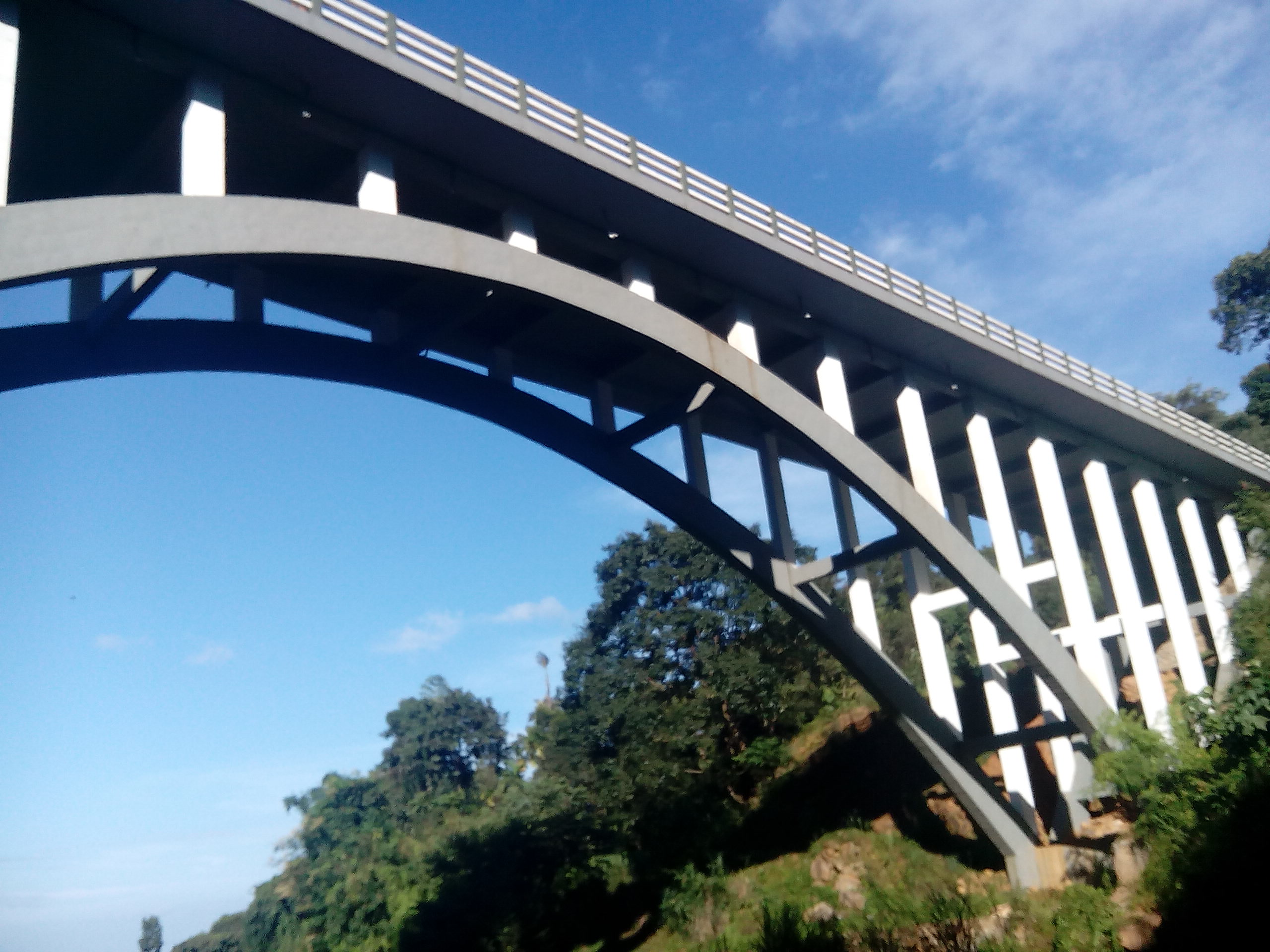
husharagiri bridge is located at Chalippuzha near thusharagiri waterfalls. This is one of the tallest arch bridge in Kerala.

== See also ==
- List of waterfalls
- List of waterfalls in India
