= Karassery =

- Village
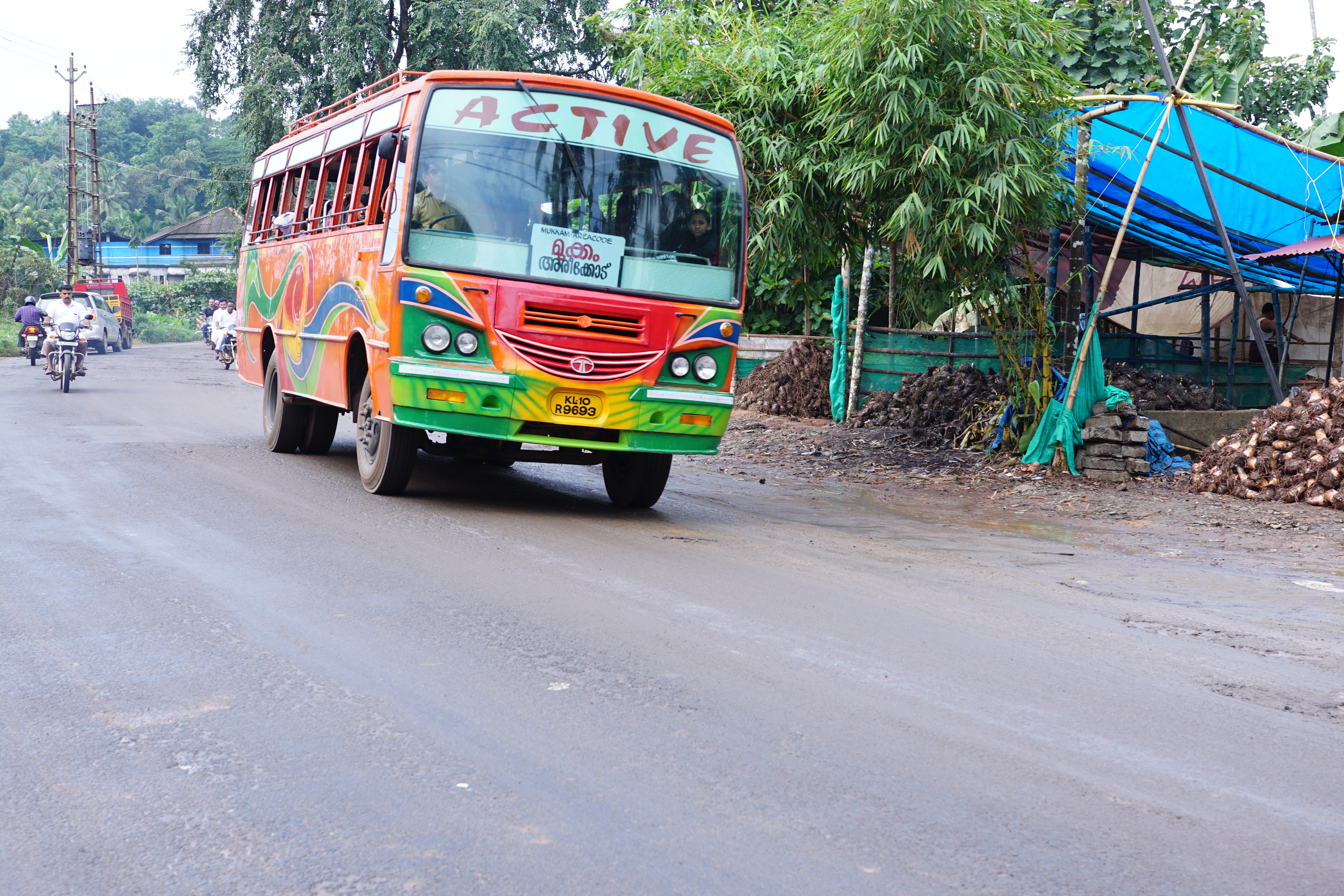
- Karasseri Village

- Location in Kozhikode, Kerala, India Karassery (India)
- Country: India
- State: Kerala
- District: Kozhikode
- Established: 1805

Government
  - MP: Rahul Gandhi - Wayanad (Lok Sabha constituency)
  - MLA: Linto Joseph - Thiruvambady (Assembly constituency)

Languages
  - Official: Malayalam, English
- Time zone: UTC+5:30 (IST)
- PIN: 673602
- Telephone code: 0495 229....
- Vehicle registration: KL 57
- Sex ratio: 1000:1040 ♂/♀
- Literacy: 96%
- Website: www.karassery.com

Karassery is a village and one of the suburbs in the south - eastern side of Kozhikode district in Kerala. Nearby places are Mukkam, Thiruvambady, Koodaranji and Kodiyathur. One of the most famous business place of 1970's in Kozhikode. More than 100 loads of Forest Woods were shipped to Kallai (calicut) through Iruvanjippuzha river on every week. The nearest town is mukkam and it has close ties with mukkam for shopping, entertainment etc. Iruvanjippuzha river separates both places.

== Notable people ==
- M. N. Karassery, writer
