= Mavoor =

- Town
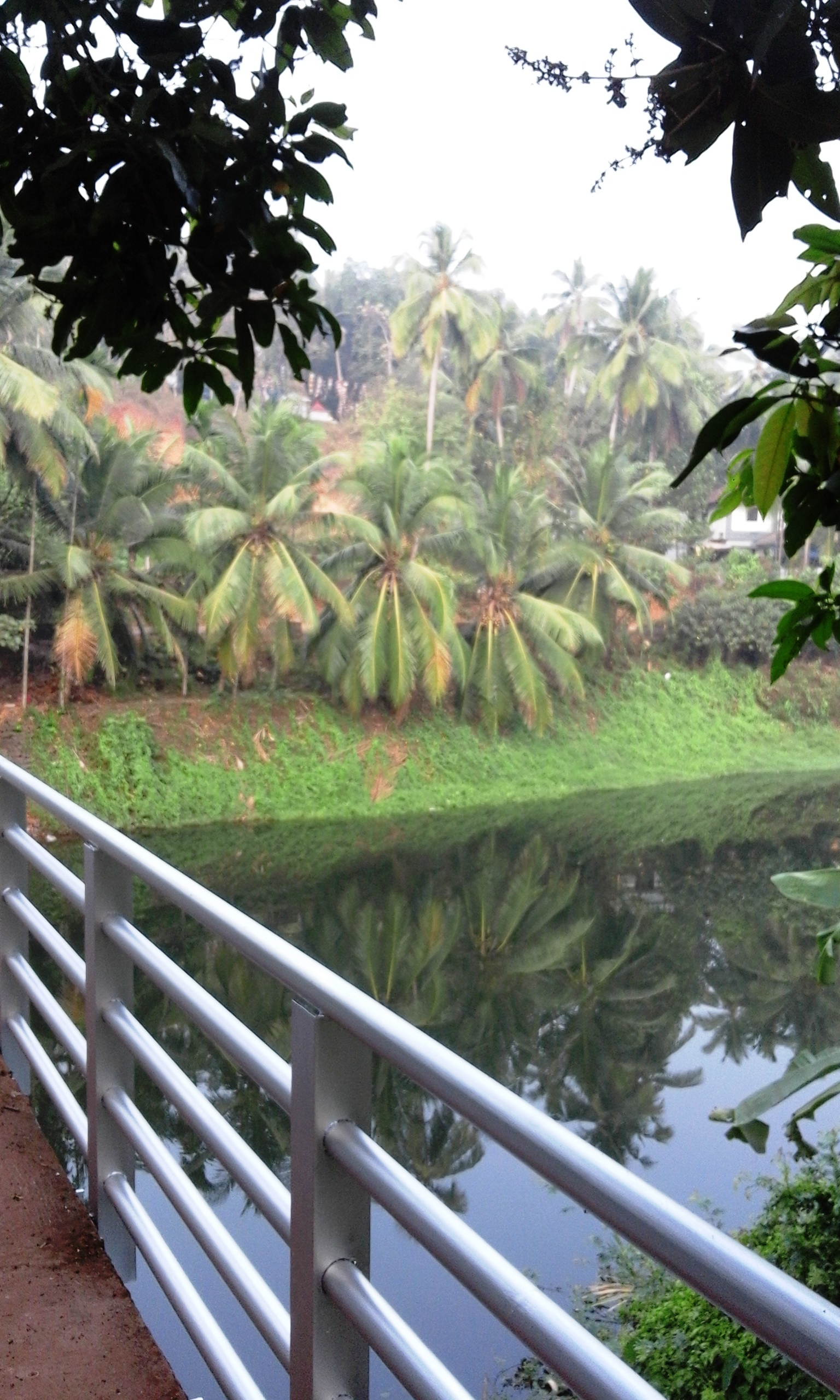
- Nochikkad Kadavu Bridge, Mavoor
- Interactive map of Mavoor
- Coordinates: 11°15′35″N 75°56′55″E
- Country: India
- State: Kerala
- District: Kozhikode

Population (2001)
  - Total: 29,781

Languages
  - Official: Malayalam, English
- Time zone: UTC+5:30 (IST)
- PIN: 673661
- Telephone code: 0495 288
- Vehicle registration: KL 11
- Sex ratio: 1:1 ♂/♀
- Website: www.mavoorpanchayath.com

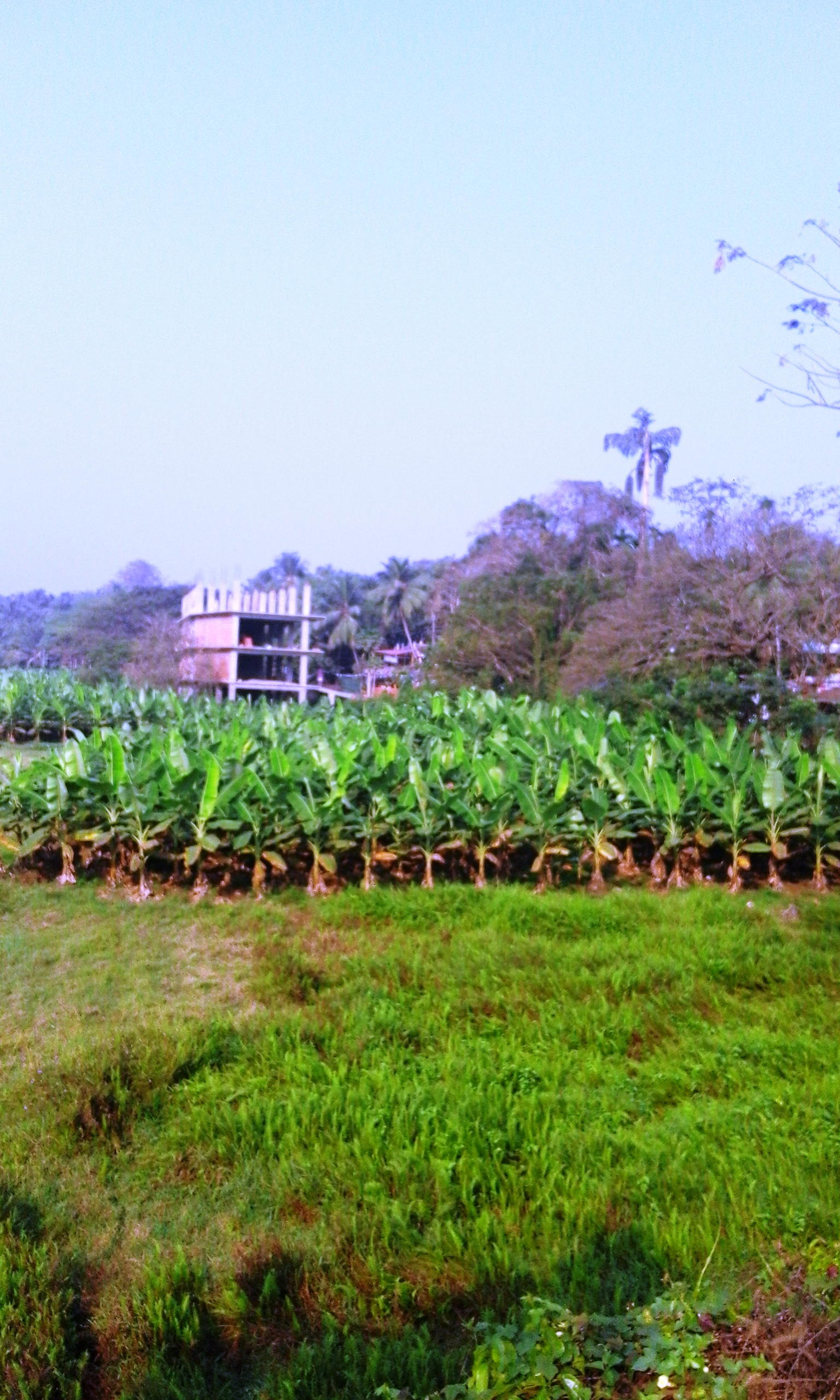
Cheruppa village, Mavoor

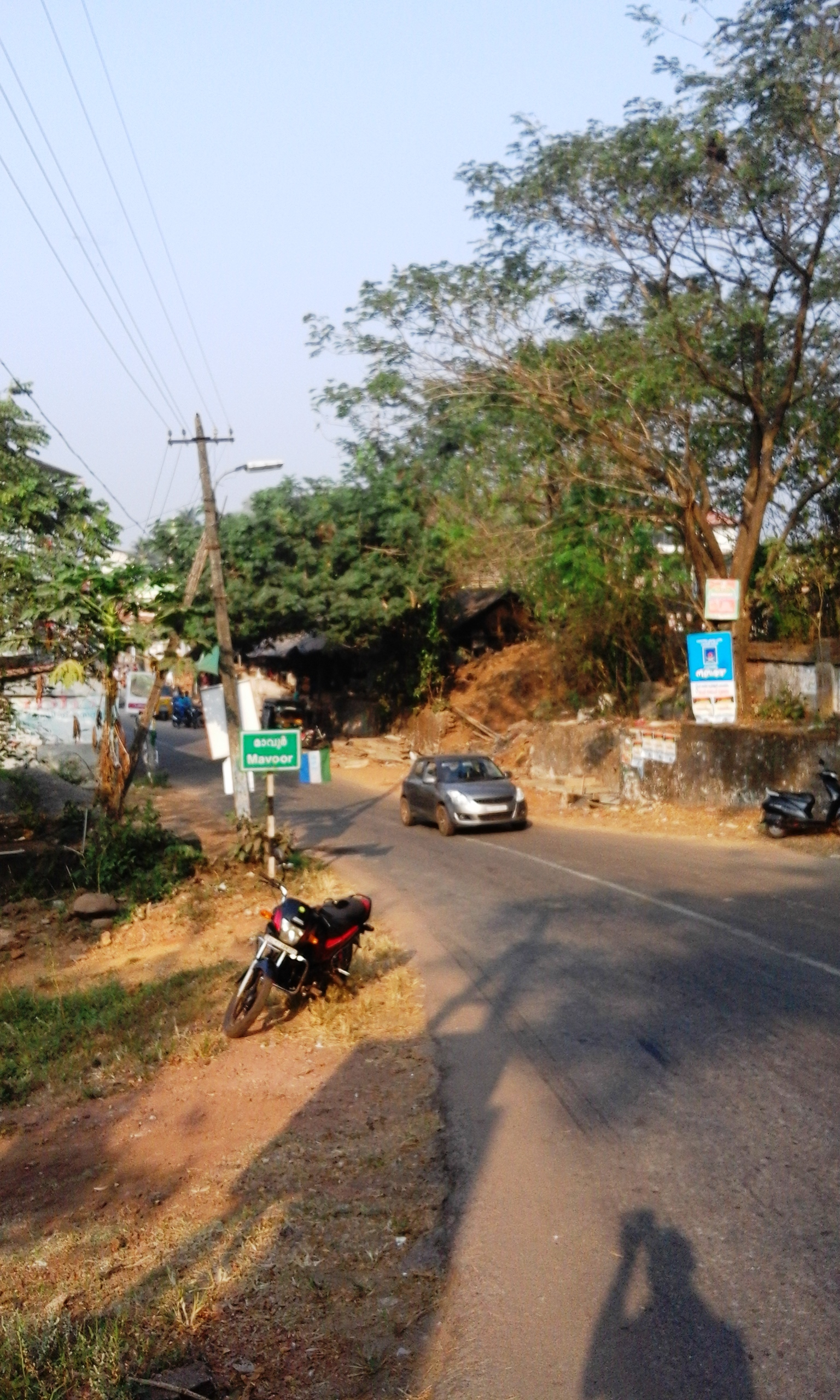
Mavoor-Mukkam Road

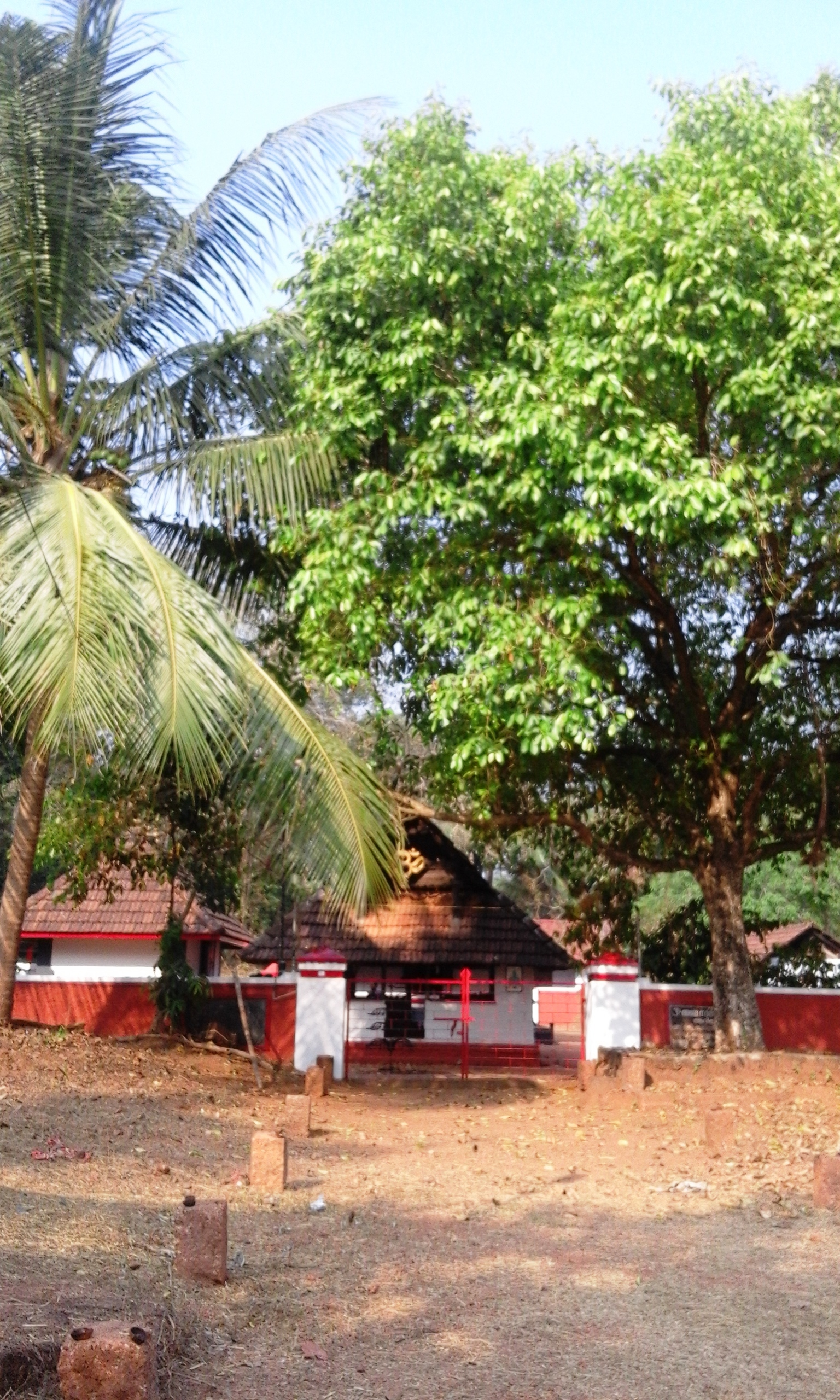
Peruvayal Temple

Mavoor is a town in the Kozhikode district of Kerala, India. It is located 19 km from Kozhikode city.

== Etymology ==
The former name of Mavoor was Pulpparambu, or "hayfields" in Malayalam, as grass for thatching houses was stored in this town. (In Malayalam, pul means "grass/hay", and parampu means "field".)

== Geography ==
Mavoor is located 21 km east of Kozhikode city, beside the Chaliyar River.

== Grasim factory ==
Until the 1960s, Mavoor was like any other village in Kerala. During the 1963s the industrial house of Birla established a factory named "'Gwalior Rayons'" (later renamed as Grasim) at Mavoor for producing pulp and fibre on 316 acres of land. An integrated township with schools, a hospital, and a police station also came up. The arrival of Gwalior Rayons caused a rapid change in the area.

In 1985 Grasim shut down for three years. The disruption caused to the local economy was significant. 11 suicides in Mavoor were attributed to this. In 1988, the Government of Kerala offered more concessions to the management and the factory was re-opened by the management.

The factory faced many protests as it turned out to be a heavily polluting unit. The management avoided the use of any pollution control measures, citing profitability concerns. A large quantity of pollutants produced by Grasim ended up in the Chaliyar river which flows beside the factory. The thick effluents recklessly released by the factory were identified as poisonous. The factory was also a serious air polluter. The impact of the pollution could be seen in the every aspect of the town. Cases of asthma and other respiratory diseases shot up. There was a marked decline in the fish population. Thousands of dead fish and other aquatic animals surfaced from the Chaliyar river. Environmental organizations started agitations focusing on this aspect of the factory.

E N Peethambaran master was a significant figure who worked for restoration of the environmental cleanliness, as well as ensuring justice to the workers of the factory. A series of labour strikes and heightened trade union was also witnessed at the plant. All these factors contributed to the shutdown of Gwalior Rayons in 2001. (See also the first environmental movement in Kerala.) The closure of the factory caused the loss of employment of around 3000 people.

== Future plans ==
386 acres of land is still owned by the Birla group of companies in Mavoor town. The government can utilize this land for the development of Mavoor town. However, the control of the land is still vested with the Birla management. The Kerala Government is planning to build another industrial hub in Mavoor which will be an eco-friendly project. This area is also considered ideal for the setting up of the AIIMS hospital, considering the availability of the required amount of land in the vicinity of an abundant freshwater source - the Chaliyar. The land is also suitable for industrial park, sports village, business park and educational institutions. Moreover, Mavoor, owing to the previous presence of a factory, is fully equipped to house big installations and organizations...

== Culture ==
Many temples, mosques and churches are situated in the nearby places. Kalchira Sree Narasimha Moorthy Kshethram, kanniparambu Siva kshethram, Mavoor Juma masjid, Valiya Juma masjid, Kalpally Juma masjid, Christ the King Church, and Little Flower Church are the major religious centers in Mavoor.

Arts and sports clubs drive the cultural aspirations of people.

The Mavoor Public Library is on the ground floor of the Grama Panchayath Office.

== Climate ==
The district has a generally humid climate with a hot season extending from March to May. The most important rainy season is during the south west monsoon, which sets in the first week of June and extends up to September. In June and July, most of the places suffer the threat of floods.

== Demographics ==
Mavoor panchayat population
Year	Pop.	±%
1981	24,165	—
1991	26,144	+8.2%
2001	27,845	+6.5%
2011	29,781	+7.0%
Source: Census of India

As of 2001 India census, Mavoor had a population of 27,843. Males constitute 50% of the population and females 50%. Mavoor has an average literacy rate of 82%, higher than the national average of 59.5%: male literacy is 85%, and female literacy is 79%. In Mavoor, 13% of the population is under 6 years of age.

== Suburbs of Mavoor ==
The suburbs of Mavoor are Kuttikkadu, Valayanoor, Kuniyankadavu, Chittari Pilakkal, Thathoor, Koolimad, Cheruvadi, Kodiyathur, Kettungal, Ayamkulam, Kacherikunnu, Kanniparamba, Cherupa, Kuttikadave, Valayanoor, Peruvayal, Cheruppa, Thengilakkadavu, Kalleri, Manakkad, Kolakkott Thazham, Kalpally and Parammal.

== Educational institutions ==
Some of the educational institutes are Mavoor GMUP school, GHSS Mavoor, Mahlara Public school (CBSE), Mahlara Arts & Science College, Crescent English school, St. Mary's English Medium School Aduvad AUP school, GUP school, Arayancode ALP school, ALP School Kanniparamba, Govt UP School Manakkad, Cheruppa and Govt LP School Nechikkad, Cherooppa.

== See also ==
- Kunnamangalam
- Cheruvadi
- kodiyathur
- Thamarassery
- Thiruvambady
- Mukkam
- Koduvally
- Elamaram
- Manasheri
- Pannicode
