= Omassery =

- Town
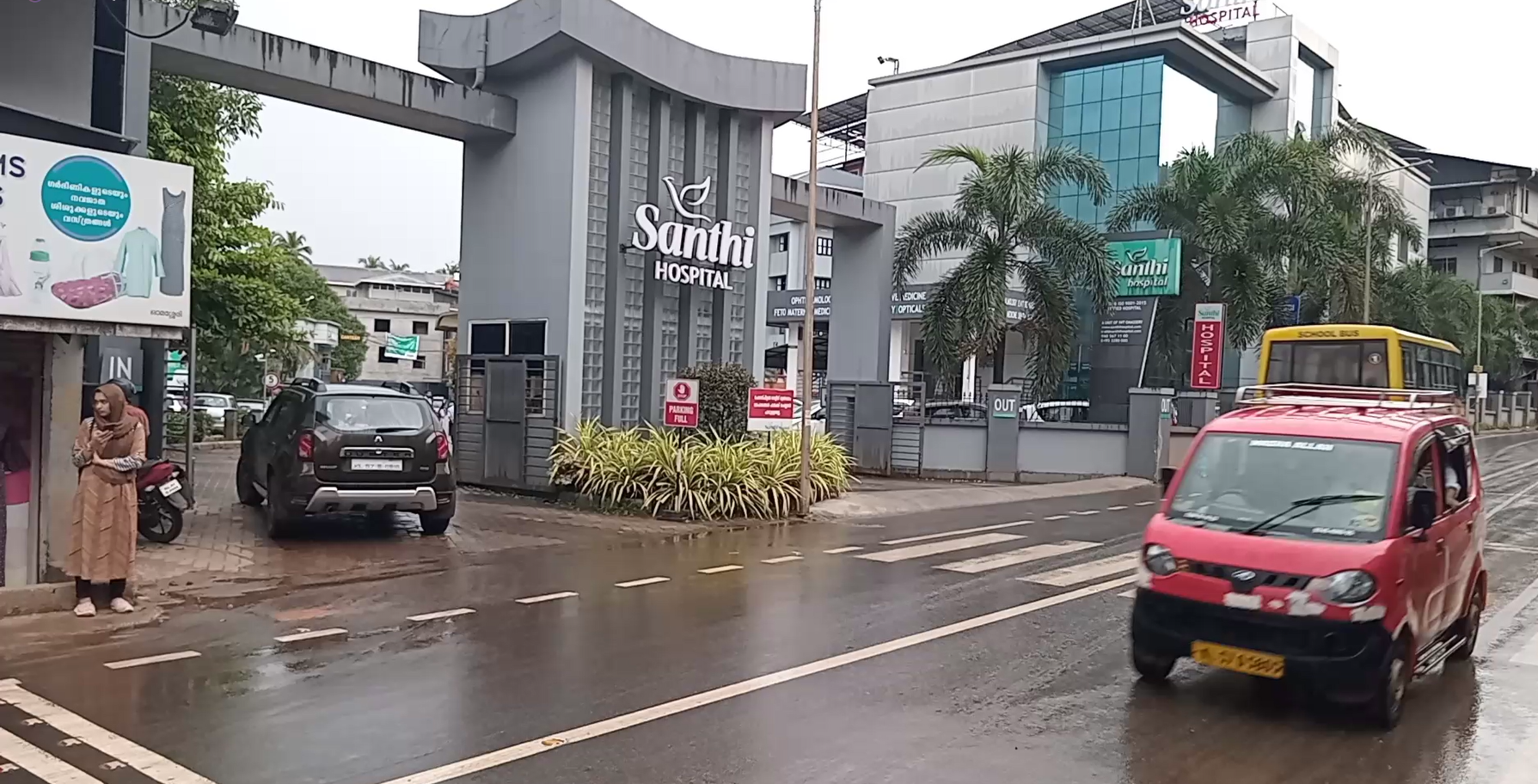
- Omassery
- Interactive map of Omassery
- Coordinates: 11°18′0″N 75°58′30″E
- Country: India
- State: Kerala
- District: Kozhikode
- Lok Sabha constituency: Kozhikode

Government
  - Body: Omassery
  - Member of Parliament: M. K. Raghavan
  - M.L.A: M. K. Muneer
  - Panchayath President: [[BASHEER PURAYIL} ]]

Area
  - Total: 25.46 km^{2} (9.83 sq mi)

Population (2011)
  - Total: 25,420
  - Density: 998/km^{2} (2,580/sq mi)

Languages
  - Official: Malayalam, English
- Time zone: UTC+5:30 (IST)
- PIN: 673582
- Telephone code: 91495228
- Vehicle registration: KL-57
- Nearest city: Kozhikode, koduvally
- Sex ratio: 1000:1032 ♂/♀
- Literacy rate: 88.05%

Omassery is a town in Kozhikode district, Kerala, India and it is a junction between Thiruvambady, Thamarassery, Mukkam, Koduvally, Kodenchery and Kattangal. Omassery is located 29 kilometers southeast of Kozhikode in the eastern part of Kerala; better known as Malabar (Northern Kerala). Omassery is a fast developing place and is well connected to the other parts of the state. Besides that, it is known as the gateway to the hill ranges of Western Ghats in Malabar.

== Geography ==
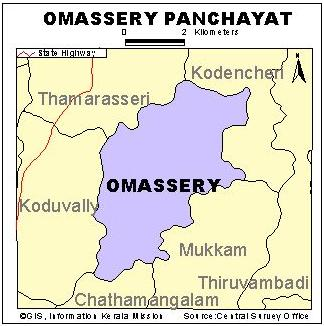
Omassery in relation to its neighbouring local government areas

Omassery is located at 11°18′0″N 75°58′30″E. The total area of the Panchayat is 25.46 square kilometres (9.83 sq mi)

== Demographics ==
As of 2001 census the total population of the panchayat is 25,420, which constitute 12511 Males and 12909 females. The population density is 998 per km^{2} which is more than the state average. The sex ratio is 1000:1032. The literacy rate is 88.05 (Male: 93.62 and female 82.76).

== Towns and suburbs of Omassery ==
Koduvally, Kunnamangalam, Thamarassery, Mukkam, Thiruvambady, Kodenchery, NIT(REC)

Koodathai, Venappara, Neeleswaram, Ambalakkandy, Vennakode, Malayamma, Velimanna, Kallurutty, Puthur, north puthur Nadammal Poyil and Manipuram.

== Panchayath Wards and present members ==
Omassery Panchayath consists of 19 wards. In ward number order, with ward, member name and party indicated:

1. Koodathai Shyni (Koodahai)
2. Kakkadakunnu Shyni Babu (CPIM)
3. Chemmaruthai Manu E J (INC)
4. Peruvilly Gracy (INC)
5. Korothiri Girija Sumod Kumar (CPIM)
6. Omassery EAST CA Ayisha Teacher (Independent)
7. Omassery WEST P.V. Abdu Rahiman Master (IUML)
8. Ambalakkandy yoonus ambalakkandy (IUML)
9. Allumthara ashokan (IUML)
10. Vennakkode C.K. Kkadeeja Muhammed (IUML)
11. NadammalPoyil M.C. Rafeenathulukhan (IUML)
12. Kaniyarkandam Paranghottil Ibrahim (INDEPENDENT)
13. Kulathakkara Sainudheen Bappu (IUML)
14. Velimanna Thatha (IUML)
15. Puthur. Abdul Nasar Pulikkal (IUML)
16. Mangad WEST Chandramathi Puthanpurayil (CPIM)
17. Mangad EAST Sre Eba Areekkal (CPIM)
18. Chakkikave T.T. Mandjkumar (CPIM)
19. Meppally K.K. Radakrishnan (CPIM)

== Major institutions ==
1. Al irshad Arts And Science, College Thechyad Omassery
2. G U P S Puthur
3. Wadihuda Higher Secondary School (Unaided), Omassery
4. Al Irshad Technical Higher Secondary School, Techyad Omassery
5. Vidya Poshini ALP School, Omassery
6. Vadihuda English School (CBSE), Omassery
7. Al Irshad Central School (English Medium), Techyad Omassery
8. Al Irshad High School (Malayalam Medium), Techyad Omassery
9. Al Irshad Industrial School, Techyad Omassery
10. Santhi School of Nursing, Omassery
11. Santhi Paramedical Training Centre, Omassery
12. hayathul islam madrasa vellaramchalil
13. Wadihuda Arabic College, Omassery
14. Pleasant English School Omassery
15. Pleasant Arts College., Omassery
16. Al Irshad Women's College, Techyad Omassery
17. Vadihuda Orphanage & Destitute Home, Omassery
18. Ansarul islam sunni madrassa puthur
19. Izzathul Islam Madrassa, Omassery
20. Winpoint Guidance Academy, Omassery
21. Santhi College of Nursing, Omassery
22. G.M.U.P. School Velimanna Omassery
23. Sunanul Huda Madrasa, Omassery
24. Badrul Huda Madrasa, Thazhe Omassery
25. Al Madrasathul Islamiya, Omassery
26. G.M.L.P. School Kedayathur
27. Holy Family Venappara
28. St. Mary's Higher Secondary School Koodathai
29. Almanar Arabic College Omassery
30. Track College Omassery
31. DELTA PLUS INSTITUTE OF SCIENCE

== Nonprofit organisations ==
- Karma Disaster Management Team, Omassery, a group who are ready in need in any emergency situations.
- Sevana Charitable Society, Omassery
- Shihab Thangal Memorial Charitable Trust (SMCT), Omassery
- CMCO GCC, Cholakkal Mahall Charity Omassery, an initiation by 200+ peoples from Omassery Cholakkal Mahall who works in GCC countries
- Karunyam, a charity initiative by youths in Omassery.
- Karuna Charitable Society
- Youth Wing Puthoor
- Sukrutham, a charity initiative by Santi Hospital Omassery for the Kidney patients of the underprivileged sections of the society whose numbers are increasing day by day. Since its inception in May 2008 m ore than 2000 dialysis have been conducted out of which 68% received concession.
- Pain and Palliative Care Clinic, a clinic guided by the Pain and Palliative Society of Calicut, Government Medical College was incepted in the year 2003, until now more than 250 patients have been registered in the clinic and among them about 55% were cancer patients.

== Hospitals ==
- Santhi Hospital Omassery, a 300 bedded hospital multi-specialty hospital. The hospital facilities reach an approximate population of over 10 lakh spread over 375 km^{2} (145 sq mi).
- Govt. Community Health Centre, Omassery
- Govt. Ayurveda Dispensary, Omassery (Koodathai Bazar)
- Govt. Homeo Dispensary, Omassery
- Govt. Veterinary Hospital Thazhe Omassery

== Other clinics ==
- Taj Yunani Clinic, Omassery
- Similiya Homeo Clinic, Omassery
- Dr Sudhir's Clinic, Thazhe Omasseri
- Calicut Center for Advanced Mental Health Care and Psychotherapy, Venappara
- Nagarjuna Ayurveda Oushadhasala, Omassery
- Good Life Ayurveda clinic Thazhe Omassery
- Darussyifa Ayurveda clinic Omassery
- Mother's Clinic Koduvally road Omassery
- Dr Mohandas evening clinic
- Areekyal Vaidhyar

== Banks ==
- Esaf Bank Omassery
- Federal Bank, Omassery
- Kerala Gramin Bank, Omassery
- Kerala Bank, Omassery
- Omassery Merchantile co-operative Bank Omassery
- Omassery Regional Agriculture Society Omassery
- Omassery Service Co-Op. Bank
- Omassery Urban Society Bank Omassery
- State Bank Of India, Omassery

== Non-banking financial companies ==
- Manappuram Finance Omassery
- Muthoot Fincorp Omassery
- Koshamattam finance Omassery
- MAXVALUE Credits and Investment Omassery

== Religious places ==
- Puthur juma masjid pananghadam kunnath
- vellaramchalil juma masjid
- Anwarul Islam Masjid Omassery
- Chokur Sree Rama Temple
- Cholakkal Juma Masjid, Omassery
- Holy Family Church, Venappara
- Kaniyar Kandam Juma Masjid
- Koovvchalil Masjid
- Nadukil Shiva temple
- Pazhedath Shiva Temple
- Puthur Subrahmanya temple, Mangad
- Rayarukandy Sunni Masjid, Omassery
- Thechyad Juma Masjid
- Velimanna Juma Masjid

== Transport ==
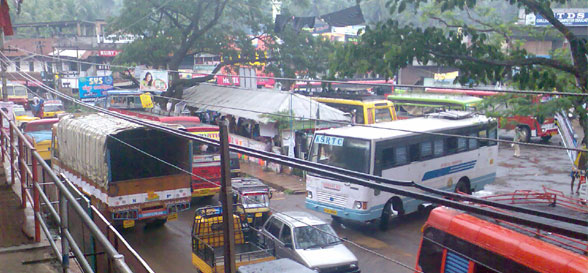
Traffic at Omassery Bus stand

By Air
Calicut International Airport (Karipur), the nearest airport is just 36 kilometres away from this area.
By Train
The nearest Railway station is at Kozhikode.

=== How to reach by road ===
- Thiruvananthapuram - Kochi - Guruvayoor/Thrissur - Pattambi - Perinthalmanna - Manjeri - Areekode - Mukkam - Omassery
- Kozhikode - Kunnamangalam - REC (NIT) / Koduvally - Omassery
- Koyilandy - Thamarassery - Omassery
- Wayanad - Adivaram - Thamarassery - Omassery
- Nilambur - Areekode - Mukkam - Omassery
- Thusharagiri - Kodenchery - Omassery
- Kakkadampoyil - Koombarakoodaranji - Thiruvambady - Omassery

Omassery is the crossing of State Highways Koyilandy - Edavanna and Kappad-Thusharagiri-Adivaram. The location is well connected by roads from various corners and is a main junction for surrounding various panchayaths and villages. Moreover, it gives more geographical importance to this place as this is an important gateway to the hill ranges of western Ghat of Malabar. Thiruvambady, Thamarassery, Koduvally, Mukkam and Kodencheri are near by places of Omassery.

There is one bus stand and bus services available to places such as Kozhikode, Mukkam, Koduvally, Thamarassery, Thiruvambady, Kodenchery, Anakkampoyil.

The Kilometer chart from Kozhikode to Omassery is given below.

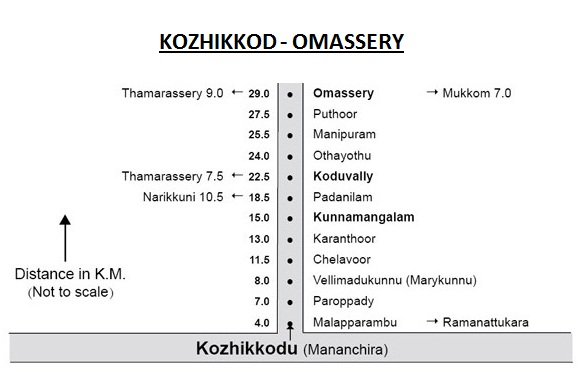
Kozhikode to Omassery Distance Chart

The Kilometer chart through road from Omassery is given below.

Kozhikode - 29 km	Thamarassery - 9 km	Manjeri - 36 km	
Mukkam - 7 km	Malappuram - 48 km	Ernakulam - 190 km	Guruvayur - 115 km
Perinthalmanna - 60 km	Areekode - 20 km	Palakkad - 122 km	
Thiruvambady - 6 km	Thrissur - 133 km	Anakkampoyil - 19 km	
Koduvally - 6 km	Koyilandy - 37 km	Thiruvananthapuram - 414 km	
Kodencheri - 10 km	Kalpetta - 58 km	Nilambur - 50 km	

== Image gallery ==
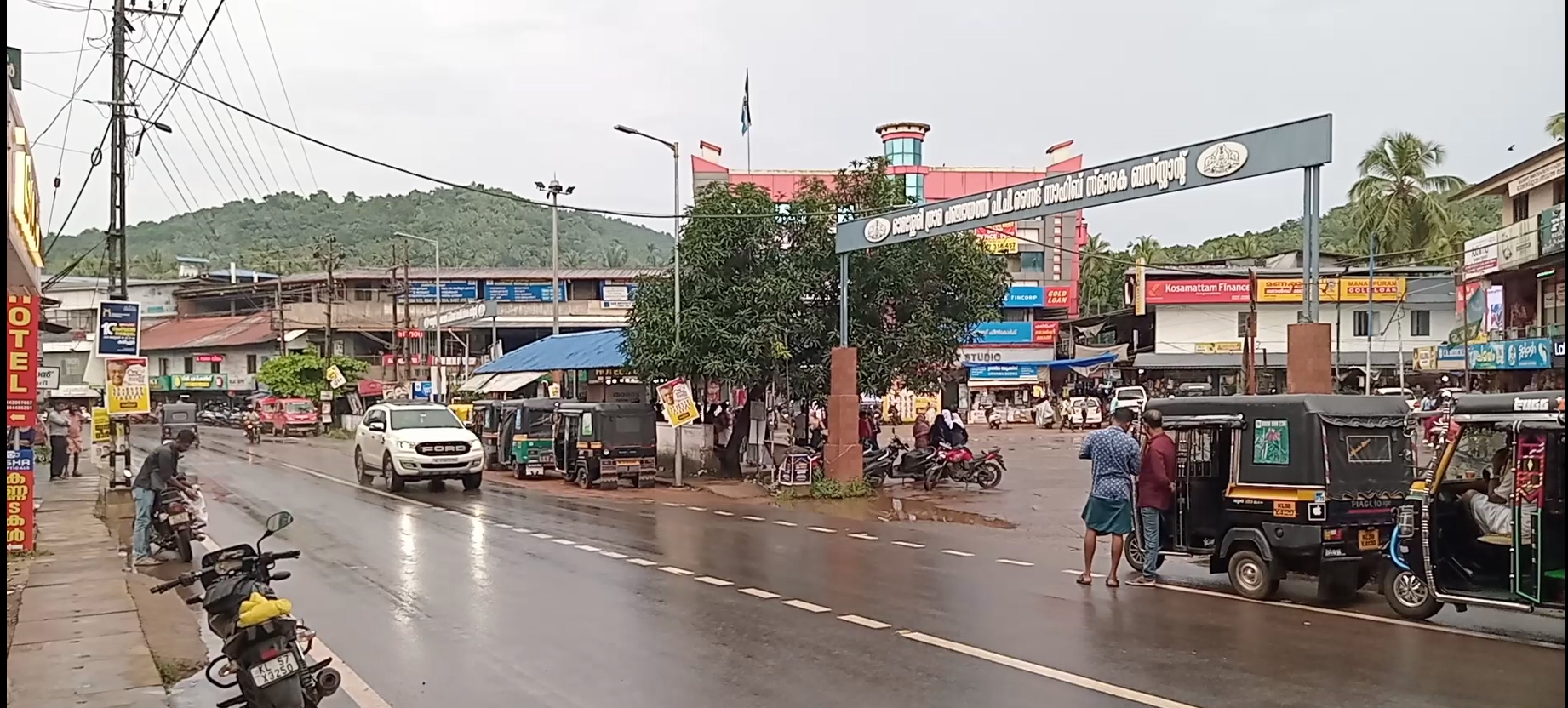

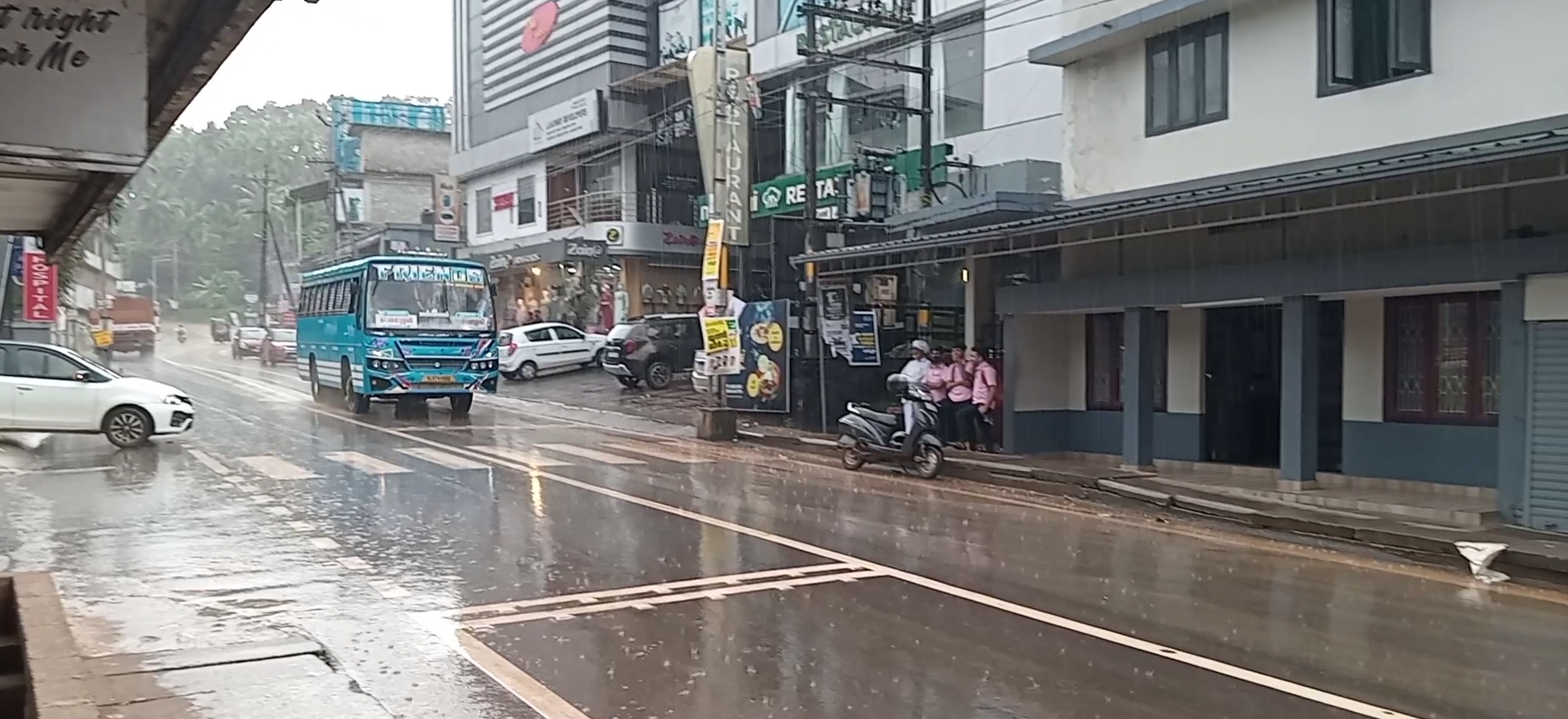

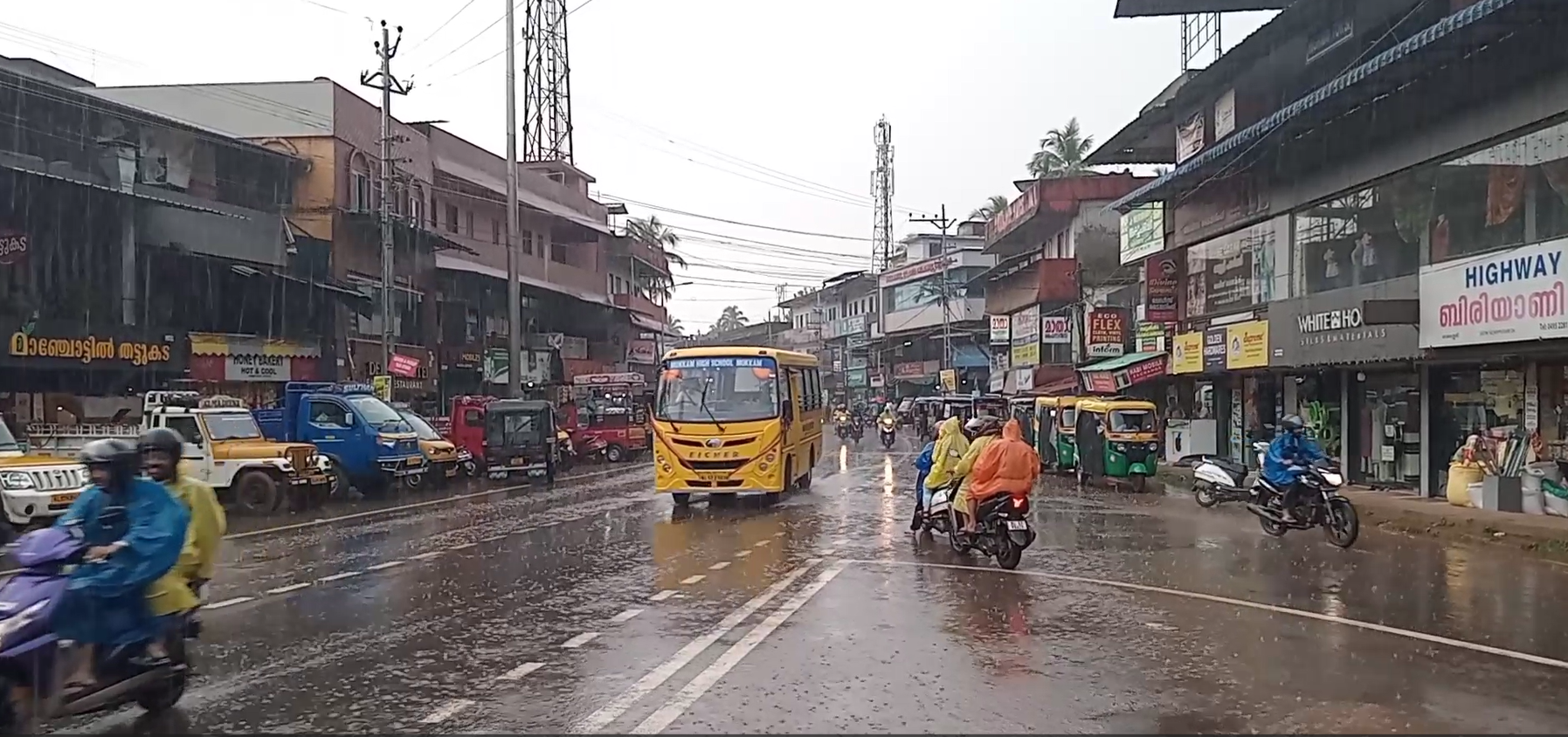

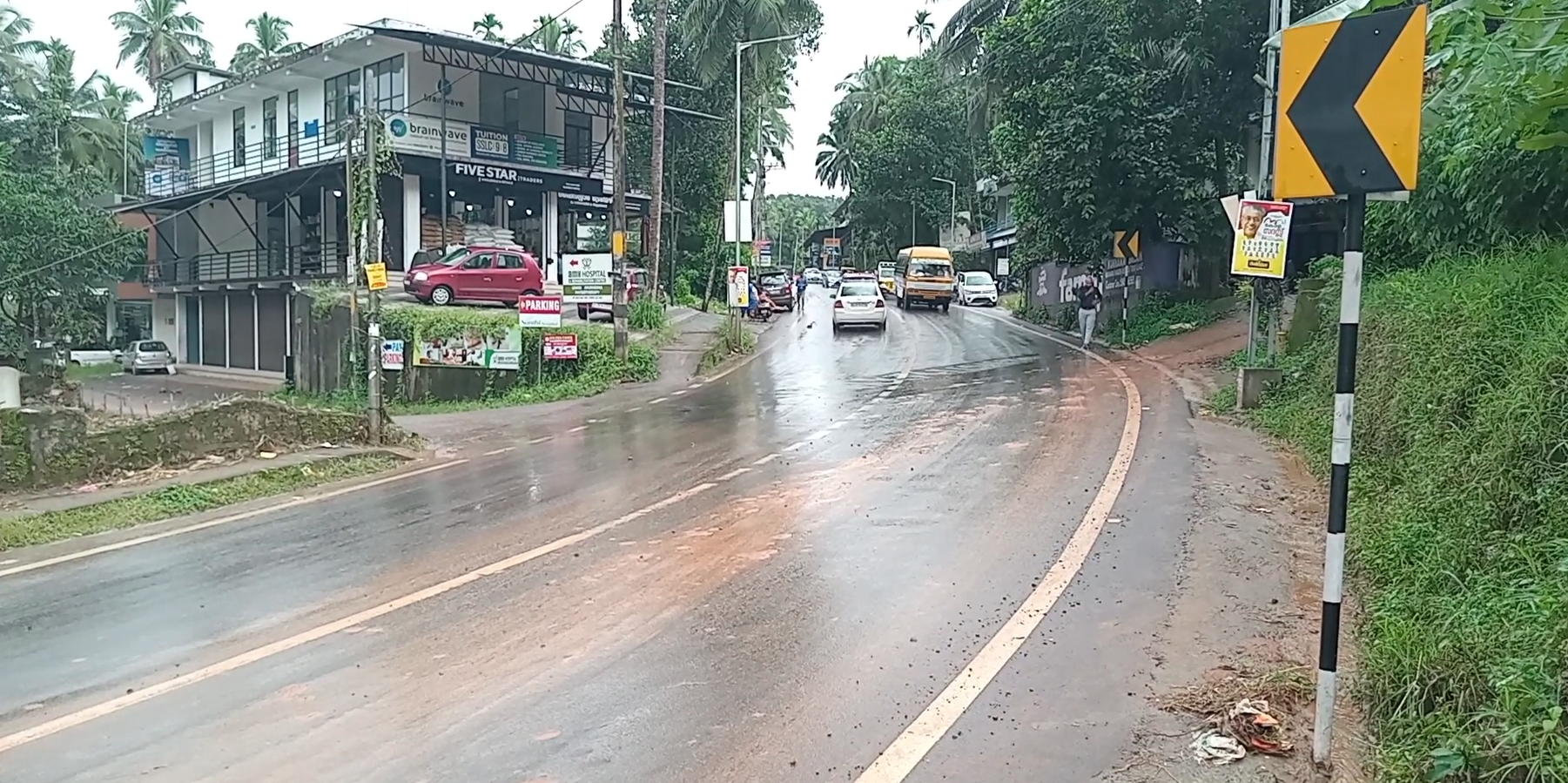

== See also ==
- Aripara Falls
- Thusharagiri Falls
