= Kodiyathur =

- village
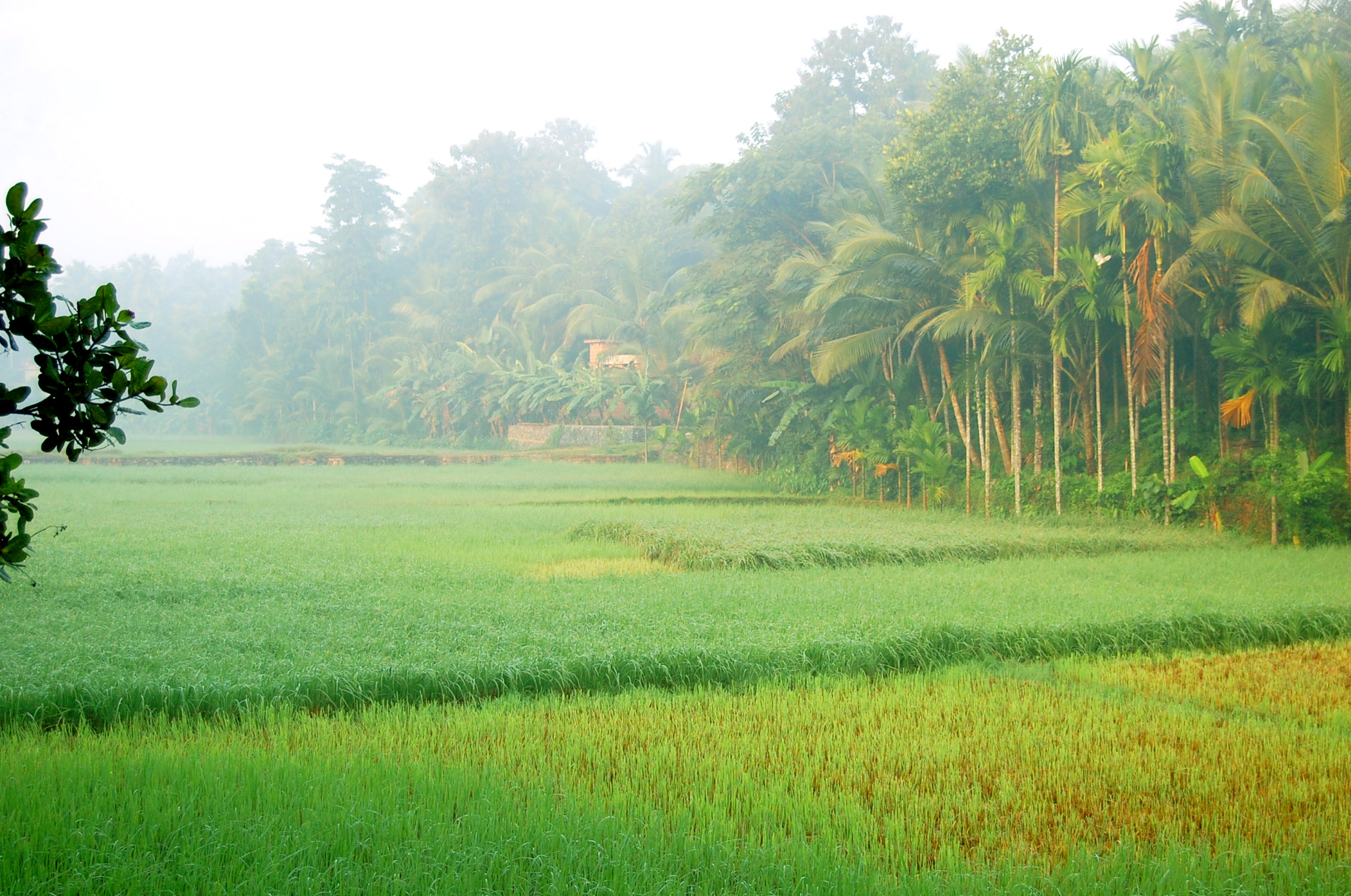
- Kodiyathoor
- Interactive map of Kodiyathur
- Coordinates: 11°17′15″N 75°59′15″E
- Country: India
- State: Kerala
- District: Kozhikode

Population (2011)
  - Total: 29,816

Languages
  - Official: Malayalam, English
- Time zone: UTC+5:30 (IST)
- PIN: 673602
- Telephone code: +91 495
- Vehicle registration: KL-57
- Nearest city: Calicut
- Lok Sabha constituency: Wayanad
- Vidhan Sabha constituency: Thiruvambadi

Kodiyathur Panchayath is a Grama Panchayath in Kozhikode Taluk of Kozhikode district in the state of Kerala, India.

Kodiyathur is surrounded by two rivers, Chaliyar and Iruvazhinji. It is under Thiruvambady legislative constituency and Wayanad Lok Sabha constituency. The name Kodiyathur comes from "Kodi" Kuthiya "Uru". The Freedom fighter Muhammed Abdur Rahiman died near Kodiyathur. Social worker B. P. Moideen is also from here. Kodiyathur Panchayath is bordered with Mukkam Municipality and Chathamangalam and Karassery Grama Panchayaths of Kozhikode district and Urangattiri, Kizhuparamba and Vazhakkad Grama Panchayaths of Malappuram district.

Kodiyathur Panchayath has higher literacy rate compared to Kerala. In 2011, literacy rate of Kodiyathur Village was 94.82% compared to 94.00% of Kerala. In Kodiyathur Male literacy stands at 96.28% while female literacy rate was 93.43%.

== Demographics ==
As of 2011 Indian Census, the Kodiyathur village has population of 29816 with 14725 males and 15091 females.

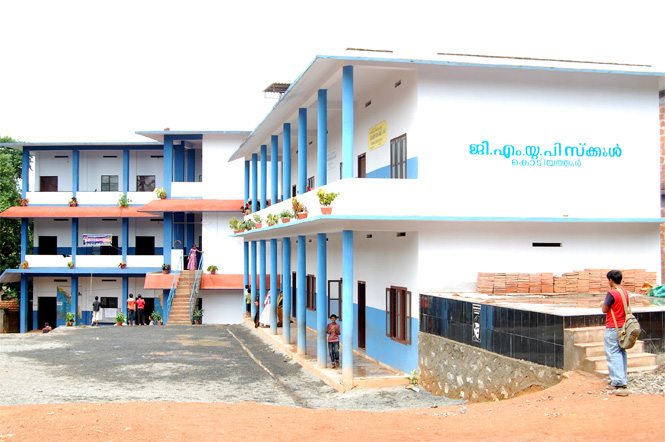
GMUPS Kodiyathur

== Ward Members ==
1. Theyyathumkadavu
2. Karakkutty
3. Mattumury
4. Gothamburoad
5. Thottumukkam
6. Pallithazham
7. Puthiyanidam
8. Eranhimavu
9. Pannicode
10. Uchakavu
11. Karaliparamba
12. Pazhamparambu
13. Pottammel
14. Thenangaparamba
15. Cheruvadi
16. Chullikkaparamba
17. West Kodiyathur
18. South Kodiyathur
19. Kodiyathur

== Educational institutions ==
1. PTM HSS Kodiyathur

2. Govt. HSS Cheruvadi

3. St. Thomas HSS Thottumukkam

4. Wadi Rahma Senior Secondary School

5. Santhom EM School Thottumukkam

6. Govt. UP School Thottumukkam

7. SKA UP School South Kodiyathur

8. Govt. LP School Kazhuthuttippuraya

9. Govt. LP School Pannicode

10. Govt. LP School Chullikkaparamba

11. Govt. Mappila UP School kodiyathur 12. Apex Public School Eranhimavu 13. AUP School Pannicode 14. Govt. LP School Karakutty

== Transportation ==
Road networks and bus routes connect Kodiyathur to nearby towns such as Kunnamangalam, Mukkam, Mavoor, Thiruvambady, Thamarassery, Omassery, Areekode, and Edavannapara. The village connects the other part of India through Calicut city on the west and Kunnamangalam town on the northwest. National Highway No. 66 passes through Kozhikode, and the northern stretch connects Mangalore, Goa, and Mumbai. The southern stretch connects to Cochin and Trivandrum. The National Highway No. 212 that passes through Koduvally connects to Kalpetta, Mysore, and Bangalore. The nearest airport is Calicut International Airport, which is 27 km away. The nearest railway station is Kozhikode Railway Station.

Distance from Kodiyathur

•Mukkam- 4.8 km

•MVR cancer centre- 5 km

•KMCT Mannassery- 5 km

•Mavoor- 6.5 km

•NIT- 7.5 km

•Omassery- 11 km

•Thiruvambady- 10 km

•Koduvally- 14 km

•Kunnamangalam( Via MVR)- 13.2 km

•Areacode-12 km

•Thamarassery- 19 km

•Medical College- 19 Km

== Moral Policing ==
In 2011, a 26-year-old youth was killed by a mob in Kodiyathur for allegedly having an affair with a married woman. All of the accused were sentenced to life imprisonment in October 2014.

== Near by major towns ==
1. Mukkam

2. Areacode

3. Kozhikode

4. Thamarassery

5. Manjeri

6. Kondotty

7. Koduvally

8. Kunnamangalam
