= Urumi 2 Weir =

Dam in Kerala, India

- Location: URUMI, KOZHIKODE
- Coordinates: 11°22′22″N 76°3′30.4″E
- Purpose: Hydro Power Project (Small Hydro Electric Project)
- Status: Operating
- Construction began: 2012
- Opening date: 2016
- Construction cost: USD 20 million

Dam and spillways
- Type of dam: Weir
- Impounds: Poyilinga Puzha
- Height: 6.5 m
- Length: 162 m
- Width (crest): 50 m

Reservoir
- Total capacity: 4 million m³

Power Station
- Turbines: 2
- Installed capacity: 5 MW

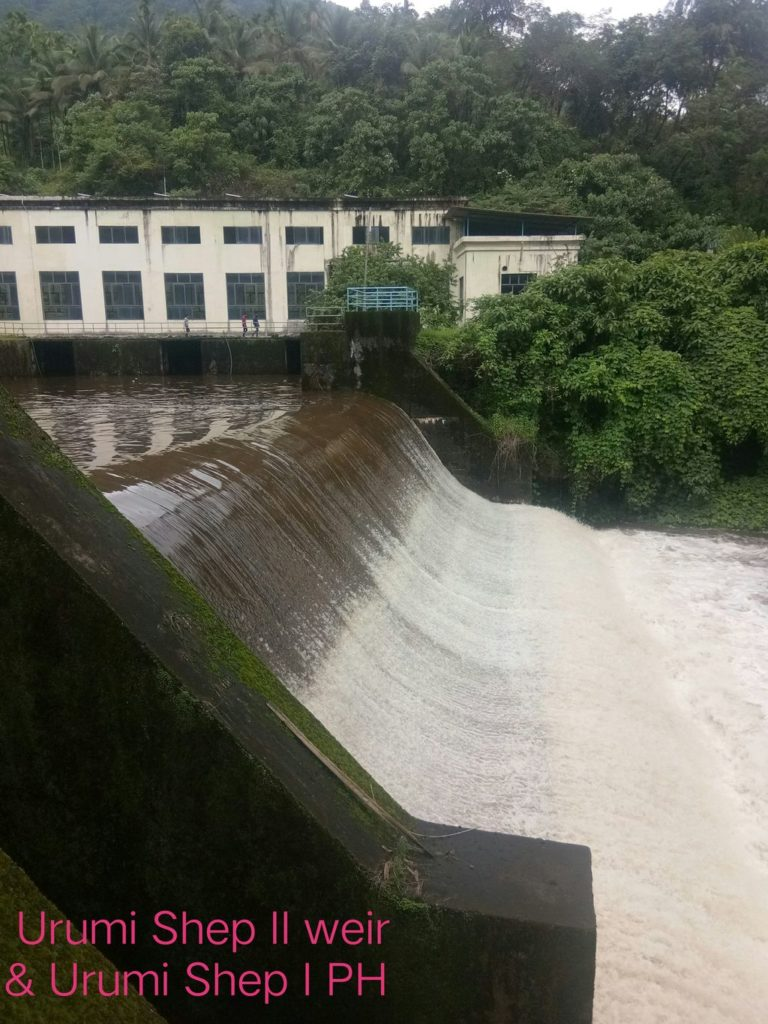
Urumi 2 Weir

Urumi 2 Weir' is a small diversion dam constructed across Poyilingalpuzha in Thiruvambady village of Kozhikode district in Kerala, India. The weir is constructed across the Poyilingalpuzha river, downstream of Urumi I power house to divert water to Urumi II power house. This is located in Thiruvambady, 50 km away from Kozhikode town. The water from the reservoir is drawn to the Power House through a power channel 470 m long. The Urumi falls near the dam has become a tourist attraction after the hydro electric project came into existence.

== Specifications ==
- LocationLatitude:11⁰22’22”N
- Longitude:76⁰3’30.4”E
- Panchayath : Thiruvambady
- Village : Thiruvambady
- District : Kozhikode
- River Basin : Chaliyar
- River : Poyilingalpuzha
- Release from Dam to river
- Taluk through which release flows : Thamarassery
- Year of completion : 2004
- Name of Project : UrumiSHEP Stage II
- Purpose of Project : Hydro Power
- Installed capacity of the Project : 3 x 0.8 MW.

Dam Features

- Type of Dam : Diversion weir
- Classification : Weir
- Maximum Water Level (MWL) : EL 107.1 m
- Full Reservoir Level ( FRL) : EL 107.1 m
- Storage at FRL : Diversion only
- Height from deepest foundation : 5.6m
- Length : 25.0 m
- Spillway : Not provided
- Crest LevelEL 107.1 m
- River Outlet :
- Officers in charge & phone No. : Executive Engineer, KG Division, Kakkayam, PIN-673615 Phone.9446008466
