= Aripara Falls =

Tourist spot in Kozhikode district, Kerala

Coordinates: 11°26′17″N 76°02′47″E

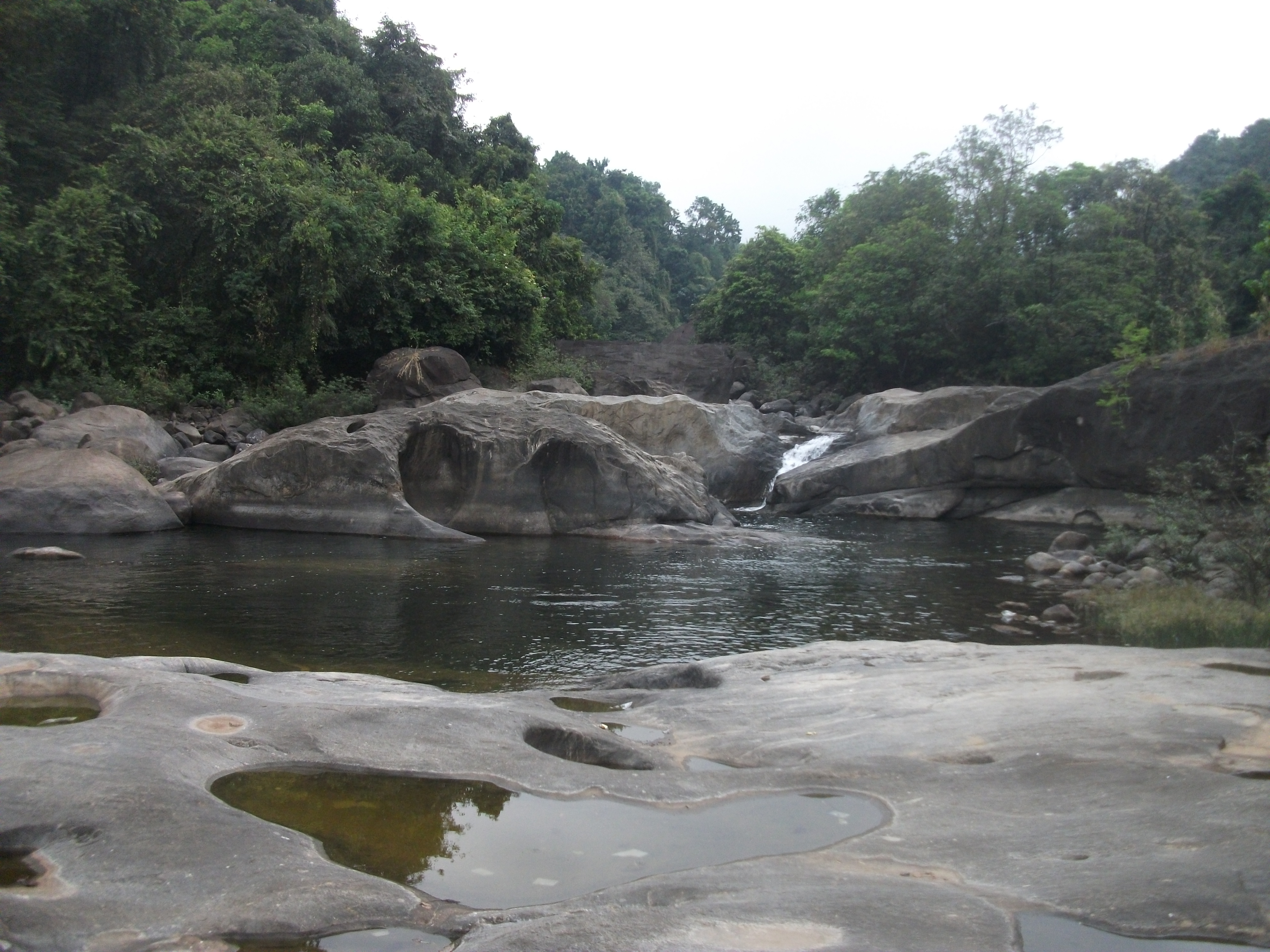
Arippara waterfalls

Aripara Falls [alternate spelling: Arippara Falls (അരിപ്പാറ)] is a tourist spot in Anakkampoyil near Thiruvambady Town in Kozhikode district, Kerala. It is located on the Thiruvambady - Anakkampoyil route, 15 km from Thiruvambadi. The waterfall is a tributary of Iruvanjippuzha. There is a proposal for implementing a hydro power project on the Arippara waterfall.

== Transportation ==
Aripara Falls connects to other parts of India through Calicut city on the west and Thamarassery town on the east. National highway No.66 passes through Kozhikode and the northern stretch connects to Goa and Mumbai. The southern stretch connects to Cochin and Trivandrum. The eastern National Highway No.54 going through Adivaram connects to Kalpetta, Mysore and Bangalore. The nearest airports are at Kannur and Kozhikode. The nearest railway station is at Kozhikode.

== See also ==
- Thusharagiri Falls
- Vellarimala
- Thiruvambady
- Anakkampoyil
