= Peperomia vellarimalica =

Scientific classification
- Kingdom: Plantae
- Clade: Tracheophytes
- Clade: Angiosperms
- Clade: Magnoliids
- Order: Piperales
- Family: Piperaceae
- Genus: Peperomia
- Species: P. vellarimalica

Binomial name
- Peperomia vellarimalica J.Mathew & P.M.Salim

Species of epiphyte

Peperomia vellarimalica is a species of plant from the genus 'Peperomia'. It grows in wet tropical biomes. It was discovered by Jose Mathew and Pichan Salim in 2018. They named it after a nearby Mountain Range in Kerala, India.

== Etymology ==
vellarimalica came from the locality "Vellarimala". This refers to Vellarimala being found in Kerala, India.

== Distribution ==
Peperomia vellarimalica is native to India.

- India
  - Kerala
