= Pulloorampara =

Village in Kozhikkode District, Kerala, India

Pullurampara, is a village situated near the town of Thiruvambady in the Calicut district of the Indian state of Kerala. It is approximately 42 km from Calicut and is in two panchayats, Thiruvambady and Kodencheri. Iruvanjippuzha river flows through Pullurampara. The main junction in Pullurampara is Pullurampara Town Junction.

== Religion ==
Christians, Hindus and Muslims are the main religions in Pullurampara. 48% are Christians, 28% are Muslims, and 24% are Hindus.

It has been the Malabar Christian stronghold who were migrated from Central Kerala. The migration started from early decades of the 20th century and continued well into the 1970s and 1980s. The first organized migration to Malabar was envisaged by the Syro-Malabar Catholic Archeparchy of Kottayam, Knanaya Catholic under the direction of the then Bishop Mar Alexander Chulaparambil in 1943.

Pullurampara Town has two divisions like Papplidapi and Pullurampara.

=== Church ===
St. Joseph's Church in Pullurampara is located in Pullurampara Pallippadi, 900 meters away from Pullurampara began in 1952. It serves as the primary church where Christians worship. Just at the centre of Pallipadi there is a Renewal Centre, Badhaniya Retreat Centre of the Thamarassery Syro-Malabar Catholics Diocese, 1 km away from Pullurampara Town. Pullurampara town has a Chapel(Kurisupalli) at its centre, at the diversion to Anakkampoyil and Punnackal. The church under the leadership of it Priests had been the coordinating entity in the transformation and development of the places in the early decades like building bridges and roads, educational institutions etc.

=== Masjid ===
There is a Sunni Town Masjid in the near visinity. There is also Pullurampara Mahallu Sunni Juma Masjid located in malabar highway,200 meters from pullurampara Town.

=== Sree Narayana Guru Temple ===
Sree Narayana Guru Temple, located at the opening of Kodakkattupara Road, serves as the worship center for Hindus in Pullurampara.

== Landslide ==
On August 6, 2012, a landslide in Pullurampara killed eight people and displaced families. The landslides affected areas including Cherussery Hill and Kodakkatappara Hill.

== Neighboring villages ==
- Pallippadi
- Anakkampoyil
- Punnakkal
- Thottumuzhi
- Nellippoyil
- Mavathukkal

== Rivers ==
- Iruvanjippuzha
- Mulankadavu
