= Abhinayam =

- Directed by: Baby
- Written by: Baby
- Screenplay by: Baby
- Produced by: B. P. Moideen
- Starring: Jayan; Vidhubala; T. Jayasree; Vanchiyoor Radha
- Cinematography: K. B. Dayalan
- Edited by: K. Sankunni
- Music by: K. J. Yesudas; K. Raghavan; Lyrics; Bichu Thirumala
- Production company: Nithya Films
- Distributed by: Nithya Films
- Release date: 20 March 1981
- Country: India
- Language: Malayalam

Abhinayam (transl. Acting) is a 1981 Indian Malayalam film, directed by Baby and produced by B. P. Moideen. The film stars Jayan, Vidhubala, T Jayasree, and Vanchiyoor Radha in the lead roles and has a musical score by K. J. Yesudas and K. Raghavan. During the filming of Abhinayam, Jayan and Moideen became great friends and showed interest to make Moideen's life story as a film. Jayan wanted to play the character of Moideen, and Moideen happily agreed to that. However, after a month, Jayan died in an accident while shooting for the film Kolilakkam.

== Plot ==
Radha is a struggling drama artist living in a hut with her mentally unstable mother. Raghu is a recently widowed bank manager working in the same town. Raghu has a baby daughter who is being taken care of by his in-laws who refuse to give him custody of the child until he remarries. Raghu hatches a plan to get custody of his baby daughter and approaches Radha with a proposal to act as his wife for a few days in return for 5000 Rs.

Raghu takes Radha to his village where they are received by his in-laws. They manage to convince his in-laws that they are married. Radha develops maternal feelings for Raghu's baby daughter. Raghu and Radha also develop feelings for each other. Upon returning to town with the baby daughter, Radha reveals her heart to Raghu. However, Raghu who wants to take care of his daughter himself, refuses to let Radha be part of their life. Radha, disheartened goes back to her home without accepting the remuneration Raghu offered.

Raghu is later confronted by his father-in-law who makes him realize his mistake. Raghu rushes to Radha's hut where he finds that Radha has committed suicide.

== Cast ==
- Jayan as Raghu
- Vidhubala as Radha
- T. Jayasree as Bindu
- Vanchiyoor Radha
- Radhadevi
- Philomina
- Prathapachandran
- Pala Thankam
- Vallathol Unnikrishnan
- mukkam Basi
- Nithyan
- Vinod
- Ravi Patteri
- Abu Sirkar
- Hameed Kodiyatoor
- Venugopal
- Johnson
- Bhagyalakshmi

=== Child Artist ===
- Rajeev
- Rajith
- Salin

== Soundtrack ==
The music was composed by K. J. Yesudas and K. Raghavan and the lyrics were written by Bichu Thirumala and Vijayan.

No.	Song	Singers	Lyrics	Length (m:ss)
1	"Amminjappaalinnilamchundu"	S. Janaki	Vijayan	
2	"Amminjappalinnilamchundu" (Bit)	S. Janaki	Vijayan	
3	"Kadalthedi Ozhukunna Puzhayo"	K. P. Brahmanandan	Vijayan	
4	"Thaalathil Paanamunthiri"	K. J. Yesudas	Bichu Thirumala	
