= Nadammal Poyil =

Village in Kerala, India

Nadammal Poyil is an interior village in Omassery Grama Panchayath in Kozhikode district. This village is midway between Omassery and Koduvally. The Nadammal Poyil town is situated on the shores of Puthoor Puzha (Puthoor River) which flows and joins to Chaliyar Puzha.

A very small, but densely populated Nadammal Poyil is an agriculture oriented village. The changes happened in the new generation of Kerala has the same effect in Nadammal Poyil also.

== Infrastructure ==
The village was deserted from social and infrastructure developments for decades until the late 1980s. Electricity was a dream for the villagers for years and once they had it by end 1980s it was like a bad dream in a dozy fade night. Later on addition of new transformers made things better.

Village roads were always empty as no motorist were willing to risk their investment on so called roads of Nadammal Poyil. It was only the loud calling bicycle ridden fish seller to use the roads. Some bold move of Panchayath representative gave the road finally the black colour and villagers were glee to listen the musical buzz of Kausar and Murali- The first bus services to Nadammal Poyil. It was a great achievement to the pedestrian villagers who struggled to reach their schools and work places. Now number of Mini buses are conducting services through the village. Old farmers remember their days on walk up to Koduvally town to catch buses to Calicut city and their bullock cart transportation of kopra and other harvests to Pandika Shala (wholesale markets of agri products) of Kozhikode town.

== Social life ==
Azad Public Library and Reading Room is an old and still existing social mingling point of Nadammal Poyil. There is a very old Mahallu Masjid and a newly built Sunni Masjid within the Nadammal Poyil Town. Jowhar Salafi Masjid is about half a kilometer away from the village center. Islamic Welfare Trust (IWT), affiliated to IWT Omassery is situated just opposite to the old Kedayathur Lower Primary school. Government Anganvadi (Free Nursery and play school for kids) is one of the oldest institutes in the village and Kamala teacher is inseparable part of the nursery. The nursery was started in a building donated by T.C. Moosakkutty Haji. Free lunch and community support were given from this Anganvadi.

== Agriculture ==
The major part of the village is paddy fields and farm lands. Main plantations include rice, coconut, areca nut, banana, pepper, mango and vegetables. Once the rice harvest is done the paddy fields are given to school going youths and home makers to cultivate fast growing vegetables like lady finger, (okra), tapioca, bitter melon, and peas. This is to impart the culture of farming to the new generation. A part of the fields will become play grounds for young men. Most of the time agri-products are taken to far away Kozhikode city for selling. Men with a white turban and a white lungi carrying agri tools are still a common scene here in this village. People used to make coconut oil at their home for own use. Dairy farming is one of the important among the agribusiness here. Even though not on a large scale, most of the farmers own few number of cows and they make a small living out of this. There is no Krishi Bhavan or a fertilizer depot in the village. Large sections of people lead their life as farm workers by ploughing, harvesting and working in the fields.
