= Mathai Chacko =

Indian politician (1959 – 2006)

Mathai Chacko (12 May 1959 – 13 October 2006) was a politician from Kerala state. He was member of the Kerala Legislative Assembly from 2001 - 2006. He represented the Thiruvambadi constituency of Kerala and was a member of the Communist Party of India (Marxist) (CPI(M)) political party. He became the first elected MLA to take oath outside the Kerala Legislative Assembly, having taken oath at Lake Shore Hospital in Kochi, where he was undergoing treatment for leukemia, on 29 May 2006.

== Political life ==
He entered politics through students movement: was an active worker of Students Federation of India (SFI) and DYFI. He was the secretary of SFI of Devagiri College, Kozhikode unit, Mukkam and Kozhikode area committee, Kozhikode district committee and State committee. Was president of DYFI Kozhikode district committee, Joint secretary, DYFI state committee. He was involved in various agitations led by SFI and DYFI like agitation against privatisation of polytechnic in Kerala state, paralleled college students fare concession struggle etc.

== Personal life ==
Mathai Chacko was born on 12 May 1959 at Thiruvambadi, as the son of A.M Mathai and Smt.Treessia. He was married to Smt.Mercy with one son and one daughter.

== Death ==
Mathai Chacko died on 13 October 2006 at the age of 47 at Lake Shore Hospital in Kochi due to leukaemia. He could not attend any meeting of the 12th Kerala legislative assembly due to his illness. He was cremated with full state honours at the premises of his home.

After Mathai Chacko's death, Paul Chittilapilly, the bishop of the Diocese of Thamarassery claimed that Mathai Chacko had voluntarily accepted the last communion at his deathbed. This sparked controversy as Mathai Chacko was known to be an atheist and a follower of Communist ideology. Following this, Pinarayi Vijayan who was then the state secretary of the communist party made the infamous remark describing the bishop as a "wretched creature". He had said, "Whoever he may be, the person who said that the late Mathai Chacko, who led the pious life of a Communist, had voluntarily accepted the last communion from a priest is only telling a blatant lie, and he is nothing but a wretched creature". Later, the Syro-Malabar Catholic Church protested against the CPI(M) leadership for the comments against the bishop. However, Pinarayi Vijayan repeated the same and stuck to his comments.

== Posts held ==
- Calicut University Union councillor from Devagiri college
- Private secretary to the Minister for Co- operation and Fisheries (1987–91)
- Syndicate Member Calicut University
- MLA Meppayur Assembly Constituency (2001-2006).
- MLA Thiruvambady Assembly Constituency (2006)
