= Anakkampoyil =

- Village
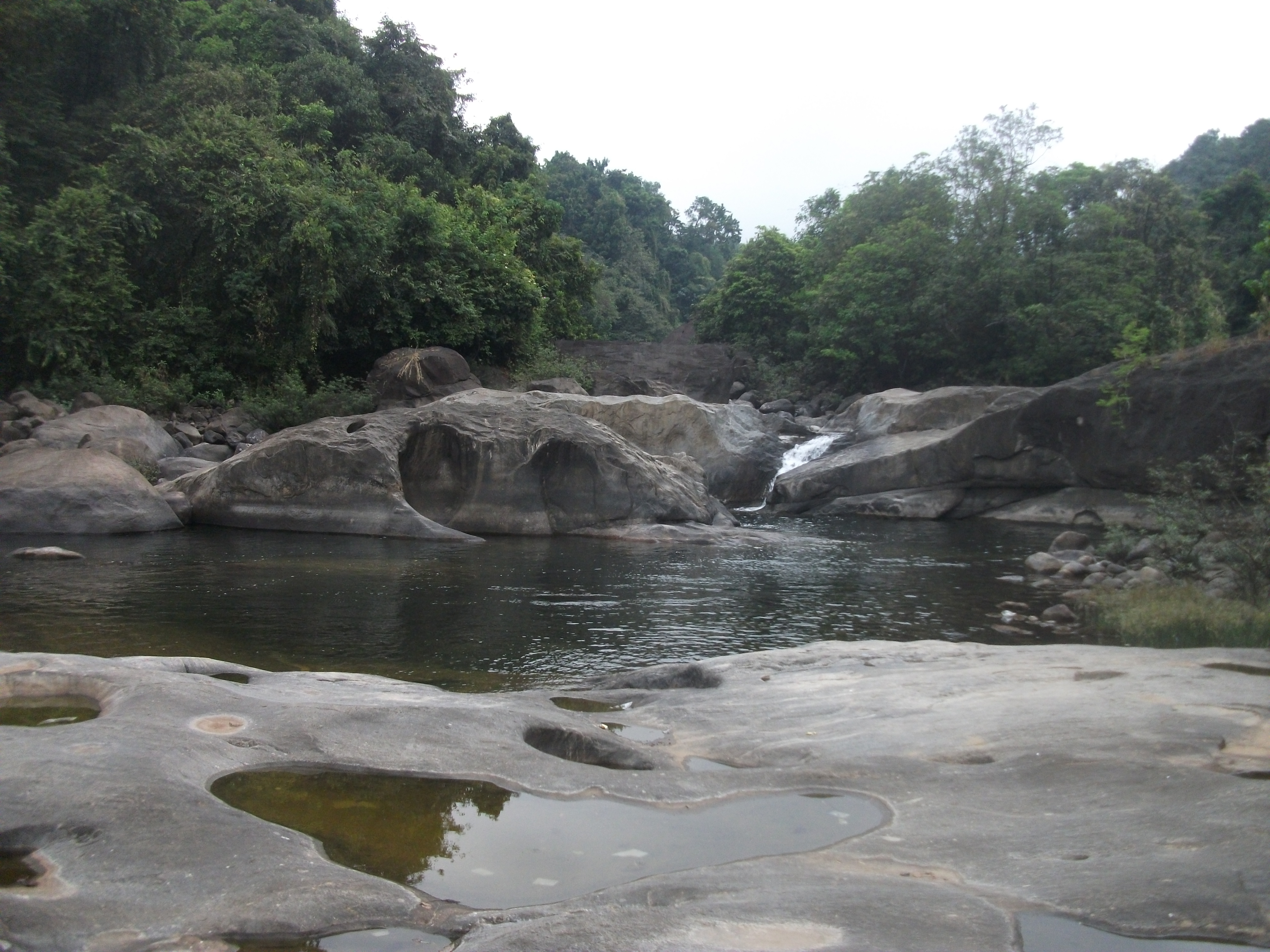
- Aripara Falls

- Location in Kerala, India Anakkampoyil (India)
- Coordinates: 11°26′0″N 76°3′0″E
- Country: India
- State: Kerala
- District: Kozhikode district

Languages
  - Official: Malayalam, English
- Time zone: UTC+5:30 (IST)
- PIN: 673603
- Telephone code: 0495-227, 0495-250
- Vehicle registration: KL-11, KL-57
- Nearest city: Thiruvambady

Anakkampoil is a hill village in Kozhikode district in Kerala, India. It is located about 50 km from Kozhikode and is situated at the foothills of Vellarimala.

With the presence of streams and lush forests in the valleys of green hills, this hidden village is a place away from busy tourist spots. Anakkampoil is rich in valleys, green hills, thick forests, flowing streams and waterfalls. It is known for its atmosphere and warm temperature.

Anakkampoil experiences a mild climate throughout the year. The best time to visit is from September to the end of April. During this period, the natural beauty of forests and streams is at its peak.

It is situated in the hilly valley of Vellarimala. Kadapanchal Bridge and Aripara Falls are nearby attractions

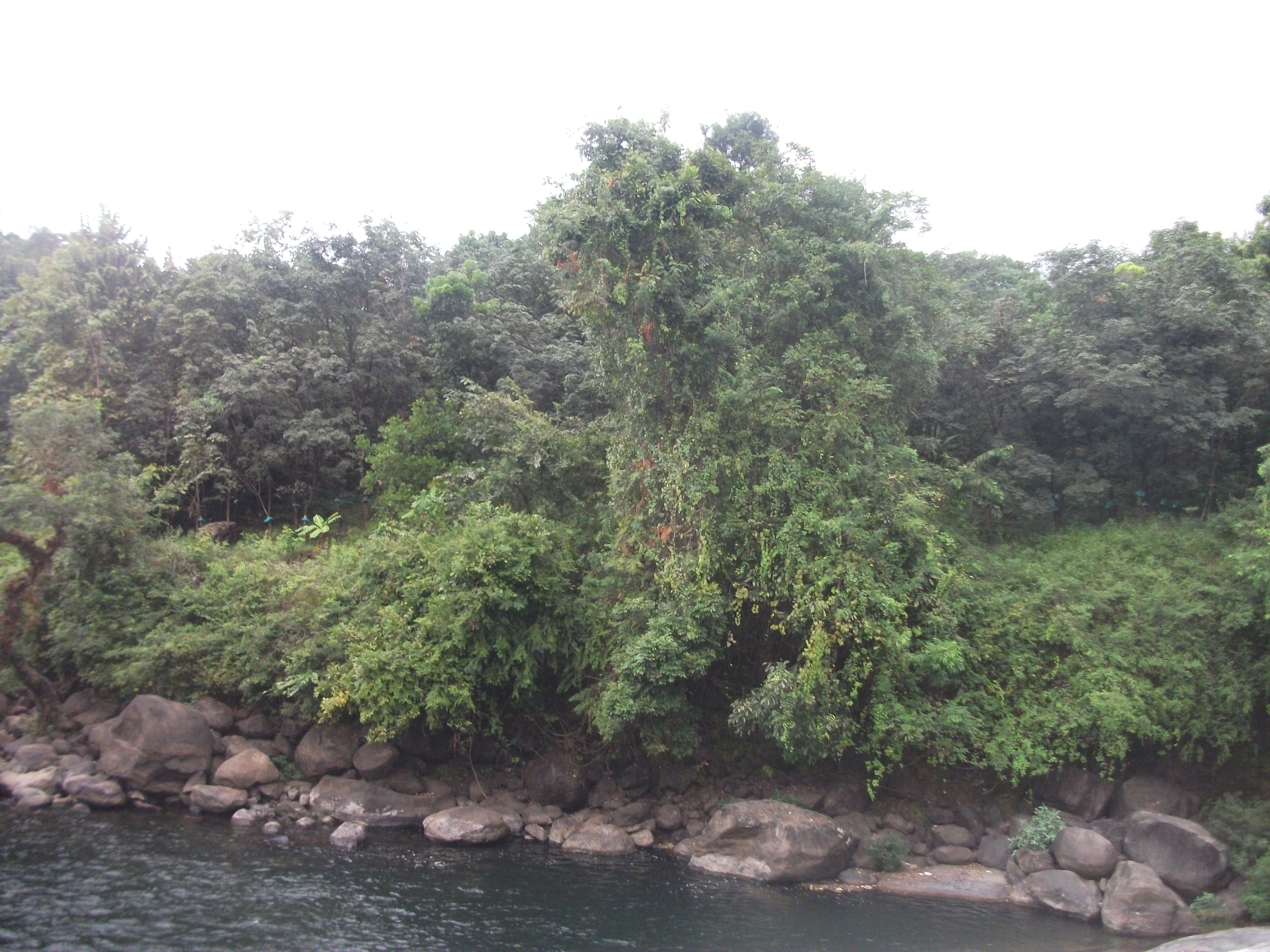
Aripara Falls

== Location ==
It is located in the hill side valley of Vellarimala. Nearby attractions include Kadappanchal bridge and Arippara Waterfalls.

== Transportation ==
The important upcoming developmental project in this area is the construction of the Calicut - Wayanad tunnel road through Anakkampoyil - Kalladi - Meppadi. By constructing this road, the traffic congestion problem in Wayanad pass can be solved. An 8 km road will be constructed through the forest including two small bridges across Iruvanjippuzha and Kaniyad river. Currently, a road is available which passes through Anakkampoyil - Mutahappanpuzha - Marippuzha and from Meppadi to Thollayiram Estate. Once the road is constructed, transportation from Wayanad to southern districts of Kerala will be easier and about 30 km can be reduced. Currently, it is recommended to travel through the Marippuzha - Anakkampoyil - Thiruvambady - Mukkam - Kunnamangalam route.

== Tourist Places ==
1. Vavul Mala

2. Olichuchattam Waterfalls

3. Arippara Water Falls

4. Vellarimala
