= Ennu Ninte Moideen =

2015 film by R. S. Vimal

- Film poster
- Directed by: R. S. Vimal
- Written by: R. S. Vimal
- Produced by: Suresh Raj; Binoy Shankarath; Sureshkumar Muttath; Ragy Thomas
- Starring: Prithviraj Sukumaran; Parvathy Thiruvothu; Tovino Thomas
- Narrated by: Sudheer Karamana
- Cinematography: Jomon T. John
- Edited by: Mahesh Narayanan
- Music by: Songs: M. Jayachandran; Gopi Sundar; Ramesh Narayan; Background Score: Gopi Sundar
- Production company: Newton Movies
- Distributed by: Central Pictures
- Release date: 19 September 2015
- Running time: 166 minutes
- Country: India
- Language: Malayalam
- Budget: ₹12 crore
- Box office: est. ₹56 crore

Ennu Ninte Moideen (transl. Yours Truly, Moideen) is a 2015 Indian Malayalam-language biographical romantic drama film written and directed by R. S. Vimal, based on the real-life story of Kanchanamala and B. P. Moideen, which took place in the 1960s in Mukkam, Kozhikode. Prithviraj Sukumaran and Parvathy Thiruvothu play the title characters of Moideen and Kanchanamala while Tovino Thomas, Bala, Sai Kumar, Sashi Kumar and Lena appear in supporting roles.

Music was composed by M. Jayachandran and Ramesh Narayan, while background score was composed by Gopi Sunder. The cinematography was by Jomon T. John. Upon release, it received a positive critical response and was a commercial success, becoming one of the highest-grossing Malayalam films of all time, grossing over ₹56 crore at the box office. It is widely regarded as one of the best movies of the Malayalam New Wave movement.

== Plot ==
Set in the 1960s and 70's in Mukkam, Kerala, the film tells the tragic love story of Moideen who belongs to a renowned Muslim family and Kanchanamala who is from an affluent thiyya Hindu family. Since inter-religious marriages were considered a taboo then, the couple had to part ways as their families objected to their love affair.

Moideen shifted ground to being a socio-political activist and Kanchanamala lived in her house under strict restrictions for 22 years. Both communicated through letters and a language they had developed. Eventually Kanchanmala was caught and beaten mercilessly by her conservative relatives. Balyambra Pottattu Unni Moideen Sahib, Moideen's father, stabs him since Moideen does not agree to part ways with Kanchanamala but he miraculously escapes. Moideen reveals to the judge and police that it was an accident and his father was not responsible. This confession transforms Balyambra Pottattu Unni Moideen Sahib's attitude towards his son; however, he dies immediately afterwards due to a heart attack. Eventually, Moideen and Kanchana decide to elope but when Moideen was returning after collecting their passports, the boat he was traveling on gets caught in a whirlpool. Although he managed to save his fellow boat-mates, he gets caught in the whirlpool and dies. His body is found 3 days later. Upon hearing about his death, Kanchana decides to commit suicide but is stopped by Moideen's mother. In the end, Kanchana leaves home to live in Moideen's house, as Moideen's unmarried widow.

== Cast ==
- Prithviraj Sukumaran as Balyambra Pottattu Moideen
- Parvathy Thiruvothu as Kottatil Kanchanamala
  - Emine Salman as young Kanchanamala
- Tovino Thomas as Panakkaparambil Appu
- Bala as Kottatil Sethu Madhavan, Kanchana's brother
- Saikumar as Balyambra Pottattu Unni Moideen Sahib
- Sashi Kumar as Kottatil Madhavan
- Lena as Pathumma
- Sudheer Karamana as Mukkam Bhasi
- Shivaji Guruvayoor as Kunjammavan
- Sudheesh as Kottattil Ramachandran
- Kalaranjini as Janaki
- Surabhi Lakshmi as Maaniyamma, servant in Kanchana's house
- Indrans as Nottan Vaidyar
- Disney James as Krishnankutty, Prabhavathi's Husband
- Kozhikode Narayanan Nair as Sathyanath, Appu's father
- Majeed as Ullatil Sahib
- George Tharakan K. J. as Sub-inspector Gafoor
- Balaji Sarma as Mukkam Narayanan
- Vijayan Karanthoor as Soofi haji
- Krishna Namboothiri
- Jayashankar Karimuttam
- Aneesh G. Menon
- Nandan Unni
- Master Roshan as Kochappi
- Sija Rose as Ameena
- Devi Ajith as Moideen's aunt
- Roslin as Appu's mother
- Sneha Raj as Ramadevi
- Charutha Baiju as Leela
- Jaya Noushad as Singer in drama
- Swathi Noushad as Indrani, Kanchana's sister
- Shilpa Raj as Marina
- Vaigha Rose
- Deepika Mohan
- Kozhikode Saradha
- Kozhikode Ramadevi
- Preetha Pradeep
- Tinu Thomas Kannur
- Jija Surendran
- Nila Noushad
- Badri Krishna as Velayudhan

== Production ==
The film is based on the real life love story of Moideen and Kanchanamala, which happened in the 1960s in the backdrops of river Iruvanjippuzha and Mukkam village. Vimal first made the story into a documentary film and then developed it into a full-length feature film. In October 2014, Kanchanamala had accused Vimal of "tweaking their story", stating that several incidents had not been shown correctly in the film.

Prithviraj was chosen to play Moideen upon the insistence of real-life Kanchanamala, as she felt that he had a resemblance to Moideen. Tovino Thomas was signed to play Appuettan (Kanjanamala's cousin), who said that Prithviraj suggested him for the role.

The film was launched at Mascot Hotel in Thiruvananthapuram on 9 July 2014. The shoot was supposed to begin in the first week of August 2014 but was postponed due to rain. Though set entirely in Mukkam, the film was not shot there; it was shot mostly in Shoranur and nearby areas.

== Soundtrack ==
The background music for the film was composed by Gopi Sunder, who also composed a song. Other songs were composed by M. Jayachandran and Ramesh Narayan. Rafeeq Ahamed penned the lyrics. A poem by renowned poet Changampuzha Krishna Pillai was used in the film.

The song "Mukkathe Penne" was composed within five minutes. Gopi Sunder says, "We were doing the background music when director requested us to create a background song for the movie. Mohammed Maqbool Mansoor, a singer who helps me with the Sufi notes, was there during that time. I hummed this tune to him for which he wrote lyrics. He crooned it and thus the song was born." For the song "Kathirunnu", M. Jayachandran won the National Film Award for Best Music Direction for the first time in his career.

== Release ==
The film was released on September 19, 2015, in Kerala and outside Kerala on October 2, 2015. The television satellite rights of Ennu Ninte Moideen was purchased for an amount of ₹ 7 crore by Asianet, which was the highest satellite purchasing amount for any Malayalam film.

=== Film festival screening ===
The film was among the seven films selected to be screened in the Malayalam Cinema Today section of the 20th edition of the International Film Festival of Kerala (IFFK). However, director R. S. Vimal decided to withdraw the film from the festival as it was not included in the Competition Section.

=== Critical response ===
The Hindu wrote "the film presents a classic case of how a compelling real life incident can be adapted for the screen without compromising on the aesthetics of the medium." Baradwaj Rangan wrote, " Even with flatly written characters and plodding narration, the film strikes a chord."

Veeyen of Nowrunning.com rated 3/5 and opined that "a slow-burner that invites its viewers to soak themselves in a compelling romantic tale that is prudently drawn from real life. A pithy, well-acted and remarkably crafted film, this devastating narrative of love, comes across as a true celebration of the tender, expectant spirit that lies deep within it." Hailing the film as "probably the best love story to have graced the screens in the last decade in Malayalam Cinema," Rejath RG of Kerala Kaumudi described it as " a masterful piece of cinema that is sure to leave a long lasting impression in the hearts of moviegoers. R S Vimal has made a gem of a movie, an unforgettable love story of epic proportions."

G. Ragesh of Malayala Manorama rated the film 3.5/5 and described "Apart from being an inquiry into the unknown realms of human emotions such as love, revenge and envy the film has a smooth narrative which offers a glimpse into the socio-political milieu of the time."

Akhila Menon of Filmibeat.com gave a rating of 4/5 and wrote, "It is wonderful to watch the classic form of romance back on the screen, in its complete glory. A well-written script plays the backbone for the film" and "the only minus factor [of the film] is, Kanchanamala gets over-shadowed by Moideen certain points." Sethumadhavan of Bangalore Mirror rated the film 4/5 and said, "Despite the story being so old, the screenplay is powerful enough to hook the audience and make one ignore a few loose ends. Whenever and wherever cinematic liberty has been taken, it does not come across as jarring." Shyamlee Ahmed of The American Bazaar noted that the "powerful story is a far cry from the modern day puppy love stories coming out of Bollywood" and that the film "will be here to stay in our hearts "ennum" (forever), for its effervescent one of a kind eternal love."

=== Box office ===
The film collected approximately ₹81 lakh on the first day of release and ₹1.25 crore in the second day, with Malabar region contributing a major share. It collected ₹6.32 crore in 6 days and ₹10.5 crore when it completed 9 days from Kerala alone. The film collected ₹19 crores from 18 days from Kerala alone. On 14 October 2015, Filmibeat.com reported that the film's gross collection crossed ₹21.8 crore, making it the biggest hit in Prithviraj's career. Within a month of release, the film's collection from Kerala theatres alone was ₹27.2 crore. It grossed about ₹ 32.67 crore and a net ₹ 25.56 crore from Kerala in 42 days; the film's all India gross crossed ₹ 37.50 crore for the same.

The film grossed $107,666 (₹ 71.79 lakh) within eight weeks of its theatrical run in the US and after the 12th weekend at the UK box office, Ennu Ninte Moideen is said to have collected a gross amount of Â£23,698 (₹ 23.40 lakh).

The film collected an estimated ₹ 50 crore from Worldwide box office to become one of the highest grossing Malayalam films of all time, and the film ran over 150 days in theatres.

== Awards and nominations ==
As of 28 March 2016, Ennu Ninte Moideen received 55 wins and 63 nominations.

Award	Category	Recipient(s) and nominee(s)	Result
63rd National Film Awards	Best Music Director	M. Jayachandran	Won
Filmfare Awards South	Best Film	Ennu Ninte Moideen	Nominated
Filmfare Awards South	Best Director	R. S. Vimal	Won
Filmfare Awards South	Best Actor	Prithviraj Sukumaran	Nominated
Filmfare Awards South	Best Actress	Parvathy Thiruvothu	Won
Filmfare Awards South	Best Supporting Actor	Tovino Thomas	Won
Filmfare Awards South	Best Supporting Actress	Lena	Won
Filmfare Awards South	Best Music Director	M. Jayachandran	Won
Filmfare Awards South	Best Lyricist	Rafeeq Ahamed	Won
Filmfare Awards South	Best Playback Singer – Female	Shreya Ghoshal	Won
5th South Indian International Movie Awards	Best Film	Ennu Ninte Moideen	Nominated
5th South Indian International Movie Awards	Best Director	R. S. Vimal	Nominated
5th South Indian International Movie Awards	Best Actor	Prithviraj Sukumaran	Won
5th South Indian International Movie Awards	Best Actress	Parvathy Thiruvothu	Nominated
5th South Indian International Movie Awards	Best Actress (Critics)	Parvathy Thiruvothu	Won
5th South Indian International Movie Awards	Best Supporting Actor	Tovino Thomas	Nominated
5th South Indian International Movie Awards	Best Supporting Actress	Lena	Won
5th South Indian International Movie Awards	Best Actor in a Negative Role	Sai Kumar	Nominated
5th South Indian International Movie Awards	Best Music Director	M. Jayachandran	Nominated
5th South Indian International Movie Awards	Best Lyricist	Rafeeq Ahammed (for song "Kaathirunnu")	Nominated
5th South Indian International Movie Awards	Best Female Playback Singer	Shreya Ghoshal (for song "Kaathirunnu")	Nominated
Asianet Film Awards	Best Film	Ennu Ninte Moideen	Won
Asianet Film Awards	Best Director	R. S. Vimal	Nominated
Asianet Film Awards	Best Actor	Prithviraj Sukumaran	Won
Asianet Film Awards	Best Actress	Parvathy Thiruvothu	Won
Asianet Film Awards	Best Supporting Actor	Sai Kumar	Won
Asianet Film Awards	Best Character Actress	Lena	Won
Asianet Film Awards	Best Script Writer	R. S. Vimal	Won
Asianet Film Awards	Best Cinematography	Jomon T. John	Won
Asianet Film Awards	Best Editor	Mahesh Narayan	Won
Asianet Film Awards	Best Lyricist	Rafeeq Ahmed	Won
Kerala State Film Award			Won
Kerala State Film Award	Most Popular Film	Ennu Ninte Moideen	Won
Kerala State Film Award	Best Actress	Parvathy Thiruvothu	Won
Kerala State Film Award	Best Music Director	Ramesh Narayan	Won
Kerala State Film Award	Best Cinematography	Jomon T. John	Won
Kerala State Film Award	Best Singer (Male)	P. Jayachandran	Won
Kerala State Film Award	Best Lyricist	Rafeeq Ahmed	Won
Kerala State Film Award	Best Sound Design	Renganaath Ravee	Won
1st IIFA Utsavam			Won
1st IIFA Utsavam	Best Film	Ennu Ninte Moideen	Won
1st IIFA Utsavam	Best Director	R. S. Vimal	Nominated
1st IIFA Utsavam	Best Performance in a Leading Role – Male	Prithviraj Sukumaran	Won
1st IIFA Utsavam	Best Performance in a Leading Role – Female	Parvathy Thiruvothu	Won
1st IIFA Utsavam	Best Performance in a Supporting Role – Male	Sai Kumar	Nominated
1st IIFA Utsavam	Best Performance in a Supporting Role – Male	Tovino Thomas	Nominated
1st IIFA Utsavam	Best Performance in a Supporting Role – Female	Lena	Won
1st IIFA Utsavam	Best Performance in a Negative Role – Male	Bala	Nominated
1st IIFA Utsavam	Best Music Direction	Ramesh Narayan; M. Jayachandran; Gopi Sunder	Nominated
1st IIFA Utsavam	Best Lyricist	Muhammed Maqbool Mansoor	Nominated
1st IIFA Utsavam	Best Lyricist	Rafeeq Ahamed	Nominated
1st IIFA Utsavam	Best Playback Singer – Male	Muhammed Maqbool Mansoor	Nominated
1st IIFA Utsavam	Best Playback Singer – Male	Vijay Yesudas	Nominated
1st IIFA Utsavam	Best Playback Singer – Female	Shreya Ghoshal	Won
Asiavision Awards
Asiavision Awards	Best Film	Ennu Ninte Moideen	Won
Asiavision Awards	Best Director	R. S. Vimal	Won
Asiavision Awards	Best Actor	Prithviraj Sukumaran	Won
Asiavision Awards	Best Actress	Parvathy Thiruvothu	Won
Asiavision Awards	Best Supporting Actor	Tovino Thomas	Won
Asiavision Awards	Best Screenplay	R. S. Vimal	Won
Asiavision Awards	Best Cinematography	Jomon T. John	Won
Asiavision Awards	Best Female Singer	Shreya Ghoshal	Nominated
Asiavision Awards	Best Background Score	Gopi Sunder	Won
Asiavision Awards	Most Popular Music Director	Gopi Sunder	Won
Asiavision Awards	New Sensation in Singing	Muhammed Maqbool Mansoor	Won
Vanitha Film Awards
Vanitha Film Awards	Best Movie	Ennu Ninte Moideen	Won
Vanitha Film Awards	Best Director	R. S. Vimal	Won
Vanitha Film Awards	Best Actor	Prithviraj Sukumaran	Won
Vanitha Film Awards	Best Actress	Parvathy Thiruvothu	Won
Vanitha Film Awards	Best Supporting Actress	Lena	Won
Vanitha Film Awards	Best Lyricist	Rafeeq Ahamed	Won
Vanitha Film Awards	Best Cinematographer	Jomon T. John	Won
KFPA Awards
KFPA Awards	Best Film	Ennu Ninte Moideen	Won
KFPA Awards	Best Actor	Prithviraj Sukumaran	Won
KFPA Awards	Best Actress	Parvathy Thiruvothu	Won
KFPA Awards	Best Producer(s)	Suresh Raj; Binoy Shankarath; Ragy Thomas	Won
KFPA Awards	Best Character Actress	Lena	Won
KFPA Awards	Best Debutant Director	R. S. Vimal	Won
KFPA Awards	Best Makeup Artist	Ratheesh Ambady	Won
KFPA Awards	Best Art Director	Gokul Das	Won
Ramu Kariat Awards
Ramu Kariat Awards	Best Promising Star	Tovino Thomas	Won
IBNLive Awards
IBNLive Awards	Best Actor (South)	Prithviraj Sukumaran	Nominated
IBNLive Awards	Best Actress (South)	Parvathy Thiruvothu	Nominated
