= Zamorin's Guruvayurappan College =

College in Kozhikode, Kerala, India

- Established: 1877; 149 years ago
- Founder: HH Shri. Manavikraman Maharaja Bahadur
- Affiliations: University of Calicut
- Location: Pokkunnu, Kozhikode, Kerala; 11.2411°N 75.822°E
- Website: zgcollege.ac.in/
- Location within Kerala Location within India

The Zamorin's Guruvayurappan College is an aided college in Kozhikode, Kerala, India offering graduation and post-graduation courses. It is affiliated to the University of Calicut.

== History ==
The original institution was founded by the Zamorin of Eranad, HH Shri. Manavikraman Maharaja Bahadur, as an English school in June 1877, to impart English education to the young members of the Zamorin's family. In 1878, it came to be known as "Kerala Vidyasala" and was thrown open to Hindu boys of all castes.

In 1879, the institution was affiliated to the University of Madras as a second grade college. In 1900, the institution was renamed "The Zamorin's College". In 1904, the Zamorin constituted a Board of Management for the administration of the college. The present site of the college at Pokkunnu was purchased with the help of a grant from the Guruvayur Devaswom.

In recognition of this gift, the institution was renamed "The Guruvayurappan College". In 1955, the college moved to its present site, at Pokkunnu. In 1958, the college was affiliated to the University of Travancore, which later came to be known as the University of Kerala. Later in 1968, when the University of Calicut was formed, the college was affiliated to it.

The college acquired its present name "The Zamorin's Guruvayurappan College" in 1981.

In July 2017, there was a crackdown across the campus on criminal gang activity on the campus. Students complained that they were being extorted for money which prompted a police investigation of multiple alleged incidents and students said to be involved. Gang names alleged in the probe included - Brahmas, Aryas, Budhas, Kshatriyas, and Yadhavas.

== Courses offered ==
The college offers 3 year undergraduate degree programs in 12 different specializations as well as 2 year post graduate programs in 9 specializations. PhD is offered in Botany, Economics, Malayalam, Chemistry and English. The college also has a computer center which offers vocational training to students and conducts Diploma course in computer applications.

== Facilities ==
Zamorins Guruvayurappan college is one of the oldest institution in the country celebrating its 144th anniversary in 2021. The college campus is located on top of the hill called Pokkunnu, also called Krishna Giri hills, 8 km away from the city of Calicut. The campus of the college spans over an area of 92 acres.

== Alumni ==
- John Matthai, former Finance Minister, Government of India
- Justice V. Balakrishna Eradi, Former Judge, Supreme Court of India
- K. Damodaran, Founder Member of Communist Party of India in Kerala
- V. K. Krishna Menon, nationalist, politician and diplomat; Former Union minister for Defense
- S. K. Pottekkatt, Malayalam author
- M. P. M. Menon, Diplomat
- K. P. Kesava Menon, nationalist and politician; Founder of the Malayalam newspaper, Mathrubhumi
- A. Pradeepkumar, communist politician; former MLA Kozhikode North constituency
- N. P. Mohammed, Novelist
- K. K. Rema, MLA
- Joy Mathew, film director and activist
- Anil Radhakrishnan Menon, film director
- Vinod Kovoor, cine artist
- P. Vijayan IPS
- U. K. Kumaran, Writer
- Ranjith Padinhateeri, Biological Physicist
- M N Karassery, Writer
- Sathyan Mokeri, Former Member of Kerala Legislative Assembly

== See also ==
- Education in India
- Education in Kerala
- List of institutions of higher education in Kerala
- List of colleges affiliated to the University of Calicut
