= B. P. Moideen =

Indian politician (1937–1982)

Balyambra Pottattu Moideen
- Portrait of B. P. Moideen
- Born: 25 November 1937; Mukkam, Madras Presidency, British Raj (present-day Kerala, India)
- Died: 15 July 1982 (aged 44); Mukkam, Kerala, India
- Occupations: Politician, film producer
- Notable work: Abhinayam, Sports Herald
- Political party: Praja Socialist Party
- Awards: Jeevan Raksha Padak, Class I, 1983

Balyambra Pottattu Moideen (25 November 1937 – 15 July 1982) was an Indian politician, film producer, and publisher from Kerala. He was Praja Socialist Party's youth wing president in Madras Presidency, British Raj in 1940s and later Kerala, India, and was elected member of Mukkam Panchayat in 1979. Moideen published Sports Herald, a Malayalam sports magazine.

His debut production was a Malayalam film Nizhale Nee Sakshi in 1977, which also debuted Seema as a lead actress, and focused on the 1976 death of college student P. Rajan following torture in police custody. However, the film was never released. Moideen later produced the films Abhinayam (1981) starring Jayan, and India Nee Sundari.

He was awarded the national civilian gallantry honour Jeevan Raksha Padak, Class I posthumously by the President of India in 1983, for saving lives in a ferry boat accident in Iruvanji River in Kozhikode in 1982, in which he drowned himself.

== In popular culture ==
B. P. Moideen's romance with Kanchanamala was the subject of the 2015 Malayalam biographical film Ennu Ninte Moideen, in which Prithviraj Sukumaran portrayed Moideen.

== Memorial ==
B. P. Moideen Sevamandir, the charity foundation named after Moideen, is led by Moideen's widow Kanchanamala.
