= M. N. Karassery =

Indian writer and critic of Malayalam language

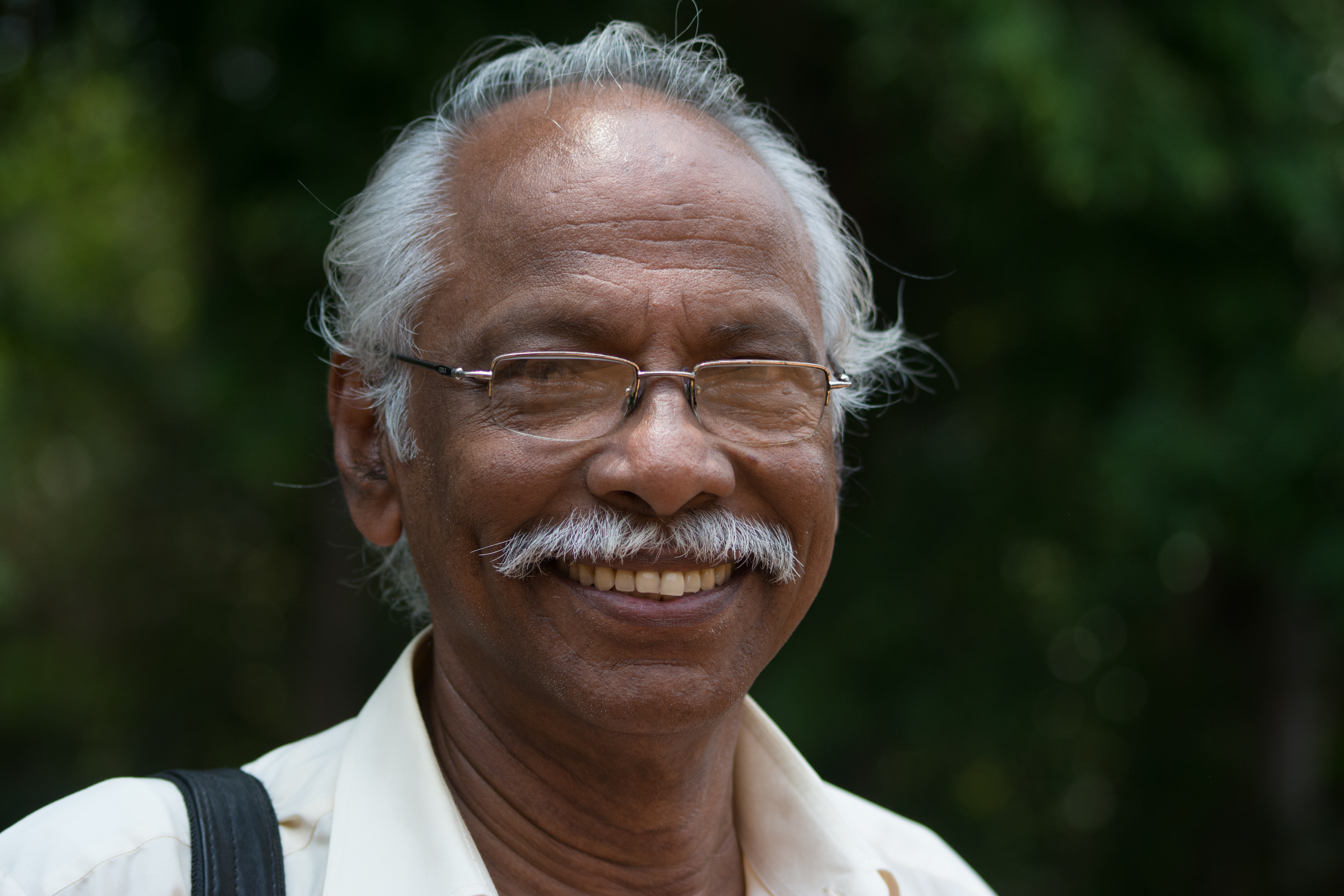
- Indian writer and critic of Malayalam language
- Born: Mohiyuddin Nedukkandiyil; 2 July 1951 (age 75); Karassery, Malabar District, Madras State (present day Kozhikode, Kerala), India
- Education: Zamorin's Guruvayurappan College, Kozhikode; University of Calicut
- Occupations: Academic; Writer; Critic

Mohiyuddin Nadukkandiyil Karassery (born 2 July 1951), commonly known as M. N. Karassery, is an Indian writer and critic of Malayalam language. He is known for his writing and lectures on politics, literature, art and culture, and is a recipient of K.M. Seethi Sahib Memorial Human Fraternity Award and holds the distinguished chair in Malayalam studies at University of Calicut.

== Early life ==
Karassery is also the name of the village in which he was born. It is a panchayath situated in the eastern region of Kozhikode district in Kerala. Karassery was born on 2 July 1951 to N. C. Mohammad Haji and K. C. Ayishakkutty.

== Education ==
For his early education, Karassery attended the Karassery U.P. School, Hidayathussibiyan Madrasa and Dars of Karassery Juma Masjid. He then enrolled in the Chennamangallur High School and Zamorin's Guruvayurappan College, Kozhikode. After graduation in 1972, he joined the Department of Malayalam, at the University of Calicut. Here he earned a B.A. in Sociology and Malayalam in 1974. Ten years later, he returned for a M.Phil. in Malayalam. And in 1993, he earned a Ph.D. in Malayalam from the same department under the guidance of Prof. Sukumar Azhicode.

== Activism and public life ==
Karassery's activism targets caste prejudice, social justice and religious equality in India. In May 2017, for example, he suggested the creation of a separate department in India for happiness. His writings and lectures support secular democracy and gender justice. In September 2018, he led a sit-in protest that demanded the arrest of bishop Franco Mulakkal for allegedly raping a nun.

== Bibliography ==
Karassery's works include:

Year	Title	Publisher	Notes
1981	Vishakalanam	National Book Stall, Kottayam	
1981	Thirumozhikal	Prathibha Books, Calicut	Selected sayings of Muhammad
1982	Mulla Nasaruddeente Podikkaikal	Akshara Books, Calicut	Humour stories of Mullah Nasruddin
1987	Kurimanam	Malayalam Publication, Calicut	
1987	Husnul Jamal	Al Huda Book Stall, Calicut	Retelling of Moyinkutty Vaidyar's epic poem
1989	Thiruvarul	Al Huda Book Stall, Calicut	Selected verses from Koran
1995	Alochana	Current Books, Trichur	
1996	Onninte Darshanam	Poorna Publications, Calicut	
1997	Kazchavattam	PK Brothers, Calicut	
1998	Mararude Kurukshethram	Vallathol Vidyapeetham, Sukapuram	A study on Kuttikrishna Marar's Bharathaparyaadanam
1999	Kulichallennu Paranjalentha?	Lipi Publications, Calicut	
2000	Mulla Nasarudheente Nerampokkukal	Lipi Publications, Calicut	Humour stories of Mullah Nasruddin
2000	Basheer Mala	Lipi Publications, Calicut	Songs on Vaikom Muhammad Basheer
2001	Aarum Koluthatha Vilakku	National Book Stall, Kottayam	
2001	Chekanoorinte Raktham	Pappiyon Publications, Calicut	Essays on the murder of Chekannur Maulavi
2001	Thunchan Parambile Bleach	Olive Publications, Calicut	Humour
2002	Muslim Nadukalile Pazhanchollukal	Pappiyon Publications, Calicut	Proverbs from the Muslim world
2003	Basheerinte Poonkavanam	DC Books, Kottayam	Essays on Vaikom Muhammad Basheer
2004	Vargeeyathaykkethire oru Pusthakam	Mathrubhumi Books, Calicut	Essays on secularism
2005	Nireekshanathinte Rekhakal	Poorna Publications, Calicut	
2005	Thelimalayalam	DC Books, Kottayam	Essays on socio-linguistics
2006	Pathantharam	Current Books, Trichur	
2006	Nammude Mumpile Kannadikal	Lipi Publications, Calicut	
2007	Oru Vakkinte Paatham	Kairali Book Trust, Kannur	
2007	Vivekam Pakam Cheyyunnathu Ethu Aduppilanu?	Mathrubhumi Books, Calicut	Essays on secularism
2008	Vaikom Muhammad Basheer	Sahitya Akademi, New Delhi	Biography of Vaikom Muhammad Basheer
2008	Kunjunni- Lokavum Kolavum	Vallathol Vidyapeetham, Sukapuram	Biography of Kunjunni Mash
2008	Ummamarkkuvendi Oru Sankada Haraji	DC Books, Kottayam	Essays on the problems faced by Kerala's Muslim women
2008	Naykkalkku Praveshanamilla	Chintha Publishers, Trivandrum	
2009	Jathiyekkal Kattiyulla Raktham	National Book Stall, Kottayam	Essays on caste politics
2009	Aranu Christianikale Apamanikkunnath?	Grand Books, Kottayam	
2010	Islamika Rashtreeyam Vimarshikkappedunnu	Mathrubhumi Books, Calicut	Critique of Islamist politics
2010	Snehamillathavarkku Mathavishwasamilla	Sithara Books, Kayamkulam	
2010	Mulla Nasarudheente Kusrithikal	DC Books, Kottayam	Humour stories of Mullah Nasruddin
2011	Snehichum Tharkkichum	H&C Books, Trichur	
2011	Kuruthakkedil Kuricha Thudakkam	Poorna Publications, Calicut	
2011	Mulla Nasarudheen Kathakal	Mathrubhumi Books, Calicut	Humour stories of Mullah Nasruddin
2012	Vishappinte Athmeeyatha	Lipi Publications, Calicut	
2012	Mathetharavadathe Musleengal Pedikkendathundo?	DC Books, Kottayam	Essays on secularism
2012	Thaymozhi	DC Books, Kottayam	Essays on socio-linguistics
2012	Malayala Vakku	DC Books, Kottayam	Essays on socio-linguistics
2012	Azhicode Mash	DC Books, Kottayam	Essays on Sukumar Azhikode
2012	Anubhavam Ormma Yathra	Olive Publications, Calicut	Travel notes and memoirs
2013	Neethi Thedunna Vakku	DC Books, Kottayam	Selected essays, Ed. K. C. Narayanan
2014	Vakkinte Varavu	Kerala Bhasha Institute, Trivandrum	Essays on socio-linguistics
2014	Pidakkozhi Koovaruth!	Mathrubhumi Books, Calicut	Essays on the problems faced by Muslim women in Kerala
2015	Moyinkutty Vaidyar: Kalayum Kaalavum	Vallathol Vidyapeetham, Sukapuram	Biography of Moyinkutty Vaidyar
2017	Valarunna Keralam, Marunna Malayalam	DC Books, Kottayam	Evolution of the Malayalam language from 1956 to 2016
2017	Thiranjedutha Sahitya Lekhanangal	Kerala Sahitya Akademi, Trichur	Selected essays, Ed. P. K.Dayanandan
2020	Mathathinte Rashtreeyavum Rashtreeyathinte Mathavum	Hornbill Publications, Trichur	
2020	Karasseriyile Kissakal	Mathrubhumi Books, Calicut	About Karassery village
2020	Pulikkottil: Mappilappattile Keraleeyatha	Vallathol Vidyapeetham, Sukapuram	A study on the works of Pulikkottil Hyder
2021	Basheer: Nanmayude Velicham	Finger Books, Perambra	A study on the works of Vaikom Muhammad Basheer
2022	Enthina Malayalam Padikkunnath?	Mathrubhumi Books, Calicut	
2022	Umma	Mathrubhumi Books, Calicut	Memoirs about Karassery's mother

=== Edited works ===
Year	Title	Publisher	Notes
1979	Pulikkottil Kritikal	Mappila Kala Sahitya Vedi, Wandoor	Selected works of Pulikkottil Hyder
1991	Navathalam	PK Brothers, Calicut	Selected of modern poerms in Malayalam
1997	Tharathamya Sahitya Vicharam	University of Calicut, Calicut	Studies on comparative literature
1998	Tharathamya Sahitya Chintha	University of Calicut, Calicut	Studies on comparative literature
1999	Tharathamya Sahitya Vivekam	University of Calicut, Calicut	Studies on comparative literature
1999	Rajatharekha	Current Books, Trichur	On the Malayalam department of Calicut University (1971–96)
2000	Sahitya Sidhantha Charcha	University of Calicut, Calicut	Studies on literary theories
2005	CN Smaranika	Lipi Publications, Calicut	Essays on C. N. Ahmad Moulavi

=== Interviews ===
Year	Title	Publisher	Notes
2003	Samsaram	Mulberry Publications, Calicut	Interviews with Vaikom Muhammad Basheer, M. T. Vasudevan Nair, N. P. Mohammed and Sukumar Azhikode
2005	Malabar Kalapam, Nalam Lokam, Keraleeyatha	Current Books, Trichur	Interview with M. Gangadharan on Malabar rebellion and other topics
2006	Shariath : Chila Varthamanangal	Pappiyon Publications, Calicut	Interviews on Sharia with Vaikom Muhammad Basheer, Asghar Ali Engineer, Kamala Surayya, Thoppil Mohamed Meeran, Sara Aboobacker, N. P. Mohammed and Tahir Mahmood
2019	Varthamankala Varthamanangal	DC Books, Kottayam	Interview with Anand
2020	Gandhiyude Sakshi	DC Books, Kottayam	Interview with V. Kalyanam, M. K. Gandhi's personal secretary

=== Translations ===
Year	Title	Publisher	Notes
1983	Makkayilekkulla Patha	Islamic Publishing House, Calicut	Translation of The Road to Mecca by Muhammad Asad
1999	Pottekkattu	Sahitya Akademi, New Delhi	Translation of Pottekkattu, an English biography of S. K. Pottekkattu by R. Viswanathan
2002	Pranayaharsham	Pappiyon Publications, Calicut	Translation of selected love poems of Rumi
2003	Pranayadaham	Pappiyon Publications, Calicut	Translation of selected love poems of Kahlil Gibran
2013	Mazha Kanakkunnu	University of Calicut	Translation of Rain Rising by Nirupama Rao
2018	Vazhthupattillathe	DC Books, Kottayam	Translation of selected essays by Anita Pratap

== Awards ==
- N. Mohanan Award
- Sambasivan Award
