= Mukkam =

Mukkam Mukkom
- Municipality
- Location in Kerala, India
- Coordinates: 11°19′28″N 75°59′34″E
- Country: India
- State: Kerala
- District: Kozhikode
- Native language: Malayalam

Government
  - Type: Municipal council
  - Body: Mukkam Municipality
  - MLA: Linto Joseph (Thiruvambady Assembly)
  - Member of Parliament: Priyanka Gandhi (Wayanad Assembly)

Area
  - Total: 31.28 km^{2} (12.08 sq mi)

Population (2011)
  - Total: 40,670
  - Density: 1,300/km^{2} (3,367/sq mi)

Languages
  - Official: Malayalam, English
- Time zone: UTC+5:30 (IST)
- PIN: 673602
- Telephone code: 91-495
- Vehicle registration: KL-57
- Nearest city: Kozhikode (27 kilometres (17 mi))
- Lok Sabha constituency: Wayanad
- Taluk: Kozhikode
- Website: mukkammunicipality.lsgkerala.gov.in

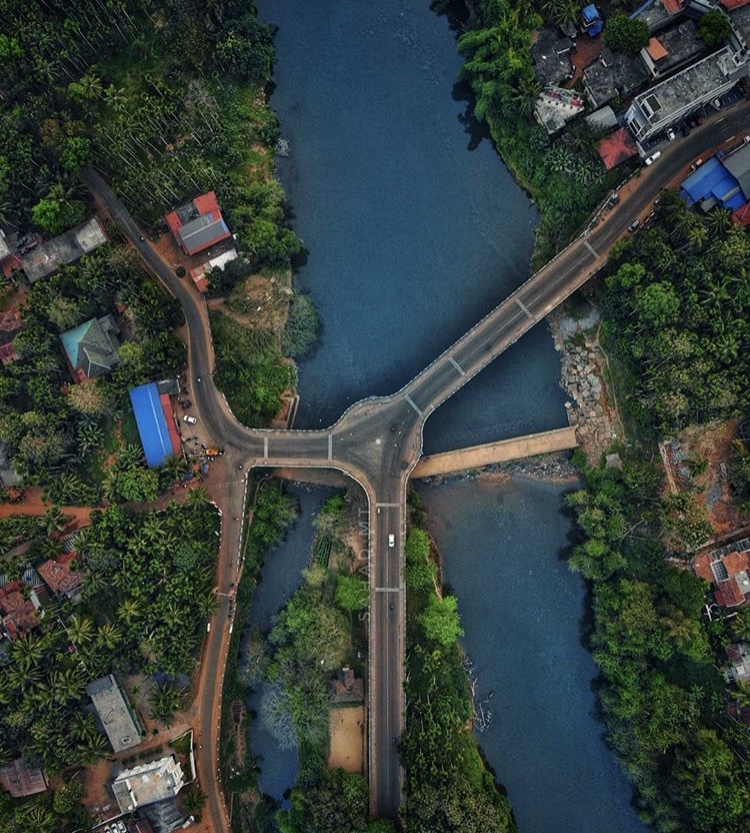

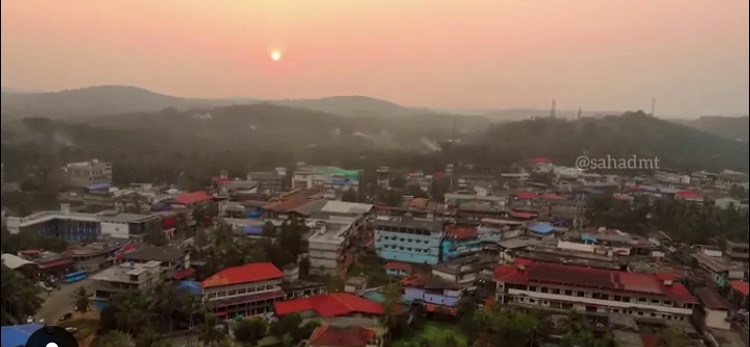

Mukkam is a municipal town in the Kozhikode district, in the state of Kerala, India. It is located about 27 km east of Kozhikode city on the banks of the Iruvanjippuzha River, one of the major tributaries of the Chaliyar River. Mukkam is under Kozhikode Taluk, Thiruvambady Assembly Constituency and Wayanad Parliament Constituency.

== Demographics ==
Mukkam municipality has a population of 40,670 (2011 census) with a growth rate of 9.41% during 2001-2011. The population density of was 1300.17/km^{2}. The male population was 19,654 and female population was 21,016.

It is a municipality with an area of 31.28 km2 within the Taluk of Kozhikode. It is about 26 km from the Calicut International Airport and 30 km from the Calicut Railway station. Mukkam municipality is at 11.3184o N and 75.9586oE.

Year	Population	Growth %
1991	30338	
2001	37172	22.52
2011	40670	9.41

== Civic administration ==
=== Mukkam Municipality election 2020 ===
S.No.	Party name	Party symbol	Number of councillors
01	LDF		12
02	UDF		11
03	Independents		06
04	WPI		03
05	BJP		01

== In popular culture ==
S. K. Pottekkatt depicts Mukkam in his 1941 novel Naadan Premam and there is a memorial with his name in the town.

Ennu Ninte Moideen is a 2015 romantic thriller film written and directed by R. S. Vimal, based on events which happened in the 1960s in Mukkam.

== Transport ==
=== Road ===
State Highway 34 (SH 34) passes through Mukkam.

=== Air ===
The nearest airport is Calicut International Airport, 26 km southwest of Mukkam, the 12th busiest airport in India in passenger traffic.

== Notable people ==
- O. Abdurahman, journalist
- Mathai Chacko, ex MLA
- Linto Joseph, MLA
- Prof. M. N. Karassery, writer
- B. P. Moideen, politician
- Noufal PN, footballer
- George M. Thomas, ex MLA
- Kanchanamala, Activist

== See also ==
- Kunnamangalam
- Thamarassery
- Omassery
- Thiruvambady
- Mavoor
- Koduvally
- Areekode
