= Iruvanjippuzha =

Iruvanjippuazha
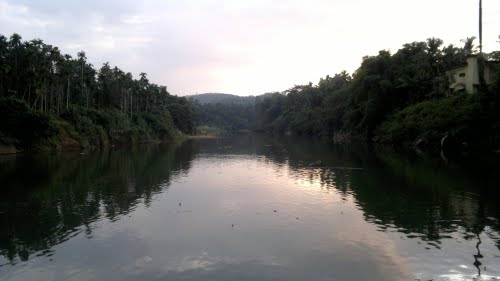
- Etymology: Iruvanjipuzha

Location
- Country: India
- State: Kerala
- Region: Asia
- City: Anakkampoyil Thiruvambady Mukkam Kumaraneloor Kodiyathur Chennamangallur Cheruvadi

Physical characteristics
- Source: Vellarimala
  - location: Western Ghats, Kerala, India
  - coordinates: 11°16′4.50″N 75°58′42.61″E
  - elevation: 1,544 meters
- Mouth
  - location: Chaliyar River, India
  - elevation: 0 m (0 ft)
- Length: 50 km (31 mi)approx.
- Discharge
  - location: mouth

Basin features
- Tributaries
  - left: Chalippuzha
  - right: Cherupuzha

Iruvazhanjippuzha, or Iruvanjipuzha, is a major tributary of River Chaliyar flowing in Kerala. It joins into Chaliyar at Koolimadu near Cheruvadi. Its major tributary is Chalippuzha, which joins with it about 3 km north of Thiruvambady town. Other tributaries are Muthappanpuzha (joining at Anakkampoyil), ulingappuzha (joining at Thiruvambadi) and Karamoola river (join at Mukkam). The famous Thusharagiri waterfall is in the Chalippuzha river. Every year, the Malabar River Festival happens in this river, which is recognized as the biggest Kayak event in Asia.

The villages of Anakkampoyil, Kandappanchal, Narangathode,Thiruvambady, Mukkam, Kodiyathur, Chennamangallur and Cheruvadi are on the banks of this river.

Naadan Premam (transl: Love in the Countryside), a major romantic novel by Malayalam writer S. K. Pottekkatt, is set in the backdrops of Iruvanjippuzha. The river is also mentioned in the film Ennu Ninte Moideen. In this film it shows how the real character dies B. P. Moideen after drowning in the Iruvanjippuzha River.

== Landslides in 2024 ==
In August 2024, an ISRO satellite image revealed that about 86,000 sq metres of land slipped away and the debris travelled 8 km along Iruvanjippuzha river during the 2024 landslides.
