= Vellarimala =

Mountain range in Kerala, India

Coordinates: 11°27′N 76°09′E

Vellarimala Hills is a mountain range in Kerala, India, spread across Thiruvambady Panchayat in Kozhikode district and Meppadi Panchayat in Wayanad district.

== Description ==
Vellarimala forms a part of a high hill range of what is otherwise known as the Camel's Hump Mountains, a part of the Western Ghats. Most of the hill range falls in the Meppadi Forest Range of the South Wayanad Division, with some parts falling in the Thamarassery Range of the Kozhikode Division. They are semi-contiguous with Nilgiris or Nilgiri Hills in Tamil Nadu, separated by the Chaliyar Valley. The plateau of Wayanad lies on the eastern slopes of these hills and merges gradually with the Mysore plateau. The hill ranges are accessible by foot from Muthappanpuzha, near Anakkampoyil, a small town about 50 km from Kozhikode. About 6 km by foot from Muthappanpuzha on the way to Vellarimala hills is the waterfall called Olichuchattam. It is situated 15 km from Thiruvambady. KSRTC bus services are available from Thiruvambady to Anakkampoyil and Muthappanpuzha. Swargam Kunnu is also situated here. Vellarimala - Swargam Kunnu - Masthakappara - Olichuchattam - Marippuzha-Muthappanpuzha Trekking is available with forest permission. Now road is available from Thiruvambady to Marippuzha.

This block of compact high mountains between 1200m-2000m which is floristically and faunistically similar to the Nilgiri Hills.

The tallest peak in this range is called Vavul Mala. At an elevation of 2,339 m (7,674 ft), it is the tallest of the Western Ghats to the north of Nilgiri Hills and lies on the border between Kozhikode and Malappuram districts. In the same complex of peaks, less than 3 km away is the second highest peak of the range, Vellarimala peak. It lies on the trijunction of Wayanad, Kozhikode and Malappuram districts at an elevation of 2,240 m (7,349 ft) and is the highest peak in Wayanad.
