= Thiruvambady =

- Town
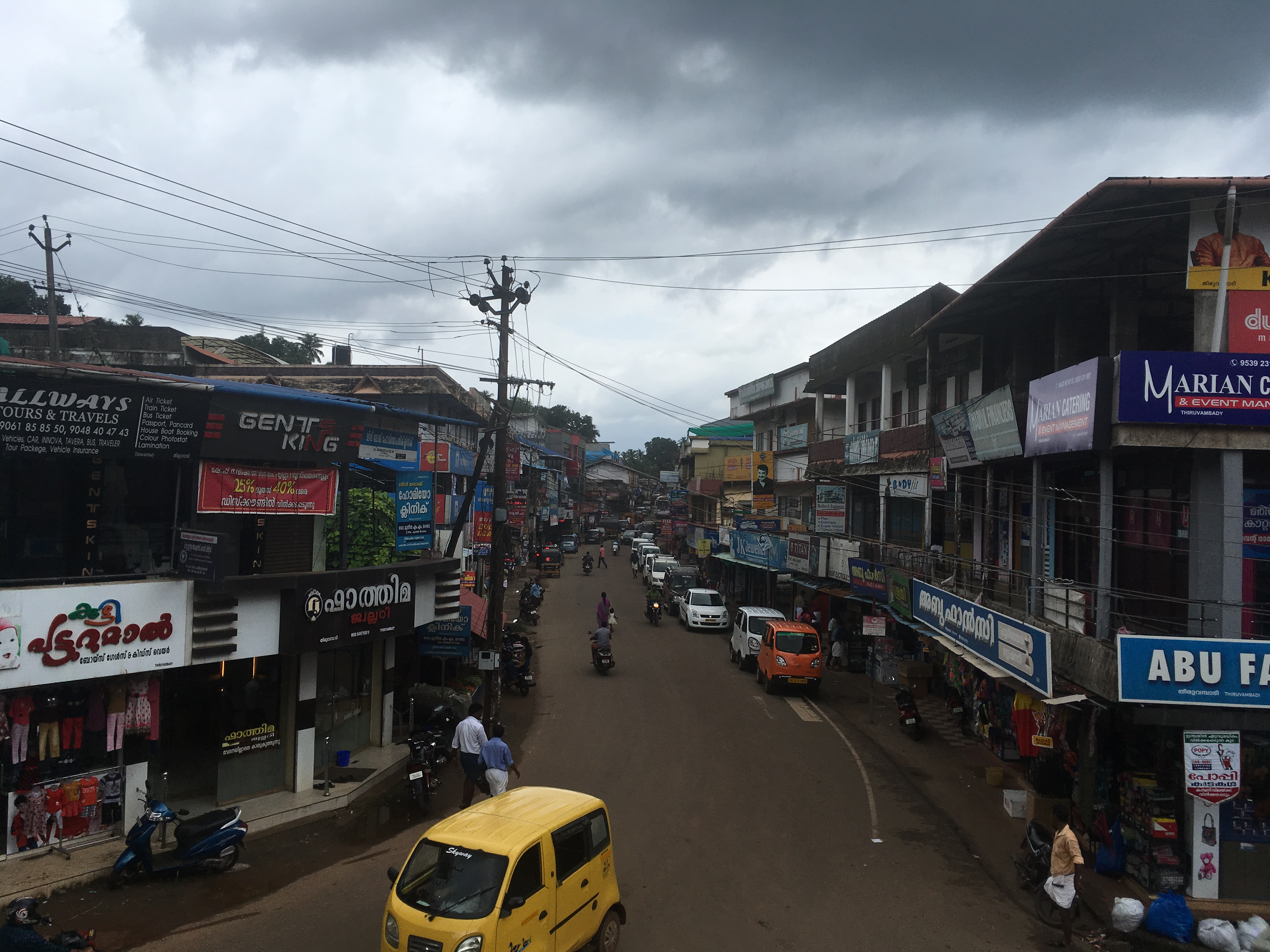

- Location in Kozhikode, Kerala, India
- Coordinates: 11°21′39″N 76°00′32″E
- Country: India
- State: Kerala
- District: Kozhikode

Government
  - Type: Local Self Government
  - Body: Thiruvambady Grama Panchayat
  - Panchayat President: Jithin Pallattu
  - MLA: CK Kasim (Thiruvambady Constituency)
  - MP: Priyanka Gandhi (Wayanad Constituency)

Population (2011)
  - Total: 28,820

Languages
  - Official: Malayalam, English
- Time zone: UTC+5:30 (IST)
- PIN: 673603
- Telephone code: 0495 225....
- Vehicle registration: KL 57
- Sex ratio: 1000:1040 ♂/♀
- Literacy: 98%

Thiruvambady is a town in Kozhikode district in Kerala, India which lies near foothills of Wayanad. Thiruvambady Assembly constituency is a Legislative Assembly Constituency of Kerala, situated 35 kilometres (22 mi) from west of Kozhikode.

== Geography ==
Thiruvambady is 35 kilometres (22 mi) towards east from Calicut city and is on the banks of the Iruvanjippuzha River. Thiruvambady is on the footage of Western Ghats and Wyanad forest which is close to major waterfalls, such as Thusharagiri Falls, Aripara Falls and Kozhippara Waterfalls Kakkadampoyil.

== History ==
Thiruvambady was established in 1805 during British rule. The town was a forest area that belonged to the East India Company. During that time Thiruvambady was given to Kottayam King Kalppakassery Karnoru and the forest around it was given to Manniledathu Nair Tharavadu. The former name of Thiruvambady was Nayarukolli. Nair and Exhava people made up the majority of the population around the 1900s. Later in 1944, Christians migrated from Pala and Kottayam and settled permanently to engage in agriculture. They built schools, hospitals and churches and the town relocated to its current place. Muslims also migrated to Thiruvambady and engaged in business.

== Economy ==
Earlier Thiruvambady was an agricultural town, now due to urban sprawl, the majority of people are engaged in job and business.

== Administration ==
Thiruvambady Gramapanchayath was established on 1 January 1962 and consists of 17 wards covering an area of 83.96 square kilometres (32.42 sq mi), which includes 9,000 acres (3,600 ha) of forest. Thiruvambady is under Koduvally Block Panchayat and Thamarassery Taluk.

Thiruvambady is part of the Wayanad parliamentary constituency. The current MP is Priyanka Gandhi.

In 1977, the Thiruvambady assembly constituency of the Kerala Legislative Assembly was established, consisting of 7 Panchayats. The current MLA is C K Kasim

== Transportation ==
=== Road ===
Thiruvambady is well connected by road to nearby places. State Highway 83 passes through Thiruvambady town. It can be reached by the following routes:

- Thiruvananthapuram - Kochi - Guruvayoor/Thrissur - Pattambi - Perinthalmanna - Manjeri - Areekode - Mukkam - Thiruvambady
- Kozhikode - Kunnamangalam - REC (NIT) - Mukkam (Agastiamuzhi) - Thiruvambady
- Kannur - Koyilandy - Thamarassery - Omassery - Thiruvambady
- Wayanad - Kalpetta - Adivaram - Kaithapoyil - Kodenchery - Thiruvambady
- Nilambur - Akambadam - Kakkadampoyil - Koombara - Koodaranhi - Thiruvambady
- Koduvally - Omassery - Thiruvambady - Pulloorampara - Anakkampoyil

=== Buses ===
A KSRTC bus operating centre is in town, as well as a private bus stand. There are buses to nearby places such as Kozhikode, Mukkam, Omassery, Thamarassery, Koduvally, Pulloorampara, Anakkampoyil, Poovaranthode, Koodaranji, and Kodenchery; and KSRTC operates many inter-district routes.

=== Rail ===
The nearest railway station is Kozhikode Railway Station, 35 kilometres (22 mi) distant.

=== Air ===
The nearest airport is Calicut International Airport, 43 kilometres (27 mi) distant.

There was a proposal to build Thiruvambady International Airport for Calicut City; the plan was later cancelled. Restrictions on larger aircraft landing at the existing airport for safety considerations has been reported as one rationale for building a new airport.

== Distance chart ==
The Kilometer chart from Thiruvambady is given below:

| Kozhikode - 35 km | Thamarassery - 15 km |
| Manjeri - 36 km | Mukkam - 6 km |
| Kunnamangalam - 20 km | Koduvally - 12 km |
| Perinthalmanna - 60 km | Areekode - 20 km |
| Palakkad - 122 km | Omassery - 5 km |
| Thrissur - 133 km | Anakkampoyil - 13 km |
| Ernakulam - 202 km | Koodaranji - 5 km |
| Thiruvananthapuram - 414 km | Kodencheri - 10 km |
| Kannur - 113 km | Pulloorampara - 8 km |
| Kalpetta - 53 km | Kakkadampoyil - 19 km |
| Nilambur - 50 km | Punnackal - 5 km |
| Koyilandy - 43 km | Thusharagiri Falls - 18 km |

== Notable people from Thiruvambady ==
- Mathai Chacko – Late former MLA and communist leader
- Jacob Thoomkuzhy – Former metropolitan archbishop
- Noufal PN footballer

== Gallery ==
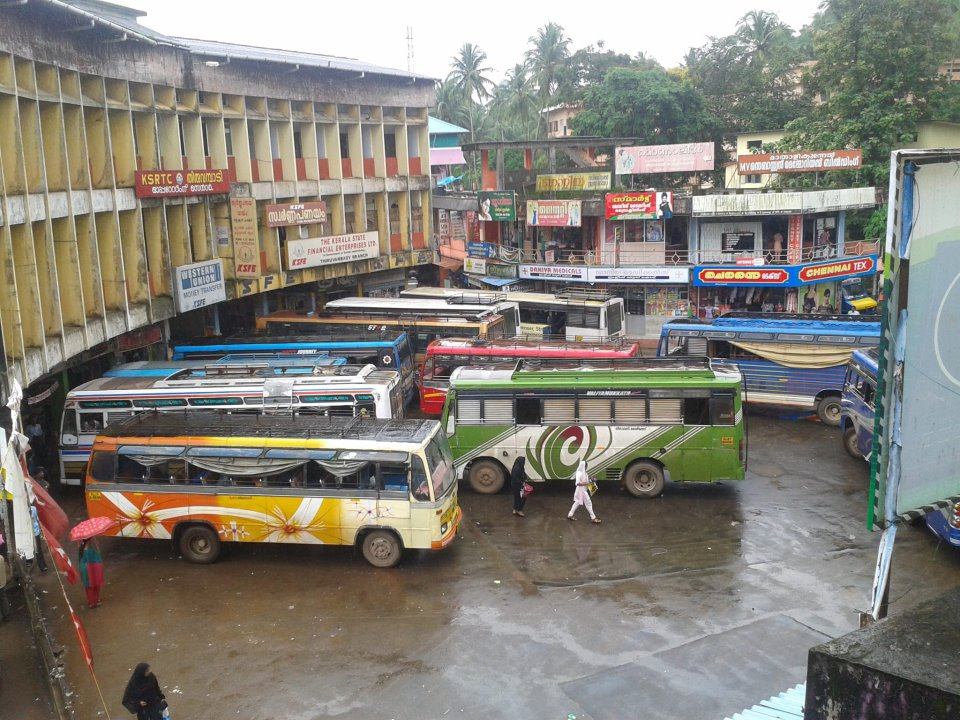
Bus Stand

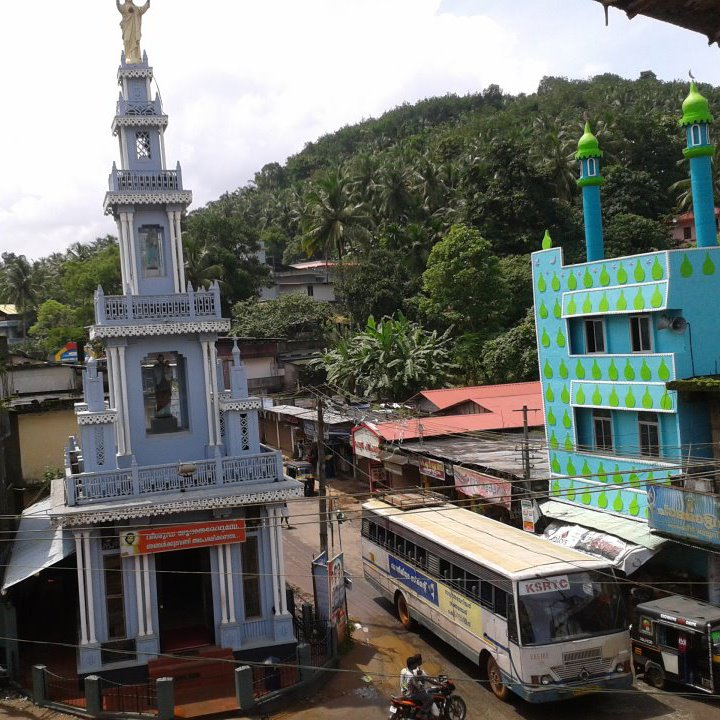
Town
