= Chakkalakkal =

Village in Kozhikode district, Kerala, India

- Town
- Country: India
- State: Kerala
- District: Kozhikode district
- Time zone: UTC+5:30 (IST)
- PIN: 673571
- Nearest city: Kozhikode
- Lok Sabha constituency: Kozhikode
- Vidhan Sabha constituency: Koduvally

Chakkalakkal is a place in Kozhikode district in Kerala, India, located about 20 km east of Kozhikode city on the Kunnamangalam-Nanminda road or Kappad-Thusharagiri-Adivaram road. Nearby places are Koduvally, Narikkuni, and Arambram. The only government-aided higher secondary school in Madavoor village is situated in Chakkalakkal. Chakalakal is a populous place with a population of over 1000. This place has come into news due to the protest against destruction of knolls for the Chakkalakkal higher secondary school.

== Transportation ==
Chakkalakkal village connects to other parts of India through Calicut city on the west and Thamarassery town on the east. National highway No.66 passes through Kozhikode and the northern stretch connects to Mangalore, Goa and Mumbai. The southern stretch connects to Cochin and Trivandrum. The eastern National Highway No.54 going through Adivaram connects to Kalpetta, Mysore and Bangalore. The nearest airports are at Kannur and Kozhikode. The nearest railway station is at Kozhikode.
