= Kalanthode =

Rural area in Kozhikode, Kerala, India

Coordinates: 11.3153°N 75.9548°E

Kalanthode is a fast-growing rural area near to the National Institute of Technology Calicut, in the Kozhikode district of the Indian state of Kerala.

== Nearby Education Institutions ==
There are many educational institutions there.

- KMCT College of Engineering
- KMCT Polytechnic college
- KMCT School of Business Management
- KMCT college of Teacher Education
- MES Raja Residential School
- MES Arts and Science college
- Govt Nayarkuzhi School
- Al-Huda English Medium School
- Al-Najath English Medium School

== Nearby places ==
- Mukkam
- Kattangal
- Chathamangalam
- Kunnamangalam
- Koduvally
- Manassery
