= Kattangal =

- town
- Location in Kerala, India
- Coordinates: 11°18′0″N 75°58′30″E
- Country: India
- State: Kerala
- District: Kozhikode

Government
  - Body: Chathamangalam

Languages
  - Official: Malayalam, English
- Time zone: UTC+5:30 (IST)
- PIN: 673601
- Telephone code: 91495228
- Vehicle registration: KL-57
- Nearest city: Kozhikode
- Lok Sabha constituency: Kozhikode
- Civic agency: Chathamangalam

Kattangal is a sub-urban village situated near the National Institute of Technology Calicut, located in Kerala, India. It is located about 22 km away from the city of Kozhikode. Chathamangalam Gramapanchayath is the village administration and this village is a major educational hub in Kerala. The Mavoor–Koduvally Road and Kozhikode–Mukkam Highway are crossing at Kattangal.

== Major educational institutions ==
1. National Institute of Technology Calicut
2. DOEACC DOEACC.
3. Dayapuram Institutions run by Al Islam Charitable Trust .
4. KMCT College of Engineering
5. M.E.S. Raja Residential School
6. Spring Valley School (Official Site)
7. R.E.C. Government Higher Secondary High School
8. Technology Business Incubator TBI-NITC
9. School of management studies..SOMS
10. Naduvilottil group of institutions
11. In its initial years (1997-2002), the Indian Institute of Management, Kozhikode operated from a wing of the NIT Calicut campus in Kattangal. When the IIM K campus' construction was complete, in adjoining Kunnamangalam, the institute shifted there.
12. Kmct Medical College Manassery
13. Alqamar Islamic school Kattangal

== Companies run in Kattangal ==
1. Infinite Open Source Solutions

== Major Hostels ==
=== Ladies Hostels ===
There are three hostels at N.I.T.C residential campus to accommodate female students of UG, PG and Ph. D. of N.I.T.Calicut. Dayapuram Ladies Hostel located at Dayapuram Campus exclusive for Dayapuram students. A Working Women's Hostel is also Functioning at Dayapuram Campus namely Rajiv Gandhi Working Women's Hostel Under Al Islam Charitable Trust.

=== Family Hostels ===
Faculty Apartments at N.I.T.C residential campus are for the PG and Research students staying with their family. Koyyapuram Family Apartments located near Dayapuram Juma Masjid are exclusive for the students of N.I.T.C and Dayapuram Institutions. There are many apartments situated in the nearby Company Mukku region.

=== Boys Hostels ===
There are nine boys' hostels located at N.I.T.C academic for B.Tech. International Hostel (IH) and Faculty Apartments for M. Tech, M.Sci. Tech and MCA students. The Gandhi Boys Hostel in the Dayapuram campus is for Dayapuram Students.

== Neighboring towns and villages ==
- Kunnamangalam
- Koduvally
- Mavoor
- Kalanthode
- Manashery
- Mukkam
- Kodiyathur
- Malayamma
- Parathapoyil
- Karuvanpoyil
- Omassery

== Rivers ==
Manipurampuzha (Kurungattukadave)

== Distance from nearby places ==
- Kozhikode Railway Station 22 km
- Calicut International Airport (CCJ)) 40 km
- Kannur international airport 110 km
- Mukkam 6 km, Koduvally 6 km, Mavoor 7.4 km, Kunnamangalam 7.5 km, thamarassery 16 km, Cheruvadi 8 km

== Hospitals ==
- Amala Clinic, Kattangal jn.
- MVR Cancer Centre & Research Institute, Chuloor
- N.I.T.Calicut Health Centre at N.I.T Campus
- Shanthi Hospital at Omashery
- Mothercare Hospital, Government Health Centre, E.M.S.Hospital and Eye Care Hospital, Mukkam
- St.Joseph Hospital at Agestian Muzhi
- Calicut Medical College
- KMCT Medical College , Manassery.
- Dr Faiz's LuminousDental Clinic, Kattangal

== Bank & ATM ==
1. State Bank Of India CREC Branch
2. Kattangal Service Co Operative Bank Ltd
3. The South Malabar Gramin Bank Ltd, Kettangal Branch
4. Calicut City Service Co-operative Bank at MVR Cancer Centre Choloor
- SBI ATM at SBI Branch
- SBI ATM Opposite N.I.T.Main Canteen
- SBI ATM inside NITC campus
- Punjab National Bank ATM in SOMS campus
- Axis Bank ATM at MVR Cancer Centre Choloor
