= Muttanchery =

Coordinates: 11°20′24″N 75°52′02″E

- town
- Interactive map of Muttanchery
- Time zone: UTC+5:30 (IST)
- PIN: 673585
- Nearest city: Kozhikode
- Lok Sabha constituency: Kozhikode
- Vidhan Sabha constituency: Koduvally

Muttanchery is a village in Kozhikode district in the Indian state of Kerala. It is part of Madavoor Grama Panchayat in Koduvally block. It is a place surrounded by hills.

== Geography ==
It is located about 25 km east of Kozhikode (Calicut) city on the Kunnamangalam-Narikkuni Road. Nearby places are Kunnamangalam, Narikkuni, and Arambram.

== Education ==
Hassaniya aided upper primary school is located in Muttancherry. The institution came into existence as a primary school in 1935.

== Culture ==
One of the famous Dhargha of Madavoor CM Valiyullahi is 1 kilometer away. TM RANGERS, Crescent arts and sports club, dosth arts and sports club, Red ARTS Muttanchery are the main cultural centres in muttanchery.
