= E N Ibrahim Moulavi =

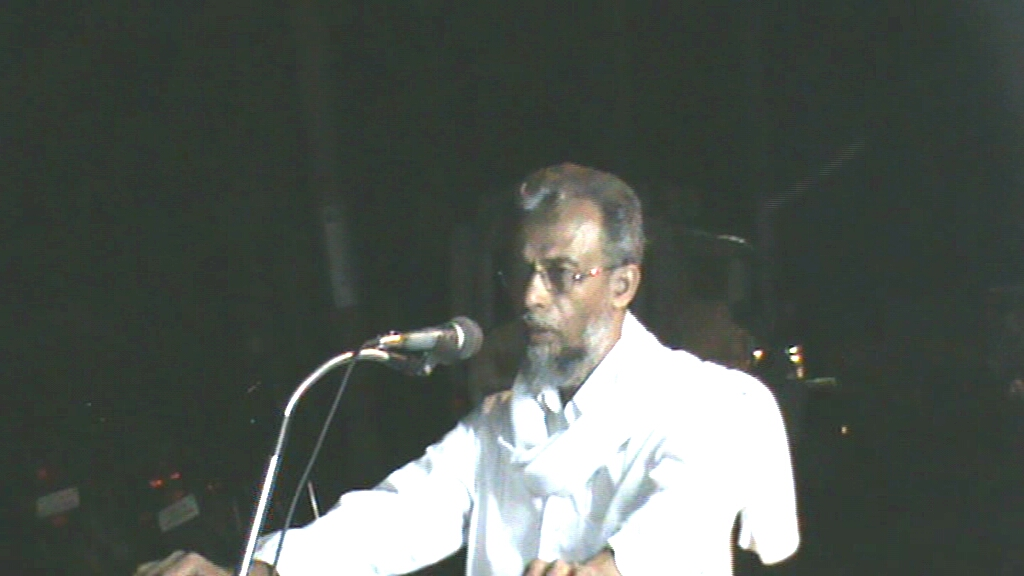
E N Ibrahim Moulavi

EN Ibrahim Moulavi (Malayalam:ഇ എന്‍ ഇബ്രാഹിം മൌലവി ) is an Hafiz and Islamic scholar from Kerala. He has authored many books on Islam. He was the Imam and Khateeb of Masjidul Huda, Cheruvadi.

== Biography ==
E N Ibrahim Moulavi was born to Ezhimala E N Ahmed Musliar and M T Fathima in 1948 at Cheruvadi in Kozhikode district, Kerala. Ezhimala Ahmed Musliar was a reputed Islamic scholar who migrated from Kannur to Cheruvadi. He was the Imam of Cheruvadi Puthiyoth Juma Masjid. He has got seven sons and one daughter and EN Ibrahim is the fourth one. EN Ibrahim's eldest brother EN Mohammed Moulavi is a well known hadeeth scholar of Kerala. Other brothers are also famous Islamic scholars. Ibrahim, after the basic studies from his father studied at different masjids and then at Vazhakkad Darul Uloom, Pattikkadu Jamia Nooriya and Farooq Roudhathul Uloom. He has taught in Vazhakkad Darussalam Madrasa, Shivapuram Islamiya College and Chennamangallur Islahiya College. He was the Khateeb of Masjidul Huda, Cheruvadi for years. He participated with his family in the well known Mubahala which was held at Kodiyathoor in Kozhikode district.

== Select works ==
- Siddique al-Akbar
- Isthigasa Islamika Veekshanathil (Isthigasa - Islamic View)
- Tharaveeh Namaskaram (Tharaveeh Prayer)
- Juz Amma Paribasha (Translation of Juz Amma)
- Pravaajakathwa Parisamaapthi
- Sunnathum Bid'athum
- Sunni Vimarshanangalku Marupadi
- Punya Kendrangalilude
- Mahacharitha Mala - 1 - Pravachanam Pularunnu
- Imam Aboohaneefa

== Translations ==
- Sheeism - Oru Aathma Vicharana
- Kakshi Vazhakku
- Rasool Ameen (co-translator - M A Abdul Salam)
- Nahjul Balagha - Vaagwilaasathinte Raajapaatha
