= Manashery =

Manassery Mannassery
- town
- Location in Kerala, India Manassery (India)
- Coordinates: 11°18′0″N 75°58′30″E
- Country: India
- State: Kerala
- District: Kozhikode

Government
  - Body: Mukkam
  - Member of Parliament: Rahul Gandhi

Languages
  - Official: Malayalam, English
- Time zone: UTC+5:30 (IST)
- PIN: 673602
- Telephone code: 91495229
- Vehicle registration: KL-57
- Nearest city: Kettangal
- Lok Sabha constituency: Wayanad
- Civic agency: Mukkam

Manassery is a small town in Kozhikode district, located about 28 km east of Calicut city. Nearby places are Mukkam, Omassery, Mavoor, Chennamangallur, Kallanthode, Kettangal and Kunnamangalam. KMCT Dental College was established in this village in 2006.

== Institutions ==
1. Gups Manassery established in 1908
2. KMCT School of Business (KSB) established in 2004
3. KMCT College of Teacher Education established in 2005
4. School of Nursing, established in the year 2005
5. KMCT Dental College Established in 2006
6. Ayurveda Medical College was established in 2006
7. National College of Pharmacy established in 1996
8. KMCT MEDICAL COLLEGE established in the year 2008
