= Vattapparapoyil =

Village in Kerala, India

Vattapparapoyil is a small village in Narikkuni Grama Panchayath, Kerala, India. The Narikkuni to Pannoor Road is crossing this village.
