= Karanthur =

Town in Kerala, India

Karanthur is a small town on Wayanad Road (NH 766) near Kunnamangalam, Kerala, India. Karanthur is administered by Kunnamangalam Grama Panchayat. The Punoor puzha, or the Punoor River passes through this locality.

== Institutions and centres ==
- Markaz
  - Markaz Law College
  - Markaz Arts and Science College
  - Markaz Boys Higher Secondary School
  - Markaz English Medium senior secondary school
  - Markaz Girls High School
  - Markaz Unani college
- Navodaya Library and Reading room
- Qadiriyya Islamic Center, Snehapuram
- Karanthur AMLP School Karanthur
- St Aloysius English Medium School, Karanthur
