= IIM Kozhikode Society & Management Review =

- Discipline: Business, management
- Language: English
- Edited by: Debashis Chatterjee

Publication details
- History: Jun 2012
- Publisher: Sage Publications India Pvt. Ltd.
- Frequency: Bi-annually
- Impact factor: 1.8

Standard abbreviations
- ISO 4: IIM Kozhikode Soc. Manag. Rev.

Indexing
- ISSN: 2277-9752 (print); 2321-029X (web)

Links
- Journal homepage; Online access; Online archive

The IIM Kozhikode Society & Management Review is a double-blind peer-reviewed journal. It is published twice a year by SAGE Publications (New Delhi) in association with Indian Institute of Management Kozhikode.

This journal is a member of the Committee on Publication Ethics (COPE).It is edited by Debashis Chatterjee.

== Abstracting and indexing ==
IIM Kozhikode Society & Management Review is abstracted and indexed in:

- Australian Business Deans Council (ABDC)
- Chartered Association of Business Schools (CABS)
- Clarivate Analytics: Emerging Sources Citation Index (ESCI)
- DeepDyve
- Dutch-KB
- Indian Citation Index (ICI)
- J-Gate
- OCLC
- Ohio
- Portico
- ProQuest Central
- ProQuest One Business
- ProQuest: ABI/INFORM Collection
- ProQuest: ABI/INFORM Global
- ProQuest: Asian & European Business Collection
- ProQuest: India Database
- Proquest: Business Premium Collection
- Research Papers in Economics (RePEc)
- SCOPUS
- UGC-CARE (GROUP II)
