= Calicut Mini Marathon =

Annual running and sporting event in India

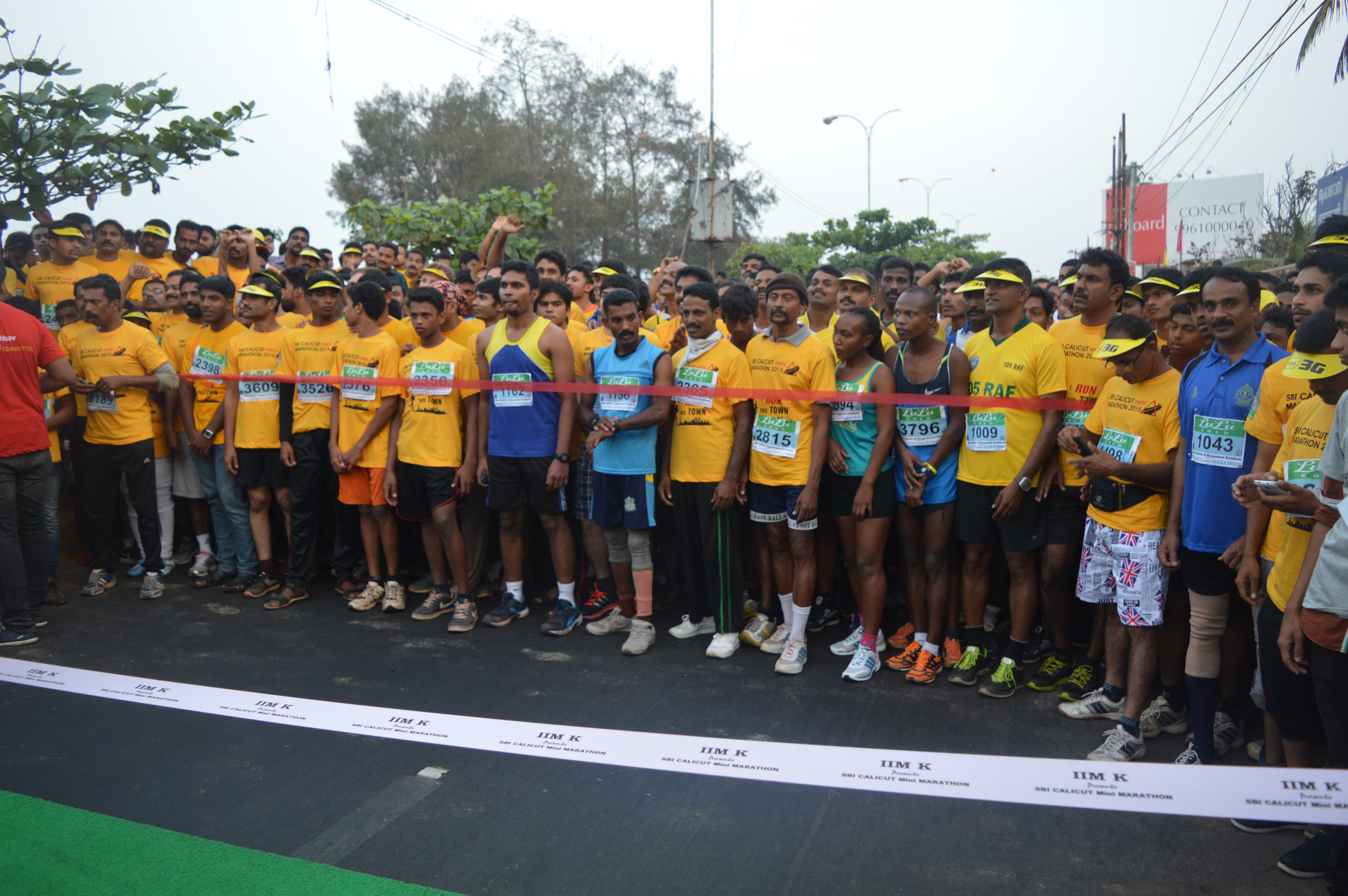
- Calicut Half Marathon - 2015 Flag off
- Date: 3rd March 2024
- Location: Kozhikode, Kerala, India
- Event type: Road
- Distance: 21 km, 10 km, 3 km(not timed)
- Established: 2010
- Website: https://www.calicutmarathon.in/

Calicut Half Marathon is a running and sporting event conducted annually by IIM Kozhikode. First initiated in 2010, the event now takes place annually in the month of February or March. Over 5000 people participate in the marathon every year. The event consists of timed races of 21 kilometres and 10 kilometres and a non-competitive "Dream Run" of 3 kilometres, which is not timed. The total prize money for both the men's and Women's categories combined for the timed races is INR 4,50,000.

Every year the race is associated with a social cause, which it seeks to publicise. The 2019 edition of the marathon also witnessed the debut of the IIM Kozhikode National Excellence Award, with the first edition presented to Paralympic athlete Dr. Deepa Malik, by the director of the Indian Institute of Management Kozhikode Prof. Debashis Chatterjee.

== History ==
=== 2010 ===
The inaugural edition was held on 31 January 2010. The theme of the event was Be the change. It was organized by the Social Service Group, Indian Institute of Management Kozhikode, PT Usha School of Athletics and Calicut Management Association. It aimed to bring forth awareness in them about the various issues plaguing the society and urge them to lead by example, to be the change we wish to see in this world, as Mahatma Gandhi asked of Indians.

=== 2011 ===
This edition of the marathon was for rights of the disabled children. The marathon was co-hosted by Federal Bank. The marathon aimed to induce a change in mindset of the society with regards the way we perceive the disabled. Students from NIT Calicut, Farooq College, Holy Cross College and KMCT Polytechnic college participated in the marathon.

=== 2012 ===
The 2012 Marathon was held on 26 February 2012. The marathon was organized in association with Thantedam Gender park of Kozhikode, promoted by Sri. M K Muneer, the Minister for Social Welfare and Panchayat, Government of Kerala. The marathon highlighted issues such as dowry, domestic violence, security, health and economic visibility faced by women in Kerala. The mini marathon was flagged off by film director and actor, Revathi. The race day featured 10-km professional run and 3-km non-competitive 'Dream run', featuring celebrities, college students and women showcasing their work on the theme Empowering her future along the mini-marathon route. Young woman achiever Awards were given away at the end of the marathon. A flash-mob and a motor cycle rally were also organised as a part of the marathon.

=== 2013 ===
The 4th edition of the marathon had the theme War on Waste and was held on 24 February 2013. The event started and ended at Calicut beach. The mini marathon comprised a 10 km run conducted separately for men and women and a 3 km dream run which was attended by celebrities, dignitaries and the general public. G Lakshmanan ( Tamil Nadu) of the Indian Army won the first place in the men's category by clocking his win in 28.04 minutes while O P Jaisha (Kerala) of Indian Railways emerged winner in the women's category within 34.21 minutes.

=== 2014 ===
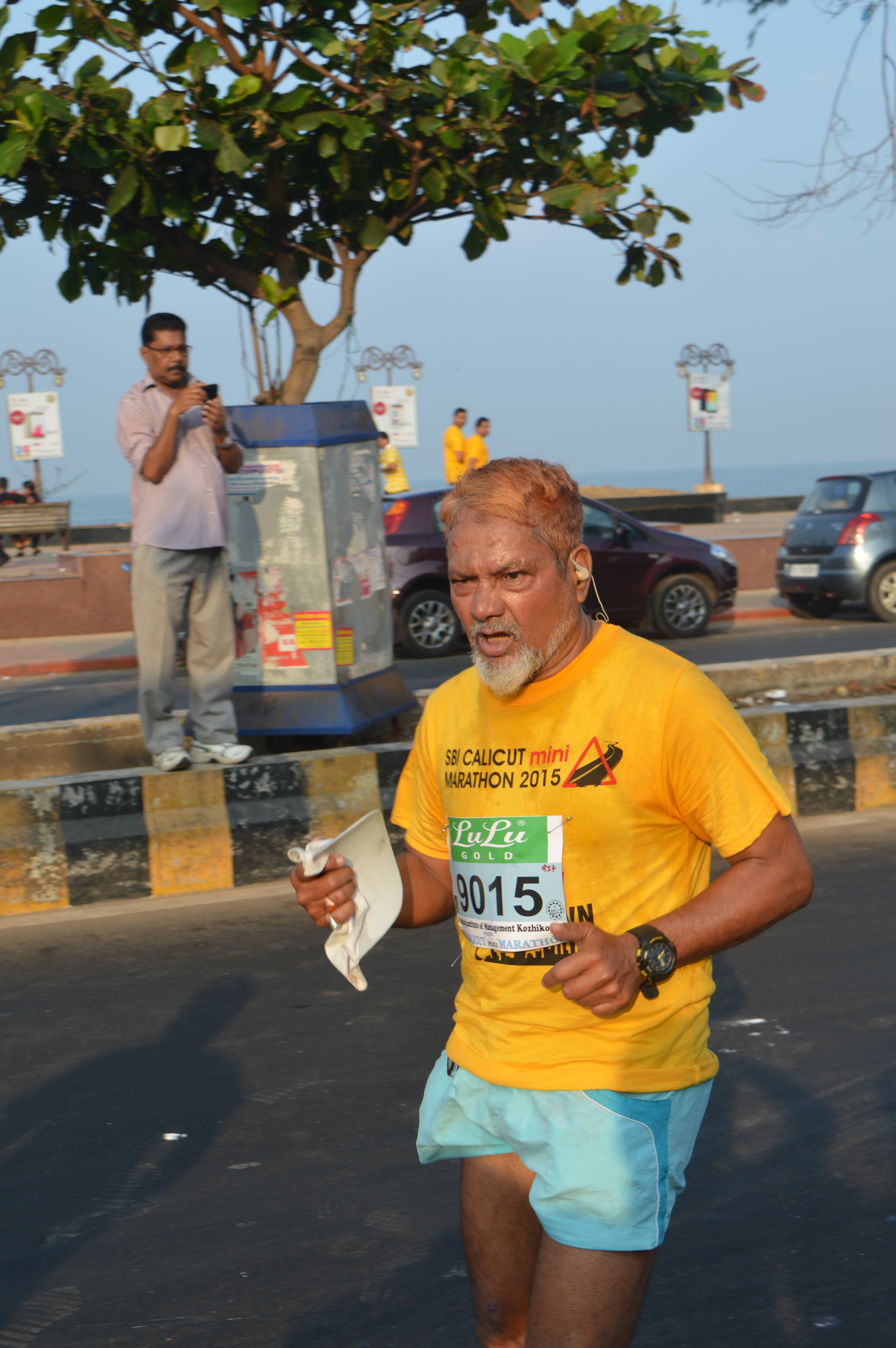
For the spirit of running!

The 5th edition of the marathon was held on 23 February 2014. "Gift a life - Organ donation" was the theme in 2014 which had been selected to increase awareness about organ donation in the city of Kozhikode. The event has been organised in association with the Kerala Network for Organ Sharing (KNOS), a government body under the State Health Department and the MOHAN Foundation. The run was flagged off by Minister for Social Justice M.K. Muneer along with the guests of honour - Kozhikode Member of the Parliament M.K. Raghavan and artist Eby N. Joseph from Kottayam.

=== 2015 ===
The 6th edition of the marathon was held on 1 March 2015. Held under the theme, 'Safety doesn't happen by accident', the sixth edition of the marathon and its promotional events endeavored to create attitude and behavioral change among people to become responsible drivers, passengers, pedestrians and cyclists. Over four thousand people, including international runners, took to the city's streets on Sunday to promote the cause of road safety. The event was flagged off by Mayor Prof. A K Premajam at the Kozhikode Beach. Benjamin Kiprop from Kenya won the first place in the men's category of the 10 km race by clocking a time of 28 minutes and 53 seconds. Local runner Binsy Am was the winner in the women's category by finishing off in 40 minutes and 37 seconds.

=== 2016 ===
The seventh edition of Calicut mini Marathon 2016 was held on 28 February 2016 supporting the cause of 'Compassionate Kozhikode'. With the aim of promoting the cause, we conducted various promotional events like Bike rally, Sand Sculpture at Calicut Beach, Flash Mobs, Mananchira clean-up drive which enabled us to spread the message to a greater audience. The bike rally, organized by the students of IIM Kozhikode in association with Royal Enfield, formed part of a series of promotional events leading up to Calicut mini Marathon 2016. The race day witnessed around 5000 runners from across the world participating in the event.

=== 2017 ===
The eighth edition (2017) was a massive success with over 5,000 registrations representing various cities, age groups and strata of the society. The marathon was a means to raise awareness about a healthy lifestyle. The race featured two categories, a 10 km mini-marathon which is a competitive race and a 3 km "Dream Run", a non-competitive run featuring people from all walks of life.

=== 2018 ===
On its 21st anniversary, IIM Kozhikode launched the ninth edition of Peekay Steel Calicut Half-Marathon. IIM Kozhikode organized the Calicut Half-Marathon 2018 on 25 February 2018. The event launch ceremony was held on 17 January 2018 (at Calicut Press Club) and was inaugurated by the deputy mayor – Ms Meera Darshak. The theme for the Marathon is ‘Eco-Friendly Kozhikode’. The race featured three categories, a 21 km half-marathon, a 10 km mini-marathon and a 3 km "Dream Run", a non-competitive run featuring people from all walks of life.

=== 2019 ===
The tenth edition of the Calicut Half Marathon was held on 24 February 2019 in the Calicut Beach area. The theme for the 2019 half marathon was 'UNITED KERALA: UPHOLDING THE LEGACY’ aimed at celebrating the spirit of unity shown during the past and bringing people together to help create a better tomorrow. The different categories combined saw a participation of more than 5000 runners.

The Director of IIM Kozhikode, Prof. Debashis Chatterjee awarded the first edition of the IIMK National Excellence Award on behalf of the IIM Kozhikode community to Dr. Deepa Mailk (Padma Shri, Arjuna Awardee). According to Prof. Debashis Chatterjee, "IIMK prides itself in empowering women and wishes to highlight the importance of women in all spheres of life. Dr. Deepa Malik is the personification of focus and determination. We hope that this event inspires all the runners taking part in the Marathon, encourages them to pursue their dreams despite all odds and stand united in their endeavours. This is inspired by the theme of the marathon, ‘United Kerala’.

2020

The eleventh edition of the Calicut Half Marathon held on - had a theme, 'Pursuit of Happiness: Healthy Body, Healthy Mind.'

2021

The twelfth edition of the Calicut Half Marathon was the first edition of the run conducted virtually because of the pandemic. The theme for this year was ‘Better Together: United Despite Distances’ and was conducted between the 9th - 11 April 2021.

2023

The thirteenth edition of the Calicut Half Marathon marked the return of the offline run after a virtual event the previous year. The theme for this inspiring run was 'Run for Unsung Heroes: Sanitation Workers.' The event took place on 5 March 2023.
