= Chathamattom =

Village in Kerala, India

Chathamattom ചാത്തമറ്റം
- Village
- Location within Kerala Location within India
- Coordinates: 10.022°N 76.727°E
- Country: India
- State: Keralam
- District: Ernakulam
- Taluk: Kothamangalam

Government
  - Body: Paingottor Panchayath

Area
  - Total: 21.22 km^{2} (8.19 sq mi)

Population (2016)
  - Total: 8,221
- Time zone: UTC+5.30 (IST)
- PIN code: 686671
- Area code: 0485
- Vehicle registration: KL-44

Chathamattom (Malayalam: ചാത്തമറ്റം), also spelled Chathamattam, is a village in Ernakulam district, Kerala, India. It is located in the Paingottoor Gram panchayat. Chathamattom is 4 kilometres away from Paingottoor. Kadavoor is listed as a revenue village under Chathamattom. The nearest towns are Kothamangalam, Muvattupuzha, and Thodupuzha.

== Etymology ==
The etymology of Chathamattom varies with various local interpretations and theories:

- Despite popular assumptions linking the name to the local folk deity Chathan, local historians and researchers state there is no historical or linguistic connection to the deity.
- According to local historians, the village historically possessed high agricultural yields, which sustained prosperity even during economic hardship such as the World War I era. The abundant harvests enabled residents to host lavish community feasts, prompting sarcastic comparisons with elaborate shraddham (Malayalam: ശ്രാദ്ധം) (post-funeral remembrance ritual) feasts. It is theorised that Shradhamattam gradually mutated into Chathamattom through everyday speech.
- Another widely accepted theory attributes the name to Shasthamattom, meaning the "abode of Shastha" (Lord Ayyappa). Chathamattom has a long-standing tradition of Ayyappa worship, evidenced by the remains of an ancient Temple site near the riverbank at Pullattumadathumpadi. Historians note that the phonetic shift from the prefix Shastha to Chatha is a common linguistic pattern observed in several place names throughout Keralam.
- Chathamattom is the amalgamation of two Malayalam words: Chatha and mattom. Chatha is derived from the words Chatha (Malayalam: ചത്ത, lit. 'Dead') and Chatham (Malayalam: ചാത്തം, lit. 'A funeral ceremony for deceased relations and ancestors and also the anniversary of the same'). "Mattom" (Malayalam: മറ്റം) means 'place', 'locality' or 'region'. Hence, Chathamattom means "dead place" (Malayalam: ചത്ത മറ്റം), which, according to ancestors, this region is historically known for an event or phenomenon linked to "death", and many people have died in this region in the past. The cause of their deaths is unknown.

Chathamangalam, a village in the Kozhikode district also shares the word Chatha and is also linked to many deaths.

In English, both spellings, Chathamattom and Chathamattam, are used interchangeably.

== History ==
Oral history indicates Chathamattom may have contributed to weapon production during the Chera or Chola periods, supported by its proximity to the Muvattupuzha River for transport. The ordnance factory of the ancient kingdom (Thrikkariyoor-the oldest capital of Chera Dynasty) was situated here. At that time, Chathamattam was known as Shasthavumattam. Black melted stones or dross (Malayalam: കീടൻ കല്ലുകൾ, romanized: Keedon Kallukal) broken into pieces when thrown in the fire are commonly found in some dry lands here, which is evidence for an ordnance factory.

Remnants of slag-like material found in the surrounding area suggest early iron processing.

On May 24, 1813, a rare white elephant fell into a pit dug for catching elephants by a local named Mullankatt Neelakandan in the surrounding hills. The discovery coincided with the birth year of Maharaja Swathi Thirunal Rama Varma and was considered an auspicious omen by the Travancore royal family. Rani Gowri Lakshmi Bayi reportedly wrote to British Resident Colonel Thomas Munro about the finding (a copy of which is preserved locally and in state archives). To mark the bicentenary of this event in 2013, a white elephant sculpture was installed at the Government Higher Secondary School in Chathamattom.

== Geography ==
An environmental sightseeing place in Chathamattom is "Pothencheeni Kunnu" (a hill above 300 meters high). The distant view of the metro city Kochi can be seen from the hill. There is also a Reserve Forest on the Mullaringadu-Chathamattom Road.

== Economy ==
Agriculture is the main occupation of people. Rubber, ginger, turmeric, coconut, cocoa, paddy, black pepper (Idukki Gold or black gold), plantain, pineapple and tapioca are commonly cultivated. The main production and staple food is rice. In 2014, the Periyar Valley Irrigation Project was launched by the state Water Resource Department to solve the water scarcity caused by paddy cropping in Chathamattam and Ottakkandam areas in the Paingottoor panchayat during water crisis.

== Education ==
- Government Higher Secondary School (GHSS) is situated on the Mullaringadu-Chathamattom Road.
- Sree Narayana Guru College Of Arts & Sciences

== Major institutions ==
- St. George's Malankara Syrian Catholic Church, Chathamattom
- Carmel St. Peter's & St. Paul's Orthodox Church
