= Palangad =

Palangad ( പാലങ്ങാട്)
- Village
- Location in Kerala, India Palangad ( പാലങ്ങാട്) (India)
- Coordinates: 11.3983°N 75.8655°E
- Country: India
- State: Kerala
- District: Kozhikode District

Government
  - Type: India. Democratic

Languages
  - Official: Malayalam, English
- Time zone: UTC+5:30 (IST)
- PIN: 673572
- Vehicle registration: KL76

Palangad is a village in the Kozhikode District of Kerala, India.

Palangad is approximately 25 km from Kozhikode (Calicut) city and connected to Calicut Medical College and Narikkuni by road.

There are two schools in Palangad village, A.M.L.P.Palangad and Punnassery A.U.P. School One unaided school run by MES. The famous Palangad pally (Masjid) is situated at Palangad. The pally runs an institution for students with expenses carried out by the believers under the area of this Masjid and management itself. The Puthiyakaavu Sree Bhagavathi temple is situated in Mele Palangad area. Many devotees come here from all parts of Kerala.

Popular attractions in Palangad include the Kuttichathan Para and the Nattikkallu, a large rock 25 meters high. Some ancient caves were found in the border area of Palangad, near Kuttamboor. A mixed life of Muslims and Hindus can be seen there.

The places bordering this small village are Pannikkotur and Kuttamboor. The nearest town is Elettil Vatooli located approximately 3 km away.
