= Chennamangallur =

- town
- Location in Kerala, India
- Coordinates: 11°18′0″N 75°58′30″E
- Country: India
- State: Kerala
- District: Kozhikode

Government
  - Member of Parliament: Priyanka Gandhi Vadra
  - MLA: George M Thomas

Population
  - Total: 1,200

Languages
  - Official: Malayalam, English
- Time zone: UTC+5:30 (IST)
- PIN: 673602
- Telephone code: 229
- Vehicle registration: KL-57
- Lok Sabha constituency: Wayanad
- Website: [ www.chennamangallur.com%20/%20chennamangallur]]

Chennamangaloor, also spelt as Chennamangallur and/or Chendamangallur is a village located in Kozhikode district, Kerala, India. It is about 27 km (17 mi) from the town of Kozhikode. The National Institute of Technology Calicut (NITC), the Indian Institute of Management Kozhikode (IIM-K), K.M.C.T. are located near to Chennamangallur.

== Notable people ==
- K. C. Abdullah Moulavi, Former Jamaat-e-Islami Kerala
- O Abdurahiman, journalist and author, Group Editor Madhyamam and Media One TV
- Hameed Chennamangaloor, social critic
- O Abdulla Journalist, Social Critique, Writer
- CT Abdurahim, writer and educator
- Mubsid T.K , Media, Digital Content Creator
