= Korapuzha =

River in Kerala, India

Location
- Country: India

Physical characteristics
- Source
  - location: Arikkankunni
  - elevation: 610 m (2,000 ft)
- Mouth
  - location: Arabian Sea
- Length: 40 km (25 mi)
- Basin size: 624 km^{2} (241 sq mi)

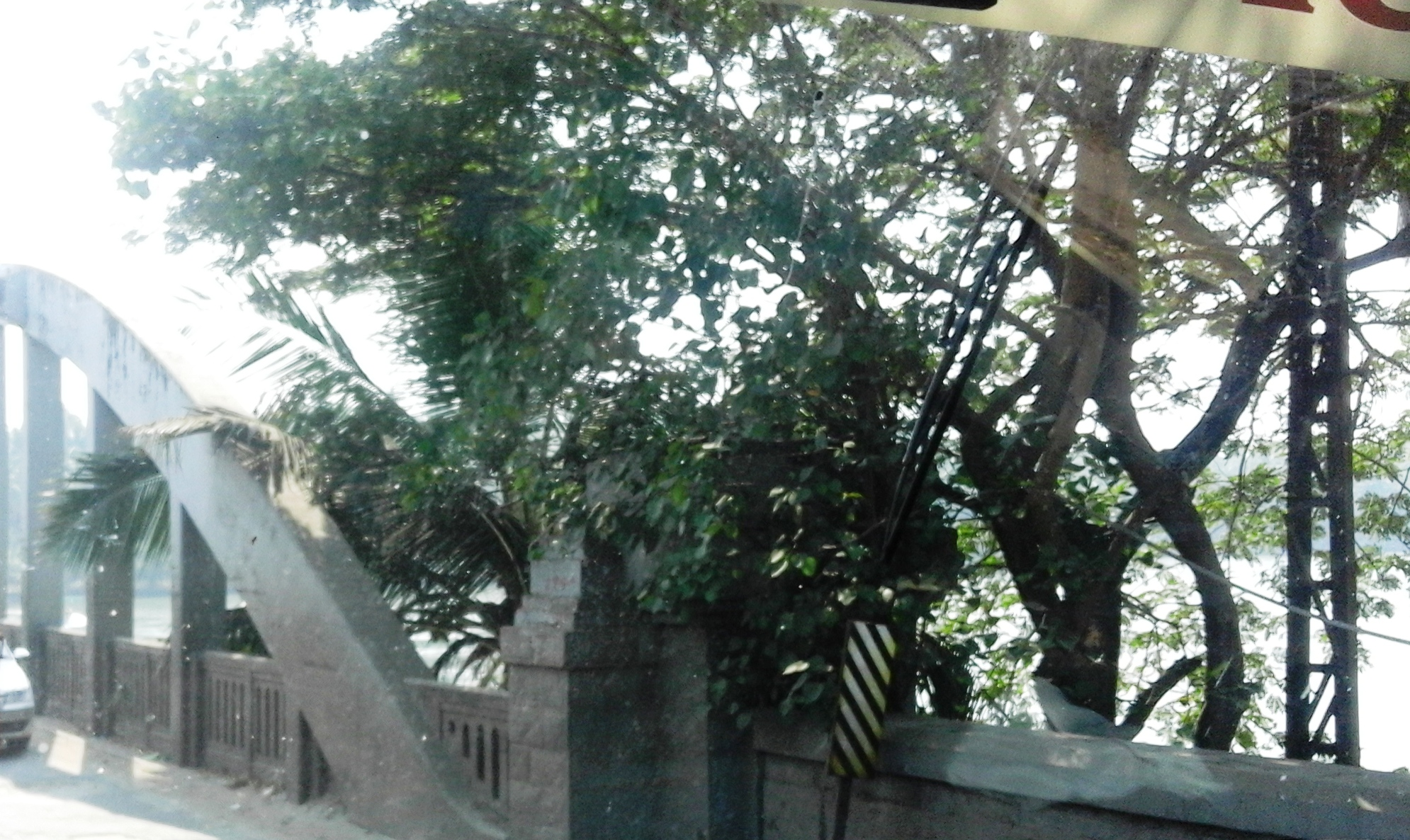
Korappuzha Road Bridge

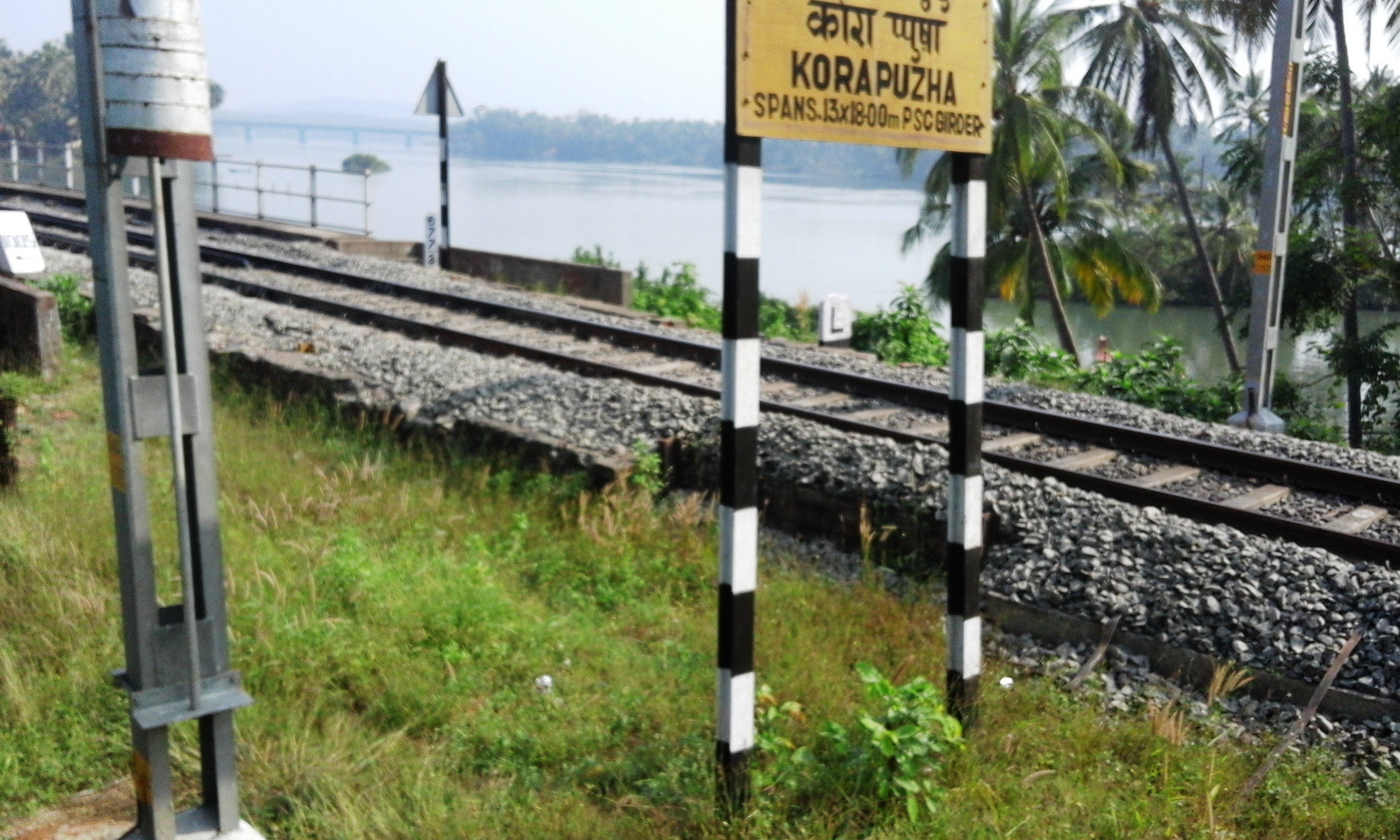
Korappuzha Railway Bridge

Korapuzha, also known as Elathur River, is a short river of 40 km (25 mi), with a drainage area of 624 km^{2} (241 mi^{2}), flowing through the Kozhikode district of Kerala state in India. It is formed by the confluence of two streams, Akalapuzha Lake, situated in the Kozhikode and Punoor puzha which originate in the mountains of Wayanad district. The Korapuzha empties into the Arabian Sea at Elathur. The river and its main tributaries become tidal as they near the Arabian Sea. There is heavy boat traffic over the last 25 km (16 mi) of its course. It forms part of the West Coast Inland Navigation System.

== Korappuzha bridge ==
This 480-metre bridge is the longest bridge in Kozhikode district. Completed in 1940, it has 13 spans. The surroundings are lush green and very photogenic.

== History ==
The river for some times formed the northern border of the Zamorin's kingdom. The Korapuzha is generally considered as the cordon sanitaire between the North Malabar and South Malabar in the erstwhile Malabar District. Until the 20th century the Nair women of North Malabar crossing the Korapuzha and going South Malabar or marrying a person from South Malabar was considered a taboo and those who violated faced Bhrasht (Ostracism) and forfeiture of caste. The prohibition in North Malabar and South Malabar began with the rivalry between the Kolathunad rulers of North Malabar and the Zamorin of South Malabar. At the same time, the Kolathunad dynasty maintained good relations with the Travancore-Venad Kingdom and the Tulu Kingdom. Travancore royal family is a close cousin dynasty of the Kolathiris of North Malabar.
