= Dayapuram Educational and Cultural Centre =

Institutional campus in Kerala, India

Dayapuram Institutions
- Other name: Ansari Orphanage
- Type: Education
- Established: 1984
- Affiliations: State Orphanage Control Board; CBSE; Madurai Kamaraj University; Calicut University
- Location: Kettangal, Kerala, India; 11°19′19″N 75°56′07″E
- Campus: 48 acres (190,000 m^{2})
- Website: www.dayapuram.org

Dayapuram is an institutional campus in Kerala, India. It is named for a part of the village Kattangal, near Kunnamangalam in Kozhikode district. In Malayalam, the word "Dayapuram" means "the land of kindness".

== Institutions ==
1. Ansari Orphanage, established in 1984
2. Dayapuram Residential School (1984)
3. Madrasathul Mufthah (1984)
4. Dayapuram Nursery School (1984)
5. Dayapuram Arts and Science College for women (2002 )
6. Madurai Kamaraj University Distance Education Center
7. Dayapuram Juma Musjid, general mosque
8. Zainab Musjid, a mosque for women only
9. Dayapuram Library

=== Hostels ===
- Girls Hostel
- Working Woman's Hostel

== History ==
The school was established in 1984 as an English Medium School near to the National Institute of Technology Calicut, (formerly R.E.C. Calicut), their aim was to bring educationally backward situations into the mainstream, especially for orphans. Orphans from all religions are admitted without regard to financial circumstances. Shaik Abdulla Ibrahim Al Ansari, was their main financial source. In 1986, Ansari formally inaugurated Qatar Calendar House and Dayapuram Residential School gets affiliation of the Central Board of Secondary Education, New Delhi in 1986.

== Organisation ==
All institutions are under Al Islam Charitable Trust.
