= Madavoor, Kozhikode =

Madavoor Madavoor
- village
- Location in Kerala, India Madavoor (India)
- Coordinates: 11°21′0″N 75°52′0″E
- Country: India
- State: Kerala
- District: Kozhikode

Government
  - Body: Panchayath

Population (2011)
  - Total: 28,672

Languages
  - Official: Malayalam, English, Hindi
- Time zone: UTC+5:30 (IST)
- PIN: 673585
- Vehicle registration: KL-57
- Nearest city: Koduvally, Narikkuni, Kunnamangalam
- Climate: good (Köppen)
- Website: Madavoor.Org

Madavoor is a village and Gram Panchayat in Koduvally Municipality in Kozhikode district of Kerala, India.

== Demographics ==
As per the census of India, 2011, Madavoor had a population of 28,672 of which 13,747 were males and 14,925 were females. Part of Madavoor Gram Panchayat is the hamlet of Muttancherry.

== Economy ==
Agriculture is the main source of livelihood for the inhabitants of this village.

== Notable institutions ==
- Madavoor CM Makham
- CM Centre
- IFER Academy

== Notable persons ==
- Abdul Azeez Madani (1950–2022)
- Hussain Madavoor

== Transportation ==
This village connects to other parts of India through Calicut city on the west and Thamarassery town on the east. National highway No.66 passes through Kozhikode and the northern stretch connects to Mangalore, Goa and Mumbai. The southern stretch connects to Cochin and Trivandrum. The eastern National Highway No.54 going through Adivaram connects to Kalpetta, Mysore and Bangalore. The nearest airport is Kozhikode International Airport. The nearest railway station is at Kozhikode Railway Station.
