= Paingottoor =

- Village
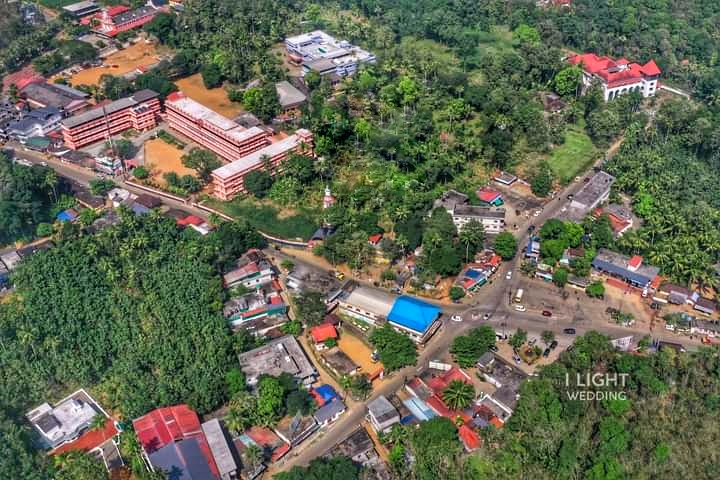
- Paingottoor city in 2019

- Location within Kerala Location within India
- Coordinates: 10.007°N 76.710°E
- Country: India
- State: Kerala
- District: Ernakulam
- Taluk: Kothamangalam

Area
  - Total: 23.5 km^{2} (9.1 sq mi)

Population (2011)
  - Total: 15,336
- Time zone: UTC+5.30 (IST)
- PIN code: 686671
- Area code: 0485
- Vehicle registration: KL 44

Paingottoor is a village in the Ernakulam district of Kerala state, India. It is one of the gram panchayats in Kothamangalam Taluk. It is located in the eastern part of the Ernakulam district and is bordered by the Idukki district. Paingottoor is 14 kilometres away from Kothamangalam, 16 kilometres away from Muvattupuzha and 15 kilometres away from Thodupuzha along State Highway 44 connecting Pamba and Kodaikanal. Chathamattom is 4 kilometres away from Paingottoor and is located in Paingottoor gram panchayat.

Kedavoor (Kadavoor) revenue village represents Paingottoor gram panchayat jurisdiction at the Department of Land Revenue.
