= Hussain Madavoor =

Indian Islamic scholar and educationalist

PK Hussain Madavoor (Malayalam: ഹുസൈൻ മടവൂർ, born 1 November 1956) is an Indian Islamic scholar, educationalist and social activist from Kerala, India. He is known for his work in promoting peace, interfaith harmony, educational development, and campaigns against liquor and drug abuse. He is one of the Muslim scholars who said that burqa is not recommended.

== Early life and education ==
Madavoor is born in Madavoor, Kozhikode on 1 November 1956. He is the son of late Aboobacker Koya. He is married to Salma and together they have five sons. He obtained bachelor’s degrees from the University of Calicut and Umm Al-Qura University, Makkah. He later completed his master’s degree from Aligarh Muslim University and earned a PhD from the University of Calicut.

== Career ==
He served as the Kerala State Coordinator in the Ministry of Minority Affairs, Government of India, and was the President of the Asian chapter of the World Association of Humanitarian Organisations. He retired as the Principal of Rouzathul Uloom Arabic College, an institution affiliated with the University of Calicut. He is also a member of the academic council of the University of Calicut. He is also the Imam of the Palayam Juma Masjid in Kozhikode. He also served as the general secretary of All-India Islahi movement. In September 2015, he addressed Indian expatriates in Jeddah.

Hussain Madavoor is the Vice President of Kerala Nadvathul Mujahideen and has also served as a member of the Kerala State Wakf Board. In June 2024, he resigned as the vice-chairperson of the Navodhana Samrakshana Samithi, which translates to Renaissance Protection Forum. It is a collective of religious leaders supported by the State government of Kerala. He was protesting against a remark by Vellappally Natesan, chairperson of the samithi, who said that Muslims are taking undue favours from the LDF government.

He has participated in and addressed several national and international conferences on peace, interfaith dialogue, and humanitarian cooperation. Through his academic, philanthropic, and community engagements, he has been active in social reform initiatives and humanitarian activities in Kerala and beyond.

In June 2025, he opposed Zumba being implemented in schools in Kerala. Zumba is a sort of dance to help physical and mental health of the students. In April 2024, he gave a call to all Muslims to skip Umrah and leisure trips, and take part in voting.

He is one of the Muslim scholars who said that burqa or niqab is not recommended in Quran and supported the ban of burqa by Muslim Educational Society (MES) in its schools.
