= Arambram =

Coordinates: 11°20′N 75°53′E

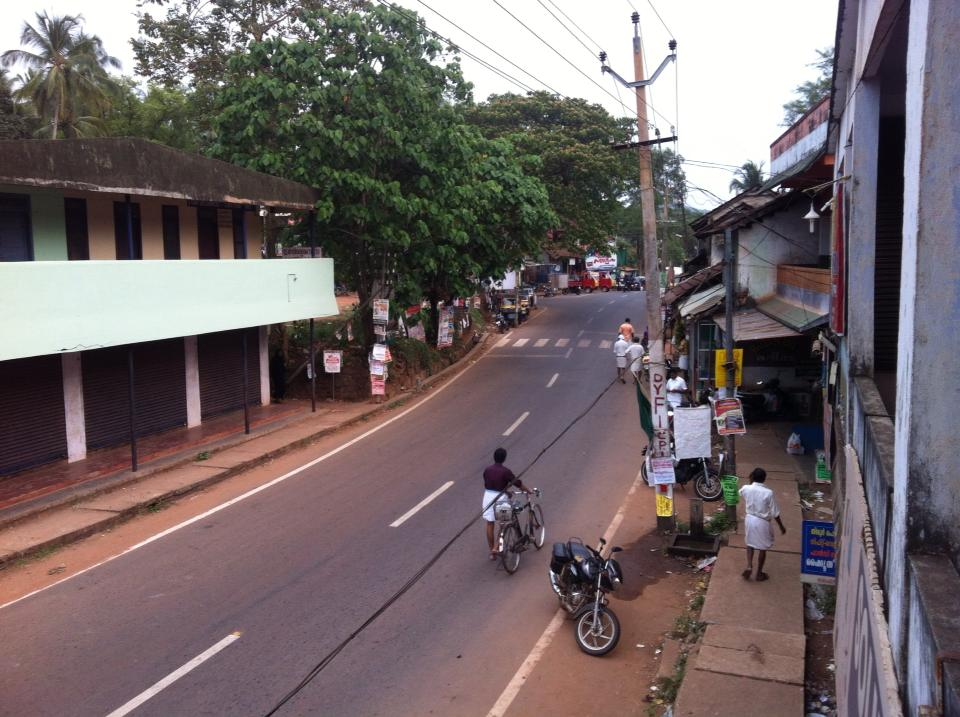
A road in Arambram.

Arambram is a small town near Madavoor, Kerala in India. Arambram is 20 km away from Calicut. It belongs to Madavoor Panchayath, Kozhikode Taluk and Kozhikode district. Arambram uses the Indian Standard Time as its time zone.

== General Information ==
- Arambram pincode is 673571
- Arambram nearest airport is the Calicut Airport.
- Arambram nearest railway station is the Calicut Railway station.
- Arambram has a population of approximately 6,000 people.

== Places of importance ==
=== VMK Botanical Garden ===
The famous VMK Botanical Garden is situated here. In this garden, more than 250 species of plants are protected. Writer VM Koya is the founder of this garden. In 1991, VM Koya started traveling around India and in gulf countries in search of seeds to start his private plantation, now known as the VMK Botanical Garden. This botanical garden has become the habitat of animals and plants of different species.

Tourism department of the Government of Kerala has approved VMK Botanical garden as a tourist destination.

=== Hanging Bridge connecting Arambram to Koduvally Panchayath ===
A hanging bridge connects Arambram to Koduvally Panchayath. This bridge crosses Punoor River. While passing through Calicut Wayanad Highway.
