= Hameed Chennamangaloor =

Abdul Hameed Areepattamannil
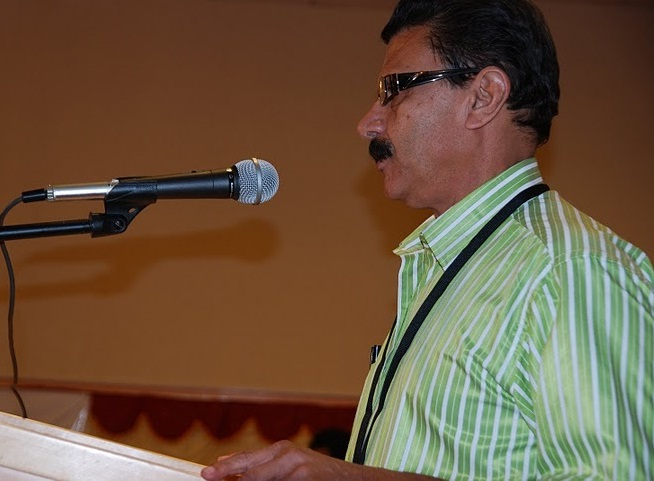
- Hameed Chennamangaloor delivering a speech in Muscat, Oman, on 9 October 2009.
- Born: 1948 (age 77–78); Kerala, India
- Died: Professor, writer, social critic, political analyst
- Spouse: Sabira Kunnumpurath
- Writing career
- Pen name: Hameed Chennamangaloor
- Website: www.chennamangalloor.com

Hameed Chennamangaloor (né Abdul Hameed Areepattamannil; born 1948) is a prominent social critic in Kerala, India. He is a staunch critic of religious fundamentalism.

He was born to Areepattamannil Abdul Salam of Chennamangaloor and Katheeshumma of Perumanna. He had his early education at Chennamangaloor and Mukkam. After earning his BA and MA degrees, he began his career as a probationary officer in State Bank of Travancore. Later, he left the job and took up a job under the Department of Higher Education, Government of Kerala, as a lecturer of English language and literature. He became the Head of the Department of English at Government Arts and Science College, Kozhikode in 2002, a position which he held until his retirement in 2003.

== Selected books ==
- Deivathinte rashtriyam (Politics of God) (Mathrubhumi Books, 2011)
- Marxism, Islamism, Secularism (Mathrubhumi Books, 2009)
- Beegarathayude dhaivashasthram (D. C. Books, 2007)
- Hameed Chennamangaloorinte thiranjedutha lekhanangal (Haritham Books, 2007)
- Matham, rashtreeyam, janadhipathyam (Mathrubhumi Books, 2005)
- Oru Indian Musliminte sothanthra chindhakal (translation)

== Selected articles ==
- Mathrubhumi Weekly, 16 May 2010
