= Chathamangalam =

- village
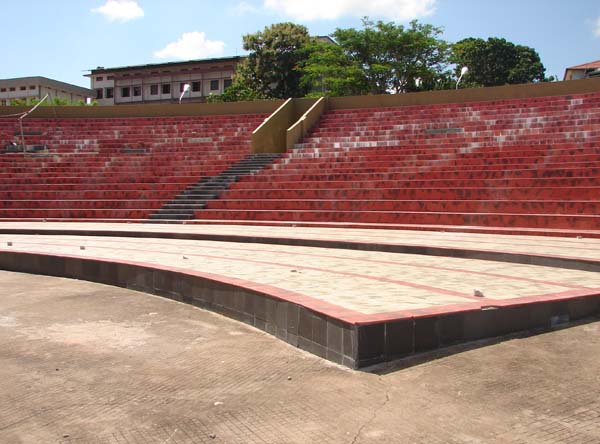
- NIT Stadium
- Interactive map of Chathamangalam
- Coordinates: 11.296°N 75.915°E
- Country: India
- State: Kerala
- District: Kozhikode

Area
  - Total: 40.23 km^{2} (15.53 sq mi)

Population (2026)
  - Total: 90,402
  - Density: 1,521/km^{2} (3,940/sq mi)

Languages
  - Official: Malayalam, English
- Time zone: UTC+5:30 (IST)
- PIN: 673601
- Vehicle registration: KL-
- Nearest city: Kunnamangalam
- Lok Sabha constituency: Kozhikode
- Website: chathamangalam.org

Chathamangalam is a village in Kozhikode district of Kerala state, India.

== Geography ==
Chathamangalam is a Gram Panchayat and an agricultural village comprising hills, valleys, and paddy fields. It spreads over an area of 40.23 km^{2} and is located 20 km east of Kozhikode city. The Cherupuzha River borders the village to the south, west, and north, while the Iruvazhinji borders it to the east. Both these tributaries join the Chaliyar. Chathamangalam came into existence on 24 September 1956. It has twenty-two wards spread across two villages.

== Demographics ==
The population is 90,402 . Of these, 46,819 are women.

== Landmarks ==
The village is known for its educational institutions including the National Institute of Technology Calicut and National Institute of Electronics and Information Technology (NIELIT) (Formerly DOEACC). The village's health infrastructure includes PHC (primary health centre) Choolur and its 9 sub-centres, Ayurveda Hospital Vellanoor, and the government's Homeopathic Hospital Nairkuzhi.

The village has a sub-registrar's office that was established in 1906, a sub-post office with 7 branches, a telephone Exchange, and banks including a State Bank of India, the Chathamangalam Service Co-operative Bank, and the Chathamangalam Urban Bank. The Chathamangalam Public Library and Reading Room was established in 1944 and has eleven libraries.

== History ==
One story regarding the origin of Chathamangalam can be traced back to a fight between two groups who came to see a festival at Chethukadavu. The fight resulted in many deaths; the area was later named Kunnamangalam. The victims were called Chathamangalam, and those who led the fight were called Padanilam. Another story behind Chathamangalam is related to the ancient temple of Chathamangalathappan. It is believed that this temple, which is related to the Guruvayur temple, had its stone laid by Naranathu Bhranthan. As the families of the sorcerers live here, it is called the place of Kuttichathan, or Chathamangalam.

Chathamattom, a village in the Ernakulam district also shares the word Chatha and is similarly linked to many deaths as well.

The market of Chathamangalam is Kattangal. It originated from the name Kettuthangal because the place had been a relief, a place of rest for people who carried heavy loads on the Mukkam-Kozhikode route.

== Attractions ==
The village contains a large variety of religious buildings, including churches, mosques, temples and kavu. Festivals of Nagakali, Kuttichathan and Bhagavathi are popular. The village's Areekulangara Devi temple is on a scale equal to the Kadampuzha Devi temple of the Malappuram district.

Clubs and youth organizations play an active part in the development of culture. There are also mini stadiums in Pazhur and Poolakkode. Football, volleyball and cricket are popular sports in the region.

== Distance from major towns ==
From Calicut (Kozhikode) - 20 km

From Mukkam - 8 km

From Koduvally - 11 km

From Mavoor - 7.3 km

== Transportation ==
Chathamangalam village connects to other parts of India through Calicut city on the west and Thamarassery town on the east. Nearest main town is Mukkam. National highway No.66 passes through Kozhikode and the northern stretch connects to Mangalore, Goa and Mumbai. The southern stretch connects to Cochin and Trivandrum. The eastern National Highway No.54 going through Adivaram connects to Kalpetta, Mysore and Bangalore. The nearest airports are at Kozhikode. The nearest railway station is at Kozhikode.
