= C. T. Abdurahim =

Indian writer

C. T. Abdurahim is a writer, religious scholar and educator.

== Life and work ==
In 1982, he left Qatar and came back to India and with the help of friends, set-up Dayapuram Educational and Cultural Centre. For the last 31 years, he has been coming to Dayapuram everyday including on Sundays and working on improving the quality of this organization.

== Publications ==
- Indiacharithrathinte Randu Mughangal (Two Faces of Indian History, 1971)
- Mathavum Yukthivaadavum (Religion and Atheism, 1971)
- Matham Thathwavum Prayogavum (Religion - Theory and Practice, 1980),
- Swathathrasamaram Nashtappetta Naallukal (Freedom Movement - The Lost Pages, 1982)
- Mathetharathwavum Indian Muslimkallum (Secularism and Indian Muslims, 1982)
- Islamum Idamarukum (Islam and Idamaruku, 1982)
- Pravaachakanmaar (Prophets, 1983)
- Shariat Charchakal (Shariat Discussions, 1985)
- Kulambadikal (Translation of an Arabic Novel, 1985)
- Oru Malayali Musliminte Veritta Chinthakal (The Distinct Thought of Malayali Muslim, 2008)
- Aathmageetham (Poetry collection. The Songs of the Self, 2010)
- Muslim Bheegaravadathinte Thayverukal (The Roots of Muslim Terrorism, 2009-An Islamic critique of Islamism, sold 5000 copies in record time)
