= Debashis Chatterjee =

Indian management professor, author and columnist

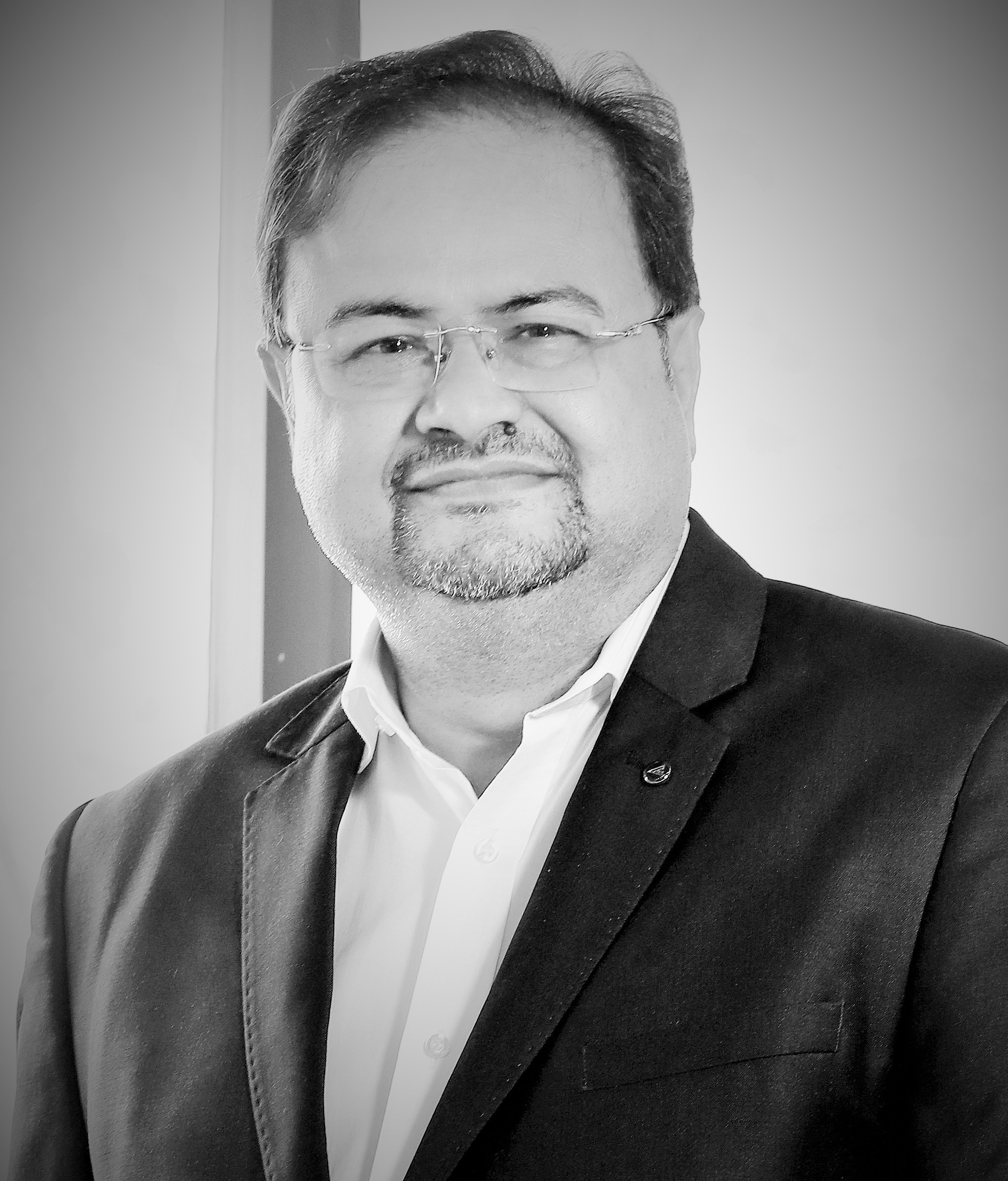

Director Indian Institute of Management, Kozhikode

Personal details
- Born: India
- Education: Jawaharlal Nehru University, New Delhi
- Occupation: Professor, author, columnist
- Website: www.debchat.com

Debashis Chatterjee is an Indian management professor, author, and columnist.. He is the director of Indian Institute of Management Kozhikode. His first tenure was from 2009 to 2014. He was reappointed as Director again in June 2023.

== Education ==
He has been awarded the Fulbright Fellowship as a visiting scholar at the Kennedy School of Government at Harvard University.

== Author ==
=== Books ===
Debashis Chatterjee authored the following works:

- Debashis Chatterjee (2025). One Minute Wisdom: Transformative Coaching for Life, Learning and Leadership. Penguin (published 30 June 2025). pp. 268 pages. ISBN 9780143476245.
- Debashis Chatterjee (2023). Leadership Chronicles: My Experiments with Globalizing Indian Thought. Penguin. pp. 256 pages. ISBN 978-0-670-09865-1.
- Debashis Chatterjee (2022). KRISHNA: The 7th Sense. New Delhi: Rupa Publications India. ISBN 978-93-5520-544-5.
- Debashis Chatterjee (2021). Karma Sutras : Leadership and Wisdom in Uncertain Times. New Delhi: SAGE Publications. ISBN 978-93-5388-695-0.
- Debashis Chatterjee (2016). Invincible Arjuna. Westland Ltd. ISBN 978-93-85152-31-3.
- Debashis Chatterjee (2014). Can You Teach A Zebra Some Algebra?: The Alchemy Of Learning. New Delhi: Wisdom Tree. pp. 168 pages. ISBN 978-81-8328-371-7.
- Debashis Chatterjee (2012). Timeless Leadership:18 Leadership Sutras from the Bhagavad Gita. Wiley India Pvt Ltd. p. 256. ISBN 978-81-265-3665-8.
- Debashis Chatterjee (2011). The Other 99 %. Jaico Publishing House. p. 184. ISBN 978-81-8495-207-0.
- Debashis Chatterjee (2006). Break Free. Penguin Group. p. 160. ISBN 978-0-14-310047-8.
- Debashis Chatterjee (2004). Light the Fire in Your Heart. Full Circle Publishing Ltd. ISBN 978-81-7621-130-7.
- Debashis Chatterjee (1998). Leading Consciously. Taylor & Francis. ISBN 978-1-136-01497-0.

=== Published works ===
- Vasist, P. N., Chatterjee, D., and Krishnan, S. (2023). "The polarizing impact of political disinformation and hate speech: A cross-country configural narrative," Information Systems Frontiers, ahead of print, https://doi.org/10.1007/s10796-023-10390-w. (AJG 2021: 3; ABDC 2022: A)
- Krishnan, S., Chatterjee, D., Vasist, P.N. (2023). Rethinking Nation Branding in the Post-pandemic, Post-truth Era. In: Saini, A., Paul, J., Parayitam, S. (eds) Contemporary Trends in Marketing. Palgrave Studies in Marketing, Organizations and Society. Palgrave Macmillan, Cham. https://doi.org/10.1007/978-3-031-36589-8_5
- Chatterjee, D. (2022). Dharma of Leadership: Wisdom of the Bhagavad Gita in an Uncertain World. In: Mukherjee, S., Zsolnai, L. (eds) Global Perspectives on Indian Spirituality and Management . Springer, Singapore. https://doi.org/10.1007/978-981-19-1158-3_18

== Awards ==
- Bharat Asmita Acharya Shreshtha Award for the Best Teacher in the field of Management, MIT World Peace University, Pune (2019)
- Outstanding Director Award, All India Management Scholars (2013)

== See also ==
- List of Indian writers
