= Kadavoor =

Village in Kerala, India

- village
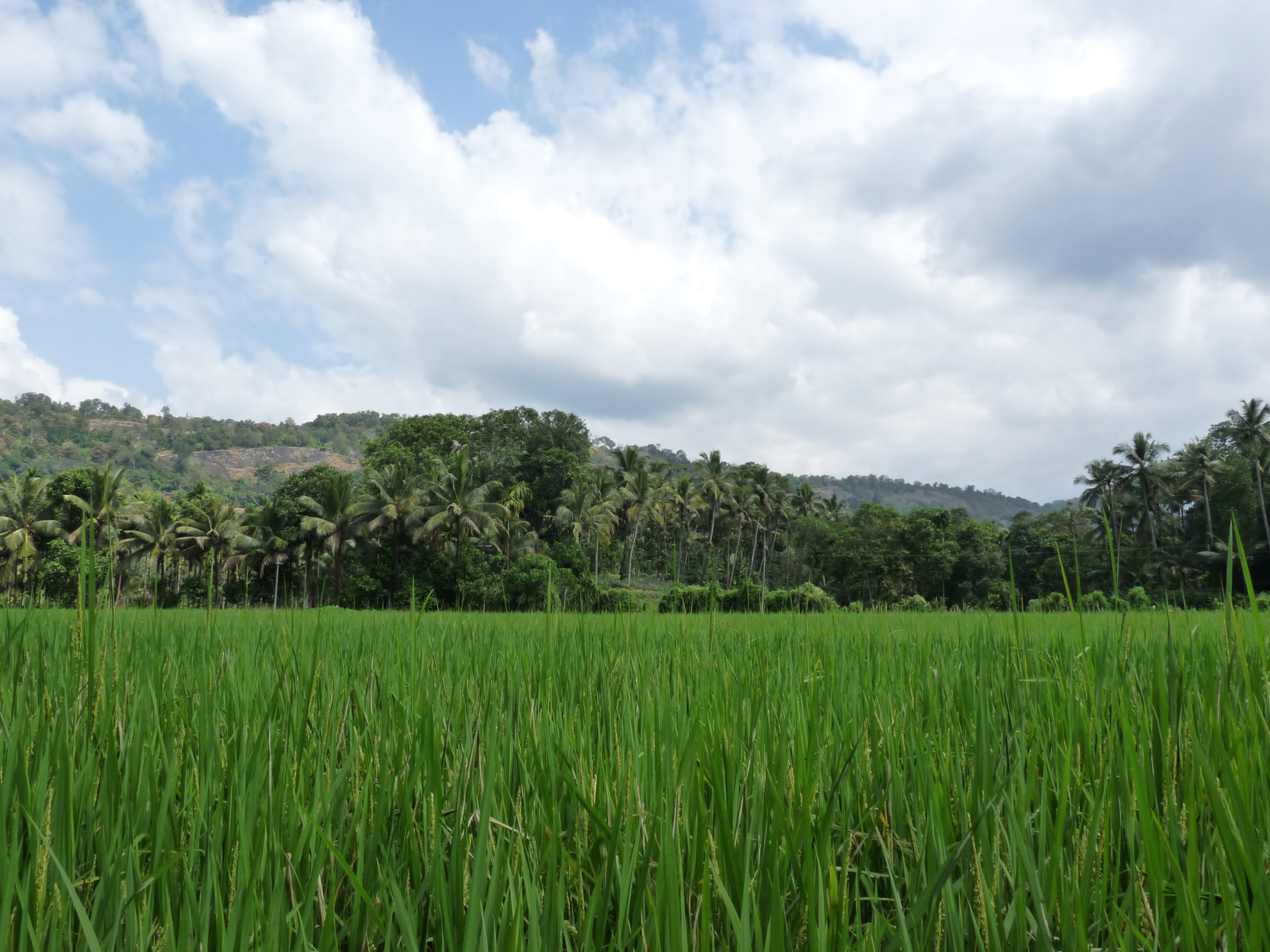
- Paddy fields in Kadavoor

- Location in Kerala, India
- Coordinates: 10°0′0″N 76°44′22″E
- Country: India
- State: Kerala
- District: Ernakulam

Languages
  - Official: Malayalam, English
- Time zone: UTC+5:30 (IST)
- Postal code: 686671
- Telephone code: 0485
- Vehicle registration: KL-44

Kadavoor is a small village in Paingottoor Gram panchayat in Kothamangalam Taluk at the eastern border of the Ernakulam district, state of Kerala, India. It is located about twenty kilometres away from the nearby towns Muvattupuzha, Kothamangalam and Thodupuzha.
