= Cheruvadi =

Cheruvadi Chullikaparamb
- Village
- Location within Kerala
- Coordinates: 11°17′N 76°0′E
- Country: India
- State: Kerala
- District: Kozhikode

Languages
  - Official: Malayalam
- Time zone: UTC+5:30 (IST)
- PIN: 673661
- Telephone code: 0495
- Vehicle registration: KL-57
- Climate: tropical monsoon climate
- Temperature summer avg.: 35 °C (95 °F)
- Temperature winter avg.: 20 °C (68 °F)
- Parliamentary constituency: Wayanad
- Assembly constituency: Thiruvambadi
- Literacy: 95%

Cheruvadi is a village in the Kozhikode district of Kerala. It is located 24 kilometres east of Kozhikode.

== Climate ==
Cheruvadi has a humid and hot climate extending from March to May. The rain starts from June, lasting up to October. The North East Monsoon extends from the second half of October through November. The average annual rainfall is 3313 mm. The best weather is at the end of the year, in December and January, when the sky is clear and the air is crispy. The highest temperature recorded was 37.4 °C in March 2017. The lowest was 14 °C recorded on 26 December 1922.
