= Punoor puzha =

Poonoor River (Poonoor Puzha) is a perennial river in the Kozhikode district of Kerala state in India. It meets Korapuzha and ends in Arabian Sea. It is named from the village of Poonoor in Kozhikode district. Even though the length of river flowing through Poonoor is considerably less, the river carries the name.

Poonoor River is one of the longest in Kozhikode district which irrigates the majority of farming in the district. The river flows through Katharammal and Koduvally.The river is normally very quiet and stream looks almost stationary but the inner flow is forceful. The river originates from the hillock called Arikkankunnu of western ghats.

The rainy season stains the river and some years it floods to make the transportation impossible. In 2007 people died in the flooding of Poonoor puzha.

Environmentalists and nature lovers are much concerned about the preservation of this river as much illegal construction and sand mining kills it.

Other prominent rivers in the district are Korapuzha, Chaliyar Puzha and Iruvanjippuzha. mkc
