= National Institute of Electronics & Information Technology =

Indian deemed university and scientific society

National Institute of Electronics and Information Technology (NIELIT)

Agency overview
- Formed: 9 November 1994 (31 years ago) as DOEACC Society
- Jurisdiction: Government of India
- Headquarters: New Delhi
- Motto: To develop skilled professionals in the area of IECT
- Agency executive: Madan Mohan Tripathi, Director general
- Parent agency: Ministry of Electronics and Information Technology
- Website: nielit.gov.in/index.php

National Institute of Electronics and Information Technology (NIELIT), formerly known as the DOEACC Society, is a society that offers Information Technology and Electronics training at different levels. It is an autonomous scientific society under the administrative control of Ministry of Electronics and Information Technology, Government of India.

NIELIT currently has 56 centers across the country, with its headquarters at New Delhi.

== History ==
The origins of NIELIT can be traced back to 1974 when the Department of Electronics (DoE) and the University Grants Commission (UGC) of India, with assistance from the Swiss Development Corporation, established the first Centre for Electronic Design and Technology (CEDT) at the Indian Institute of Science (IISc), Bangalore. The primary objective was to bridge the gap between academic institutions and the industry by providing specialised training in electronics design. The success of this initiative led the Department of Electronics (later renamed the Department of Information Technology and now the Ministry of Electronics and Information Technology) to set up similar centers across the country.

In 1994, the DOEACC (Department of Electronics Accreditation of Computer Courses) Society was formed. The society was registered under the Societies Registration Act, 1860, with the goal of implementing a scheme for accrediting computer training programs offered by the private sector to meet the growing demand for skilled manpower in information technology. The management and administration of the society were overseen by a Governing Council, chaired by the Minister of State for Communications & Information Technology.

In December 2002, a significant merger took place. Various autonomous societies and centers under the Department of Information Technology, including the CEDT centers in Aurangabad, Calicut, Gorakhpur, Imphal, Srinagar/Jammu, Tezpur/Guwahati, and the Regional Computer Centres (RCC) in Chandigarh and Kolkata, were merged into the DOEACC Society. This consolidation expanded the society's network and scope of operations.

On 10 October 2011, the DOEACC Society was officially renamed the National Institute of Electronics and Information Technology (NIELIT). This change was made to reflect the expanded mandate of the organisation, which had grown beyond simple computer accreditation to a comprehensive role in human resource development, training, and education in the broader fields of electronics and Information and Communication Technology (ICT).

Today, NIELIT functions as an autonomous scientific society under the Ministry of Electronics and Information Technology (MeitY), Government of India. It has a network of over 56 centers, administratively grouped into five regional zones, across the country and is a key implementing agency for various government initiatives aimed at digital literacy, skill development, and e-governance projects. The institute continues to offer a wide range of formal and non-formal courses, including its well-known O, A, B, and C level courses, and plays a vital role as a national examination and accreditation body for non-formal IT and electronics courses.
