= Indian Institute of Management Kozhikode =

Indian autonomous public business school in Kerala

Indian Institute of Management - Kozhikode
- Globalizing Indian Thought
- Motto: Yogaḥ karmasu kauśalam (Sanskrit)
- Motto in English: Diligence leads to Excellence
- Type: Public business school
- Established: 1996; 30 years ago
- Accreditation: AMBA; EQUIS
- Budget: ₹198.03 crore (US$21 million) (2023)
- Director: Debashis Chatterjee
- Academic staff: 83
- Students: 878
- Postgraduates: 804
- Doctoral students: 74
- Location: Kozhikode, Kerala, 673570, India; 11.294294°N 75.873642°E
- Campus: 112.5 acres (45.5 ha); Suburban, 111 acres (0.4 km^{2})
- Language: English
- Heraldry: Clockwise from the top: Arjuna's Bow & Arrow (Focus, Determination, Excellence, Achievement), Book (Wisdom, Knowledge, Learning) and Seascape (Kerala, Heritage)
- Architect: Joseph Allen Stein
- Website: www.iimk.ac.in

The Indian Institute of Management - Kozhikode (IIM - Kozhikode or IIM - K) is an autonomous public business school located in Kozhikode, Kerala, India. The institute, set up in 1996 by the Government of India in collaboration with the Government of Kerala, is one of the 20 Indian Institutes of Management (IIMs). It was the fifth IIM to be established.

The institute conducts academic activities in the field of management education covering research, teaching, and training, consulting and intellectual infrastructure development.

== History ==
Indian Institute of Management Kozhikode was instituted in 1996 by the Government of India in collaboration with the Government of the state of Kerala. The first batch of 42 students commenced in 1997 at the temporary campus at the National Institute of Technology Calicut. In 2000, the site of the present campus at Kunnamangalam was identified. The following year, Joseph Stein (also the architect of the India Habitat Centre in Delhi) and Stein Mani Chowla Architects began the design and construction of the institute. In 2003, IIM Kozhikode started using its hill-top . The then President of India, APJ Abdul Kalam inaugurated the .

Interactive Learning, a hybrid model management education programme for working executives, was introduced in 2001–02. IIM Kozhikode was the first institute in Asia to offer an intense and rigorous learning programme in management for working executives, being given in a blended hybrid model. Having started with 300 class contact hrs in 2001–02, the year-long Executive Management Education Programme is today the richest available in the country having 850+ class contact hours equal to the PGP-BL one year model. The Management Development Programme was also introduced the same year. The institute increased the number of students in PGP to 180 in 2005.In the batch of 2013 the intake is around 361 for PGP. IIMK started its doctoral programme, Fellow Program in Management (FPM) in 2007, now known as the PhD Program. The intake of women in the PGP course was pro-actively increased to 30% from the batch of 2010–12 to increase the number of women in management roles in India. In 2010, IIMK signed a memorandum of understanding with Yale University to establish a Center of Excellence for Academic Leadership as part of Singh-Obama Knowledge Initiative.

IIMK Kozhikode was set up in August 2012.

== Campus ==
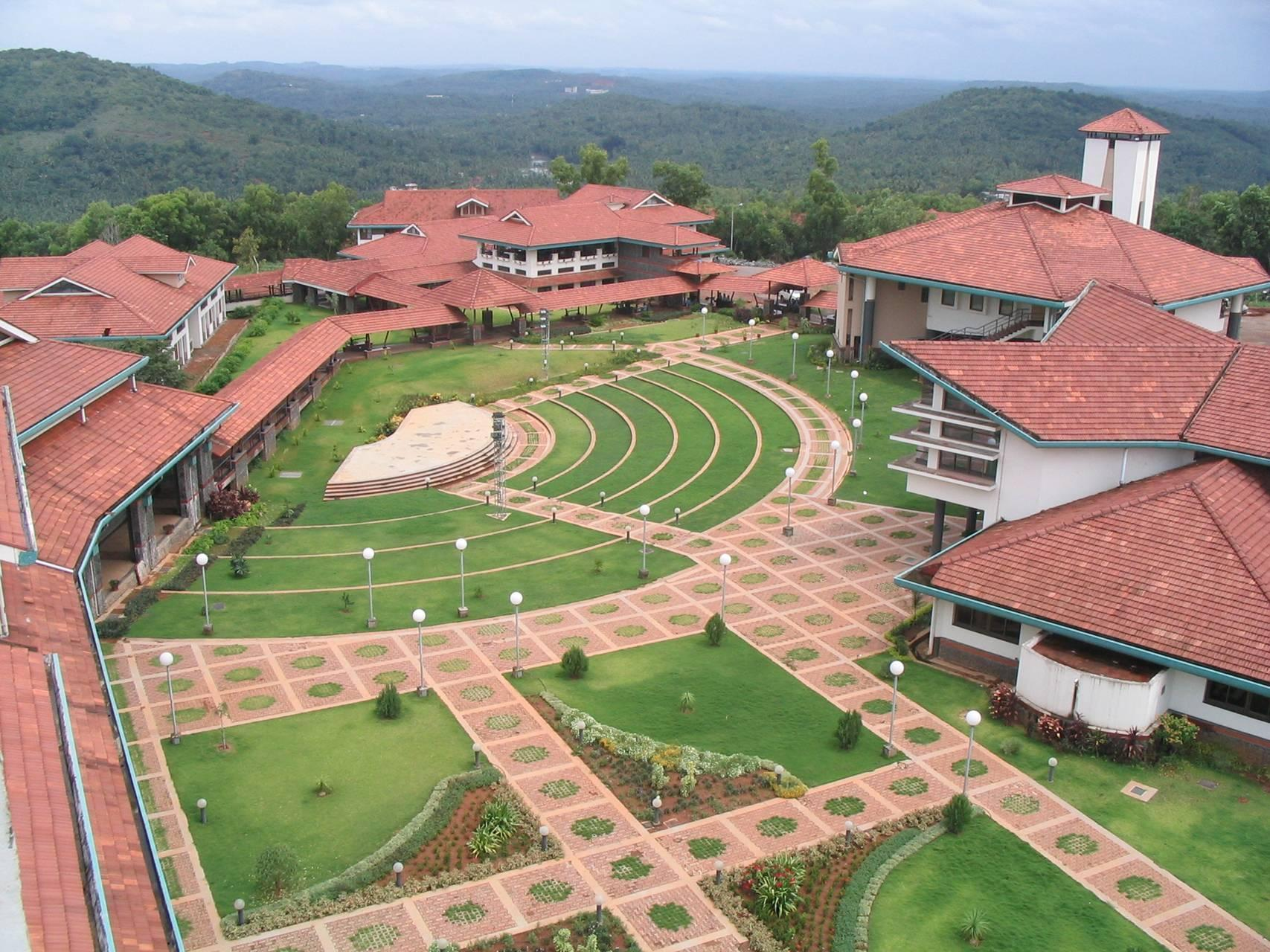
Aerial view of IIM Kozhikode campus

The main campus is located in Kunnamangalam, a sub-urban area of Kozhikode, Kerala. Kozhikode is the second-largest city in Kerala. The campus is located around 10 km (6.2 mi) from the NIT Calicut campus. The campus is spread across two hills which are part of the Western Ghats. Besides classrooms, the campus also has residential facilities for students, faculty and visitors. The campus houses 17 hostels to house around 900 students who are required to stay on campus. Set up over 111 acres of land, the campus relies on rain water harvesting as its primary source of water. A couple of new Hostels - Hostel P and Hostel Q have come up and have been operational from the academic year 2018, Hostel N is operational from 2019.

=== Library and Information Center ===
IIM Kozhikode hosts a fully automated Library & Information Center (LIC) which is one of the Centers of Development of Digital Libraries in the world. The institute coordinated the South Asia Support Network for Greenstone Digital Library Software at the request of UNESCO and suggested the idea of IIM Library Consortium Movement. The library provides services as an institutional archive. A balanced programme on the development of the collection of hard copy, audio/video, CD-ROM, and other electronic forms of documents is being followed.

=== Indian Business Museum ===
IIM Kozhikode embarked on a programme to create a Museum of Indian Business History in 2010 which is believed to be the first of its kind. The museum would feature the contributions of India's business leaders, the history of trade, commerce, business and industries in India. The first phase was completed with a budget of Rs. 1.5 crore. The museum spanning 23000 sq. ft. features a large model of the Uru, an ancient ship which was used for trade and commerce between Indian and the rest of the world, and pavilions by Indian companies like Tata, Godrej, Reliance, State Bank of India and Infosys. The Reserve Bank of India gallery of the museum was inaugurated in 2012 by D. Subbarao, the then governor of Reserve Bank of India.

=== Kochi Campus ===
IIM Kozhikode opened a satellite campus in Kochi in June 2012 to enhance the institute's offerings in Executive Education, especially full-time and part-time programmes targeted at middle and senior level executives. The campus is based in Athulya Complex at InfoPark in Kochi.

The campus as of 2026 offers a two-year executive management programme, which is accredited by Association of MBAs (AMBA), in addition to short and long-term management development programmes. The first batch of the two-year executive management programme commenced in April 2013. IIM Kozhikode's Kochi campus conducted a pre-union budget panel discussion on 'Second Generation Reforms' at the campus in Infopark on 20 February 2015. The event was live streamed.

In November 2026, the Kerala government approved a 90-year lease of 14.06 acres of land at Infopark Phase II in Kochi for IIM Kozhikode to develop a permanent campus.

=== Laboratory for Innovation, Venturing and Entrepreneurship (LIVE) ===
Laboratory for Innovation Venturing and Entrepreneurship (LIVE or IIMK LIVE) is a business incubator and entrepreneurship development centre of the institute. The centre was set up in June 2016 with the support of Department of Science and Technology, Government of India and acts as the on-campus technology business incubator under NSTEDB of the Indian government. It aims at contributing to the country's economic goals through innovation-led entrepreneurship.

The centre located in IIM Kozhikode Campus is involved in promoting and supporting innovation-led entrepreneurship in India. It runs an incubation program for early stage startups called Business Incubation Program since 2017. The first cohort of 12 startups was inducted in June 2017. The Incubation program is open to the student community and alumni of the institute. It also invites interest from startups from greater community who are not part of the institute's programs. The centre and the program benefits from the faculty experts, institute alumni and partner organisations. Apart from co-working facility, mentoring, investor network, training and workshops, it provides seed funding under various schemes of Department of Science and Technology and Ministry of Micro, Small and Medium Enterprises. It also partnered with MRPL, HPCL and public and private corporates to provide seed support assistance under Start-up India program. LIVE has created a vibrant startup ecosystem by establishing linkages with the other incubators such as NDBI of NID, Mobile10X of IAMAI, Kerala Start-up Mission, other leading technology and management institutes, angel networks and VC firms, technology platforms and other professional services providers.

== Academics ==
=== Academic programmes ===
IIM Kozhikode, like all IIMs, is an autonomous institution under Ministry of Human Resources Development, Government of India. The institute is free to design its own curriculum and recruit faculty members. In April 2011, Union Minister Kapil Sibal announced that the government is mulling enhancement of the autonomy of IIMs by allowing them to select the director and the chairman of Board of Directors. The PGP (Postgraduate Programme) and the ePGP (Executive Postgraduate Programme) courses have been granted international accreditation by the Association of MBAs (AMBA). IIM Kozhikode charges tuition fees of approximately INR 20.5 Lakhs for the two-year flagship PGP, PGP Finance and PGP-LSM programmes. Merit scholarships are awarded by the institute to students on the basis of their grades during one academic year. Scholarships are also offered by trusts like Sir Ratan Tata Trust, HCIL, O.P Jindal Group etc.

==== Post Graduate Programme (PGP) ====
The two-year MBA is the flagship education program which aims to prepare young graduates for senior-level positions in the industry. Like all IIMs, IIM Kozhikode also awards degrees.

IIM Kozhikode was ranked 54th globally in the 2026 Financial Times Masters in Management rankings, an improvement of 15 positions from its 69th-place ranking in 2025.

==== Post Graduate Programme in Finance (PGP-Finance) ====
PGP-Finance is a two-year full-time masters level program in domains such as corporate finance, investment banking, and wealth management.

==== Doctoral Programme in Management (PhD) (former Fellow Programme in Management) ====
The PhD in management program is a full-time, residential program in the field of management. Students spend the first two years doing coursework that provides fundamental knowledge in the field of management. Upon completion of their coursework, students take a comprehensive exam and pass on to candidacy where they work on their dissertation. The program is selective, admitting 10-15 students per year.

==== Executive Post-graduate Programme (Executive MBA) ====
Executive Post-graduate Programme offers a two-year ExecutiveMBA and one year post-graduate certification programmes in General Management, Operations, Marketing, Finance, Strategy, IT and Human Resources. These programmes are aimed at working professionals with a minimum three years of experience. EPGP MBA program have a mix of students from different backgrounds with varied experience levels.

The EPGP program is accredited by the AMBA (Association of MBAs) since 2011. The record-breaking induction ceremony of 13th batch of Executive Post Graduate Programme (EPGP 13) of the Indian Institute of Management, Kozhikode, was organised online.

==== Post Graduate Programme in Business Leadership (PGP-BL) ====
The full time one-year Post-Graduate Programme in Business Leadership is a management programme aimed at shaping young graduates with relevant work experience into potential business leaders.

Indian Institute of Management Kozhikode (IIMK) offers wide range of academic programmes in the field of management education.

==== PhD in Management (Practice Track) ====
The PhD in Management (Practice Track) of the Indian Institute of Management Kozhikode (IIMK) commenced from the academic year 2019-20. IIM Kozhikode considers management practice as a dominant source of knowledge creation in management science. Consequently, the IIMs see the PhD Programmes as a crucial source of management researchers and faculty resources of top quality both to the academic institutions including IIMs and to the industry, business, government and society.

==== Master of Business Administration - Kochi Campus ====
The Executive Post Graduate Programme (EPGP) is a two-year, face-to-face Master of Business Administration (MBA) program offered by the Indian Institute of Management Kozhikode (IIMK) at its Kochi Campus since 2013. The EPGP curriculum is focused on general management and consists of four quarters of instruction in each year, totaling approximately 380 hours in the first year and 360 hours in the second year. The first year includes compulsory foundational courses, while the second year comprises elective courses, a Business Plan Proposal Project, and a Capstone Simulation. Participants also attend immersion modules at the main IIMK campus, typically lasting one week each year.

Upon successful completion of the program, participants are awarded the Post-Graduate Degree of 'Master of Business Administration' (MBA), which is globally recognized by the Association of MBAs (AMBA), UK, as equivalent to an Executive MBA.

The Indian Institute of Management Kozhikode (IIMK) at its Campus since 2018 offers 1-yr blended Senior Management Program and 1-year blended EPBM, designed for working professionals. Delivered via Interactive Learning (IL), including in-person campus immersions, focusing on strategy, management, and leadership.

=== Faculty ===
The institute employs 93 full-time faculty members in economics, finance and accounting, managerial communication, general management, organizational behaviour and human resources, quantitative methods and operations management, information technology and systems and strategic management departments. Professor Debashis Chatterjee is the current director of IIM Kozhikode.

=== Social development initiatives ===
IIM Kozhikode incubated and mentors CREST (formerly Centre of Excellence - IIMK), an autonomous organization under the Government of Kerala, where youth from the marginalized sections of society are imparted training to make them intellectually and emotionally capable of joining reputed companies and educational institutions. The CREST functions as the Kerala Chapter of the Indian Council of Social Science Research (ICSSR).

IIM Kozhikode, through its Social Service Group, provides academic and project expertise to the 'Promoting Regional Schools to International Standards through Multiple Intervention' (PRISM) project, an initiative to improve the infrastructure and overall environment of government schools in Kerala. The project aims at academic development and infrastructure upgrade of Government Schools and is supported by several private stakeholders.

=== International exchange ===
IIM Kozhikode offers student exchange programmes with European Business School, Germany; Copenhagen Business School, ESCP-EAP Paris; Bocconi University, Jonkoping International Business School, Leipzig Graduate School of Management, Leeds University Business School, University of Queensland, BEM - Bordeaux Management School, Cyprus International Institute of Management (renamed to University of Limassol), Euromed Management, IESEG School of Management, Rouen Business School, Reims Management School, EDHEC Business School (Ecole des Hautes Etudes Commerciales du Nord), ESSCA Angers and Norwegian School of Economics & Business Administration.

=== Admission ===
The institute's current full-time student body consists of 900 graduate students and 79 doctoral students. The admissions to PGP course is based on the Common Admission Test (CAT) conducted by the IIMs for admission to graduate programs in management at 20 campuses. CAT is considered by test-takers as one of the most competitive exams in the world, with a success rate of about one in hundred. In 2015, around 2.1 lakh students enrolled for CAT to get admission to the IIMs.

49.5% seats in IIM Kozhikode are caste-based reserved quotas according to affirmative action policy of Government of India. 15% of the admitted students must be of the Scheduled Castes, and 7.5% of seats are reserved for Scheduled Tribes. The Other Backward Classes belonging to the "non-creamy layer" have been provided with 27% reservation since 2008 with the consent of the Supreme Court of India. 3% seats are reserved for Persons with Disability (PWD or DA). The reserved category students are admitted based on the CAT score using relaxed admissions criteria.

The institute also uses group discussions, essays and personal interviews to evaluate the students shortlisted based on CAT scores. In 2013, for shortlisting candidates for group discussion/essay/personal interview, IIMK used an index computed with 50 percent weight for the CAT-2012 score, 15 percent weight for academic performance in secondary school, 15 percent weight for academic performance in higher secondary school, 15 percent weight for academic performance in undergraduate level and 5 percent weight for being a female (to ensure gender diversity). For PhD admissions (earlier called as FPM), candidates with CAT, GMAT or GATE scores are eligible. In 2013, the PGP course of IIM Kozhikode had 54 percent girls, up from 28 percent in the previous academic year.

=== Rankings ===
Institute rankings

Business/Management – India
- NIRF (2024): 3

IIM Kozhikode (IIMK) was ranked 3rd with a score of 77.90 among management schools in India according to the National Institutional Ranking Framework (NIRF) in 2024 and ranked 4th among IIMs and 5th with a score of 74.74 among management schools in India by the National Institutional Ranking Framework (NIRF) in 2022. IIMK was ranked fourth among IIMs and fourth among management schools in India by the National Institutional Ranking Framework (NIRF) in 2021, seventh by The Week and Business Today's "India's best B-schools 2019" and fifth in India by Outlook India's "Top Public MBA Institutions" of 2020.

The Quacquarelli Symonds ranked IIMK 151-200 in the world and 23rd in Asia in the QS World University Rankings Global MBA Rankings 2025.

== Research ==
Research projects are funded either through IIMK's 'Small Grant Research Project' scheme, by external sources such as the Ministry of Human Resources Development, Government of India, Government of Kerala or through collaborations with foreign universities/research institutes. Fifteen externally sponsored research projects and 40 small grant research projects including the development of cases have been completed during 1997–2007. During the academic year 2020–2021, more than 100 journal articles, five book chapters, five edited books, four books, 15 working papers and three case studies were published.

== Student life ==
The students of PGP, PGP-BL and FPM programmes are required to reside on campus. Residential facilities in the campus include 13 student hostels and faculty guest houses. Roobaroo is a cultural event conducted every year during the induction of the new batch to acclimate students with IIMK culture and to build a good on-campus community.

The apex student body of the campus is the Students' Council (popularly known as 'S-Con') which is an elected committee of six students each from the first and second-year batches of PGP and PGPBL course. The Students' Council facilitates elections to the other student committees in campus. In addition to elections, the Students' Council is involved in elective bidding, hostel bidding, co-ordinating other student bodies (IGs, clubs and committees), conducting Farewell, liaison with administration and institutional development activities.

Backwaters, the annual management fest; Echoes, the annual intercollegiate cultural event; E-Summit, the annual entrepreneur meet; and Horizons, the annual management conclave, are a few major events organized by the student body.

Bhooklagi is a student-based start-up operating inside the campus that was started in 2013 and has been running successfully for 11 years.

The annual on-campus alumni meet-up, Nostalgia, has been conducted since 2004. Sangram is an annual sports meet with IIM Bangalore, IIM Trichy, and IIM Visakhapatnam with each institute hosting the event in alternate years. Sangam is the annual alumni meet of IIM Kozhikode and is organized in several cities in India and abroad. Alumni Association actively conducts alumni meetings across India as well as abroad. Recently three alumni have been added to the Board of Governors of IIM-Kozhikode. The Annual General Meeting of the Alumni Association is conducted during Nostalgia.

Kozhikode Marathon Executive Committee of IIM Kozhikode has organized mini-marathon runs in Kozhikode annually since 2010 to raise funds for social causes. In 2012 and 2013, the Calicut Mini Marathon was organized in association with Government of Kerala to promote the cause of women empowerment and solid waste management respectively.

Besides student committees, the institute also has student interest groups for various fields of management like marketing, finance, consulting and hobby clubs, photography, music, dance, theatre etc. The institute also offers placement guidance for students and organizes placement processes for the Summer Internship and outgoing batch.
