= Kunnamangalam =

Kunnamangalam Makkoottam
- Town
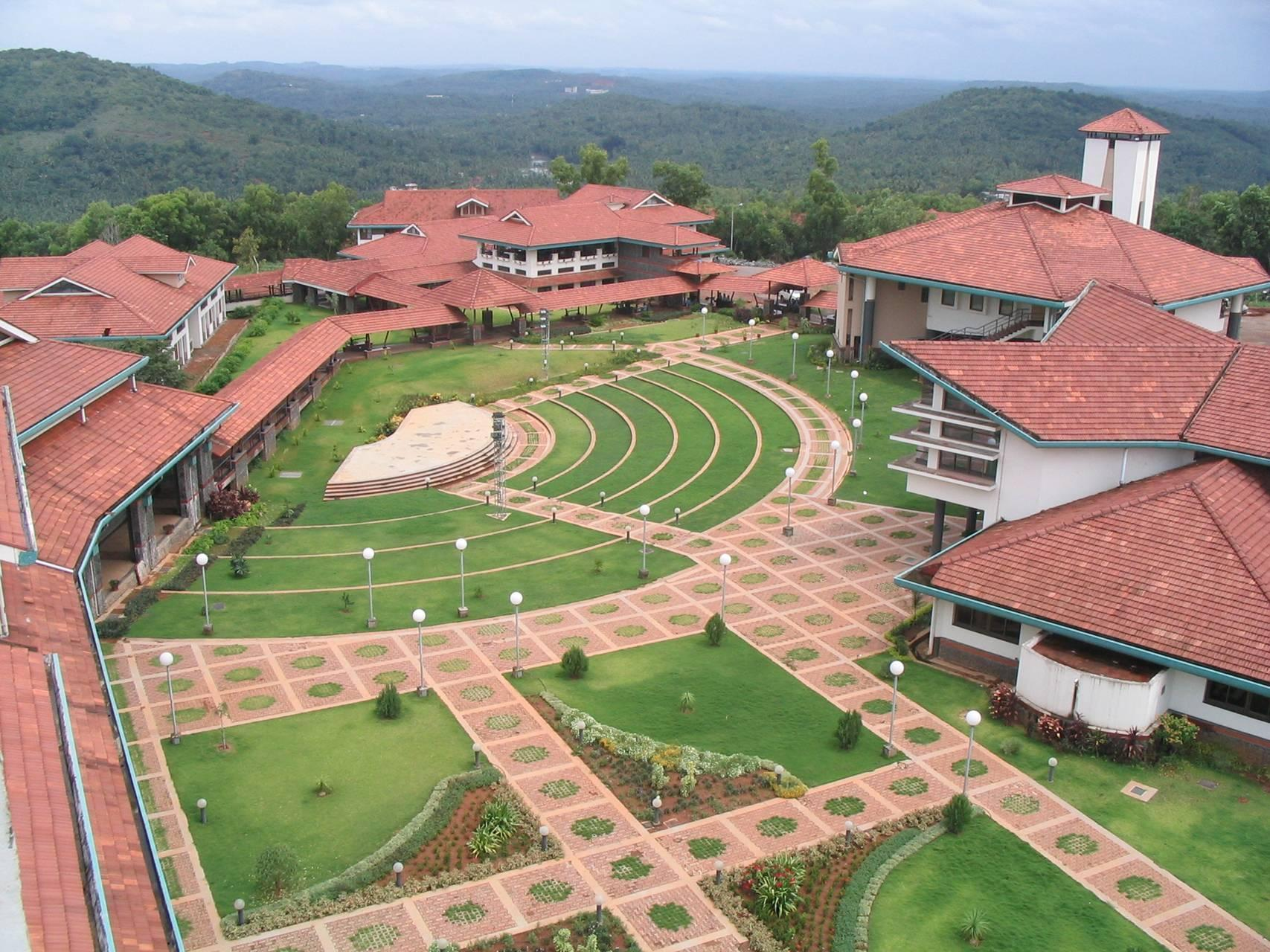
- Indian Institute of Management, Kozhikode (IIMK)
- Interactive map of Kunnamangalam
- Coordinates: 11°18′23″N 75°52′44″E
- Country: India
- State: Kerala
- Region: South Malabar
- District: Kozhikode

Government
  - Type: Panchayat
  - Body: Kunnamangalam Grama Panchayat

Area
  - Total: 27.23 km^{2} (10.51 sq mi)

Population (2011)
  - Total: 53,223
  - Density: 1,955/km^{2} (5,062/sq mi)

Languages
  - Official: Malayalam
- Time zone: UTC+5:30 (IST)
- PIN: 673571
- Nearest city: Kozhikode
- Lok Sabha constituency: Kozhikode
- Kerala Legislative Assembly constituency: Kunnamangalam (State Assembly constituency)

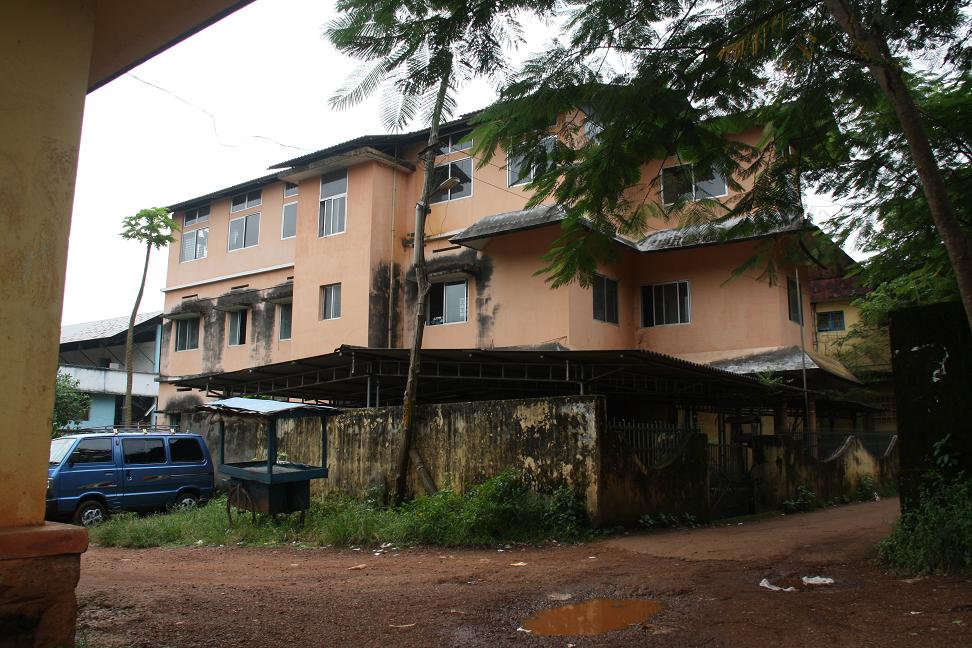
Panchayath office

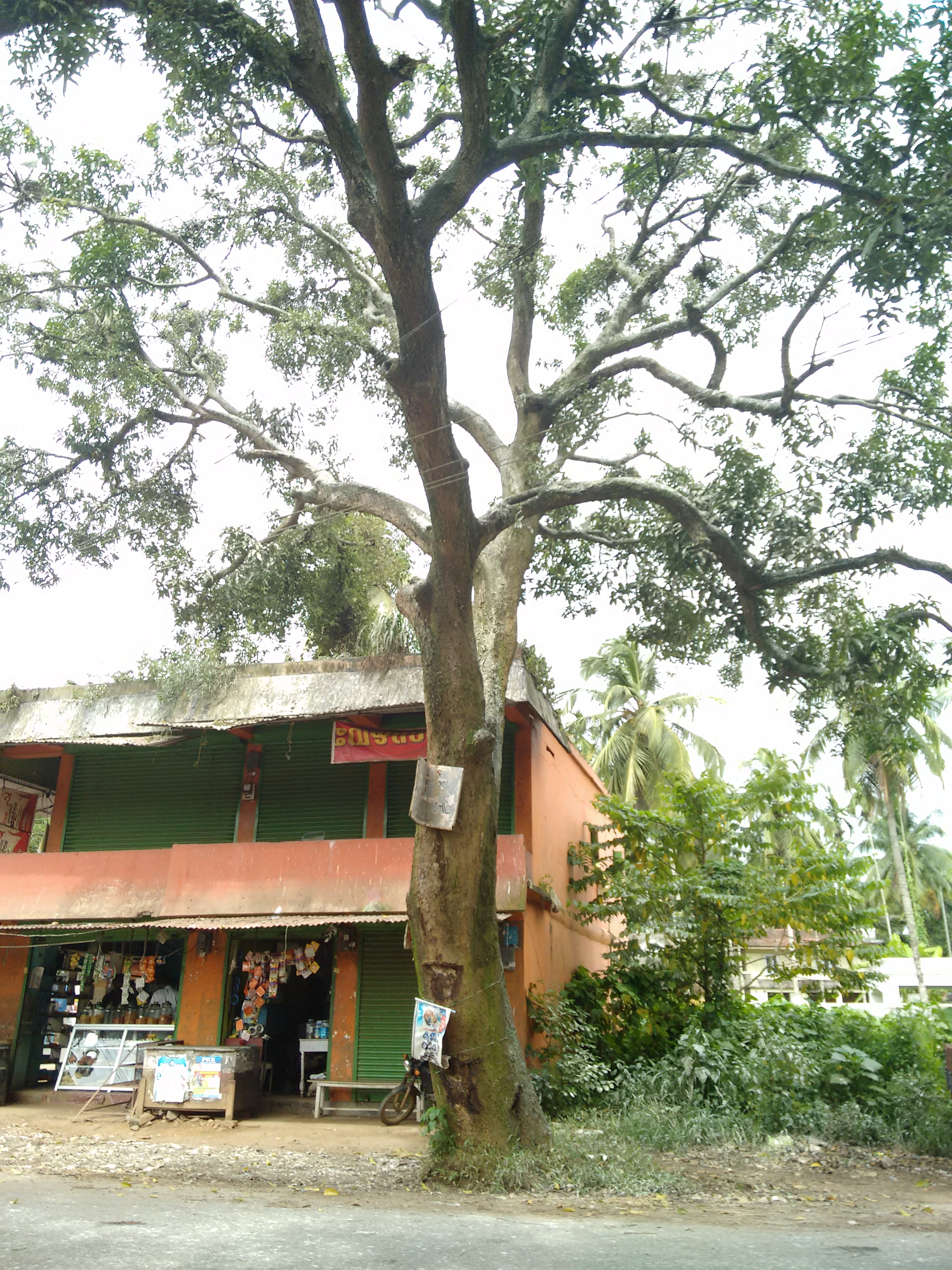

Kunnamangalam is a growing census town located about 14 km east of Kozhikode city on National highway 766. Nearby places are Koduvally, Mukkam, Chathamangalam, and Kattangal. India's premier educational institutions like Indian Institute of Management, Kozhikode (IIMK), National Institute of Technology Calicut, National Institute of Electronics & Information Technology, Indian Institute of Spices Research, and Kerala School of Mathematics, Kozhikode are located here. It is developing as a suburb in the east side entry of Kozhikode city.

== Demography ==
Kunnamangalam is the headquarters of Kunnamangalam Gramapanchayath. Hindus, Muslims and Christians are residing here intermixed with various temples, mosques and churches.

kunnamangalam panchayat population
Year	Pop.	±%
1971	21,756	—
1981	29,786	+36.9%
1991	38,208	+28.3%
2001	44,883	+17.5%
2011	53,223	+18.6%
Source: Census of India

== Nearest towns ==
- Kalpetta (50 km north)
- Karanthur (2 km east)
- Koduvally (7 km Northeast)
- Koyilandy (33 km North West)
- Kozhikode (15 km west)
- Moozhikkal (5 km west)
- Mukkam (14 km east)
- Narikkuni (9 km east)
- Thamarassery (15 km northeast)

== Conveyance ==
- Bus Transportation: Kunnamangalam is well connected to all major parts of Kerala. There are regular Kerala SRTC bus services and private bus services.
- Railway stations: Nearest stations are available at Kozhikode (17 kilometres), Feroke (27 kilometres) and Koyilandy (33 kilometres).
- Airports: Nearest airport is Calicut International Airport (35 kilometres)

== Major Organizations/ Educational Institutions ==
=== Indian Institute of Management, Kozhikode - IIMK. ===
Indian Institute of Management Kozhikode IIMK is one of the 20 Indian Institutes of Management set up by the Government of India. The Institute founded in 1996 in collaboration with the State Government of Kerala was the 5th IIM to be established.

=== National Institute of Technology, Calicut - NITC. ===
The National Institute of Technology Calicut (NITC), formerly the Calicut Regional Engineering College (CREC), is a centrally funded technical university and an institute of national importance governed by an act passed by the Parliament of India. The campus is situated at Chathamangalam, 22 kilometres (14 mi) north east of Kozhikode, on the Kozhikode–Mukkam Road. It was established in 1961. It is one of the National Institutes of Technology established by the Government of India for imparting high standard technical education to students from all over the country. The college is among the very few institutions in the country to host a Supercomputer of its own.

=== National Institute of Electronics and Information Technology - NIELIT. ===
NIELIT is an autonomous body of the Department of Electronics and Information Technology under the Ministry of Communication and Information Technology, Government of India.

The centre (erstwhile Centre for Electronics Design and Technology-CEDT) was established in the year 1989. Since then the centre is engaged in various formal and non formal courses. The centre is also engaged in research and development as well as product development and industrial consultancy services.

=== Centre for Water Resources Development and Management - CWRDM. ===
The Centre for Water Resources Development and Management (CWRDM) was established as an autonomous research organisation by the Government of Kerala, under its Science and Technology Policy in February 1978. Two of the important personalities behind the establishment of this institute were Shri C Achutha Menon, former Chief Minister of Kerala and Dr. P K Gopalakrishnan, former Secretary to the Government of Kerala. The centre had a steady growth along with its other sister institutes under the umbrella of the State Committee on Science, Technology and Environment. The Centre originally established at Thiruvananthapuram was shifted to the present 35 ha-campus at Kozhikode in 1979. The main building at the headquarters, completed in 1988, has 7000 sq m plinth area. In addition to this, there are separate buildings to house the isotope hydrology lab, Water analysing laboratory (NABL Accredited), hostels for trainees and canteen. Today, around 50 families of the staff are residing in the quarters constructed in the campus.

=== KMCT Group of Institutions. ===
==== KMCT Medical College and Hospital. ====
KMCT Medical College is situated at Kallanthode, Manassery and Mampatta 25 km from Kozhikode city.

==== KMCT College of Engineering. ====
KMCT College of Engineering [previously National Institute Technology and Science (NITS)] is an ISO 9001:2000 certified self-financing college affiliated to the University of Calicut located in Manassery, Kozhikode, Kerala, India. Established in 2001, KMCT College of Engineering offers six UG courses (B.Tech. programmes) as well as three PG courses including MBA, MCA and M.Tech. programmes.

Other institutions under KMCT Group.

- KMCT Dental College and Hospital.
- KMCT Ayurveda Medical College and Hospital.
- KMCT School of Nursing.
- KMCT College of Allied Health Science.
- National College of Pharmacy.
- KMCT College of Arts and Science.
- KMCT College of Architecture.

==== Handicrafts training centre ====
The Markaz in Karanthur has started a handicrafts training centre for school children. Here, the kids are making umbrellas, chalk pieces, candles, and incense sticks. They also get training in glass painting, thread patterning, and designing.

== Geography ==
Kunnamangalam is located at approx. 15 km east of Calicut city.

== See also ==
- Thiruvambady
