= Narikkuni =

- Town
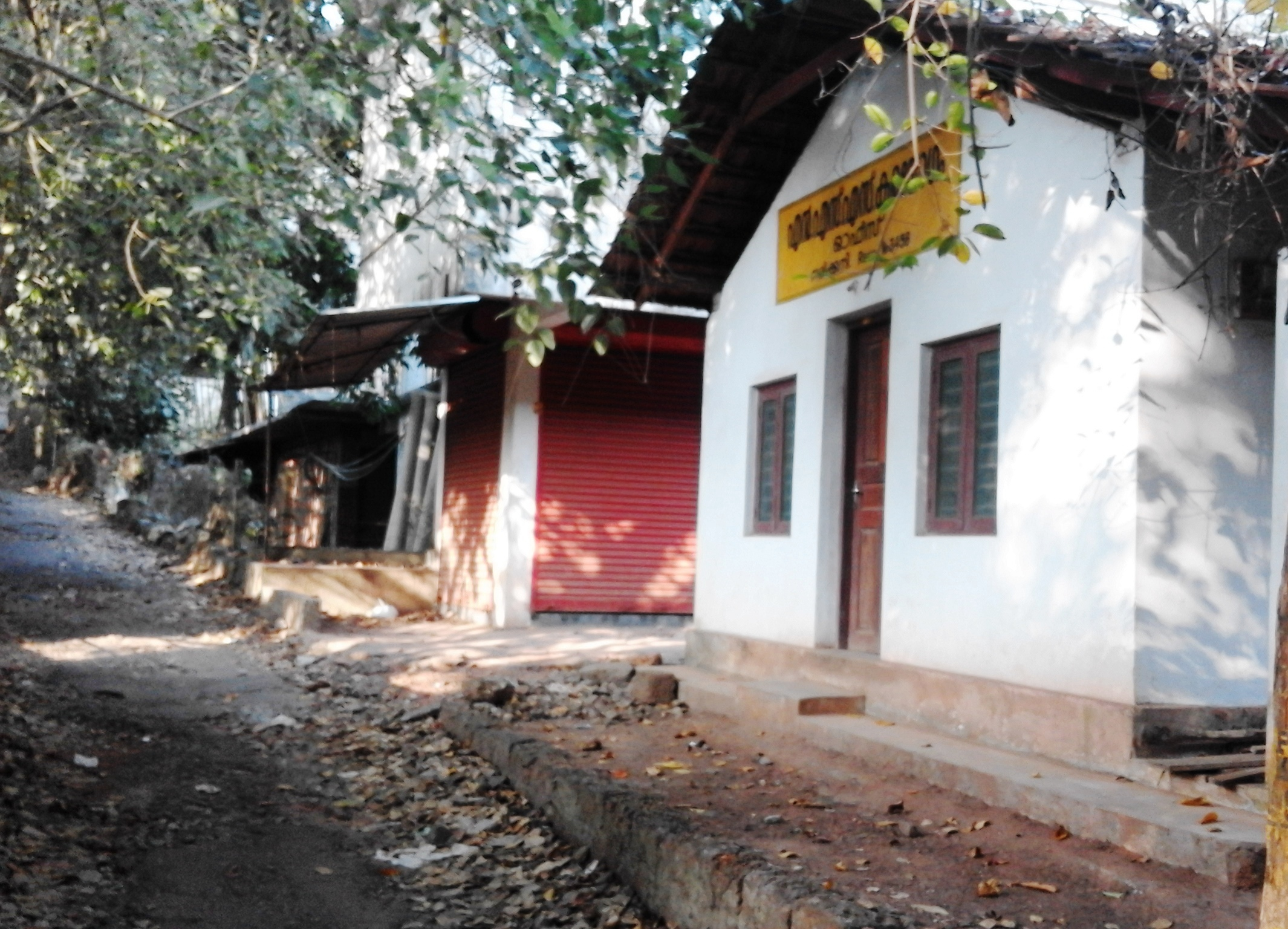
- Nair Service Society office at Narikkuni

- Location in Kerala, India Narikkuni (India)
- Coordinates: 11.3658°N 75.8636°E
- Country: India
- State: Kerala
- District: Kozhikode

Government
  - Type: Grama Panchayat

Area
  - Total: 17.85 km^{2} (6.89 sq mi)
- Elevation: 35 m (115 ft)

Population (2011)
  - Total: 24,290
  - Density: 1,361/km^{2} (3,524/sq mi)

Languages
  - Official: Malayalam, English
- Time zone: UTC+5:30 (IST)
- PIN: 673585
- Telephone code: 0495
- Vehicle registration: KL 76 Nanmanda RTO
- Nearest city: Kozhikode

Narikkuni ([n̪ʌɾɪkkʊnɪ]) is a town in Kozhikode district in the state of Kerala, India. According to Census 2011 information, the location code or village code of Narikkuni town is 627402. The town falls under the Kozhikode Tehsil and is situated 20 km from Kozhikode.

The total geographical area of the village is 1,785 hectares. Narikkuni has a total population of 24,290 and about 5,785 houses. Kozhikode is the nearest town to Narikkuni, which is approximately 20 km away.

== Location and connectivity ==
Narikkuni is located at a distance of about 20 km from Kozhikode, the district headquarters, and is well connected by road to the nearby towns. There are five main roads that span out from the Narikkuni town centre. Kozhikode is accessible by two routes, via the Narikkuni-Padanilam road (which spans 5.1 km and joins NH 766 at Padanilam) and the Kumaraswami Raja road. Narikkuni-Koduvally road is a 6.6 km stretch of road that connects Narikkuni to NH 766 at Koduvally. Poonoor is about 10 km away and can be reached by the Narikkuni-Poonoor road. The fifth road is the 8.3 km long Narikkuni-Nanminda road. The town has a bus stand-cum-shopping complex and acts as the origin to the bus services to all the main surrounding places.

=== Administration ===
Narikkuni village is administrated by Sarpanch (Panchayat President, or in other words, Head of the Village) who is the elected representative of the village. The panchayat Elections in 2020, saw the United Democratic Front winning 10 out of the 15 seats to secure a majority. Left Democratic Front emerged victorious in the remaining five seats. The Panchayat is currently headed by C.K. Saleem of UDF.

Grama Panchayat Representatives
Sl No.	Ward	Representative	Affiliation
1	Kundayi	Jawahar Poomangalam	UDF
2	Pannikkottoor	Jaseela Majeed	UDF
3	Moorkhan Kundu	Chandran K.K	LDF
4	Karukulangara	Lathika.K.K	LDF
5	Vattapparappoyil	Mini .V.P	LDF
6	Narikkuni	LaiLa C.P	UDF
7	Parannur	Zubaida Koodathankandy	UDF
8	Palolithazham	Salma Kumbalath	UDF
9	Kalkkudumbu	C.K.Saleem (President)	UDF
10	Chengottu Poyil	Sunil Kumar	UDF
11	Nellyerithazham	Mini Pullankandy (Vice President)	UDF
12	Odupara	Abdul Majeed T.P	LDF
13	Kavum Poyil	Moidy Neroth	UDf
14	Kalathil Para	T.Raju	LDF
15	Kodoli	Shareena K.K	UDF

== Suburbs and villages ==
- Barani para
- Poyilil
- Punnassery
- Parannur
- Vadekkandithazham
- Eravannur
- Palangad
- Vattapparapoyi

== Notable persons ==
- Chandran Veyattummal/ Paris Chandran
- Surabhi Lakshmi

== Image Gallery ==
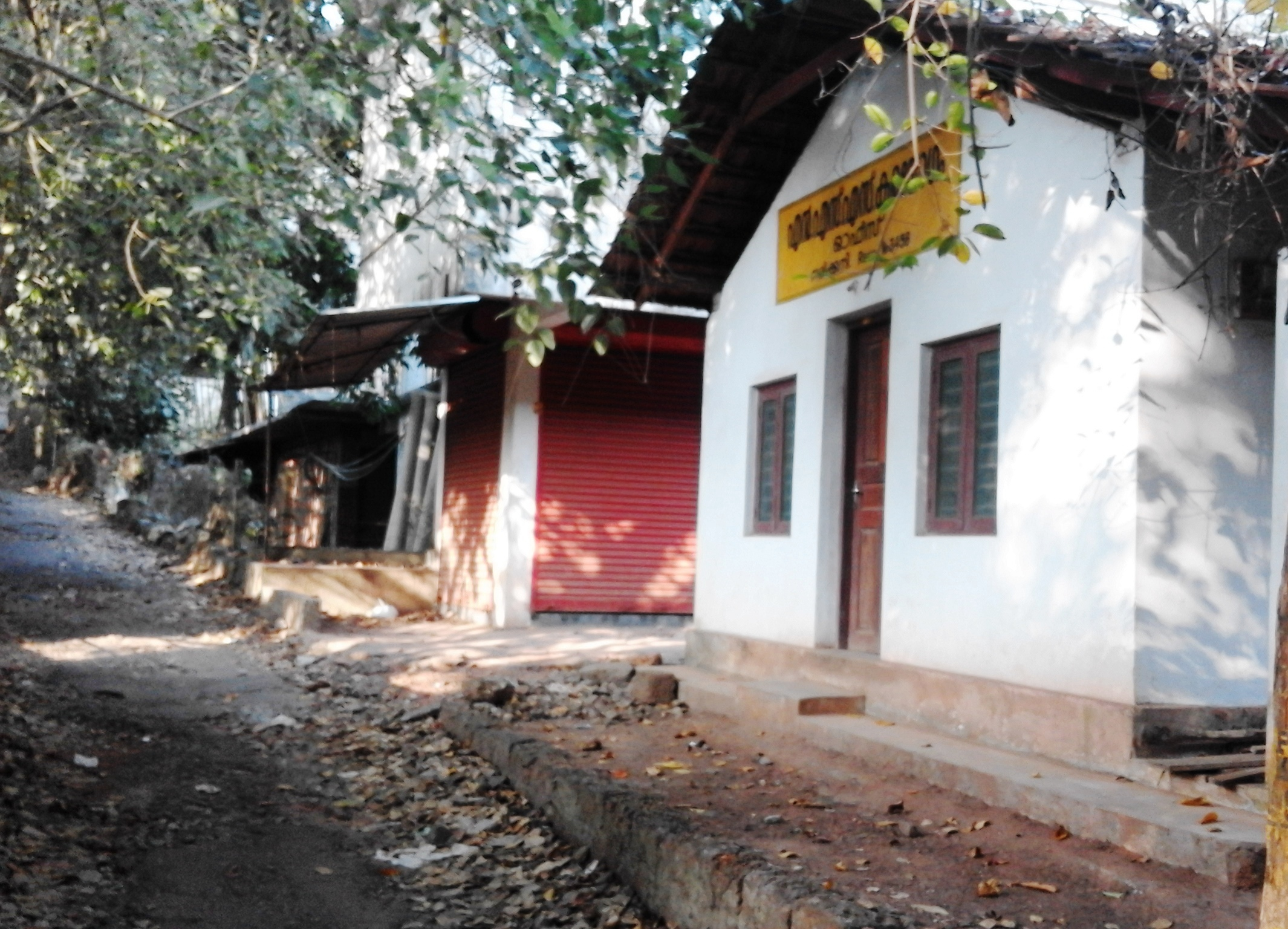
NSS Office

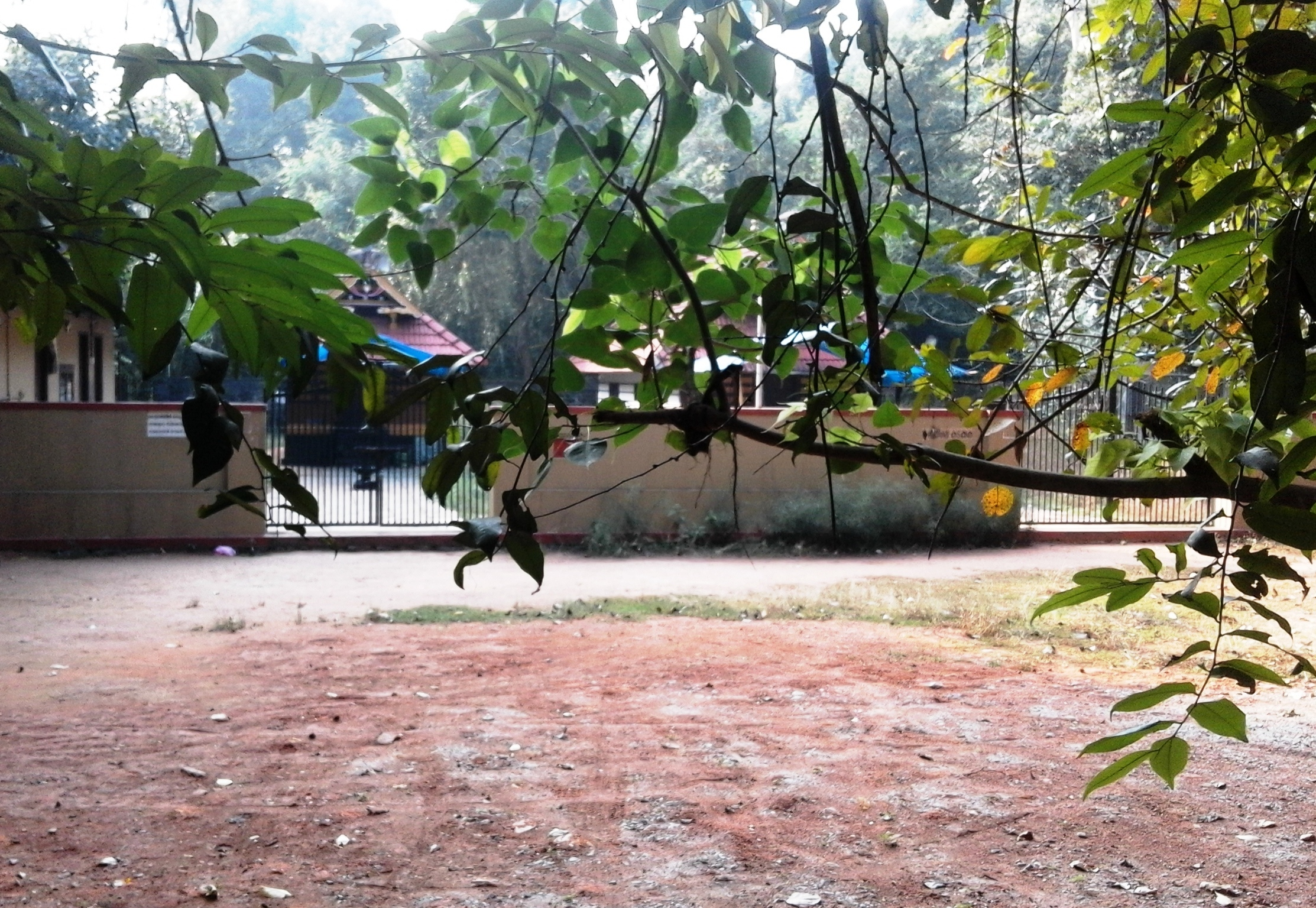
Narikkuni Fort

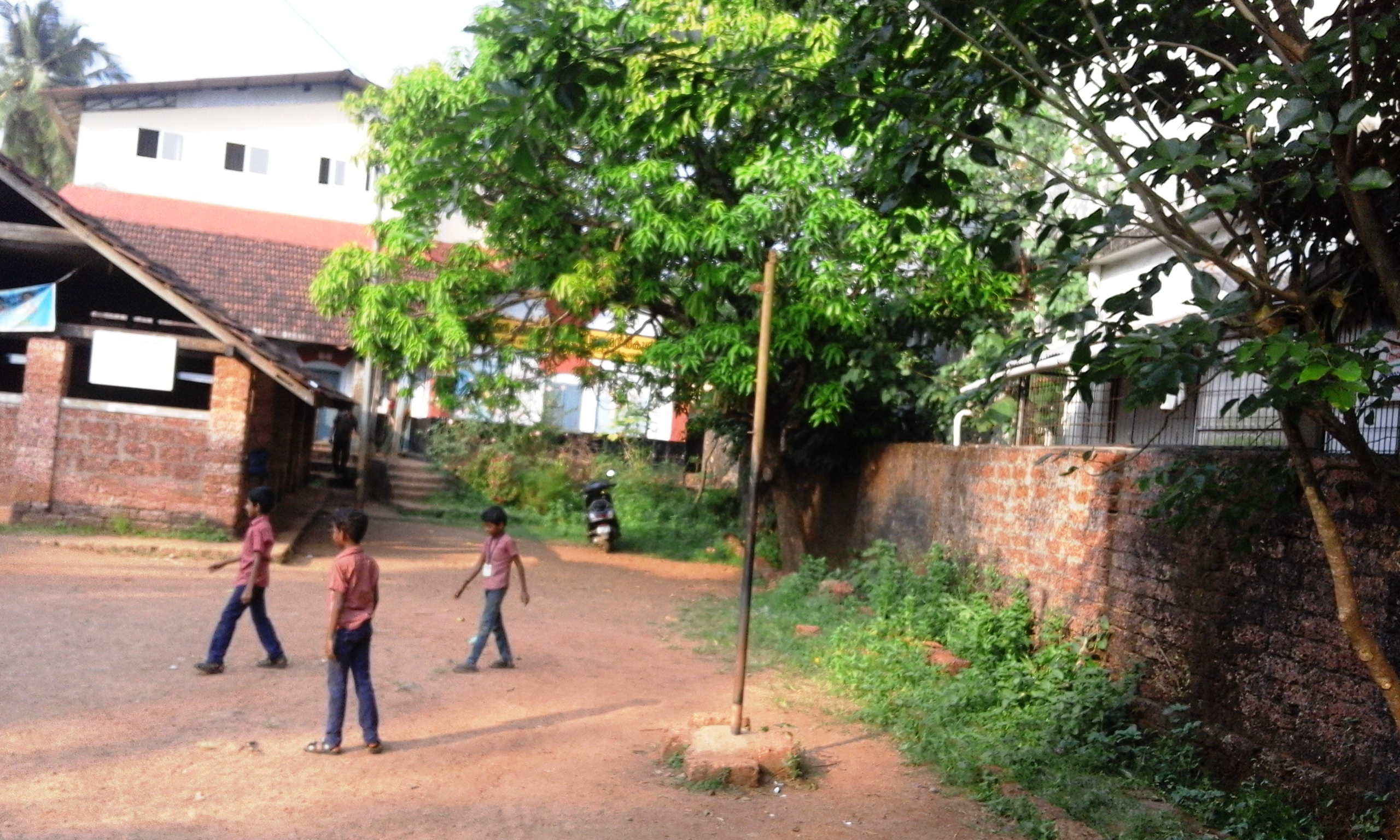
Narikkuni Upper Primary School

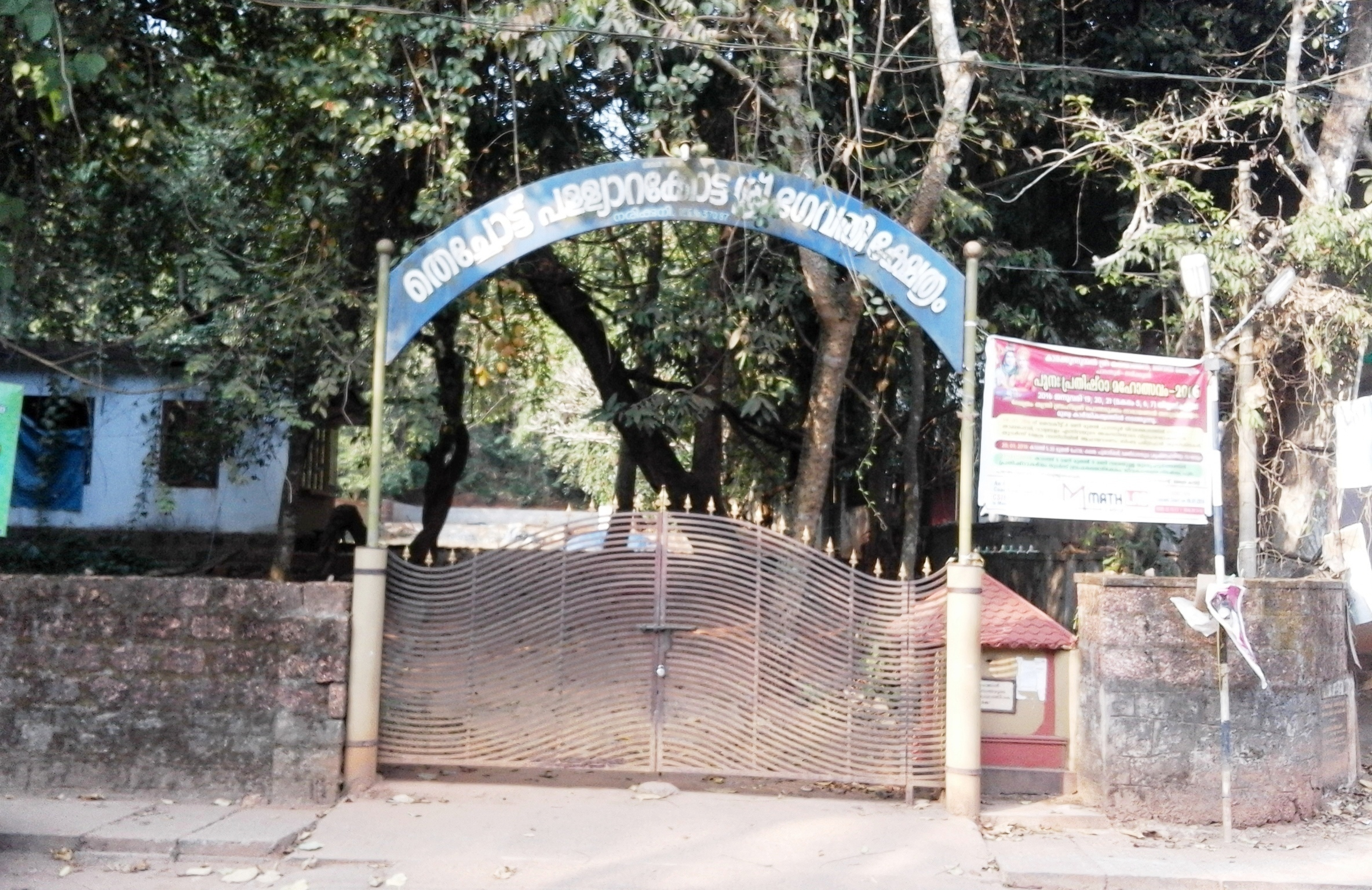
Narikkuni Fort
