= Thottumukkam =

Village in India

Coordinates: 11.2825203°N 76.056611516°E

Thottumukkam is a border village in the districts of Kozhikode and Malappuram Kerala, India, under the administration of Kodiyathur Gram Panchayat on the banks of Thottumukkampuzha, a major tributary of Chaliyar. It is bordered by Karassery of Kozhikode district and Urangattiri and Kizhuparamba gram panchayats of Malappuram district. Most of the people in the village are migrated farmers.

Thottumukkam, including Kodiyathur Grama Panchayat is part of Thiruvambady State Assembly Constituency of Wayanad Lok Sabha Constituency. Even though Thottumukkam is part of Kozhikode district, the area belongs to the Areacode (673639) sub-post office, Thottumukkam (0483) BSNL exchange, and Kizhuparamba KSEB section office of Malappuram district.

== Politics ==
Priyanka Gandhi of INC is the MP of Wayanad Loksabha Constituency.

C. K. Kasim of IUML is the current MLA of Thiruvambady Legislative Assembly Constituency.

A native of Thottumukkam, Com. George M. Thomas is ex. Thiruvambady MLA and a CPI(M) Kozhikode DC member.

Santhosh Sebastian is the member of Ward 5 (CPIM) and Suhas PK is the member of Ward 6.

== Transportation ==
Thottumukkam is connected to both Kozhikode and Malappuram district through roads. Regular bus services connecting Thottumukkam to Areekode town of Malappuram, Mukkam via Parathode and Thiruvambady via Koodaranhi are available.
