= Thiruvambady Assembly constituency =

Constituency of the Kerala legislative assembly in India

Thiruvambady
- Constituency No. 32 for the Kerala Legislative Assembly
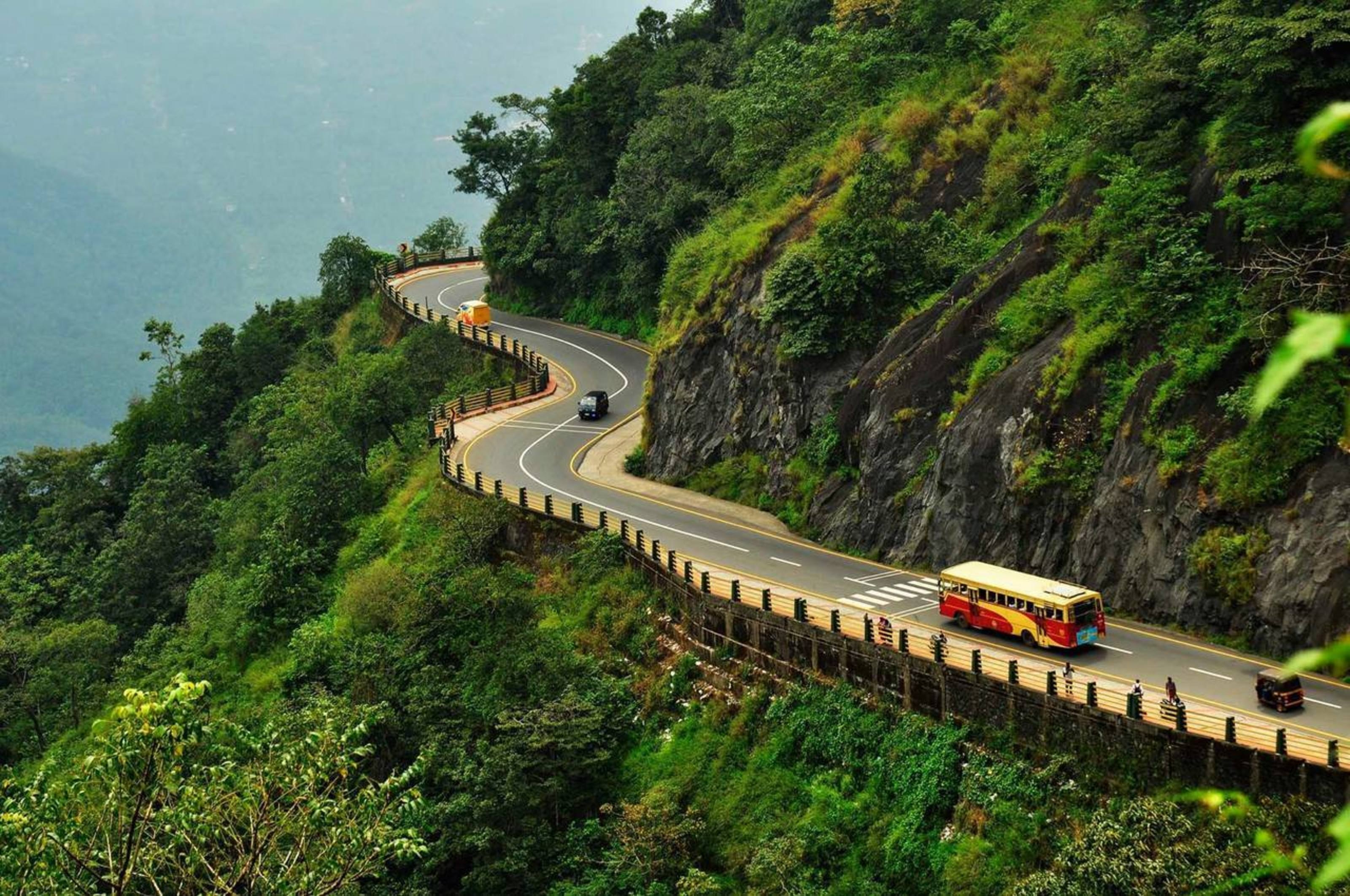
- Thamarassery Churam

Constituency details
- Country: India
- Region: South India
- State: Kerala
- District: Kozhikode
- Established: 1977
- Total electors: 1,80,289 (2021)
- Reservation: None

Member of Legislative Assembly
- 16th Kerala Legislative Assembly
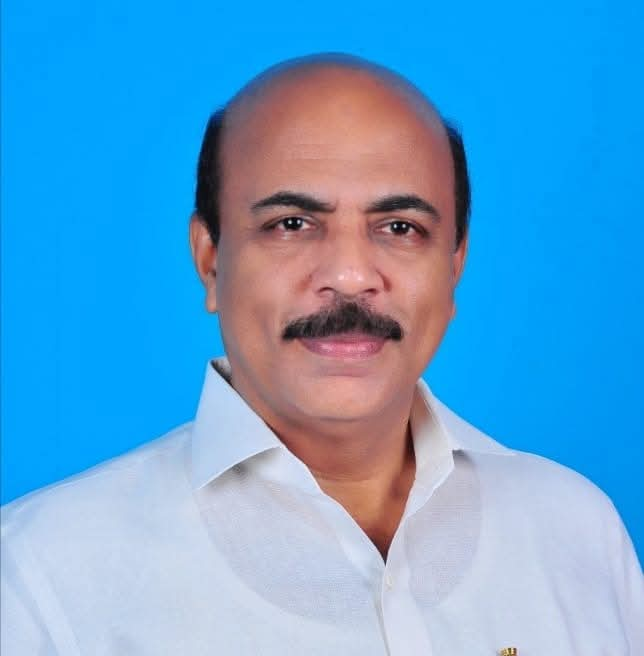
- Incumbent C. K. Kasim
- Party: IUML
- Alliance: UDF
- Elected year: 2026

Thiruvambady State assembly constituency is one of the 140 state legislative assembly constituencies in Kerala in southern India. It is also one of the seven state legislative assembly constituencies included in Wayanad Lok Sabha constituency. As of the 2026 Assembly elections, the current MLA is C. K. Kasim of UDF.

== Local self-governed segments ==
Thiruvambady Assembly constituency is composed of the following local self-governed segments:

Sl no.	Name	Status (Grama panchayat/Municipality)	Taluk
1	Thiruvambady	Grama panchayat	Thamarassery
2	Kodencheri	Grama panchayat	Thamarassery
3	Koodaranji	Grama panchayat	Thamarassery
4	Puthuppadi	Grama panchayat	Thamarassery
5	Karassery	Grama panchayat	Kozhikode
6	Kodiyathur	Grama panchayat	Kozhikode
7	Mukkam	Municipality	Kozhikode

== Members of Legislative Assembly ==
The following list contains all members of Kerala Legislative Assembly who have represented the constituency:

Year	Member	Political party
1977	P. Cyriac John	Indian National Congress
1980	P. Cyriac John	Indian National Congress (U)
1982	P. Cyriac John	Independent politician
1987	P. P. George	Indian National Congress
1991	A. V. Abdurahiman	Indian Union Muslim League
1996	A. V. Abdurahiman	Indian Union Muslim League
2001	C. Moyinkutty	Indian Union Muslim League
2006	Mathai Chacko	Communist Party of India (Marxist)
2006 (Note: By-Election)	George M. Thomas	Communist Party of India (Marxist)
2011	C. Moyinkutty	Indian Union Muslim League
2016	George M. Thomas	Communist Party of India (Marxist)
2021	Linto Joseph	Communist Party of India (Marxist)
2026	C. K. Kasim	Indian Union Muslim League

== Election results ==
Percentage change (±%) denotes the change in the number of votes from the immediate previous election.

=== 2026 ===
2026 Kerala Legislative Assembly election: Thiruvambady
Party	Candidate	Votes	%	±%
IUML	C. K. Kasim	77,140	49.23	▲5.02
CPI(M)	Linto Joseph	70,399	44.93	▼2.53
TTP	Sunny Thomas	7,380	4.71	New
AAP	Sunny V. Joseph	812	0.52	
NOTA	None of the above	458	0.29	▲0.12
Independent	Muhammed Kasim	186	0.12	
Independent	Dr. Wilson Rockey	164	0.1	
Independent	P. K. Kasim	141	0.09	
Margin of victory		6,741		
Turnout		1,56,680		
IUML gain from CPI(M)		Swing		

=== 2021 ===
There were 1,80,289 registered voters in the constituency for the 2021 election.

2021 Kerala Legislative Assembly election: Thiruvambadi
Party	Candidate	Votes	%	±%
CPI(M)	Linto Joseph	67,867	47.46	▲1.53
IUML	C. P Cheriya Muhammed	63,224	44.21	▲0.49
BJP	Baby Ambattu	7,794	5.45	−
Independent	Sunny V Joseph	1,847	1.29	−
Independent	K. P Cheriya Muhammed	1,121	0.78	−
Independent	Linto Joseph	579	0.4	−
NOTA	None of the above	419	0.17	▼0.29
Independent	Lenilal T. D	80	0.06	−
Independent	George Mathew Thottathimyalil	78	0.05	−
Margin of victory		4,643	3.25	▲1.04
Turnout		1,43,009	79.32	▼1.25
CPI(M) hold		Swing	▲1.53	

=== 2016 ===
There were 1,68,412 registered voters in the constituency for the 2016 election.

2016 Kerala Legislative Assembly election: Thiruvambady
Party	Candidate	Votes	%	±%
CPI(M)	George M. Thomas	62,324	45.93	▲0.53
IUML	V. M. Ummer	59,316	43.72	▼4.99
BDJS	Giri Pambanal	8,749	6.45	▲3.09
WPOI	Raju Punnakkal	2,226	1.64	−
NOTA	None of the above	776	0.57	−
Independent	Simon Thonakkara	641	0.47	−
SDPI	T. P. Mohammed	569	0.42	▼0.26
PDP	Noushad Kodiyathoor	517	0.38	−
Independent	Sibi Valayil	426	0.31	−
Independent	C. M. Ummer Chokliyil	77	0.06	−
Independent	Ummar Vilangot	65	0.05	−
Margin of victory		3,008	2.21	
Turnout		1,35,686	80.57	▲1.18
CPI(M) gain from IUML		Swing		

=== 2011 ===
There were 1,45,763 registered voters in the constituency for the 2011 election.

2011 Kerala Legislative Assembly election: Thiruvambady
Party	Candidate	Votes	%	±%
IUML	C. Moyinkutty	56,386	48.71	
CPI(M)	George M. Thomas	52,553	45.40	
BJP	Jose Kappattmala	3,894	3.36	
SDPI	C. T. Ashraf	790	0.68	
Independent	K. Moyinkutty	576	0.50	−
Independent	George Thomas	574	0.50	−
Independent	K. P. Basheer Haji	541	0.47	−
BSP	Gafoor Puthuppady	440	0.38	−
Margin of victory		3,883	3.35	
Turnout		1,15,754	79.41	
IUML gain from CPI(M)		Swing		

== See also ==
- Thiruvambady
- Kozhikode district
- List of constituencies of the Kerala Legislative Assembly
- 2016 Kerala Legislative Assembly election
