= Cherupuzha =

Cherupuzha may refer to:

- Cherupuzha (Kannur), Town in the state of Kerala, India
- Cherupuzha (Karulai), Kerala, a river
- Cherupuzha (Mavoor), Kerala, a river
- Cherupuzha (Areekode), Kerala, a river
