= Vettilappara =

- village
- Location in Kerala, India Vettilappara (India)
- Coordinates: 11°23′0″N 75°44′0″E
- Country: India
- State: Kerala
- District: Malappuram

Languages
  - Official: Malayalam, English
- Time zone: UTC+5:30 (IST)
- PIN: 673639
- Vehicle registration: KL-10, KL-84(new)
- Nearest city: Areacode
- Lok Sabha constituency: Wayanad
- Vidhan Sabha constituency: Eranadu

Vettilappara is a village in Malappuram district in the state of Kerala, India.

== Demographics ==
As of 2011 India census, Vettilappara had a population of 8696 with 4310 males and 4386 females.

- Village = Vettilappara
- Panchayath = Urangattiri
- Block Panchayath = Areekode
- District Panchayath = Malappuram

== Transportation ==
Vettiappara village connects to other parts of India through Feroke town on the west and Nilambur town on the east. National highway No. 66 passes through Pulikkal and the northern stretch connects to Goa and Mumbai. The southern stretch connects to Cochin and Trivandrum. State Highway No. 28 starts from Nilambur and connects to Ooty, Mysore and Bangalore through Highways 12, 29 and 181. The nearest airport is Kozhikode Airport. The nearest major railway station is at Feroke.

== Education ==
- Govt High School, Vettilappara
- Govt UP school, Odakkayam
- Holy Cross Convent School, Vettilappara

== Banks ==
- Canara Bank Vettilappara
- Vanitha Co-operative Bank Vettilappara

== Nearest places ==
- Areacode
- KINARADAPPAN*
- Nilabur
- Thottumukkam
- Kakkadampoyil
- Edavanna

== Tourist Attraction ==
- Urakkuzhippara Waterfalls
- Chekkunnu Mala
- CHOTHUKADAVE DAM*
- CHOTHUKADAVE BRIDGE*
- Kollam Kolli Waterfalls
- Odakkayam
- Ruby Estate

== River ==
- Vettilappara Puzha (Cherupuzha)

This river originates from the Odakkayam hills. Many streams form Chekkunnu hills and Alappara hills flow into it.

== Economy ==
Agriculture is the mainstay of economy. Major Crops are

- Coconuts
- Arecanut
- Black Pepper
- Rubber
- Nutmeg
- Plantain
- Clove
