= Urumi 1 Weir =

Dam in Kerala, India

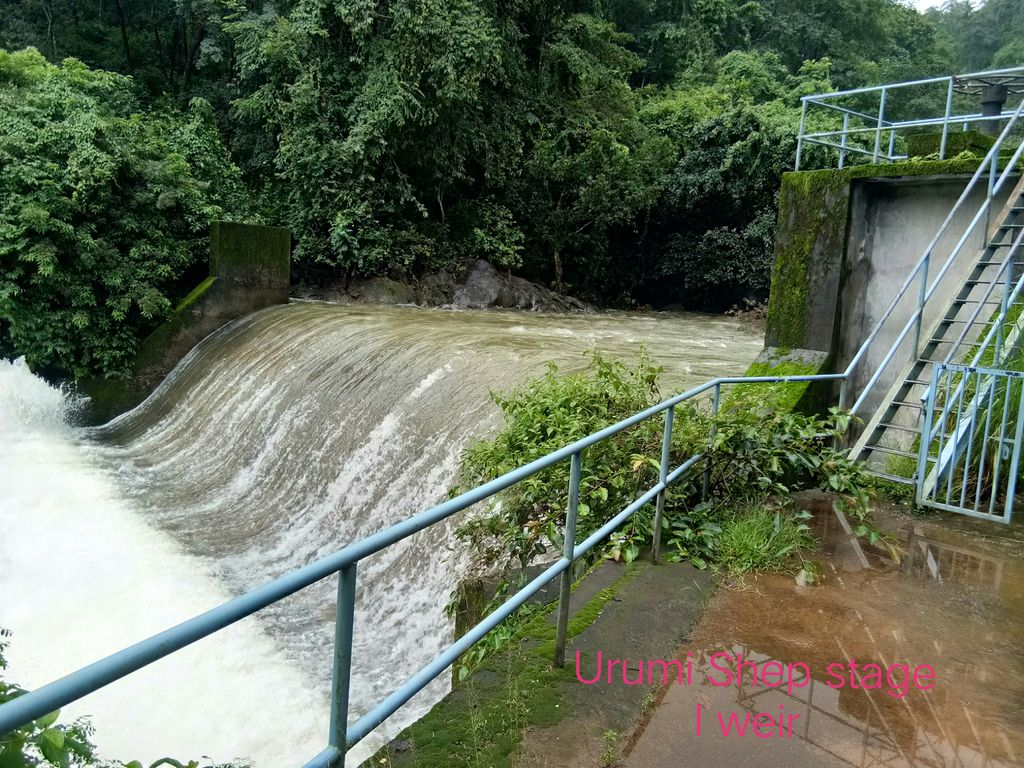
Urumi 1 Weir

Urumi 1 Weir is small diversion dam constructed across Poyilingalpuzha in Koodaranji village of Kozhikode district in Kerala, India. This weir is constructed for power generation in a Small Hydro Electric Project and is constructed across the Poylingalpuzha which is a tributary of Chaliyar river. Location is at Urumi near Poovaranthodu, Koodaranji village of Kozhikode district. Height from deepest foundation is 5.6 metres (18 ft) and the length is 47.0 metres (154.2 ft).

The Urumi falls near the dam has become a tourist attraction after the hydro electric project came into existence.
