= P. K. Basheer =

Indian politician

P.K. Basheer
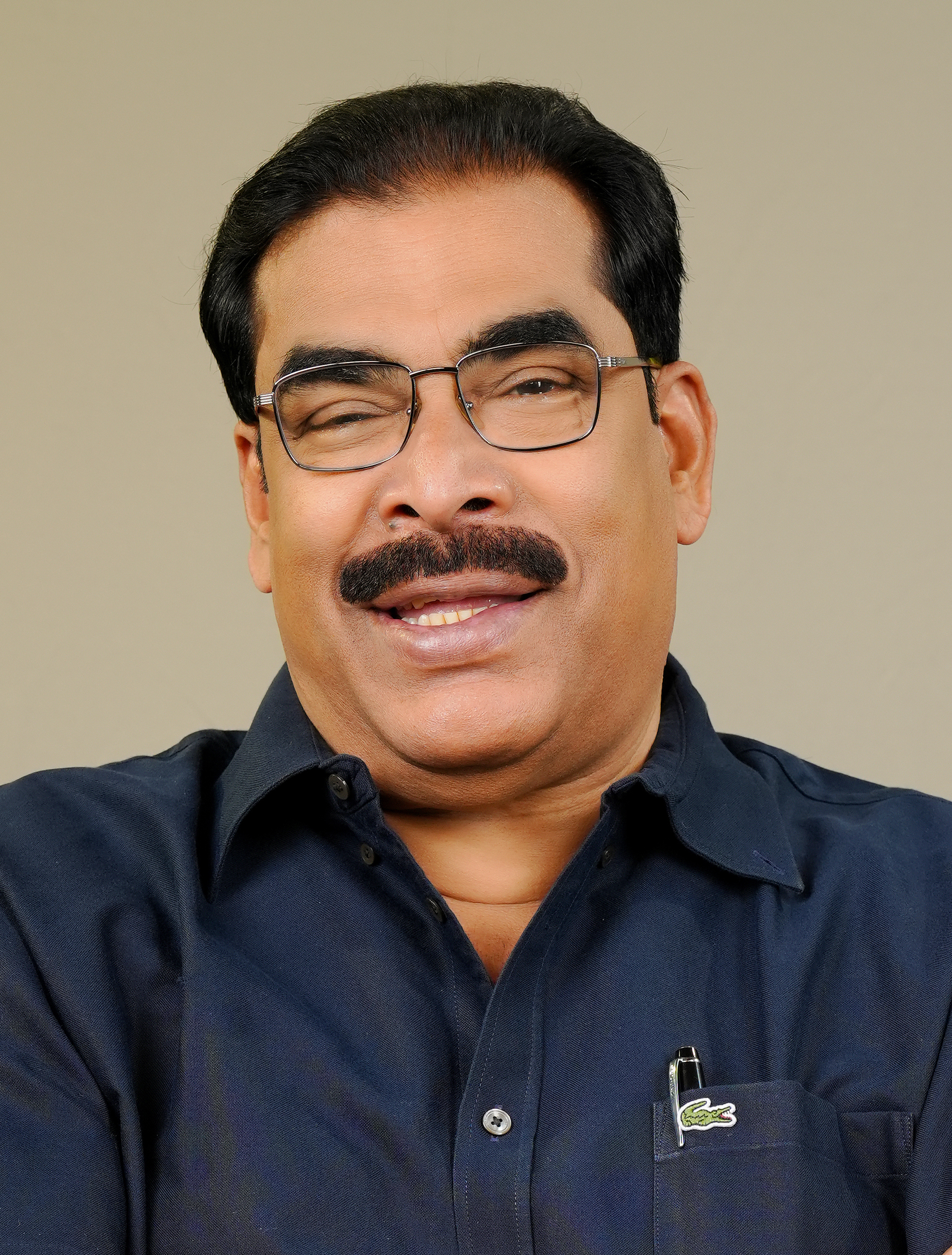

Minister for Public Works, Government of Kerala
- Incumbent
- Assumed office 18 May 2026
- Governor: Rajendra Arlekar
- Chief minister: V.D. Satheesan

Member of the Kerala Legislative Assembly
- Incumbent
- Assumed office 1 June 2011
- Constituency: Eranad

Personal details
- Born: 25 September 1959 (age 67) Edavanna
- Party: Indian Union Muslim League
- Spouse: Raziya Basheer
- Parent: P Seethi Haji (father)

P.K. Basheer (born 25 September 1959) is an Indian politician and philanthropist serving as the Minister for Public Works, Government of Kerala, since 2026, and as the member of 16th Kerala Legislative Assembly. He is a member of Indian Union Muslim League and represents Eranad constituency. He was elected as a Member of the Legislative Assembly from Eranad constituency continuously for 15 years since 2011. He increased the margin of his victory in each election. 11,246 in 2011, 12,893 in 2016 and 22,546 in 2021. In the latest elections as of 2026, he won again with a lead of 41,289 almost doubling his lead from the last elections.

== Early life ==
Basheer was born on 25 September 1959 at Edavanna in Malappuram district, the son of P. Seethi Haji, a former MLA, Chief Whip and prominent IUML leader, and Fathima Hajjumma. He entered politics in 1977 through the Muslim Students Federation (MSF), the party's student wing.

== Political career ==
Basheer became President of Edavanna Grama Panchayat in 1988 at the age of 28. He went on to hold several posts within the Muslim Youth League and IUML, including President of the Muslim Youth League's Wandoor constituency committee (1985–1990), District Vice-President of the Muslim Youth League, Malappuram (1991–1995), State Working Committee member of the Muslim Youth League (1996–2001), President of the IUML's Wandoor constituency committee (1990–1995), and President of the IUML's Ernad constituency committee (2008–2017). He served as a Member of the Malappuram District Panchayat (2000–2005), President of the Edavanna Service Co-operative Bank for 13 years, and Director of the Malappuram District Co-operative Bank. Since 2004 he has been a member of the State Working Committee of the IUML and currently sits on its State Secretariat.

== Minister for Public Works (2026–present) ==
Following the United Democratic Front's victory in the 2026 Kerala Legislative Assembly election, Basheer was inducted into the cabinet led by Chief Minister V. D. Satheesan and sworn in as Minister for Public Works, a portfolio of cabinet rank responsible for roads, bridges, buildings and related infrastructure across the state.His inclusion in the cabinet was seen as reflecting organisational strength, cadre sentiment and regional representation, given his grassroots influence and wide acceptability within the party.

== Mundakkai–Chooralmala rehabilitation project ==
Basheer has served as convenor of the IUML's rehabilitation sub-committee for survivors of the July 2024 Wayanad landslides at Mundakkai - Chooralmala in Wayanad, one of the deadliest natural disasters in Kerala's history. Under his leadership, the IUML independently mobilised over ₹37 crore through a dedicated crowdfunding mobile application, "For Wayanad", to purchase roughly 11–11.5 acres of land at Vellithode, near Thrikkaipatta in Meppadi panchayat, for ₹14.13 crore, and construct a 105-house rehabilitation township for displaced families, including 14 non-Muslim families in the first phase. Each house measures about 1,060 sq ft with three bedrooms on eight cents of land, and the project's architect, Tony Joseph of Stapati, designed it without charge. The first phase of 51 houses was formally handed over to beneficiaries in April 2026, with construction reportedly completed independent of the state government's parallel housing scheme at Elston Estate, Kalpetta, and a housewarming ceremony attended by IUML state president Panakkad Sayyid Sadiq Ali Shihab Thangal.

== Philanthropy ==
Basheer is a noted philanthropist. Out of concern for the poor, he established the Seethi Haji Cancer Detection Centre and the Seethi Haji Dialysis Centre, both at Edavanna and among the few facilities of their kind in Kerala. Both centres are run under the Seethi Haji Charitable Trust, of which he is chairman.

== Academic and educational activities ==
Basheer has played a significant role in advancing higher and secondary education across Kerala through institutional leadership and legislative initiatives. As a key figure in the management of several educational institutions, he has overseen the development and administration of arts and science colleges, higher secondary schools, and polytechnic institutes, including his leadership within the Eranad Muslim Educational Association (EMEA).

- Institutional leadership: Serves as the General Secretary of the Eranad Muslim Educational Association (EMEA) and sits on the managing committees overseeing EMEA College of Arts and Science, EMEA Higher Secondary School, and EMEA Higher Secondary School and Technical Institute in Kondotty.
- "Etam-Munnettam" infrastructure project: As Member of the Legislative Assembly (MLA) for the Eranad Assembly Constituency, he executed the Etam-Munnettam special project, a targeted developmental initiative that modernized and upgraded infrastructure across government and aided schools within his constituency.
- Orphanage and welfare education: Functions as General Secretary of the Edavanna Yatheemkhana, supporting residential, academic, and vocational training programs for underprivileged students.

=== International representation ===
Representing India, Basheer was part of the national delegation sent to the Commonwealth Parliamentary Association (CPA) conference held in the Bahamas, representing Indian legislative and educational governance frameworks on an international platform.

== Election results ==
Voting Results

- Votes Polled: 166,213
- Shri. P.K. Basheer (IUML): 96,974
- Adv.Shafeer Kizhisseri (CPI): 56,557
- Shri. N. Sreeprakash (BJP): 8,577

== Positions held ==
- President, Edavanna Service Co-operative Bank (13 Years)
- MYL, Edavanna Panchayat (1985)
- IUML, Wandoor Constituency (1990)
- Vice-President, District Committee MYL (1991)
- Member, MYL State Working Committee (1996)
- Director (1991–98); Malappuram District Service Co-operative Bank (1991–98)
- Member, Malappuram District Panchayat (2006)
- State Working Committee, IUML (since 2004)
- President, Edavanna Grama Panchayat (1988)
- President, IUML Wandoor committee (1990–1995)
- President, IUML Eranad constituency committee (2008–2017)
- General Secretary, Edavanna Yatheemkhana
- President, Manjeri PCC Marketing Society
- Managing Committee Member, Edavanna Jamia Nadwiyya Trust
- General Secretary, Ernad Muslim Educational Association
- Convenor, IUML Mundakkai–Chooralmala rehabilitation sub-committee

== Personal life ==
He was born at Edavanna on 25 September 1959. His parents are P Seethi Haji and Fathima Hajjumma. He is married to Raziya Basheer and has three children, Jihan Harid, Nahan Azhar, and Sajin Seethi.
