= Kuruvanpuzha =

Kuruvanpuzha is a tributary of Chaliyar river in Kerala, India. This river originates in the forests bordering Malappuram and Kozhikode districts in Nilambur taluk. It joins the Chaliyar near Vadapuram just before Kuthirappuzha meets Chaliyar, behind the Kerala State Wood Industries Limited. The Connolly's Plot, near the confluence of Kuruvanpuzha with Chaliyar, has the world's biggest and oldest teaks.
