= Eranad (disambiguation) =

Eranad is a former province in Kerala, India.

Eranad may also refer to:

- Eranad Taluk, Kerala, India
- Eranad Assembly constituency, a constituency in Kerala, India
