= Linto Joseph =

Indian politician

MLA Linto Joseph
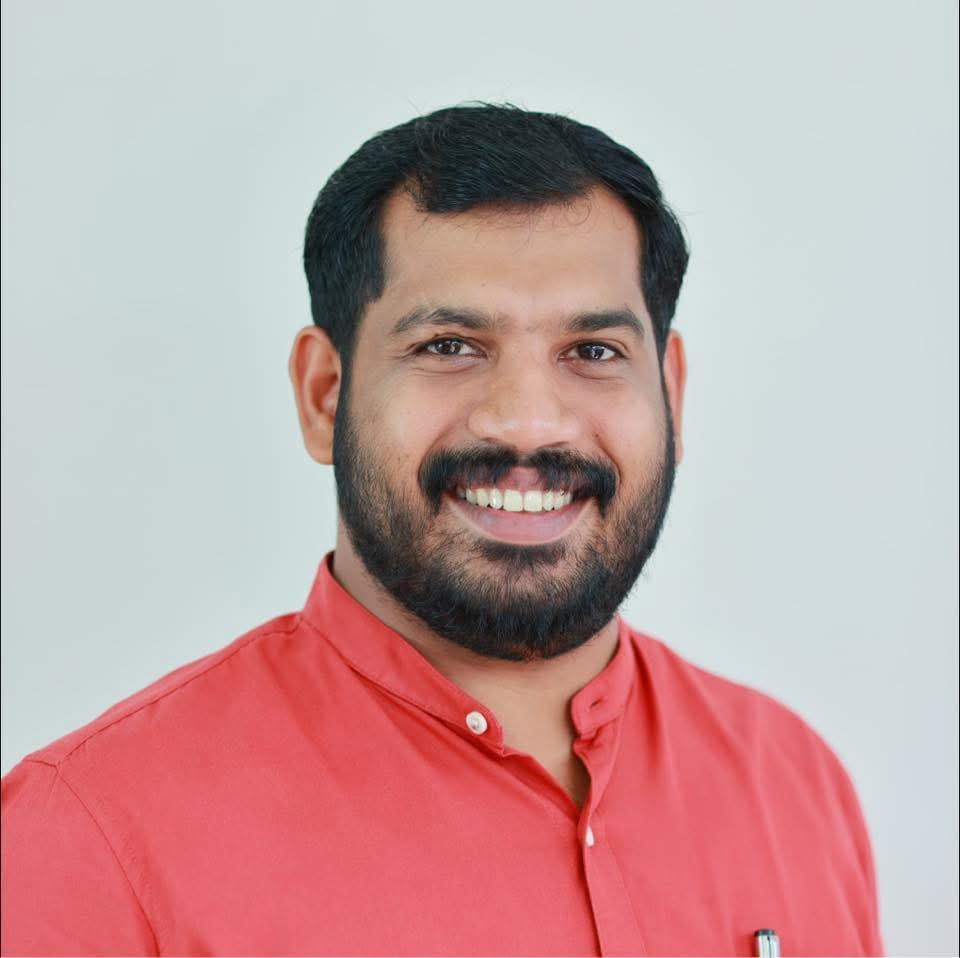

Member of the Kerala Legislative Assembly for Thiruvambady
- In office May 2021 – May 2026
- Preceded by: George M. Thomas
- Succeeded by: C. K. Kasim

Personal details
- Born: 10 April 1992 (age 34) Muthappanpuzha, Kozhikode, Kerala
- Party: Communist Party of India (Marxist)
- Spouse: Anusha K
- Parent(s): Palakkal Joseph, Annamma
- Education: BCom, MCom
- Alma mater: College of Applied Science, Thiruvambady; Mahatma Gandhi University, Kottayam

Linto Joseph (ലിന്‍റോ ജോസഫ്) is an Indian politician and the elected member of Kerala Legislative Assembly representing Thiruvambady constituency of Kozhikode as the member of CPIM during 2021 - 2026. He is a member of CPI(M) Kozhikode District Committee. He was the former President of Koodaranji Grama Panchayat. He was the former joint secretary of SFI Kerala and secretary of SFI Kozhikode, former DC Member of DYFI Kozhikode.

== Political career ==
In 2021 - 2026 he was elected as MLA of Thiruvambady. He was the former President of Koodaranji Grama Panchayat in the year 2020. He was the former joint secretary of SFI Kerala State Committee and secretary of SFI Kozhikode District committee.

In 2025 he was elected to CPI(M) Kozhikode District Committee.
