= Kozhippara Waterfalls =

Waterfalls in Kerala, India

Coordinates: 11°21′12″N 76°06′29″E

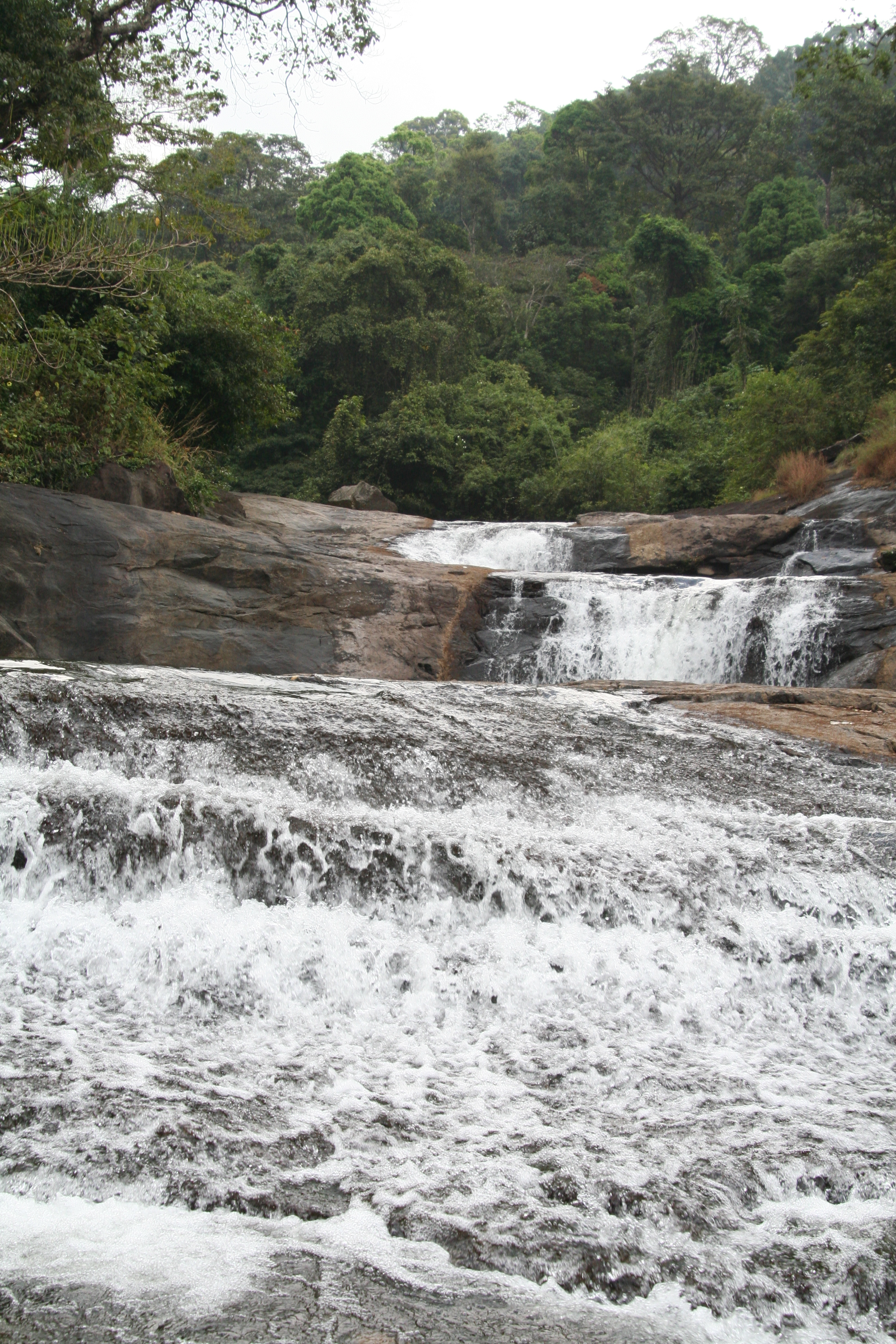
- Interactive map of Kozhippara Waterfalls
- Location: Kakkadampoyil, Malappuram district, Kerala, India
- Elevation: 25 m (82 ft)
- Total height: 150 m (490 ft)
- Number of drops: 6
- Average flow rate: 25 m^{3}/s (880 cu ft/s)

Kozhippara Falls also known as Kakkadampoyil Waterfalls is a waterfalls in the Malappuram district in Kerala, India. It is located in Kakkadampoyil near the Silent Valley National Park on the north eastern border of the Malappuram district. The waterfalls is looked after by the Kerala forest department that comes within the Edavanna Forest Range.
