= Kakkadampoyil =

Village in Kerala, India

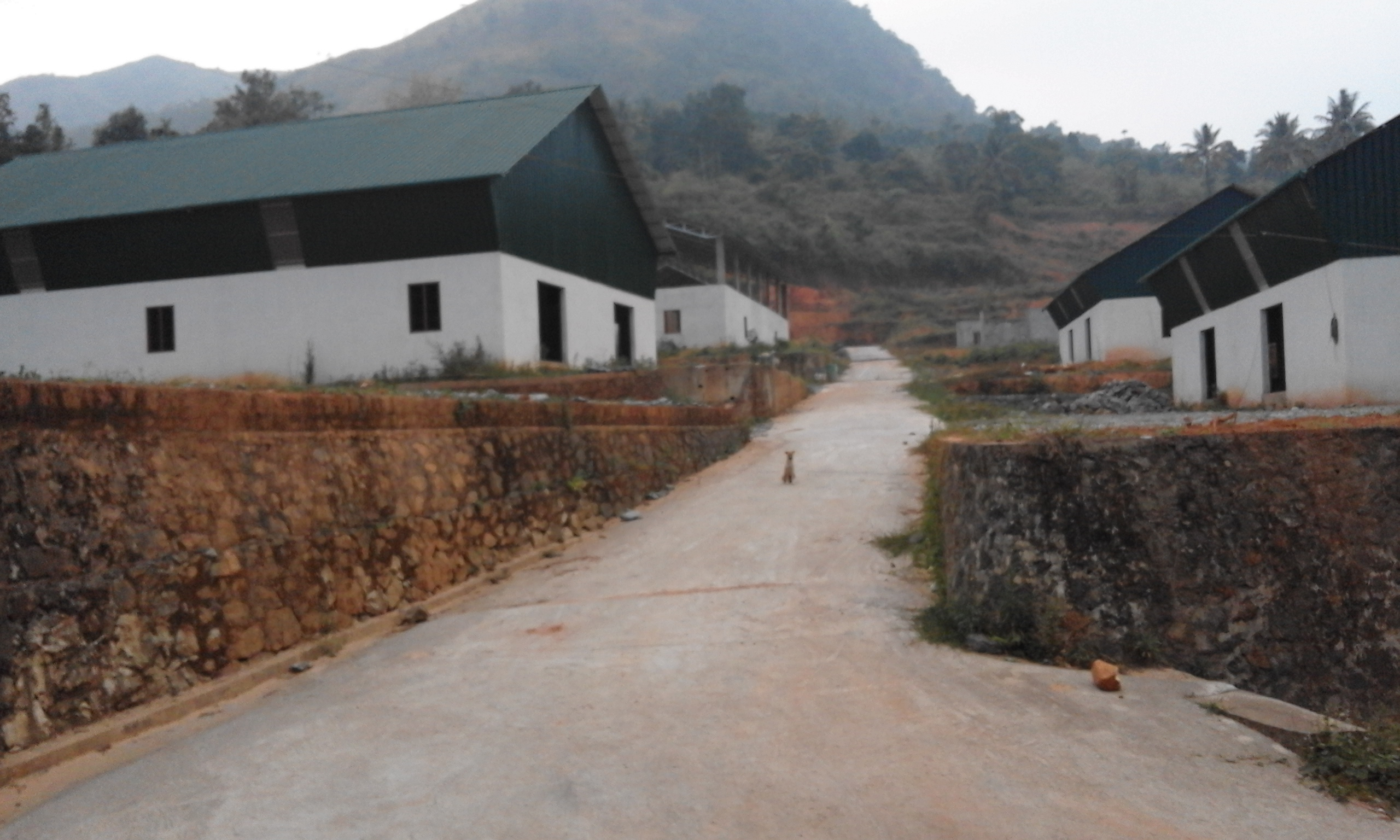
Coconut Factory

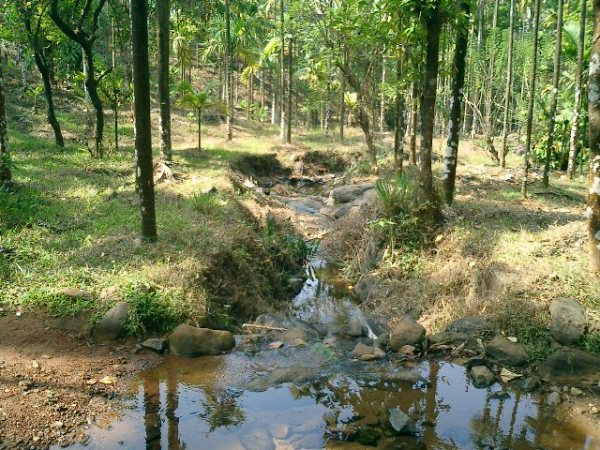
Rubber Plantations

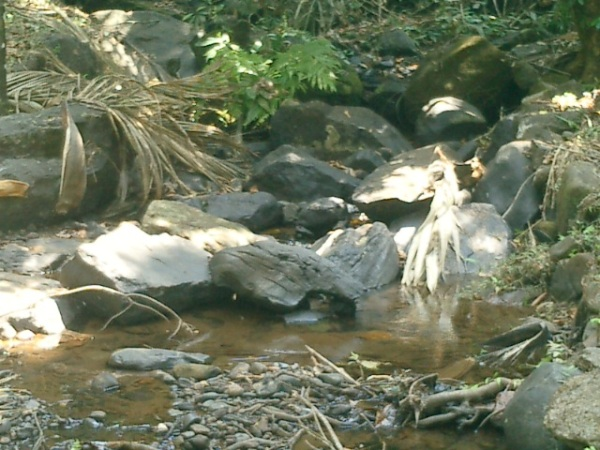
Water Channel

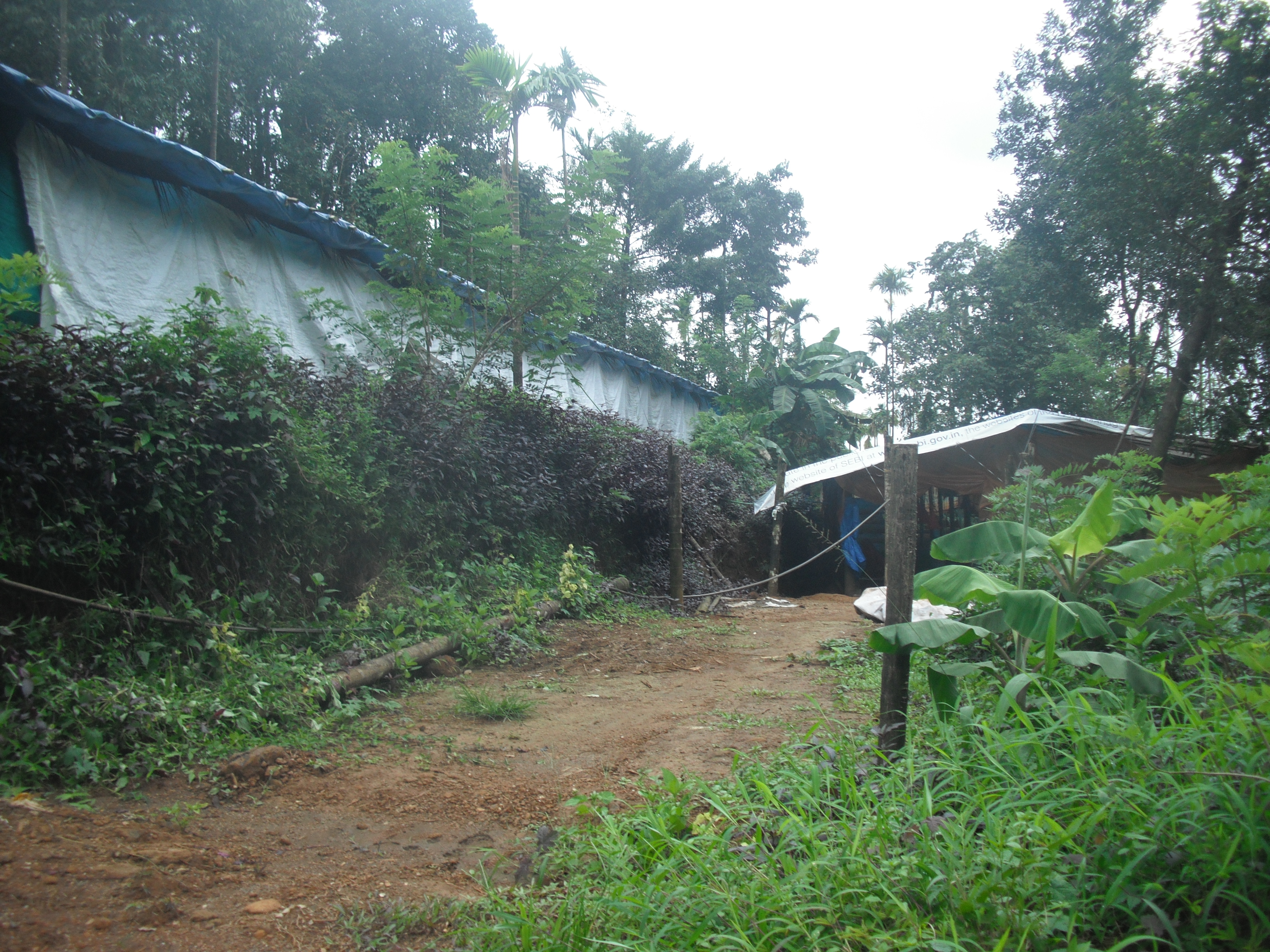
Private farm

Kakkadampoyil, is a small village in Koodranji Grama Panchayat of Kozhikode District, Kerala, India, bordering Urangattiri.

== Location ==
Kakkadampoyil is situated in Koodaranji Panchayat in Kozhikode district near Nilambur. This hilltop village is one of the coolest tourist destinations in Malabar region. It is about 15 km from Koodaranji, 19 km from Thiruvambady and 24 km from Nilambur. Kozhikode city is about 50 km from here. It is set high on the Western Ghats, with altitudes ranging from 700 ft to 2100 ft.

== Tourism ==
A large number of tourists come to Kakkadampoyil to enjoy the cool climate and to stay away from the bustle of the city.

This recent flood of eco-tourism has not been without incident; in July 2023, there was a clash between tourists and local residents. There have been a large increase in tourist-related traffic, leading to 20 reported motor vehicle accidents in two years from 2022 to 2024.

== Climate ==
The year is divided into four seasons: Cold (Malayalam):ശൈത്യം (December to February)), Hot (Malayalam):മധ്യ വേനല്‍ (March to May)), South West Monsoon (Malayalam:കാല വര്ഷം, (June to Sept) and North East monsoon (Malayalam: തുലാ വര്ഷം (Oct to Nov)). During the hot weather, the temperature goes up to a maximum of 30 C and in cold weather, the temperature drops to 15 C. The average rainfall is 2600 millimetres per year.

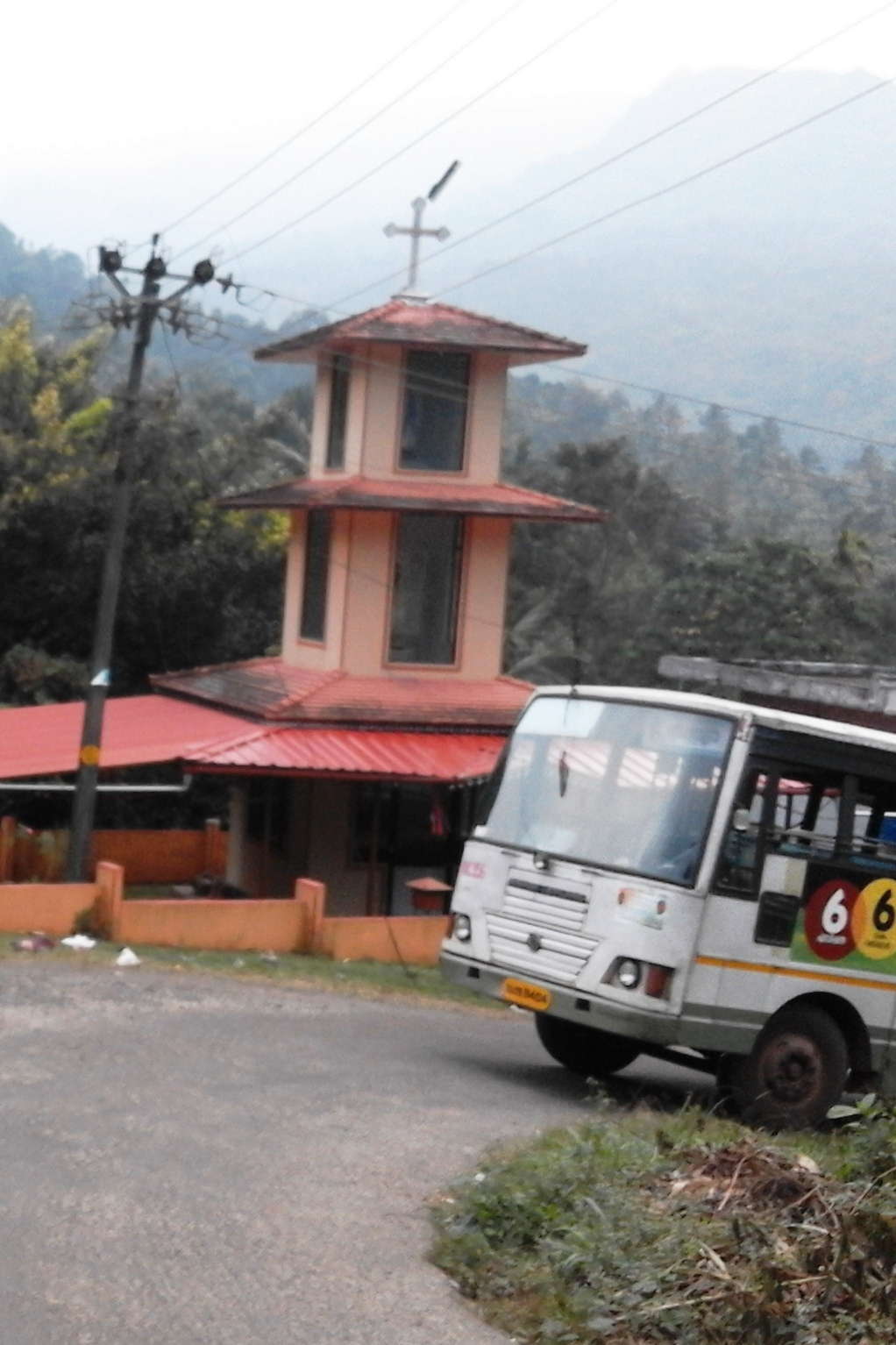
Kozhippara Junction

== Geography ==
Kakkadampoyil stands on the western top of the Western Ghats with dense forest, and deep valleys. It is 24 km from Nilambur. The Cherupuzha (Malayalam: ചെറുപുഴ) is one of the important tributaries of Chaliyar River (:ചാലിയാര്‍).

== Neighboring villages ==
- Koodaranhi
- Thiruvambady
- Akampadam
- Nilambur
- Vettilappara
- Thottumukkam

== Rivers ==
- Iruvanjippuzha
- Chaliyar River
