= Eranad Assembly constituency =

Constituency of the Kerala legislative assembly in India

Eranad
- Constituency No. 34 for the Kerala Legislative Assembly
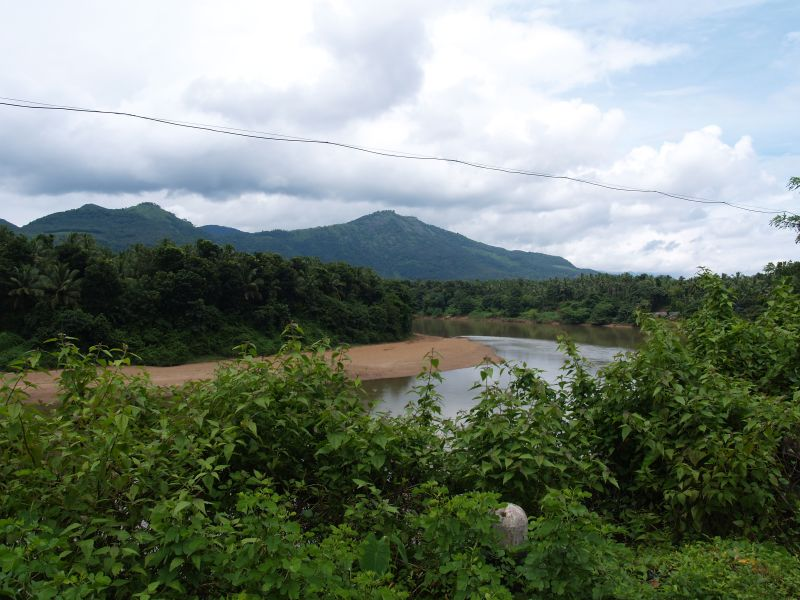
- Chaliyar River flowing through Edavanna

Constituency details
- Country: India
- Region: South India
- State: Kerala
- District: Malappuram
- Established: 2008
- Total electors: 1,79,786 (2021)
- Reservation: None

Member of Legislative Assembly
- 16th Kerala Legislative Assembly
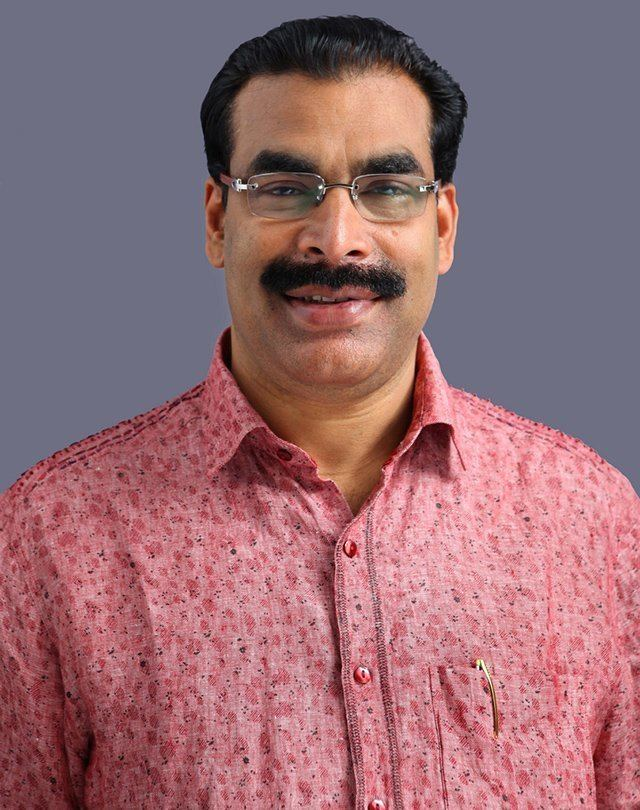
- Incumbent P. K. Basheer
- Party: IUML
- Alliance: UDF
- Elected year: 2026

Eranad State assembly constituency is one of the 140 state legislative assembly constituencies in Kerala in southern India. It is also one of the seven state legislative assembly constituencies included in Wayanad Lok Sabha constituency. As of the 2026 assembly elections, the current MLA is P. K. Basheer of IUML.

== Local self-governed segments ==
Eranad Assembly constituency is composed of the following local self-governed segments:

Name	Status (Grama panchayat/Municipality)	Taluk
Areekode	Grama panchayat	Eranad
Keezhuparamba	Grama panchayat	Eranad
Urangattiri	Grama panchayat	Eranad
Edavanna	Grama panchayat	Eranad
Kavanoor	Grama panchayat	Eranad
Kuzhimanna	Grama panchayat	Kondotty
Chaliyar	Grama panchayat	Nilambur

Eranad (State Assembly constituency)

== Members of Legislative Assembly ==
The following list contains all members of Kerala Legislative Assembly who have represented Eranad Assembly constituency during the period of various assemblies:

Key

IUML

Election	Niyama Sabha	Member	Party	Tenure
2011	13th	P. K. Basheer	IUML	2011 – 2016
2016	14th	P. K. Basheer	IUML	2016 - 2021
2021	15th	P. K. Basheer	IUML	2021-2026
2026	16th	P. K. Basheer	IUML	2026-

== Election results ==
Percentage change (±%) denotes the change in the number of votes from the immediate previous election.

=== 2026 ===
2026 Kerala Legislative Assembly election: Eranad
Party	Candidate	Votes	%	±%
IUML	P. K. Basheer	96,974	58.42	
CPI	Shafeer Kizhissery	56,557	33.94	
BJP	Adv. N. Sreeprakash	8,577	5.17	
SDPI	Chemmala Yousuf Ali	2,530	1.5	
NOTA	None of the above	985	0.58	
BSP	Krishnan Thachannan	467	0.28	
Independent	Mujeeb Rahman	166	0.1	
Margin of victory		41,289		
Turnout		1,66,256		
IUML hold		Swing		

=== 2021 ===
There were 1,79,786 registered voters in the constituency for the 2021 Kerala Assembly election.

2021 Kerala Legislative Assembly election: Eranad
Party	Candidate	Votes	%	±%
IUML	P. K. Basheer	78,076	54.49%	▲3.66
LDF	K. T. Abdurahman	55,530	38.76%	▼2.58
BJP	Adv. C. Dinesh	6,683	4.66%	▲0.20
BSP	Velayudhan	1,247	0.87%	▲0.22
Independent	Adv. Sebastian	1,100	0.77%	N/A
NOTA	None of the above	636	0.44%	▲0.10
Margin of victory		22,546	15.73%	▲6.24
Turnout		1,43,272	79.69%	▼2.13
IUML hold		Swing	▲3.66	

=== 2016 ===
There were 1,66,044 registered voters in Eranad Constituency for the 2016 Kerala Assembly election.

2016 Kerala Legislative Assembly election: Eranad
Party	Candidate	Votes	%	±%
IUML	P. K. Basheer	69,048	50.83%	▼0.46
LDF	K. T. Abdurahiman	56,155	41.34%	▼0.13
BJP	K. P. Baburaj	6,055	4.46%	▲1.45
SP	Adv. Ummer Chelakkode	1,298	0.96%	−
BSP	Velayudhan	885	0.65%	−
Independent	K. T. Abdul Rahiman	825	0.61%	−
PDP	Farooq Chengara	536	0.39%	−
NOTA	None of the above	461	0.34%	−
Independent	V. K. Basheer Vallakkaatt Thodi	245	0.18	−
Independent	Shahanas	193	0.14	−
Independent	P. K. Basheer Palattukuyyan	149	0.11	−
Margin of victory		12,893	9.49%	▼0.33
Turnout		1,35,850	81.82%	▲1.14
IUML hold		Swing	▼0.46	

=== 2011 ===
There were 1,74,945 registered voters in the constituency for the 2011 election.

2011 Kerala Legislative Assembly election: Eranad
Party	Candidate	Votes	%	±%
IUML	P. K. Basheer	58,698	51.29%	−
Independent	P. V. Anvar	47,452	41.47%	−
BJP	K. P. Baburaj	3,448	3.01%	−
CPI	Ashrafali Kaliyath	2,700	2.36%	−
SDPI	P. P. Showkathali	2,137	1.87%	−
Margin of victory		11,246	9.82%	
Turnout		1,14,435	80.68%	
IUML win (new seat)				

== See also ==
- Eranad
- Malappuram district
- List of constituencies of the Kerala Legislative Assembly
- 2016 Kerala Legislative Assembly election
