= Mampad =

- town
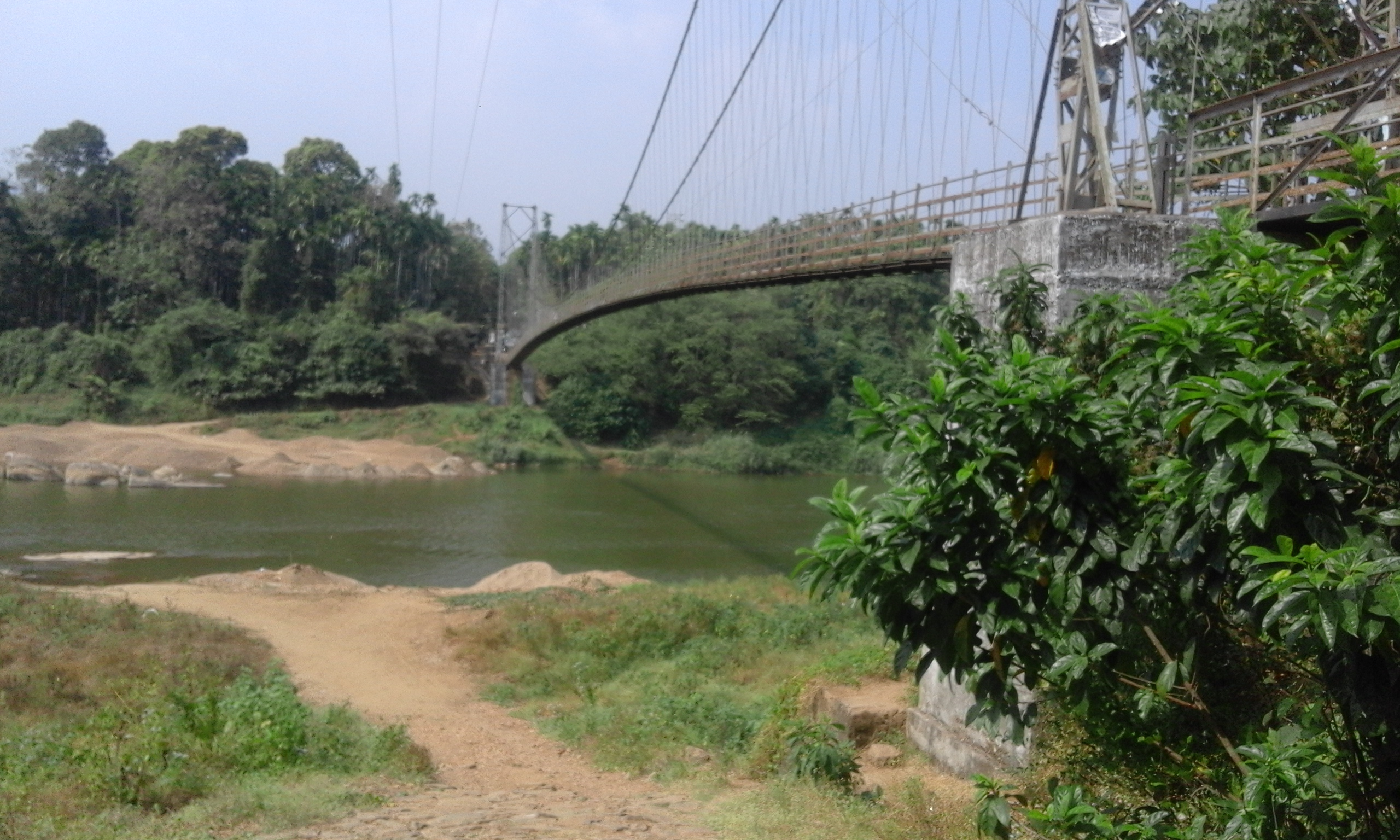
- Mampad Hanging Bridge
- Interactive map of Mampad
- Coordinates: 11.1437°N 76.1119°E
- Country: India
- State: Kerala
- District: Malappuram

Languages
  - Official: Malayalam, English
- Time zone: UTC+5:30 (IST)
- Postal code: 676542
- Telephone code: 04931
- Vehicle registration: KL-71
- Climate: Am (Köppen)

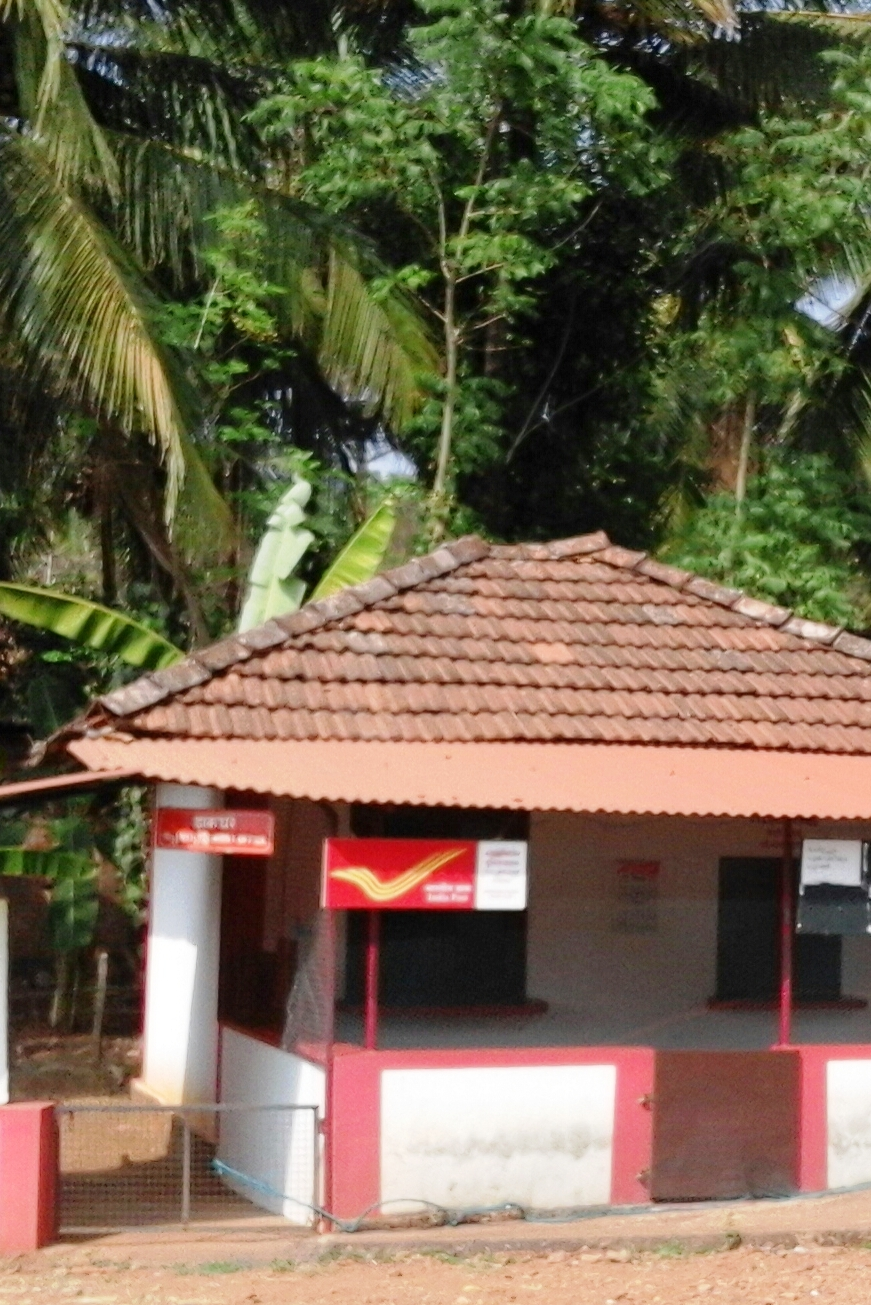
Pullippadam Post Office, Mampad

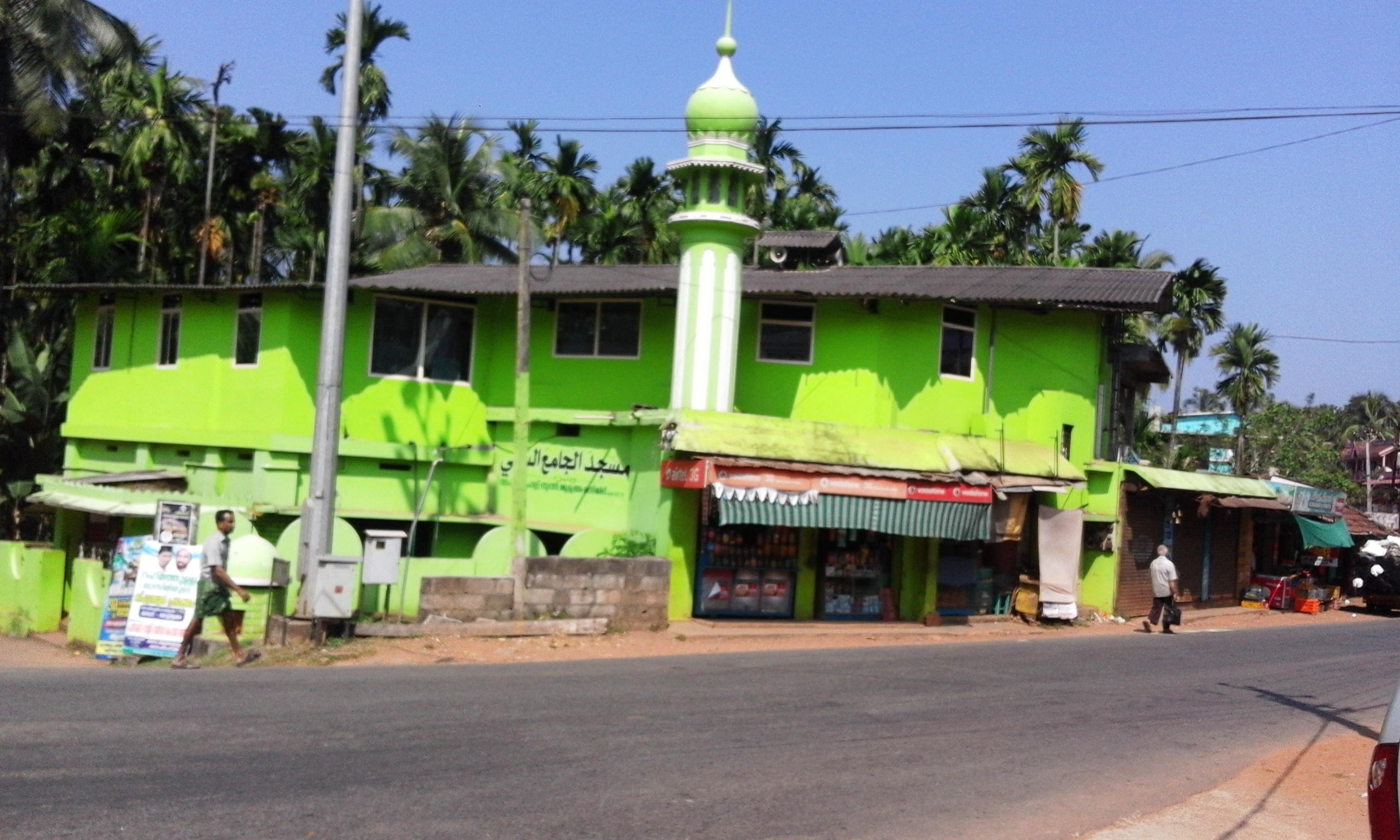
Sunni Masjidh, Vadapuram

Pullippadam Madhrassah

Mampad is a town in the Malappuram district of Kerala, India. It is located about 08 km east of Nilambur city. Nearby places include Edavanna, Areacode, Manjeri, Wandoor, and Pandikkad. It is under the Wandoor Assembly Constituency. The Kozhikode-Nilambur-Gudalur (CNG Road) SH passes through here. The Mampad town is now developing day to day. The majority of the population is involved in agriculture and business activities. Hindus, Christians, and Muslims coexist in harmony, adding to the diversity in faith and religion.

== Schools ==
- GUPS Kattumunda East
- GMLPS Kattumunda East
- A M L P S PULLODE
- A M A U P S Mampad
- G L P S Mampad
- G L P S Meppadam
- G V H S S Mampad
- M E S Higher Secondary School. Mampad
- Mampad High School
- Pullipadam Lp School
- Rahmania Higher Secondary School Meppadam
- The Springs International School
- AKM LP SCHOOL PONGALOOR
- Peace Public School Pallikkunnu

== Colleges ==
- Dr. Gafoor Memorial MES Mampad College, Mampad
- NET Distance Education, (Under the Nest Educational Trust)

== Hospitals ==
- Life Medicare Centre aka പാറമ്മൽ ഹോസ്പിറ്റൽ (Since 1995)
- Government Primary Health Centre, Mampad
- Hi Care Clinic
- Rahmath Hospital

== River ==
Chaliyar

== Famous Personalities ==
Asif Saheer-Indian former football player MAMPAD RAHMAN Former national Football player SHABEERALI Former State Football player

== Banks ==
- service co-operative bank
- Kerala Gramin Bank
- south indian bank
- vanitha cooperative bank

== ATM ==
- HDFC Bank ATM
- Kerala Gramin Bank ATM
- south indian Bank ATM
- State Bank of India, SBI ATM

== Places of interest ==
- odayikkal regulator cum bridge
- Pullipadam hanging bridge
- oli waterfalls
- thampiz

== Nearby Places ==
Edavanna Nilambur Chaliyar Vadapuram Wandoor Areacode Manjeri Kattumunda Pulikalody

== Transportation ==
Mampad village connects to other parts of India through Nilambur town. State Highway No.28 starts from Nilambur and connects to Ooty, Mysore and Bangalore through Highways.12,29 and 181. National highway No.66 passes through Ramanattukara and the northern stretch connects to Goa and Mumbai. The southern stretch connects to Cochin and Trivandrum. State. The nearest airport is at Kozhikode. The nearest railway station is at Nilambur

== Image gallery ==
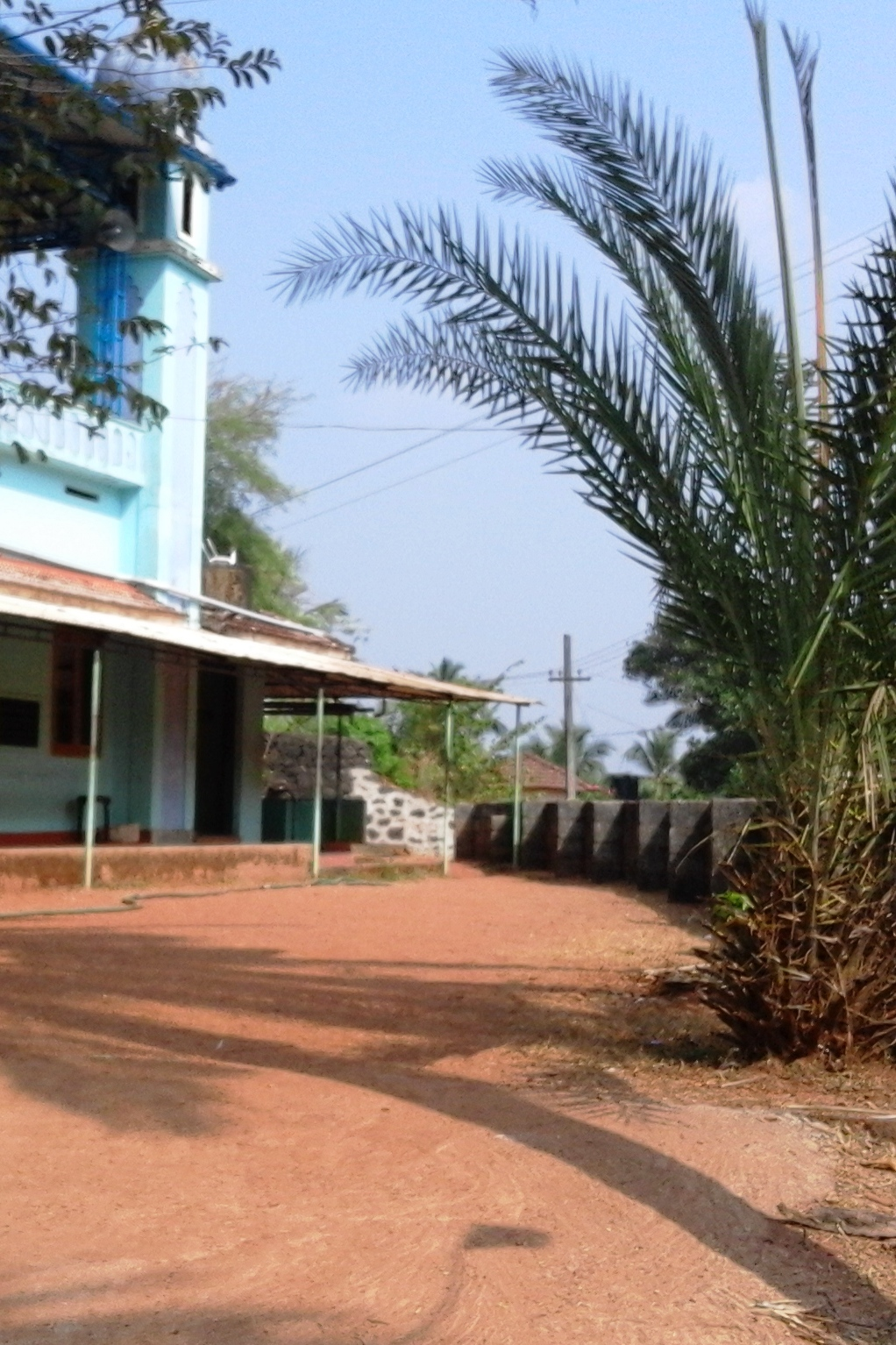
Pullippadam Mosque

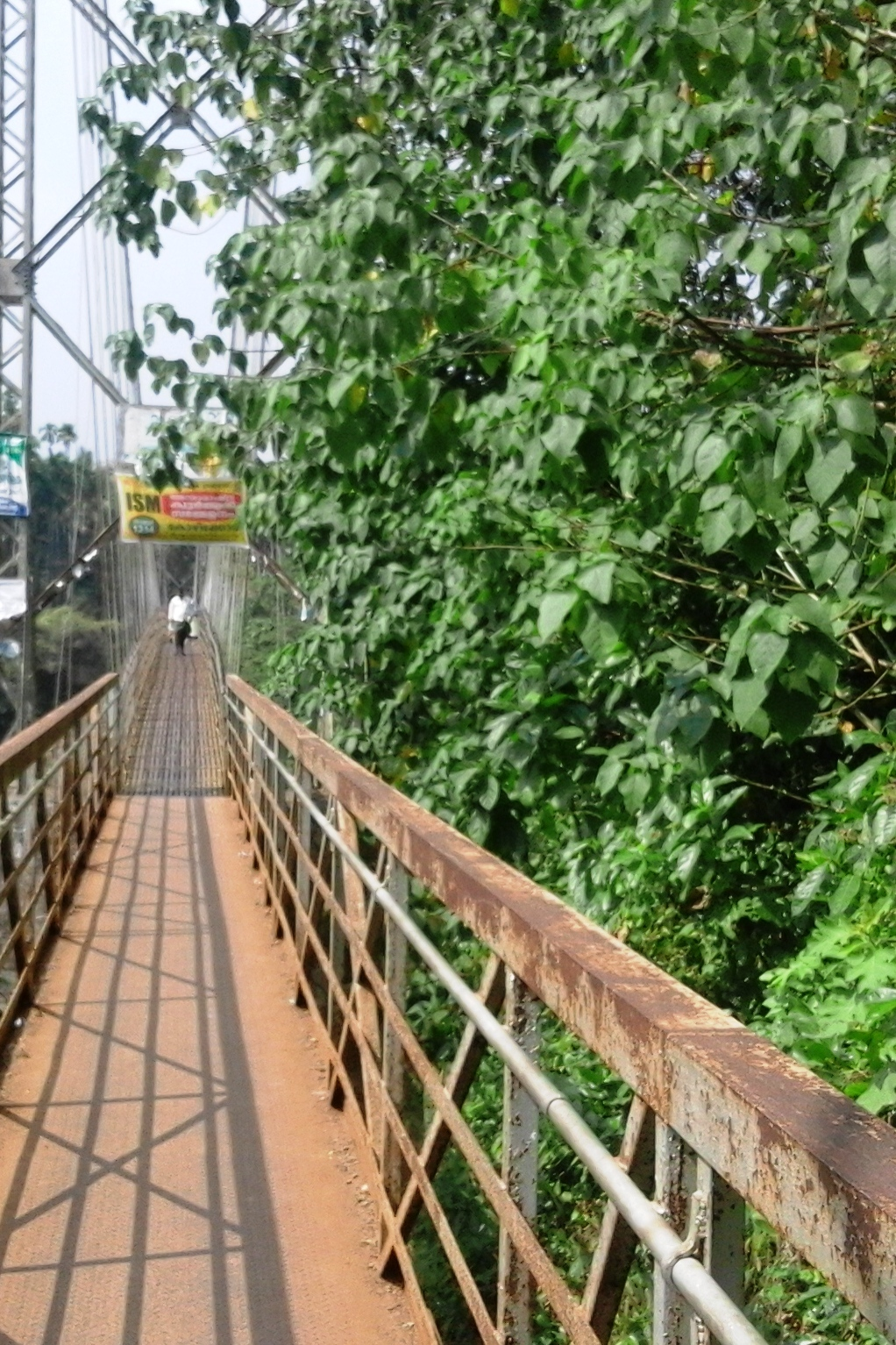
Hanging Bridge to Pullippadam

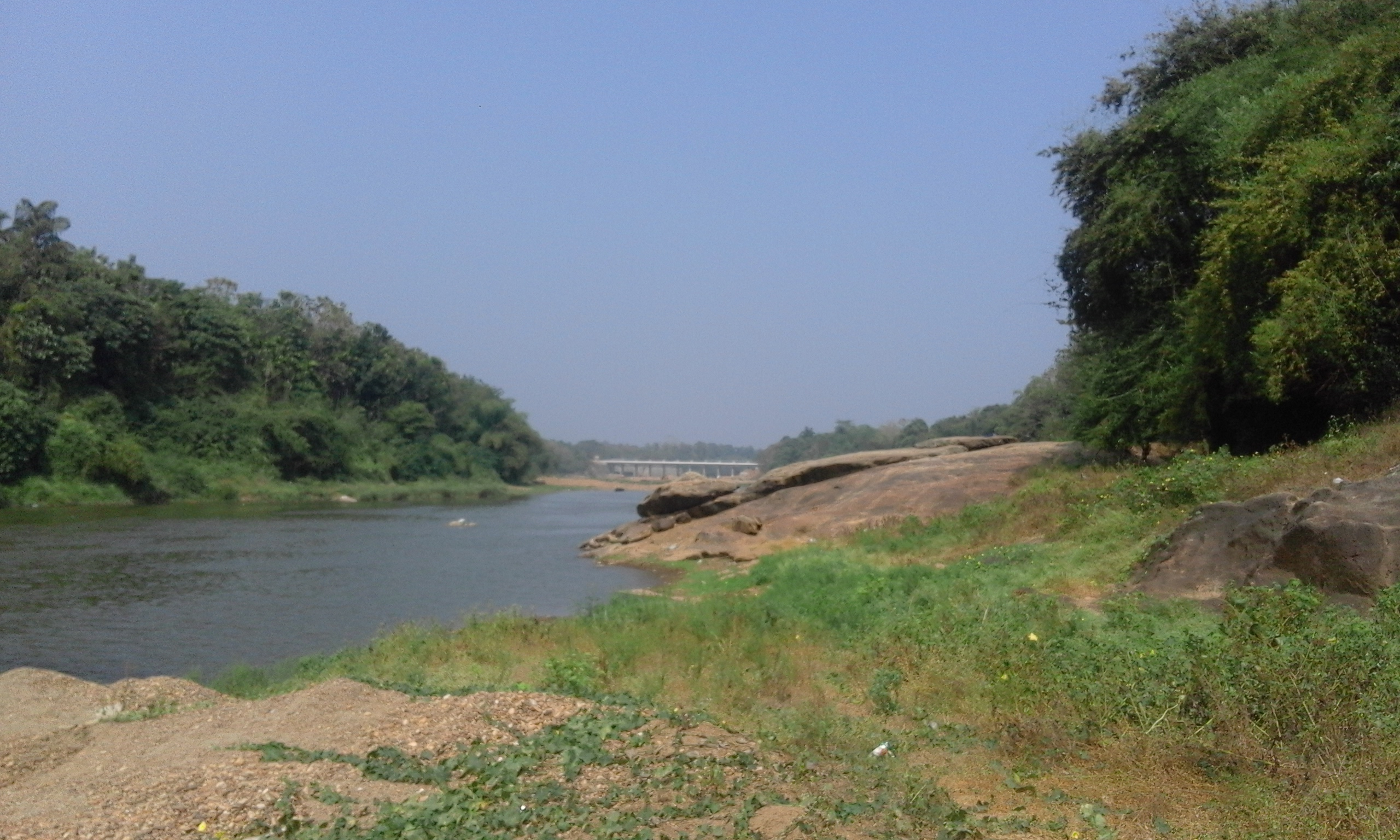
River Chaliyar at Mampad

File:MAMPAD panjayath
