= Kottappuzha =

River in Kerala, India

The Kottappuzha River is river in Kerala, western India.

The Kottappuzha is a tributary of the Kuthirappuzha River, which is itself a tributary of the Chaliyar River. It rises on the western slopes of Upper Bhavani Reservoir in the Nilgiris district of Tamil Nadu.

Near Kottappuzha Palam (bridge), about 1.5 km south of Pookkottumpadam, it is joined by the 'Chokkadan puzha', a river flowing from the Kozhippara hills, which passes through Chokkad before joining with the Kottappuzha. The Kottappuzha flows into the Kuthirappuzha at Koorad.
