= Kuthirappuzha =

River in Kerala, India

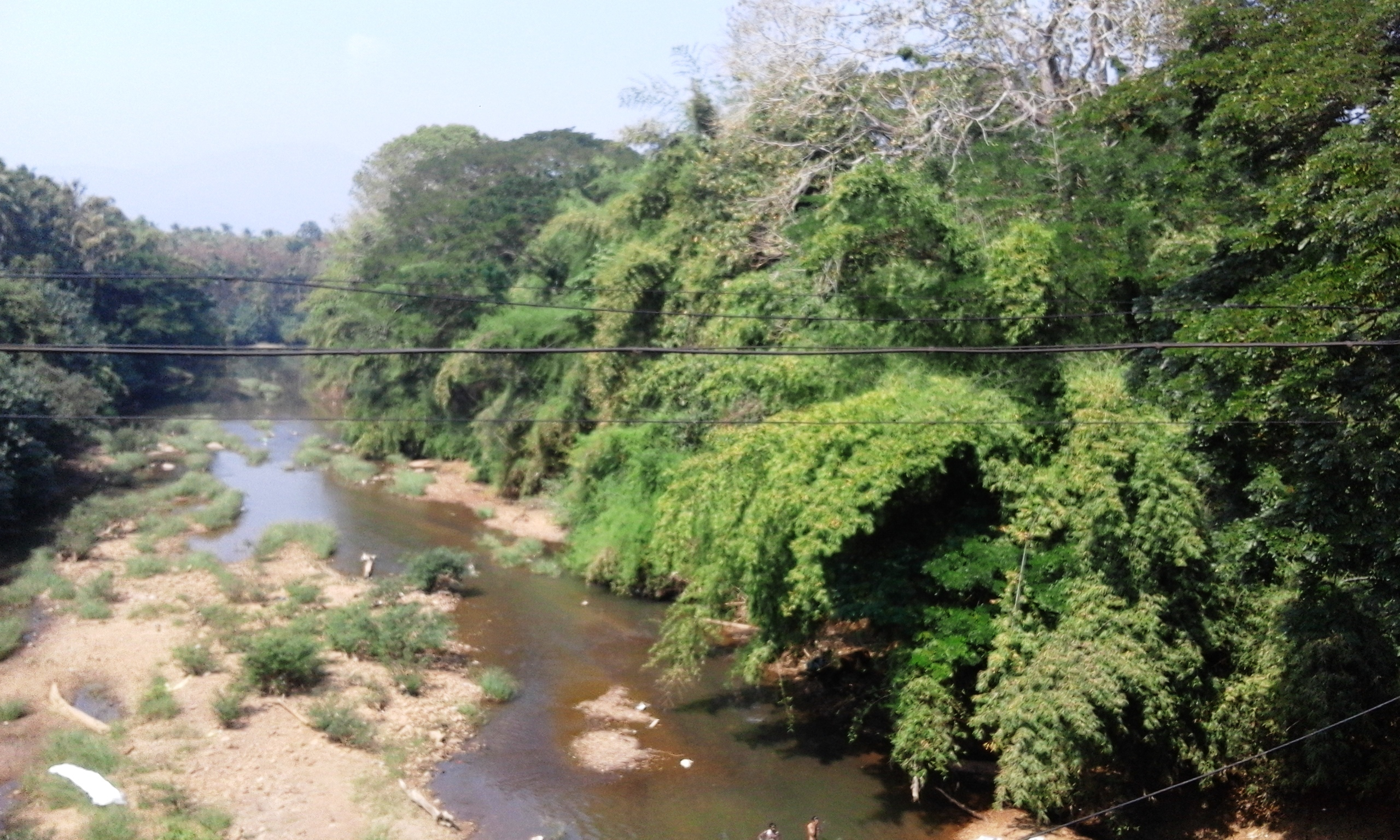
Vadapuram Bridge

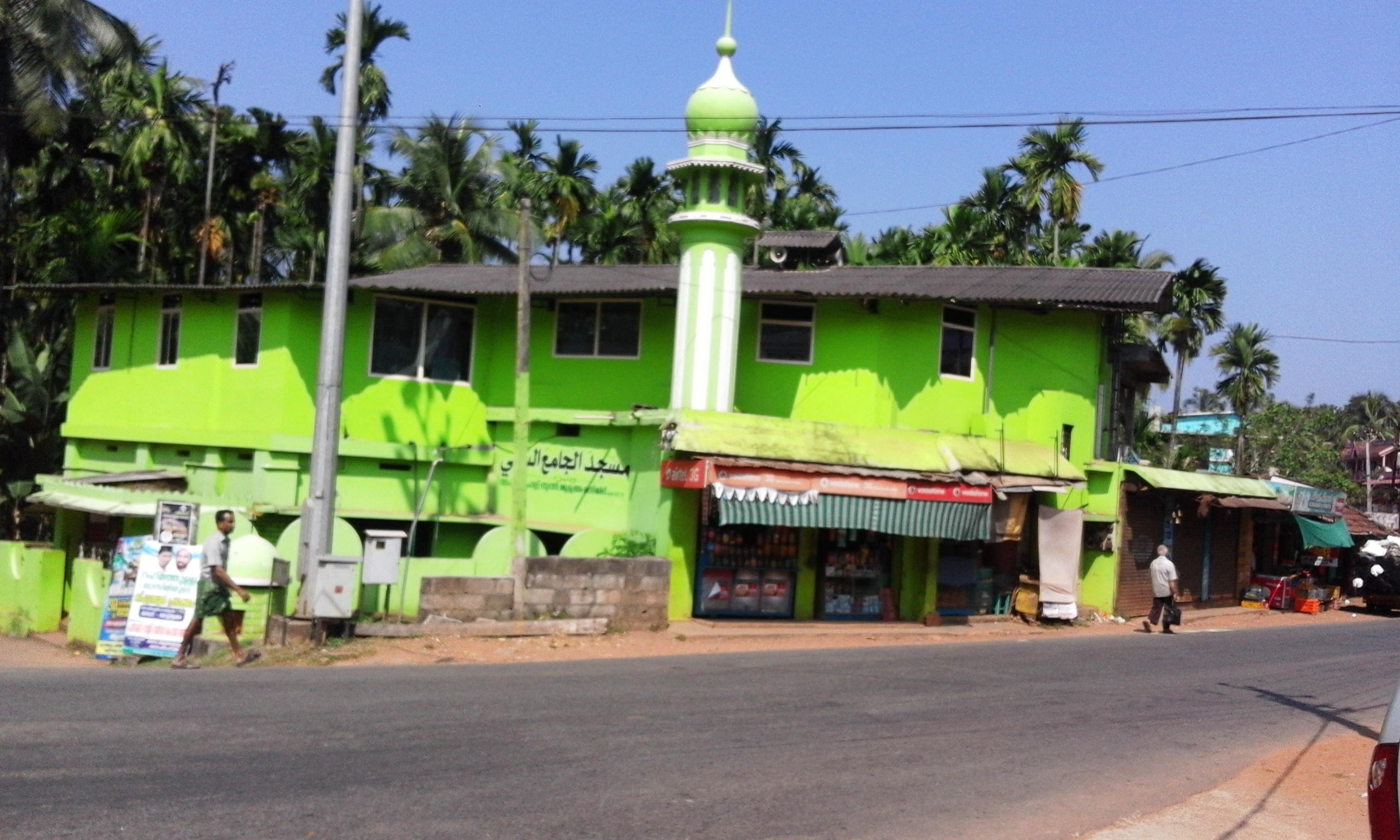
Vadapuram Junction

Kuthirappuzha is a tributary of Chaliyar in the Kerala state of India. The river joins Chaliyar at Vadapuram (behind Kerala state wood industries limited) near Nilambur. Kuthirappuzha is originating from forests south-west of Upper Bhavani reservoir in Nilgiris district of Tamil Nadu. It flows through Pookkottum Padam town and on reaching Koorad, Kottappuzha joins with Kuthirappuzha.
