= Cherupuzha (Areekode) =

River in Kerala, India

Thottumukkam River is one of the many tributaries of Chaliyar river. It originates from Ambumala near Kakkadampoyil and meets Chaliyar at Areacode. It separates Kozhikode and Malappuram districts of Kerala in Thottumukkam region, hence earning the name Thottumukkampuzha. One branch from Mysoremala and another branch from Odakkayam join at Thottumukkam.
