= C. Moyinkutty =

Indian politician (1943–2020)

Member of Kerala Legislative Assembly
- In office 2011–2016
- Constituency: Thiruvambadi

Personal details
- Born: 5 August 1943 Thamarassery
- Died: 9 November 2020 (aged 77)
- Party: Indian Union Muslim League
- Spouse: Khadeeja

C. Moyinkutty (5 August 1943 – 9 November 2020) was an MLA, and the State Vice President of Indian Union Muslim League. He was previously elected to Kerala Legislative Assembly in 1996, 2006 and 2011 from Koduvally (1996-2001) and Thiruvambady (2001-2006; 2011-2016) constituencies. He was the Muthavalli and the President of Andona Mahal Juma Masjid.

Moyinkutty died on 9 November 2020 at the age of 77.

== Positions held ==
- State President and General Secretary of Muslim Youth League
- Kozhikode District Secretary and Treasurer of Muslim League
- Member K.S.R.D.B; Wakf Board
- President of Grama Panchayat, Thamarassery.
- Member of Legislative Assembly in 1996-2001 (Koduvally constituency)
- Member of Legislative Assembly in 2001-2006 (Thiruvambady constituency)
- Member of Legislative Assembly in 2011-2016 (Thiruvambady constituency)
- Member of KSRTC Adversary board

== Personal life ==
He was the son of Ahamed Kutty Haji and Kunhi Umacha. He was born at Thamarassery on 5 August 1943. He was married to Khadeeja and had three children. His children's names are Ansar M Ahammed, Haseena O, Mubeena.
