= George M. Thomas =

George M. Thomas may refer to:

- George M. Thomas (American politician)
- George M. Thomas (Indian politician)
