= Cherupuzha (Mavoor) =

River in Kerala, India

Cherupuzha is one of the tributaries of the Chaliyar River.

It originates from the foothills of the Thamarassery churam as three separate rivulets. Iruthullippuzha (coming from Manalvayal) and Kadungampuzha (from Adivaram) merge near Kaithappoyil. Engappuzha join to it near Kuppayakkode and forms Cherupuzha. Cherupuzha passes very near to the campus of the National Institute of Technology Calicut, at chenoth and is the sole source of water to the resident academic community there. Due to active sand lobbying on the banks of the river, there is an acute threat of the river drying up in the summer, or changing its course. It joins with the Chaliyar at Kavanakkallu Regulator-cum-Bridge near Mavoor.
