= C. K. Kasim =

Indian politician

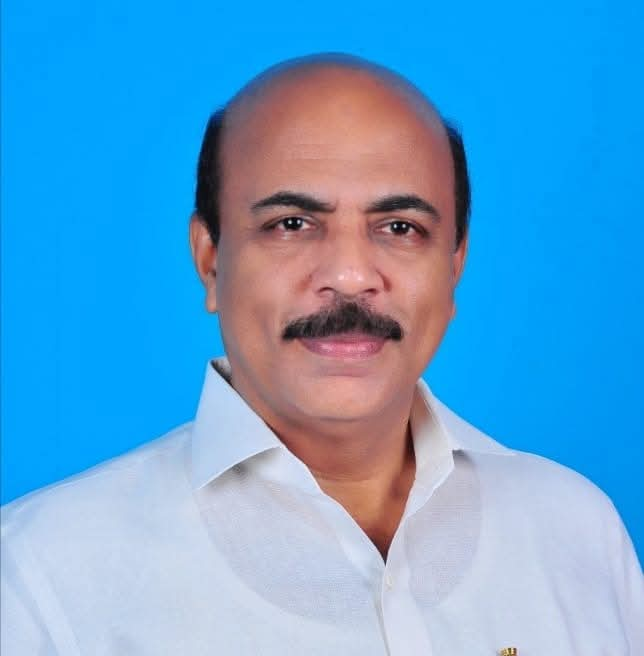

Member of the Kerala Legislative Assembly
- Incumbent
- Assumed office May 2026
- Preceding: Linto Joseph
- Constituency: Thiruvambady

Personal details
- Born: Chenganakunnel Kasim; 22 May 1967 (age 59) Koodaranji, Kozhikode, Kerala, India
- Party: Indian Union Muslim League
- Education: St Sebastian HSS Koodaranji
- Occupation: Politician

C. K. Kasim ( സി കെ കാസിം) is an Indian politician from Kerala and a member of the Indian Union Muslim League. He represents the Thiruvambady constituency in the Kerala Legislative Assembly. He was the previous Kozhikode District Panchayat Member from Thiruvambady and previous Koodaranji Grama Panchayat President.

== Political career ==
CK Kasim is a member of the Indian Union Muslim League and served as President of IUML Thiruvambady Assembly Constituency. In the 2026 Kerala Legislative Assembly election, he contested as the candidate for the United Democratic Front (UDF) in the Thiruvambady seat.

He defeated the sitting MLA, Linto Joseph of the CPI(M), with a margin of 6,741 votes. His victory was noted as part of a significant shift in Kozhikode district, where the UDF won 12 of the 13 available seats.

== Election results ==
=== 2026 ===
2026 Kerala Legislative Assembly election: Thiruvambady
| Party | Candidate | Votes | % | ±% |
|---|---|---|---|---|
| IUML | C. K. Kasim | 77,140 | 49.23 | |
| CPI(M) | Linto Joseph | 70,399 | 44.93 | |
| Twenty 20 Party | Sunny Thomas | 7,380 | 4.71 | |
| AAP | Sunny V. Joseph | 812 | 0.52 | |
| Majority | | 6,741 | 4.30 | {{{change}}} |
| Turnout | | 1,56,640 | 82.10 | {{{change}}} |
| IUML gain from CPI(M) | | Swing | {{{swing}}} | |
