= Upper Bhavani =

Upper Bhavani is located in the Nilgiris Hills of Western Ghats in Tamil Nadu, India. It is the birthplace of the Bhavani River. The Upper Bhavani Dam is constructed across the river at its source.

== See also ==
- Mudumalai National Park
