= Kizhuparamba =

Village in India

- Village
- Location in Kerala, India Kizhuparamba (India)
- Coordinates: 11°14′50″N 76°0′54″E
- Country: India
- State: Kerala
- District: Malappuram

Population
  - Total: 20,000

Languages
  - Official: Malayalam,
- Time zone: UTC+5:30 (IST)
- Postal code: 673639
- Vehicle registration: KL-10 & KL-84
- Coastline: 0 kilometres (0 mi)
- Climate: Tropical monsoon (Köppen)
- Avg. summer temperature: 35 °C (95 °F)
- Avg. winter temperature: 20 °C (68 °F)

Kizhuparamba or Keezhuparamba is a village and panchayath on the northern boundary of Malappuram district in Kerala, India, on the banks of the Chaliyar River. Kizhuparamba panchayat was formed on 1 August 1977 from the former Urngattiri Panchayat. It has a geographical area of 14.99 km^{2}.
