= Edavanna =

- Town
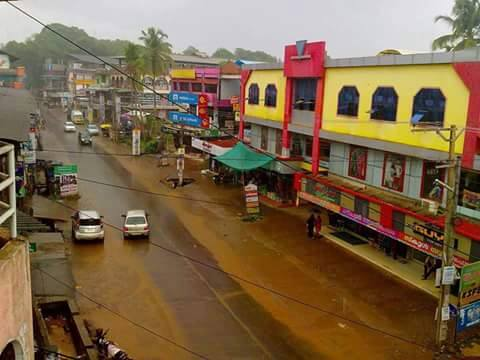
- Edavanna Town
- Interactive map of Edavanna
- Coordinates: 11.2154°N 76.1413°E
- Country: India
- State: Kerala
- District: Malappuram

Area
  - Total: 49.13 km^{2} (18.97 sq mi)

Languages
  - Official: Malayalam, English
- Time zone: UTC+5:30 (IST)
- PIN: 676541
- Telephone code: 0483
- Vehicle registration: KL-10
- Website: http://lsgkerala.in/edavannapanchayat

Edavanna is a town in the Eranad Taluk of Malappuram District, Kerala, South India. The town is situated on the Kozhikode-Nilambur-Gudalur state highway and near the banks of the Chaliyar River. The Koyilandy-Edavanna state highway ends here. Edavanna is part of the Eranad Assembly Constituency and Wayanad Lok Sabha Constituency.
