= George M. Thomas (Indian politician) =

Indian politician

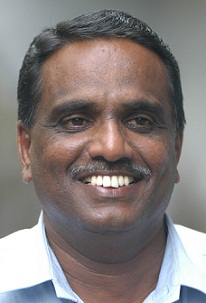
George M. Thomas

George M. Thomas (born 22 November 1954) is an Indian politician, a member of the Communist Party of India (Marxist). He is former Member of the Legislative Assembly (MLA) of Kerala from Thiruvambady.

== Personal life ==
George M. Thomas was born on 22 November 1954 at Kelothu Vayal in Kayanna Panchayath in a middle-class family. His father is Thomas and mother is Annamma. He has three brothers and five sisters. He completed high school education from St. George's High School, Kulathuvayal and joined St. Philomina's College in Mysore for higher studies, but was not able to complete the degree course for personal reasons. He married Anice, daughter of Varkey and Anna on 10 January 1976. The couple has a son and a daughter. He is a staunch atheist.

== As a party worker ==
He joined Kisan sabha and KSYF in 1977 and served as its vice-president Kodiyathur Panchayath. Later he became an active worker of CPI(M) in 1980 and held the post of branch secretary, local secretary, and area secretary before entering electoral politics.

== Electoral Politics ==
George M. Thomas represented Thiruvambady in Kerala Niyamasabha in 2006 by-election after Mathai Chacko's death and was also candidate in 2011 assembly election. In 2016 assembly election he repeated his victory that happened in 2006.

== Current status ==
He is former MLA of Thiruvambady Assembly Constituency and working as a CPI(M) DC member, AIKS state committee member, and as district joint secretary. Presently he resides in Thottumukkam, Kozhikode district.
