= Chaliyar =

River in Kerala, India

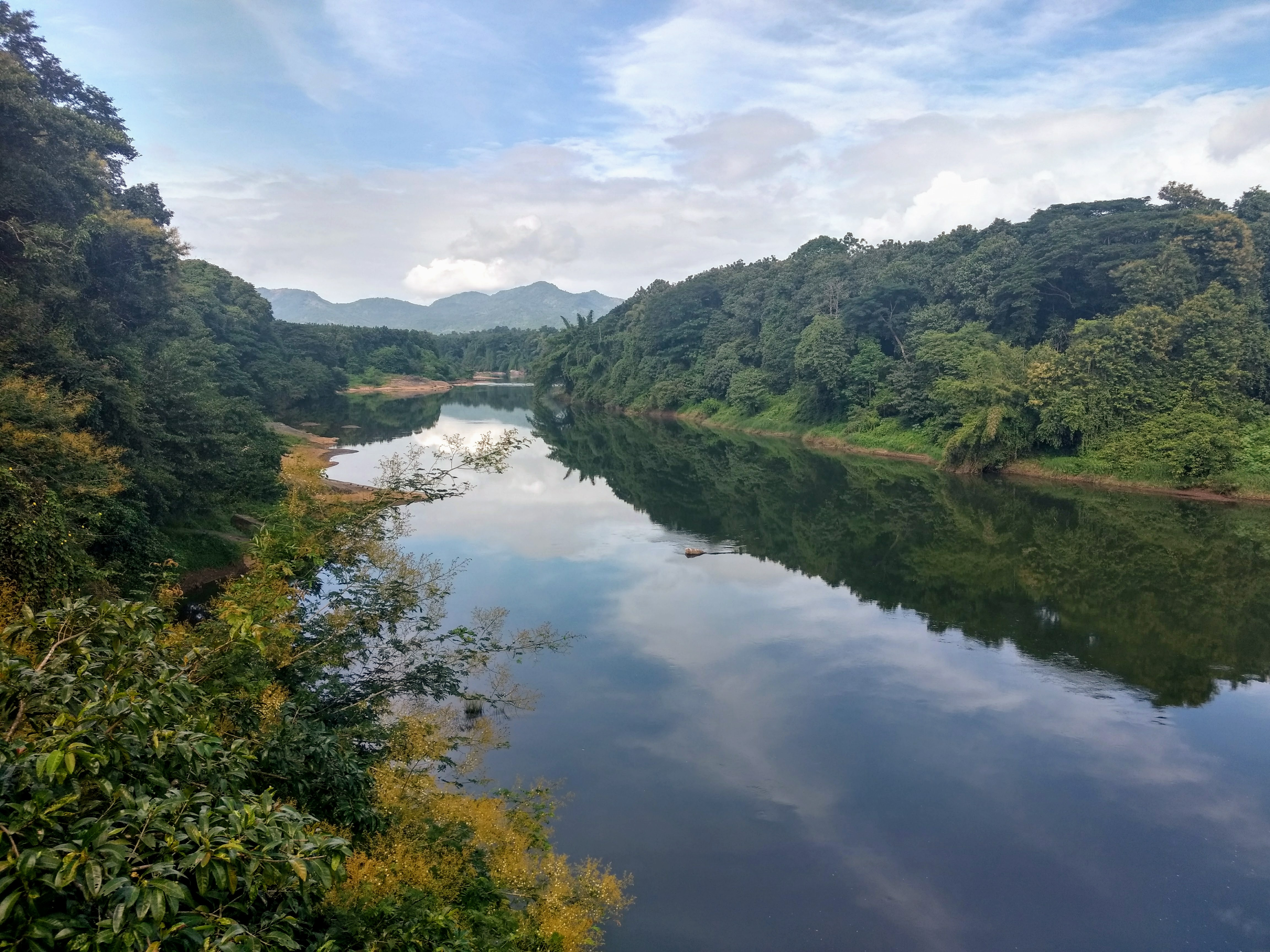
- A view of Chaliyar at Nilambur, Malappuram, India

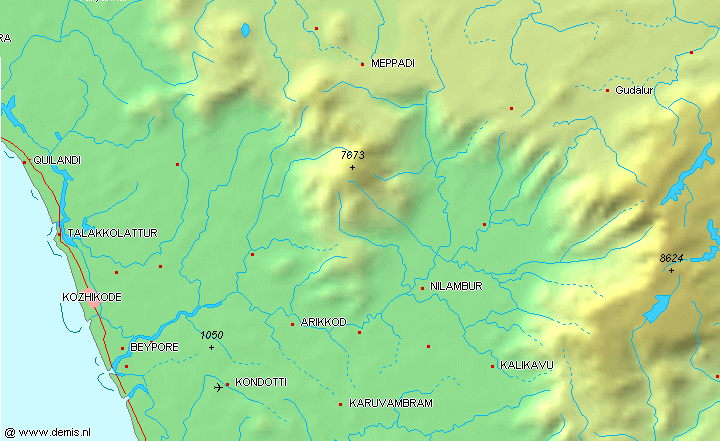
- Labelled map of Chaliyar

Location
- Country: India
- State: Kerala, Tamil Nadu
- District: Wayanad, Malappuram, Kozhikode
- City: Pothukal, Chungathara, Nilambur, Mampad, Edavanna, Kavanoor, Perakamanna, Areekode, Kizhuparamba, Elamaram, cheekode, Vazhakkad, Vazhayur, Cheruvadi, Mavoor, Peruvayal, Perumanna, Aakode, Feroke, Chaliyam.

Physical characteristics
- Source: Elambaleri Hills
  - location: Western Ghats, Wayanad, India
- Mouth: Lakshadweep Sea
  - location: Chaliyam, Kerala, India
  - coordinates: 11.16°N 75.80°E
  - elevation: 0 m (0 ft)
- Length: 169 km (105 mi)
- Basin size: 2,933 km^{2} (1,132 sq mi)

Basin features
- Tributaries
  - left: Iruvazhinjipuzha, Cherupuzha, Engappuzha
  - right: Cherupuzha Nilambur

Chaliyar River (Malayalam: [tʃaːlijaːr]) is the fourth longest river in Kerala, India, at 169 km in length. The Chaliyar is also known as Chulika River, Nilambur River or Beypore River as it is near the sea. Its tributaries flow through both the districts of Malappuram and Kozhikode. Its banks in the Nilambur region is also known for its gold fields. Explorations done at the valley of the river Chaliyar in Nilambur have shown reserves of the order of 2.5 million cubic meters of placers with 0.1 gram per cubic meter of gold. It originates at the Ilambaleri hills of Nilgiri Mountains in Nilgiris district (Ooty district), which is also near Wayanad-Malappuram district border. It flows mainly through the erstwhile region of Eranad (present-day Malappuram district), and empties into the Arabian Sea at Beypore port, opposite to Chaliyam harbour.

== Name ==
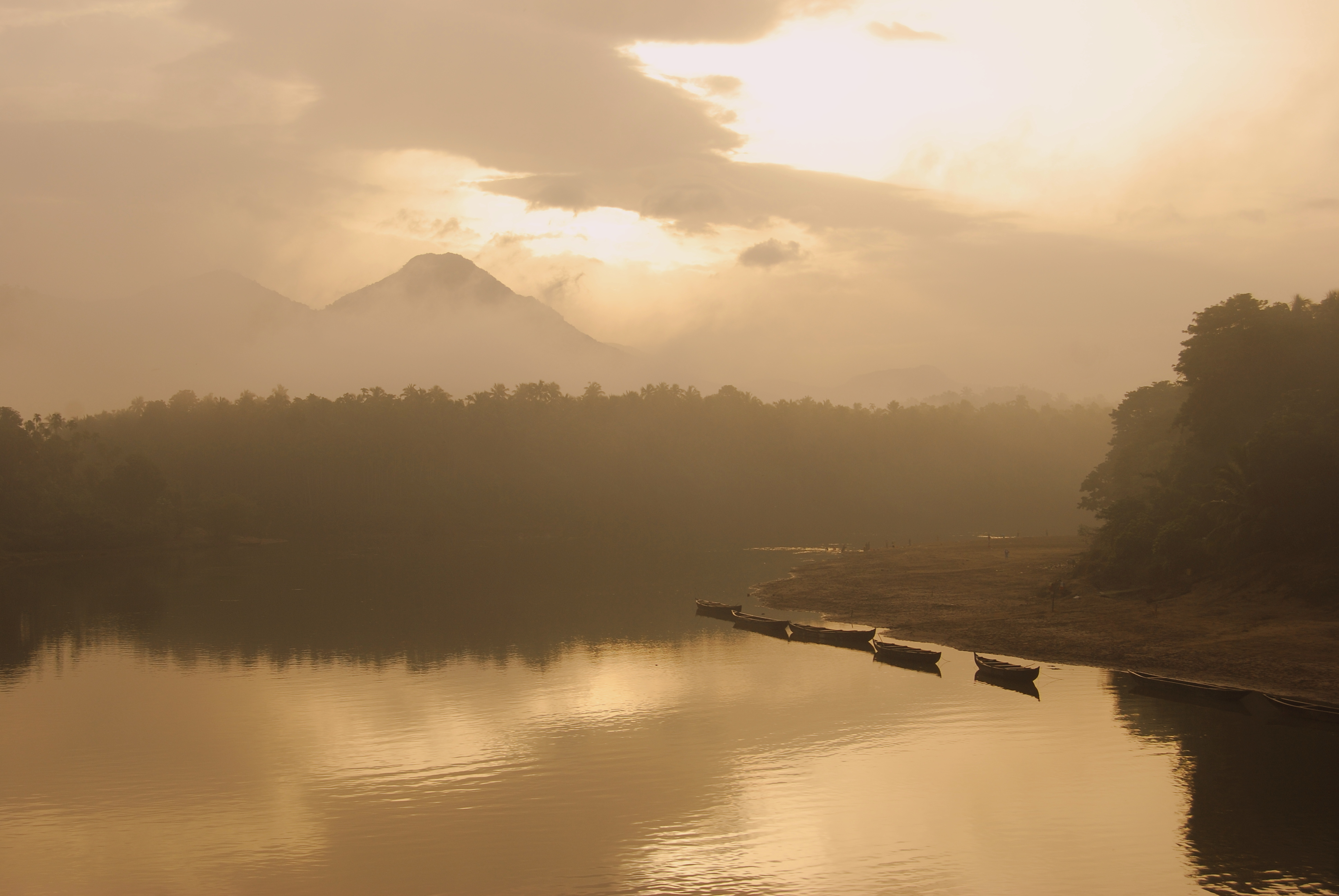
Chaliyar at Areekode

The river has three names - Chaliyar, Nilambur, and Beypor, of which the first one is more popular. The river meets the Lakshadweep Sea

Chaliyar is also the name of a place and a Grama panchayat in Nilambur Taluk, which is located near the Nilambur Municipality, where Conolly's plot, the oldest manmade teak plantation in the world is located.

== Course ==
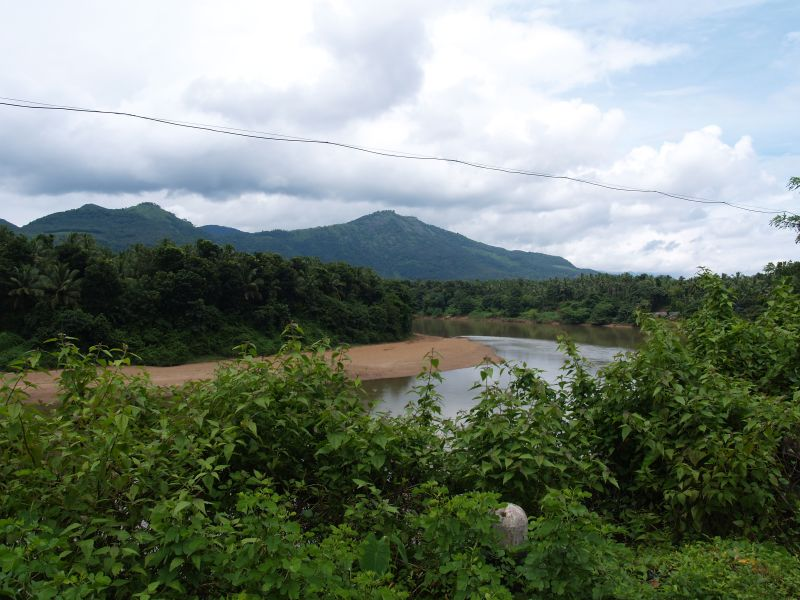
Chaliyar River at Edavanna

The Chaliyar originates in the Western Ghats range at Ilambaleri hills in the ranges of Nilgiri Mountains of Western Ghats, which is also near Wayanad-Malappuram district border. Chaliyar flows through Malappuram District for most of its length and then for around 17 km it forms the boundary between Malappuram District and Kozhikode District before entering the city of Kozhikode for its final 10 km journey and finally empties into the Lakshadweep Sea at Beypore. Six major streams Chaliyarpuzha, Punnapuzha, Kanjirapuzha, Karimpuzha, Iruvahnipuzha and Thottumukkampuzha constitute the Chaliyar River drainage system. Other important tributaries are Kurumanpuzha, Pandipuzha, Maradipuzha, Kuthirapuzha and Karakkodupuzha. Most of these rivers have their origin in the Nilgiri hills in the east and Wayanad hills in the north, where they form a number of rapids and waterfalls.

== Tributaries ==
- Cherupuzha (Mavoor)
  - Engappuzha
  - Iruthullippuzha
  - Kadungampuzha
- Iruvanjippuzha
  - Pulingappuzha
  - Chalippuzha. The Thusharagiri Falls are situated on this river.
  - Muthappanpuzha
- Thottumukkampuzha
- Kuthirappuzha
  - Kottappuzha
- Kuruvanpuzha
- Kanjirappuzha
- Karimpuzha
  - Cherupuzha (Karulai)
  - Punnappuzha or Pandiyar
    - Maruthappuzha or Kalakkanpuzha
      - Karakkodan puzha
- Pandippuzha
- Neerppuzha
- Vadapurampuzha

In addition to these rivers some creeks also join Chaliyar from Neelithode, Poonkudi, Vadasseri, Edavanna, Kunduthodu and Mampad.

== See also ==
- Chaliyam
- Beypore
- Feroke
- Kadalundi Bird Sanctuary
