= Koodaranji =

- Town
- Location in Kerala, India
- Coordinates: 11°20′0″N 76°6′0″E
- Country: India
- State: Kerala
- District: Kozhikode

Population (2011)
  - Total: 18,678

Languages
  - Official: Malayalam, English
- Time zone: UTC+5:30 (IST)
- PIN: 673604
- Telephone code: 0495
- Vehicle registration: KL-
- Nearest city: Kozhikode
- Lok Sabha constituency: Wayanad
- Vidhan Sabha constituency: Thiruvambady
- Climate: good climate (Köppen)

Koodaranji is a hill Town in Kozhikode district in the state of Kerala, India.

== Demographics ==
As of 2011 India census, Koodaranji had a population of 18678 with 9242 males and 9436 females.
