= Malakkappara =

- Village
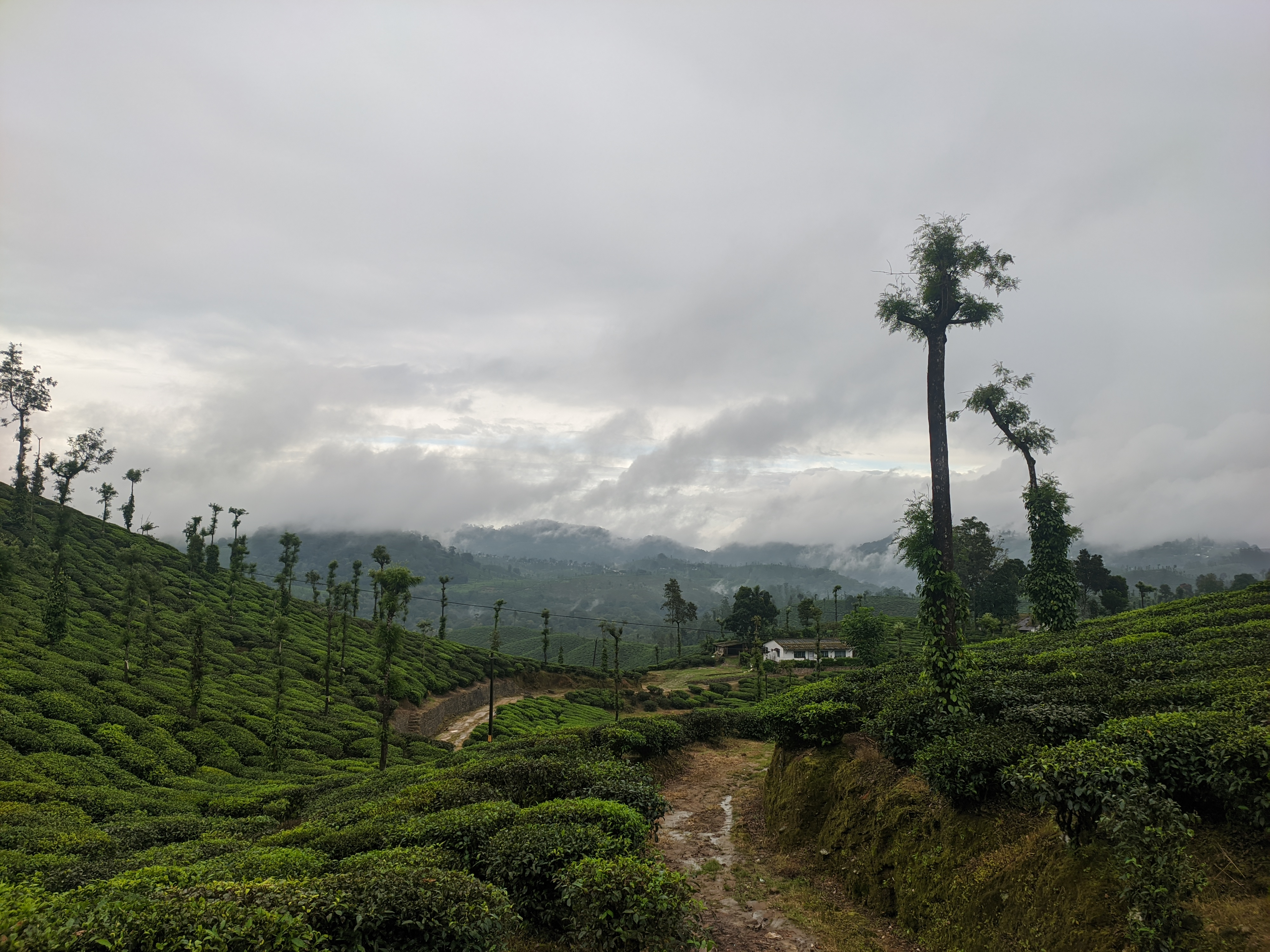
- Tea garden in Malakkappara
- Nickname: Angel Rock
- Location in Kerala, India Malakkappara (India)
- Coordinates: 10°16′40″N 76°51′15″E
- Country: India
- State: Kerala
- District: Thrissur

Government
  - Type: Panchayati Raj (India)
- Elevation: 948.64 m (3,112.3 ft)

Languages
  - Official: Malayalam, English
- Time zone: UTC+5:30 (IST)
- PIN: 680721
- Vehicle registration: KL-08, KL-64
- Nearest city: Chalakkudy, Pooyamkutty, Thrissur
- Nearest Railway Station: Chalakudy railway station

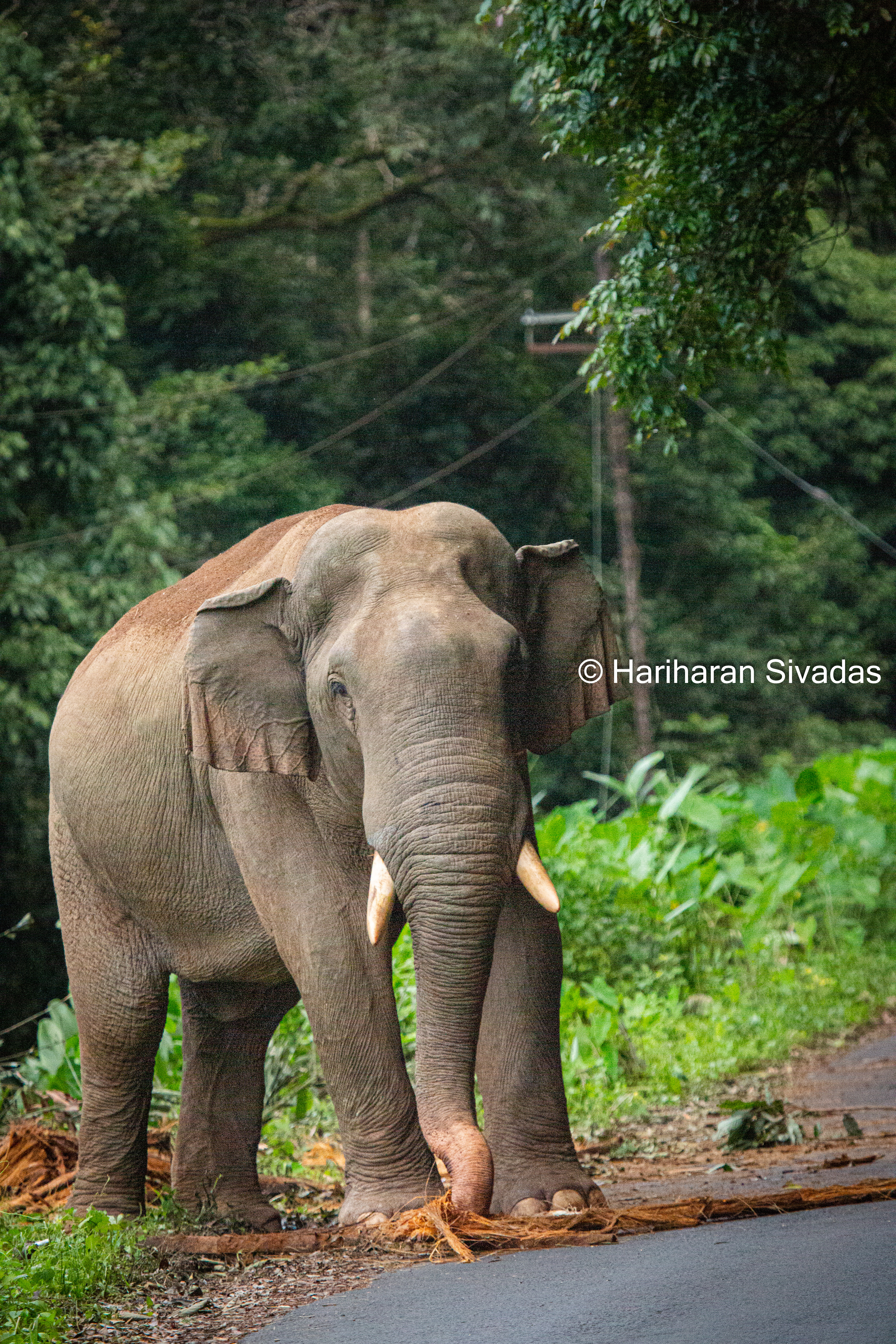
Kabali Elephant : Elephant roaming the forest area between Athrappilly-Vazhachal-Malakkappara sector

Malakkappara or Malakhappara is a plantation settlement located in the Thrissur district of the state of Kerala, India. This place is situated on the border between Kerala and Tamil Nadu.

== Etymology ==
The place gets its name from the Malayalam word Malakha-Para (മാലാഖപ്പാറ), meaning "Rock of the Angel", referring to a popular legend among Saint Thomas Christians of central Kerala.

== Geography ==
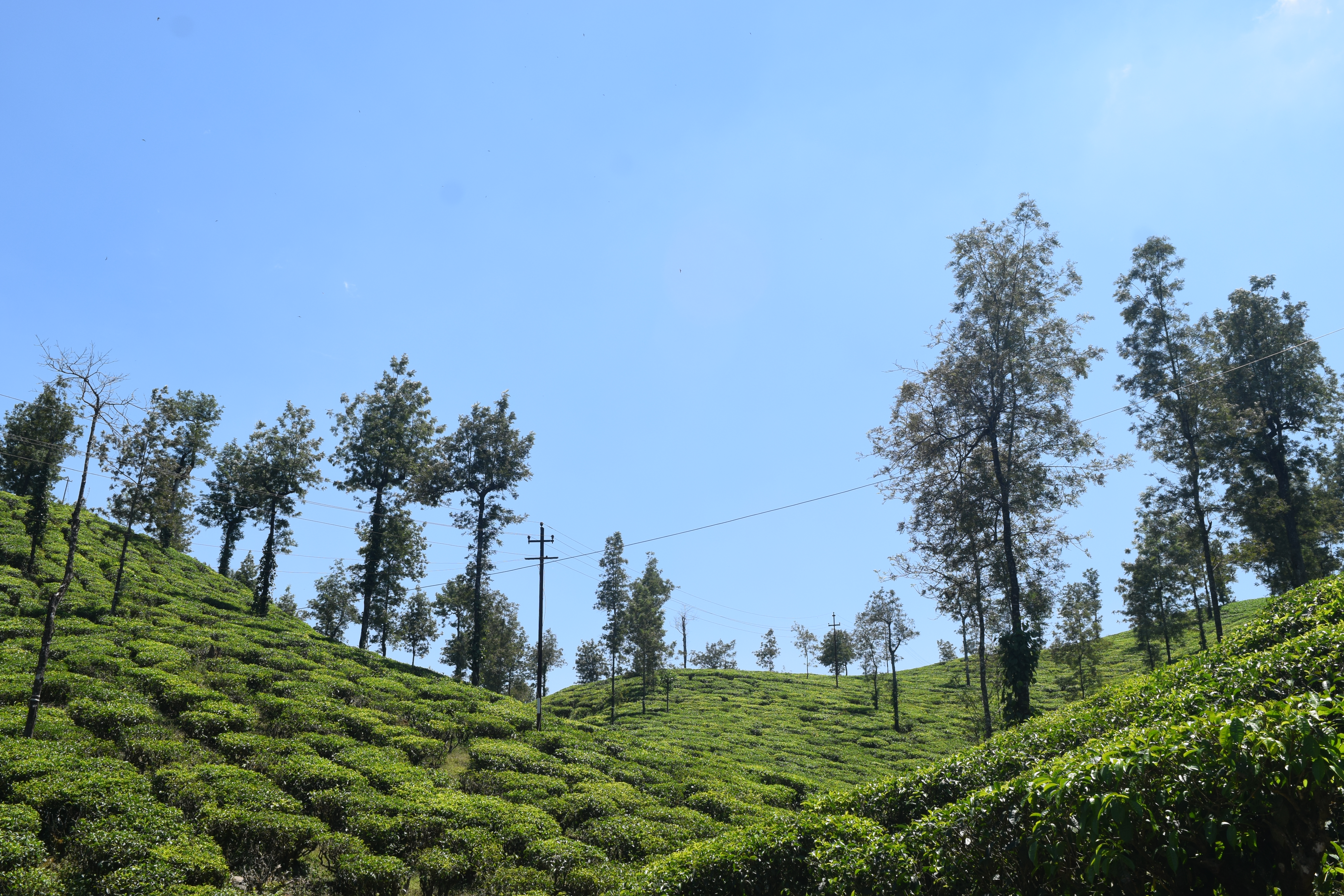
Tea Plantation at Malakkappara

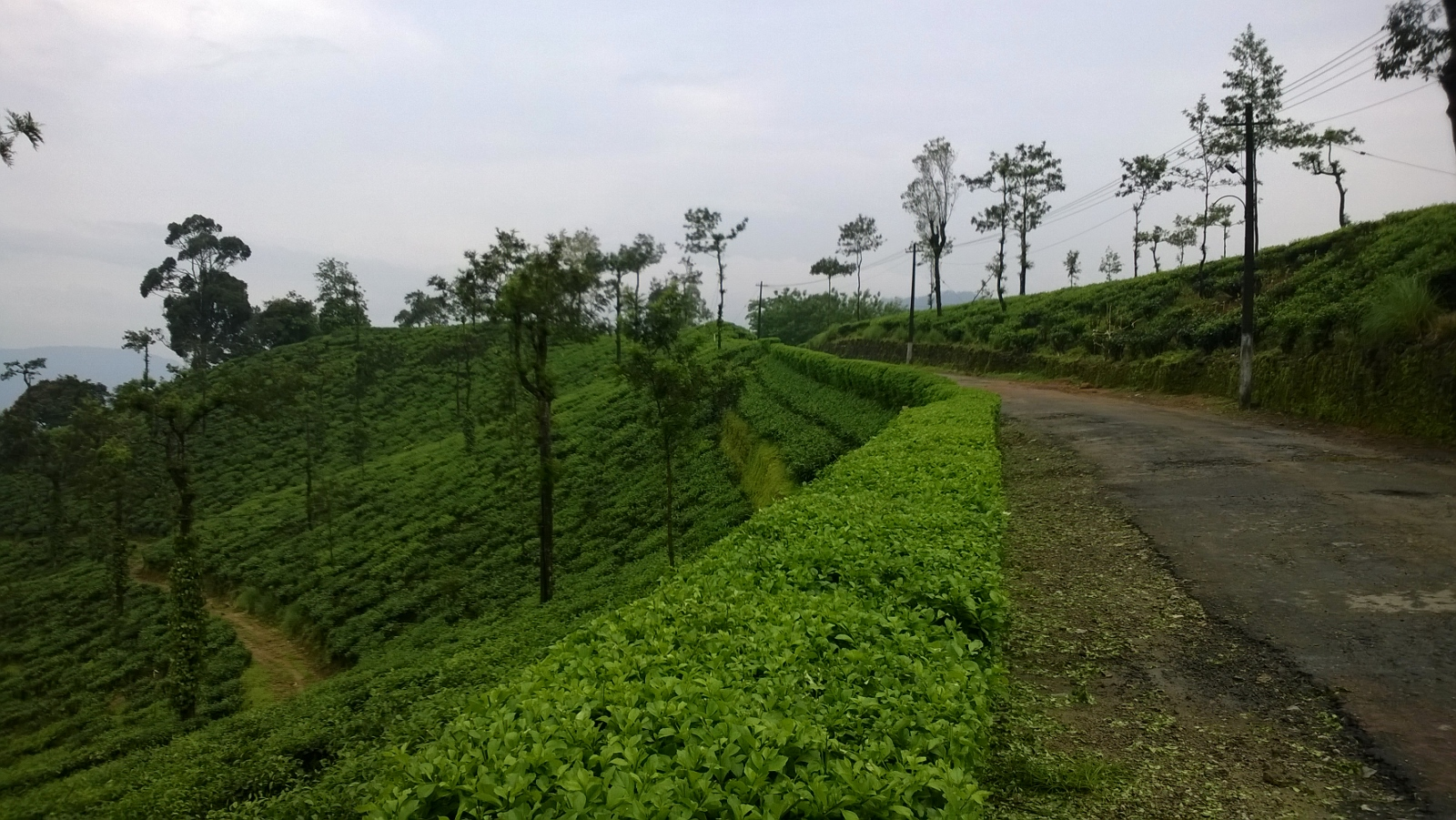
Malakkappara Road

The area consists of a tea estate owned by Tata Tea, forest area under the Kerala Forest Department belonging to both Vazhachal Forest Division and Malayattur Forest Division. Many endangered and endemic species of flora and fauna are found in the forests of Malakkappara area. It is situated at a distance of 86 km from Chalakudy along State Highway 21, passing through Thumboormuzhi, Athirappilly, Vazhachal, Sholayar. Malakkappara is 89 km away from Pollachi via Attakatti, Valparai, Solaiyar Dam etc. Sholayar Dam in Kerala is situated just 5 km (3.1 mi) away from Malakkappara.

== See also ==
- State Highway 21 (Kerala)
