= Sholayar Dam =

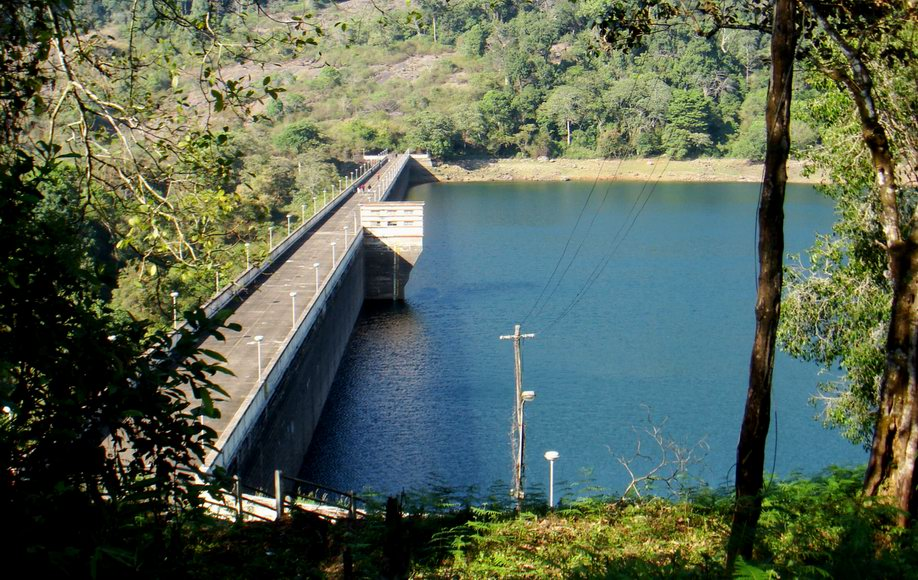
- Sholayar Dam
- Interactive map of Sholayar Dam
- Official name: Sholayar hydro electric project
- Location: Malakkappara, Thrissur India
- Coordinates: 10°19′18″N 76°44′07″E
- Purpose: Electricity
- Opening date: 1965
- Operator: KSEB

Dam and spillways
- Impounds: Sholayar Chalakkudy River
- Height: 56 m (184 ft)
- Length: 430.53 m (1,412 ft)
- Spillway capacity: 1825 M3/Sec

Reservoir
- Creates: Lower Sholayar Reservoir
- Total capacity: 153,600,000 cubic metres (5.42×10^{9} cu ft) (5.42 tmcft)
- Active capacity: 150,200,000 cubic metres (5.30×10^{9} cu ft) (5.31 tmcft)
- Surface area: 8.705 hectares (21.51 acres)

Power Station
- Operator: KSEB
- Commission date: 1961
- Turbines: 3 x 18 Megawatt (Francis-type)
- Installed capacity: 54 MW
- Annual generation: 233 MU

Sholayar Dam is a concrete dam built across the Chalakkudi River in Malakkappara in Thrissur district, Kerala of India. The dam consists of main Sholayar Dam, Sholayar Flanking and Sholayar Saddle Dam. It also contains Sholayar Hydro Electric Power Project of KSEB who owns the dam. Total installed capacity of the project is 54MW with 3 penstock pipes. The maximum storage capacity is 2663 feet. Sholayar is 65 km from Chalakudy town. The dam above Sholayar dam is Upper Solaiyar Dam owned by Tamil Nadu.

== History ==
Sholayar Dam, Sholayar Saddle Dam and Sholayar Flanking dam are commissioned in 1965. The reservoir has an area of 8.705 square km and the length of the dam is 430.60 metres. The Sholayar Dam has a height of 66 metres and 430 metres width, Sholayar Flanking Dam has a height of 18 metres from the foundation with 109 metres length and Sholayar Saddle has a height of 259 metres and 109 metres width.

== Gallery ==
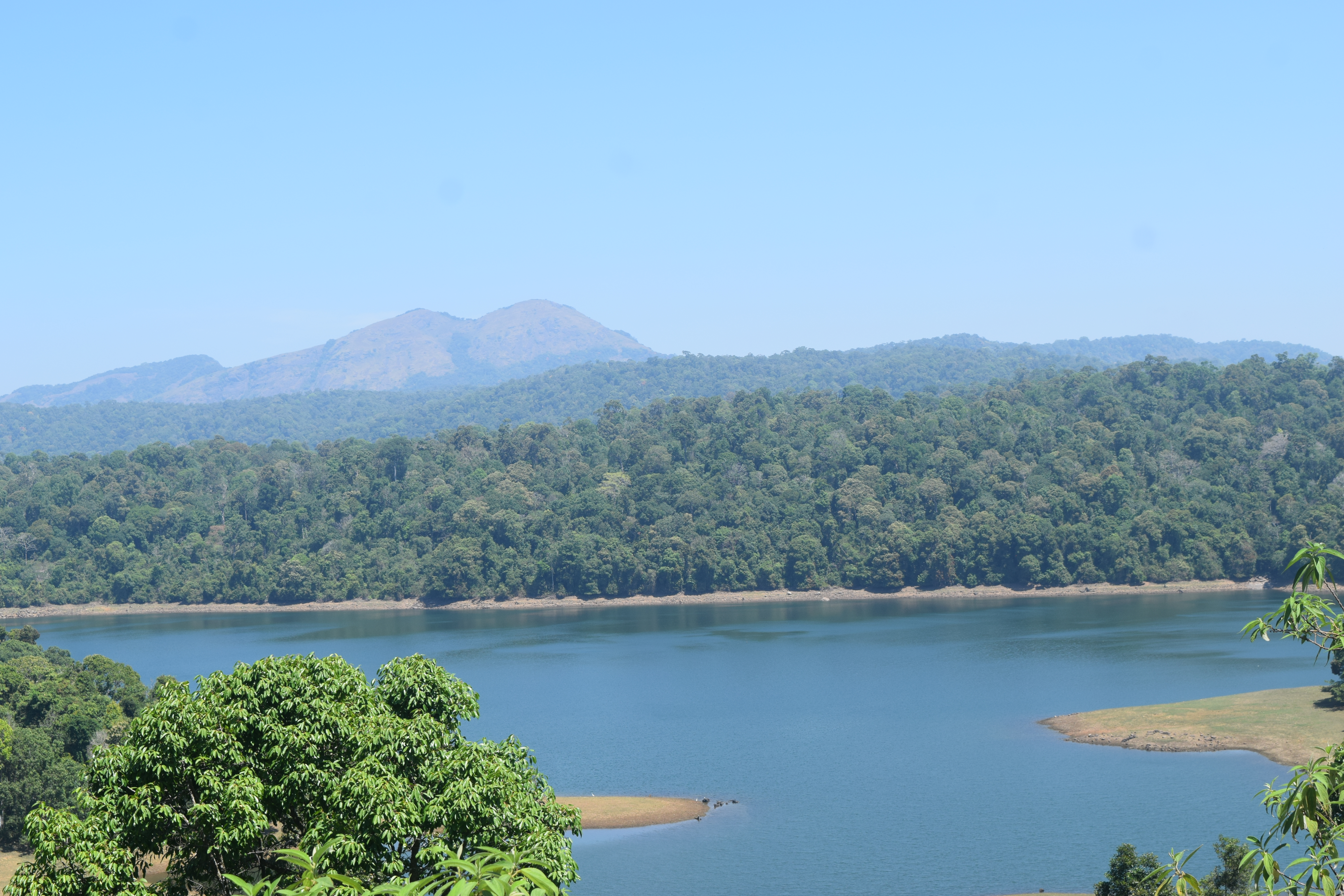
Sholayar Dam Reservoir

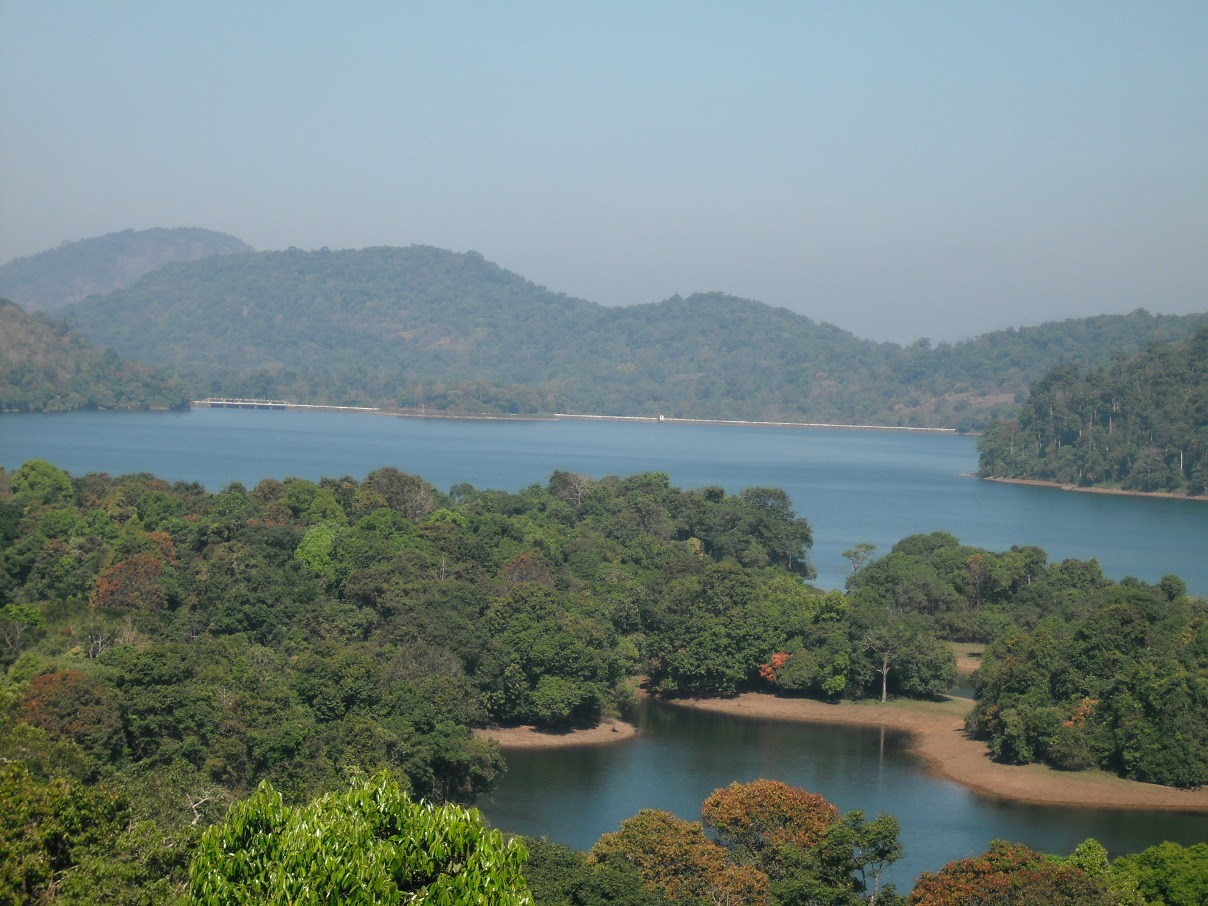
Sholayar Dam Reservoir and Dam

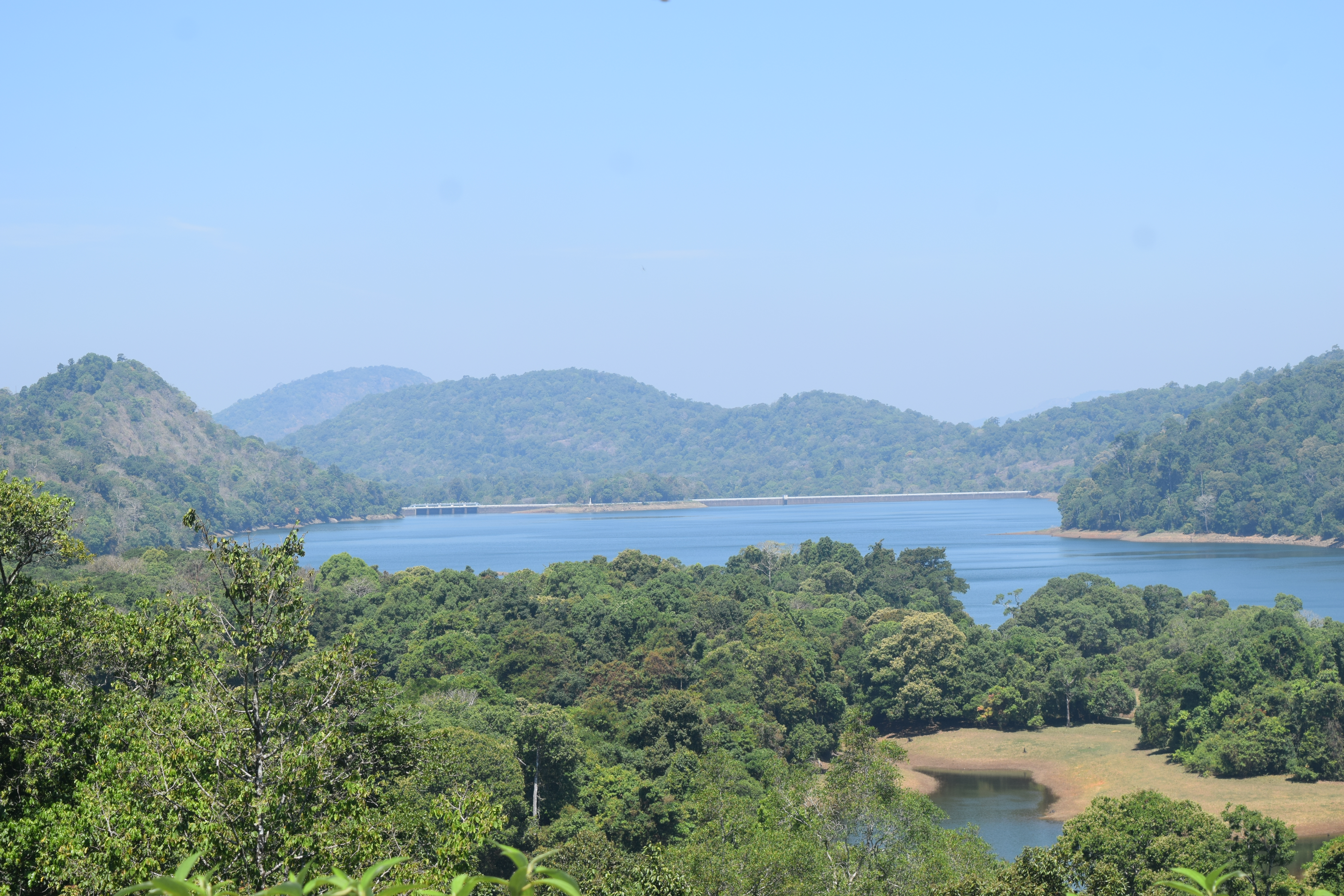
View of Reservoir

== See also ==
- List of reservoirs and dams in India
- Peringalkuthu Dam
- Athirappilly Falls
