= Monkey Falls =

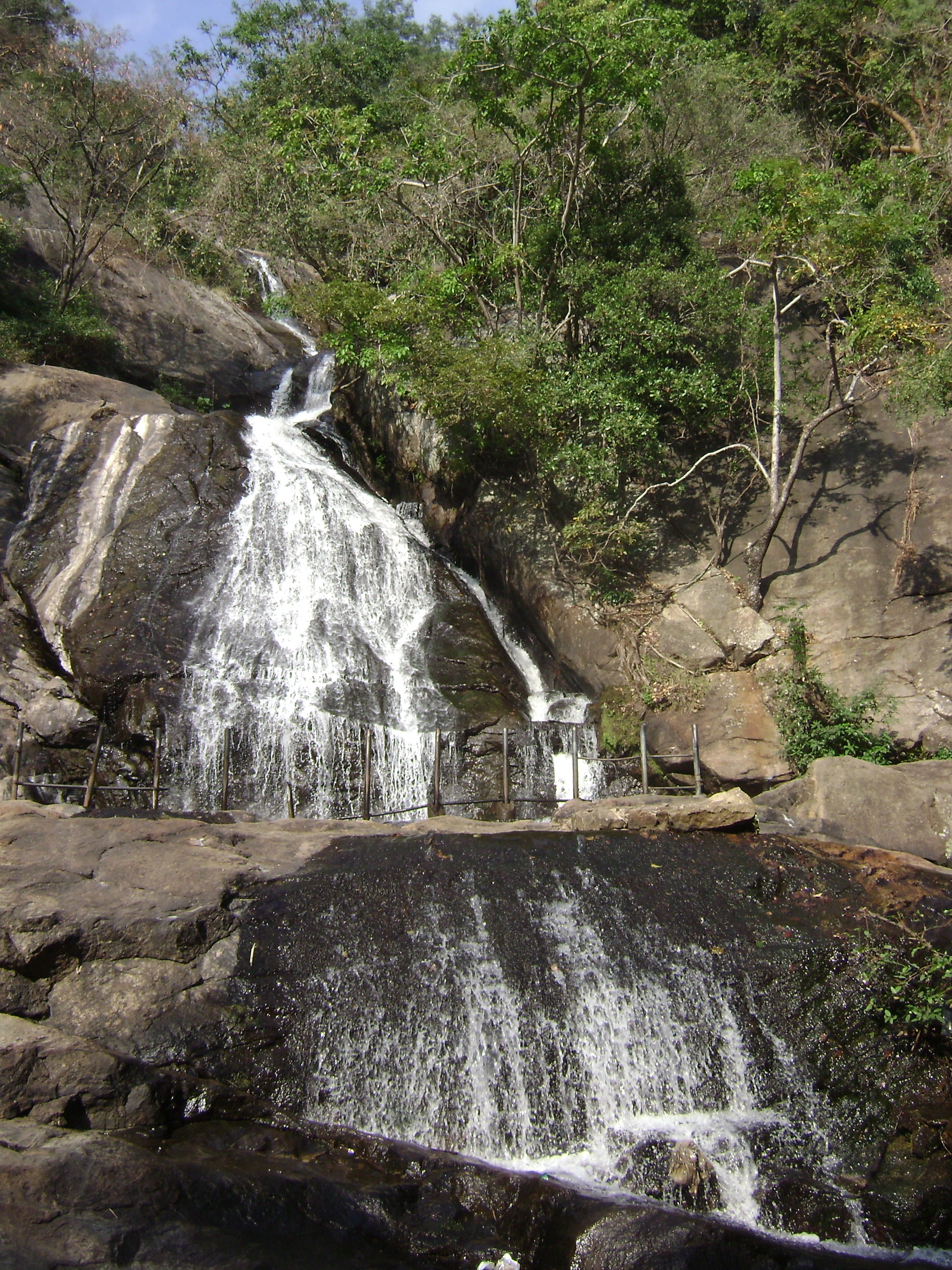
- Monkey Falls
- Interactive map of Monkey Falls
- Location: Indira Gandhi Wildlife Sanctuary and National Park, Upper Aliyar, Tamil Nadu

Monkey Falls are natural waterfalls located near the uphill ghat road Valparai on the Pollachi-Valparai road in the Anaimalai Hills range, in Coimbatore district.

Monkey Falls is about 30 km from Pollachi. Refreshing Natural Water Falls about 6 km from Azhiyar Dam. Monkey Falls is located on the road connecting Pollachi and Valparai.

== Getting there ==
An interesting trek route at the Monkey Falls; a linear stretch of evergreen forests surrounded by rocky cliffs, is available and regular guided treks are conducted during favourable season. Prior request should be given to the Tamil Nadu Forest Department headquarters at Pollachi before a fortnight.

The Monkey falls is a roadside stop situated 65 kilometers (40 mi) from Coimbatore and 29 kilometers (18 mi) from Pollachi on the Coimbatore - Pollachi - Valparai main road next to Arutperunjothi Nagar and Azhiyar Valparai Forest Department Check Post of IFS. Monkey Falls is a famous and popular tourism spot. Monkey falls is an ideal place for little children and adults to take a bath. Ticket fee is Rs 30 to enter inside the falls vicinity.

Precaution

In case if you parked the bike in roadside beware of Monkeys since it will open the tank cover and will take the things inside the tank cover. Also be careful near waterfall since in some place it will make you to slip and there is a chance of acquiring injury.

== See also ==
- List of waterfalls
- List of waterfalls in India
