= State Highway 78 (Tamil Nadu) =

Road in India

State Highway 78

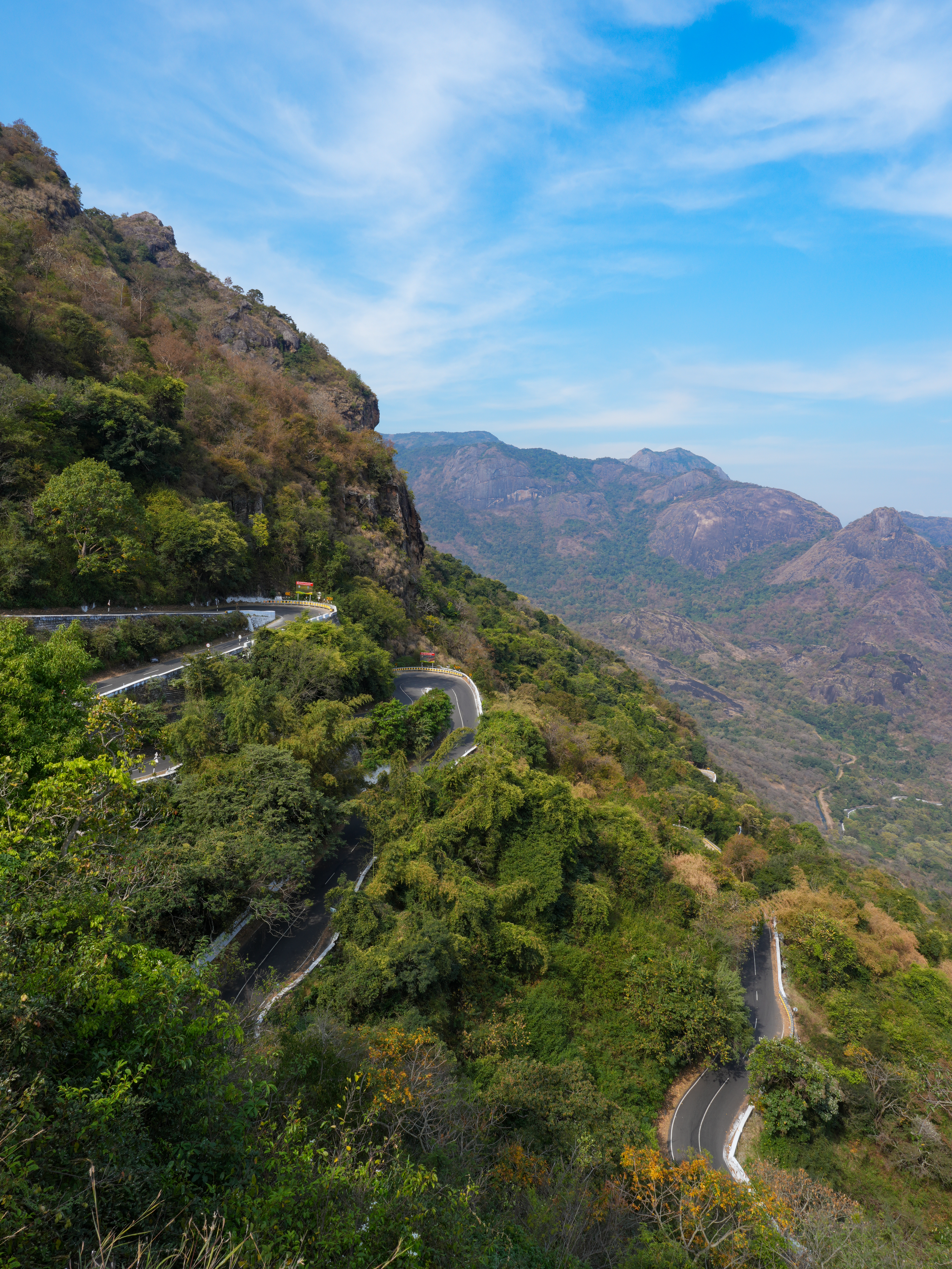

Route information
- Length: 64 km (40 mi)

Major junctions
- West end: Valparai
- East end: Pollachi

Location
- Country: India
- State: Tamil Nadu
- Districts: Coimbatore

Highway system
- Roads in India; Expressways; National; State; Asian; State Highways in Tamil Nadu

State Highway 78 (SH 78) or Valparai-Pollachi Road is a State Highway in Tamil Nadu, India that starts from Valparai and ends at Pollachi. The 64-kilometre (40 mi) highway is often described as one of the best scenic routes in South India. There are 42 hairpin bends on this road. Monkey waterfalls and Aliyar waterfalls are located on this route. It connects with Valparai-Chalakudy road, another scenic route in South India.

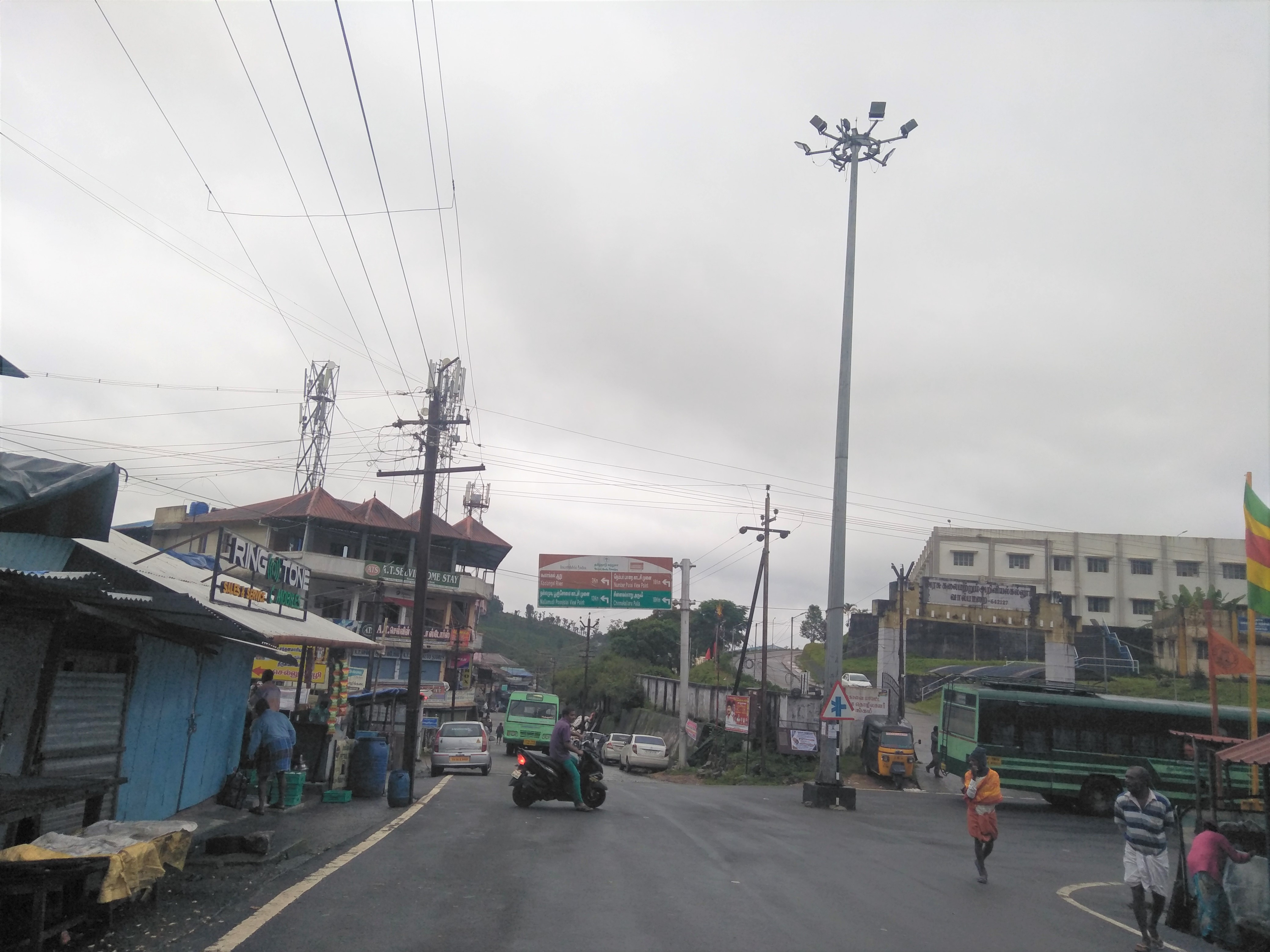
State Highway 78 runs through the centre of Valparai

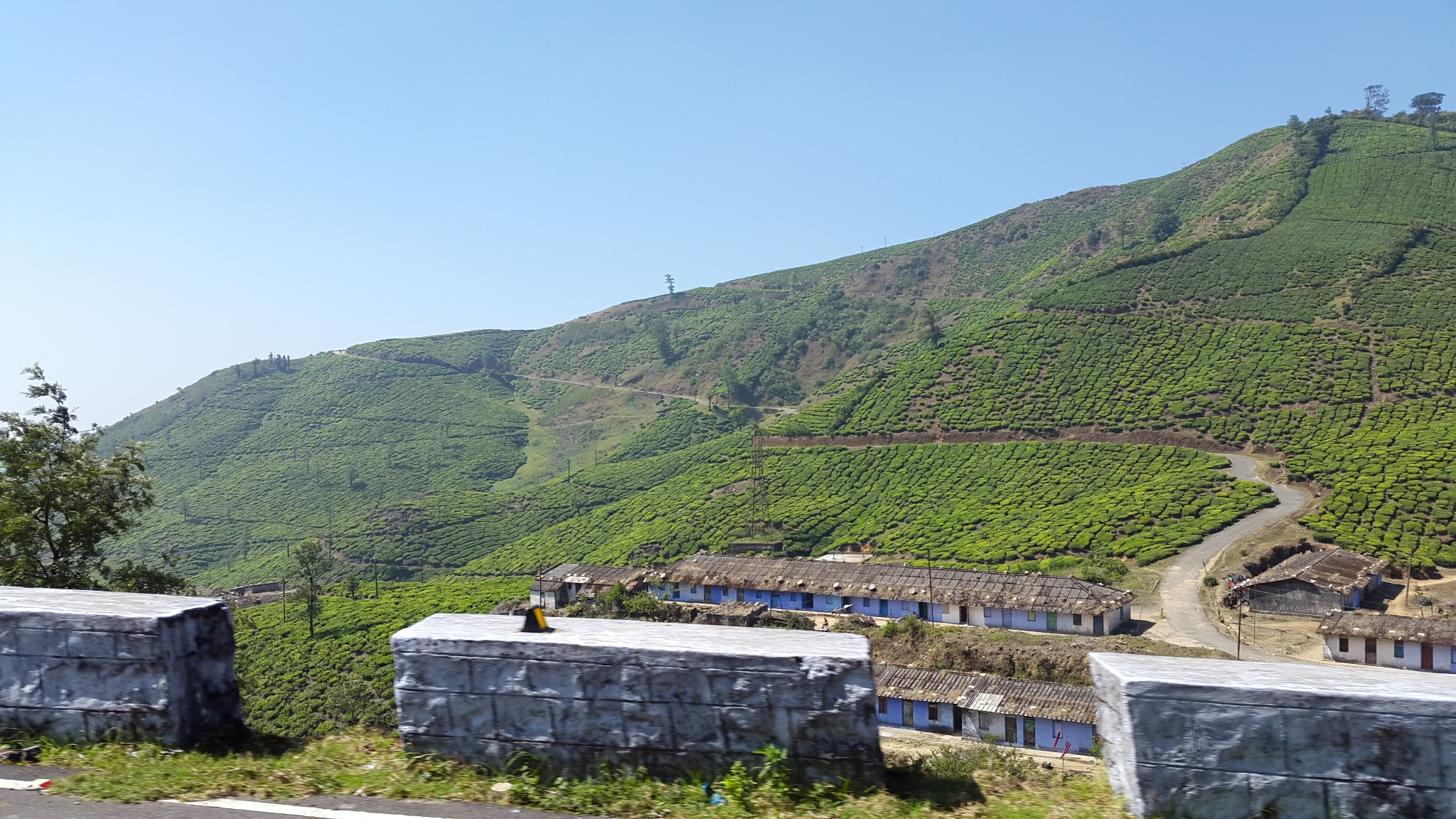
Viewed from SH 78

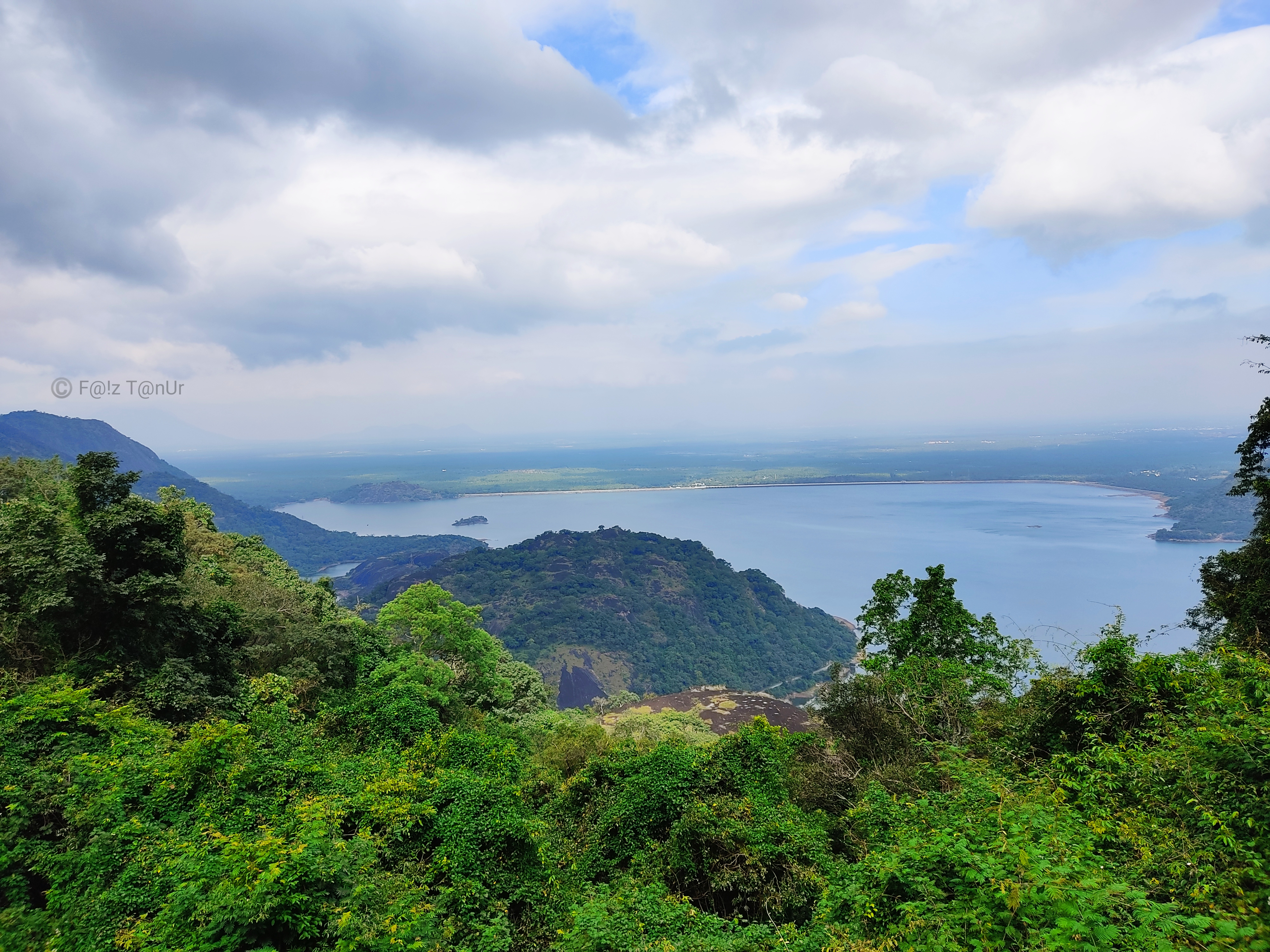
Viewed from SH 78

== See also ==
- State Highway 21 (Kerala)
