= Vadakkumkara (Mukundapuram, Thrissur) =

Coordinates: 10.31°N 76.20°E

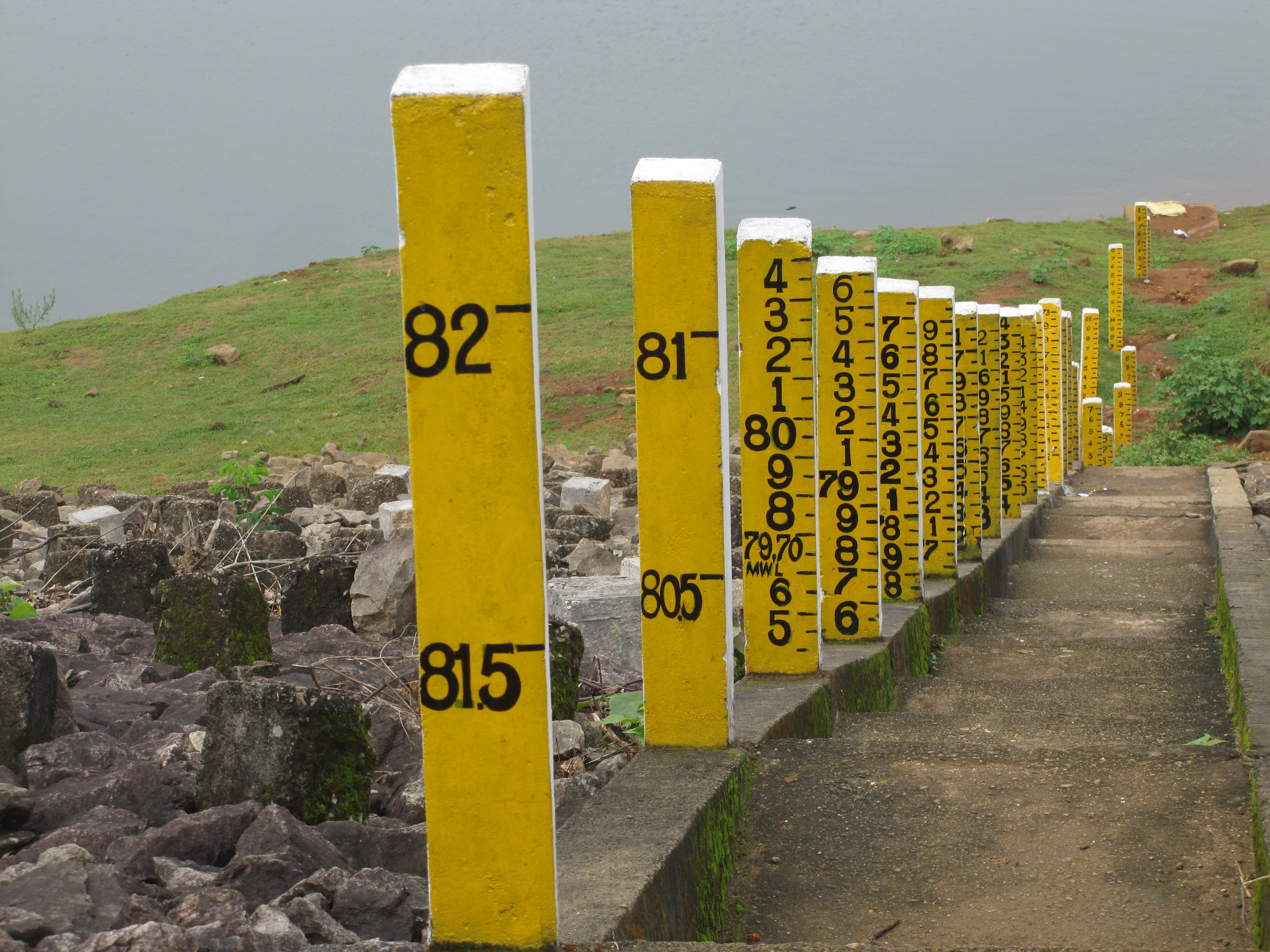
Chimmini Wildlife Sanctuary

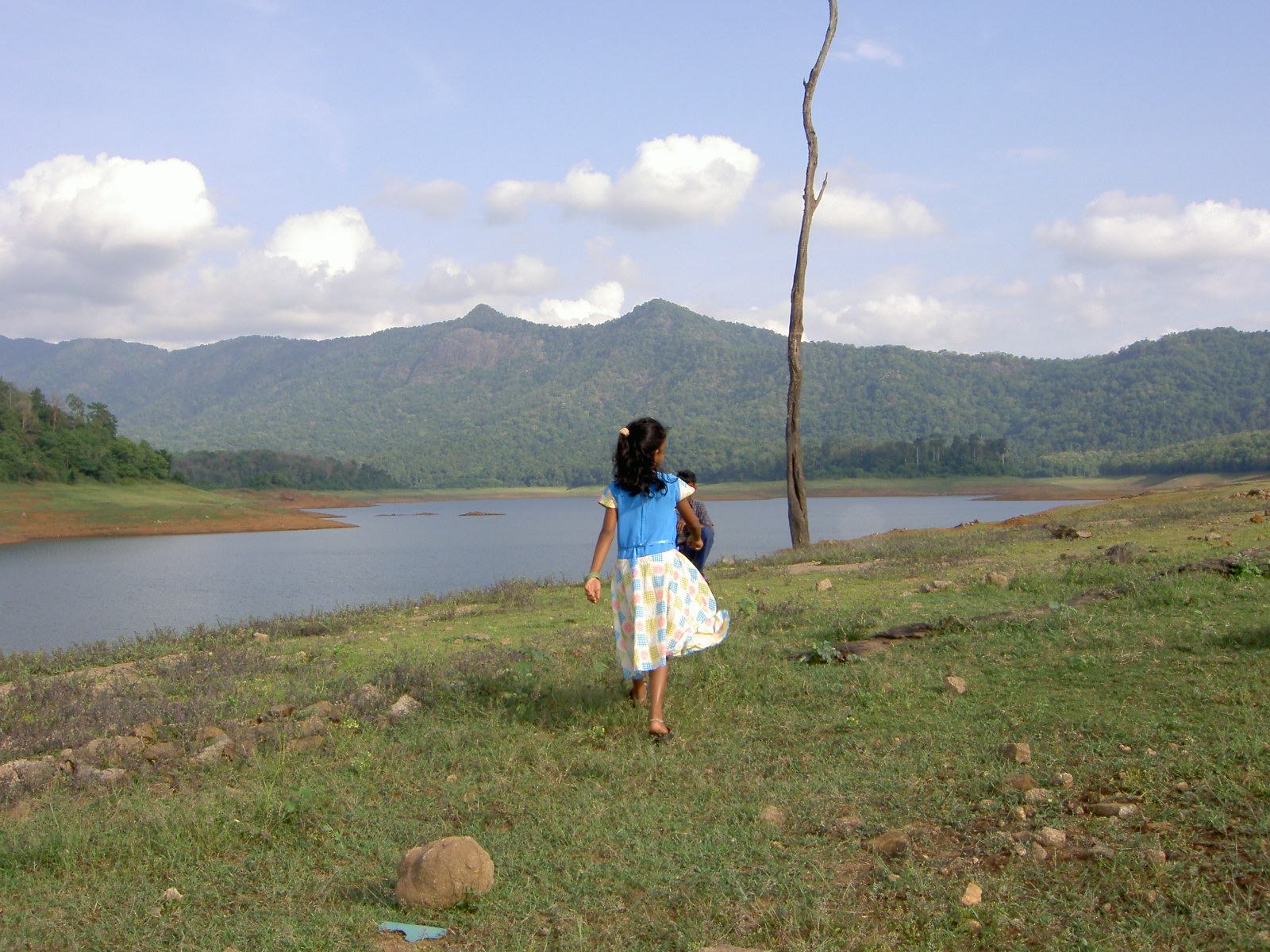
Chimmony Dam

Vadakkumkara is a village in the Mukundapuram taluka of the Thrissur district in the Indian state of Kerala, with an area of 605 hectares and harbouring 2,669 households with total population of 10,407 as per the 2011 Census. The population estimate for 2023 is c. 14,300. Male population is 4,862 and female population is 5,545. Scheduled Caste Population is 1126 and Scheduled Tribes population is 1. Census Location Code of the village is 627932.

The nearest town Chalakudy is at a distance of 15 km.

== Literacy ==
The literacy rate of Vadakkumkara city is with 95.71 % higher than the state average of 94.00 %. The male literacy is around 97.28 %, while female literacy rate is 94.37 %.

== Educational Facilities ==
The village has one private Pre-primary School, two government Primary Schools and one private Primary School. The village has one government Middle School, one private Middle School, one government Secondary School, one private Secondary School and one private Senior Secondary School. The nearest Degree College of Arts and Science and Commerce Irinjalakuda is at a distance of less than 4 km from the village. The nearest Engineering College is at a distance of 5 to km from the village. The nearest Medical College (Thrissur) is at a distance of 27 0 km from the village. The nearest Management Institute (Kuruvilassery) is at a distance of 15 km from the village. The nearest Polytechnic (Kallettumkara) is at a distance of 10 km from the village. The nearest Vocational Training School (Kuruvilassery) is at a distance of less than 15 km from the village. The nearest Non-formal Training Centre (Thrissur) is at a distance of more than 10 km from the village. The nearest Special School for Disabled is at a distance of 5 to 10 km from the village.

== Manufacturing ==
Vadakkumkara is engaged in the manufacture of following items (in decreasing order of importance): Paddy, Spices, arecanut.

== Sustainable development ==
A programme has been going on since August 2014 for the integrated eco-friendly sustainable development of the Vellangallur Panchayat by Salim Ali Foundation and the Vellangallur Panchayat with a partial grant from Manappuram Foundation.
