= Ashtamichira =

- village
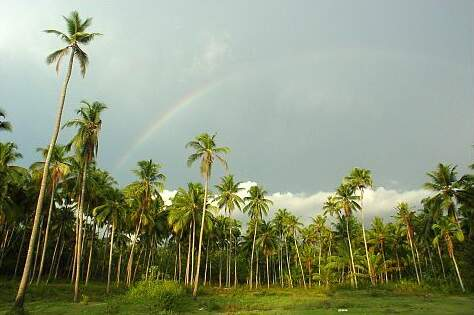
- A rainbow over coconut trees in a field in Ashtamichira

- Location in Kerala, India Ashtamichira (India)
- Coordinates: 10°16′17″N 76°16′46″E
- Country: India
- State: Kerala
- District: Thrissur
- Taluka: Mukundapuram
- Panchayat: Mala

Languages
  - Official: Malayalam, English
- Time zone: UTC+5:30 (IST)
- PIN: 680 731
- Telephone code: 0480 289
- Vehicle registration: KL- 64
- Nearest city: Chalakudy
- Lok Sabha constituency: Chalakudy

Ashtamichira is a village in Thrissur district in the Indian state of Kerala.

The vast paddy fields and coconut groves that surround Ashtamichira represent the core strength of the area, which is agriculture. Ashtamichira has historically been an agrarian community, but the economic growth of India in the past decade has started to show its effect in the community's shift away from agriculture.

== Geography and demographics ==
The closest major cities are Chalakudy, Thrissur, and Cochin.

=== Location ===
- 33 km (21 mi) south west of Thrissur
- 55 km (34 mi) north of Cochin
- 10 km (6.2 mi) west of Chalakudy
- 4 km (2.5 mi) north of Mala
- 18 km (11 mi) south east of Irinjalakuda
- 15 km (9.3 mi) south east of Kodungallur - The historical place, former kingdom and historical port (mussris).

=== Demographics ===
- Population -
- Language - Malayalam
- Religions - Hinduism, Christianity, Islam

=== Transport infrastructure ===
==== By Road ====
Ashtamichira lies 10 km (6.2 mi) west of the national highway NH-47.

=== By Rail ===
The nearest railway stations are Irinjalakuda and Chalakudy, both are 8 km (5.0 mi) away. Chalakudy is served by all major trains running through Kerala and is the best access to Ashtamichira for long-distance travelers.

==== By Air ====
The nearest airport is Cochin International Airport (COK), which is about 25 km (16 mi) away.

== Places of worship ==
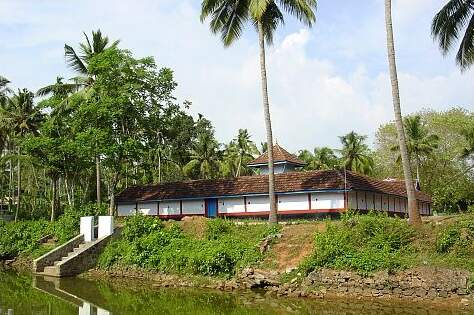
Ashtamichira Mahadeva Kshetram with its ambalakkulam in the foreground.

Nearest places of worship are:

- Temples
  - Ashtamichira Mahadeva Kshetram
  - Urundolil Sree Bhagavathy Kshetram
  - Pambumekkatu Mana
  - Chakkamparambu Kshetram
  - Kannankattil Kshetram
  - Maniyankavu Kshetram
- Mosques
  - Kattikarakunnu Juma Masjid
  - Ashtamichira east Juma Masjid
  - Umer Farooq Juma Masjid & Hilaliya Madrassa, Marekkad
- Churches
  - Assemblies of God Church, Ashtamchira.
  - India Pentecostal Church of God, Ashtamchira.
  - St. Thomas Forane Church, Ambazhakadu
  - St. Antonys Church, Puliyilakunnu
