= Solaiyar Dam =

Dam in Tamil Nadu, India

Coordinates: 10°19′17″N 076°44′07″E

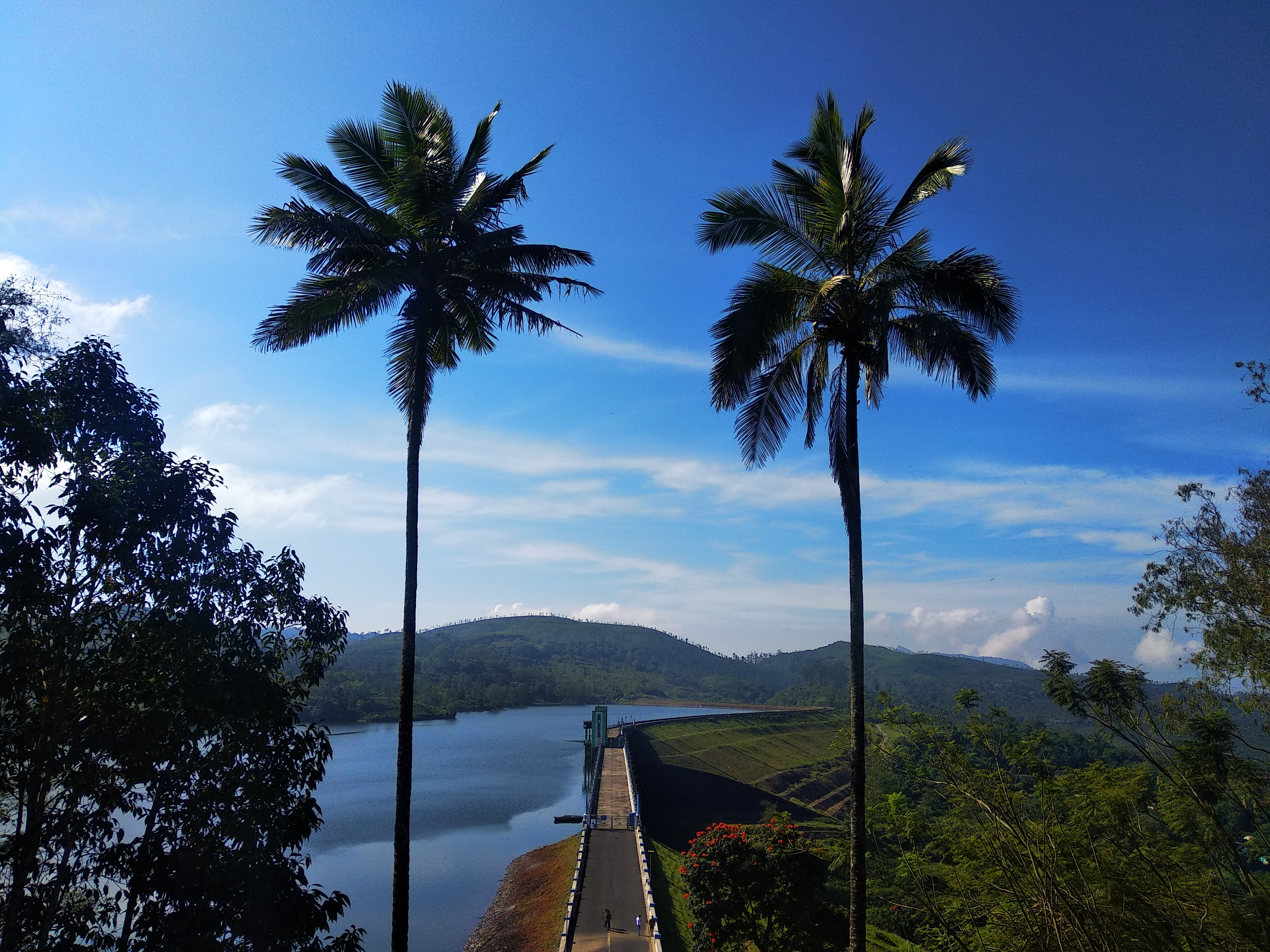
- Solaiyar Dam
- Official name: Solaiyar Dam
- Country: India
- Location: Valparai, Tamil Nadu
- Opening date: 1965

Dam and spillways
- Impounds: Chalakkudi River
- Height (foundation): 66 metre
- Length: 430.6 m (1,413 ft)

Reservoir
- Creates: Chalakkudi River
- Total capacity: 153.60 million cubic metre (5.42 tmcft)
- Active capacity: 150.20 million cubic metre (5.31 tmcft)

Solaiyar Power House
- Operator: Tamil Nadu Green Energy Corporation Limited
- Commission date: Unit 1: 22 April 1971; Unit 2: 04 May 1971; Unit 3: 29 March 1971
- Turbines: 2 X 35 MW; 1 X 25 MW
- Installed capacity: 120 MW

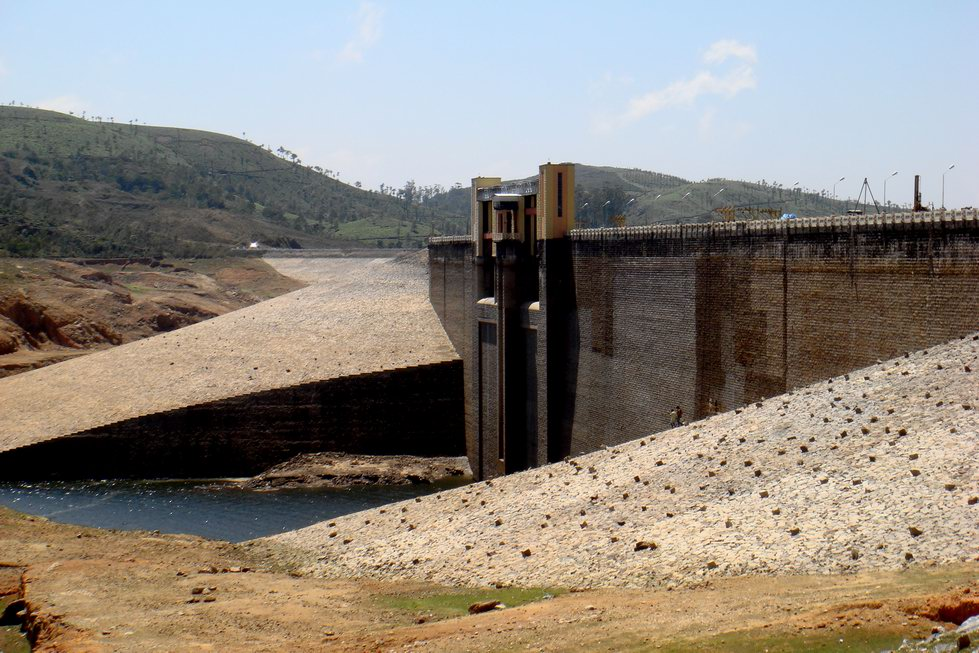
Solaiyar Dam during early Summer

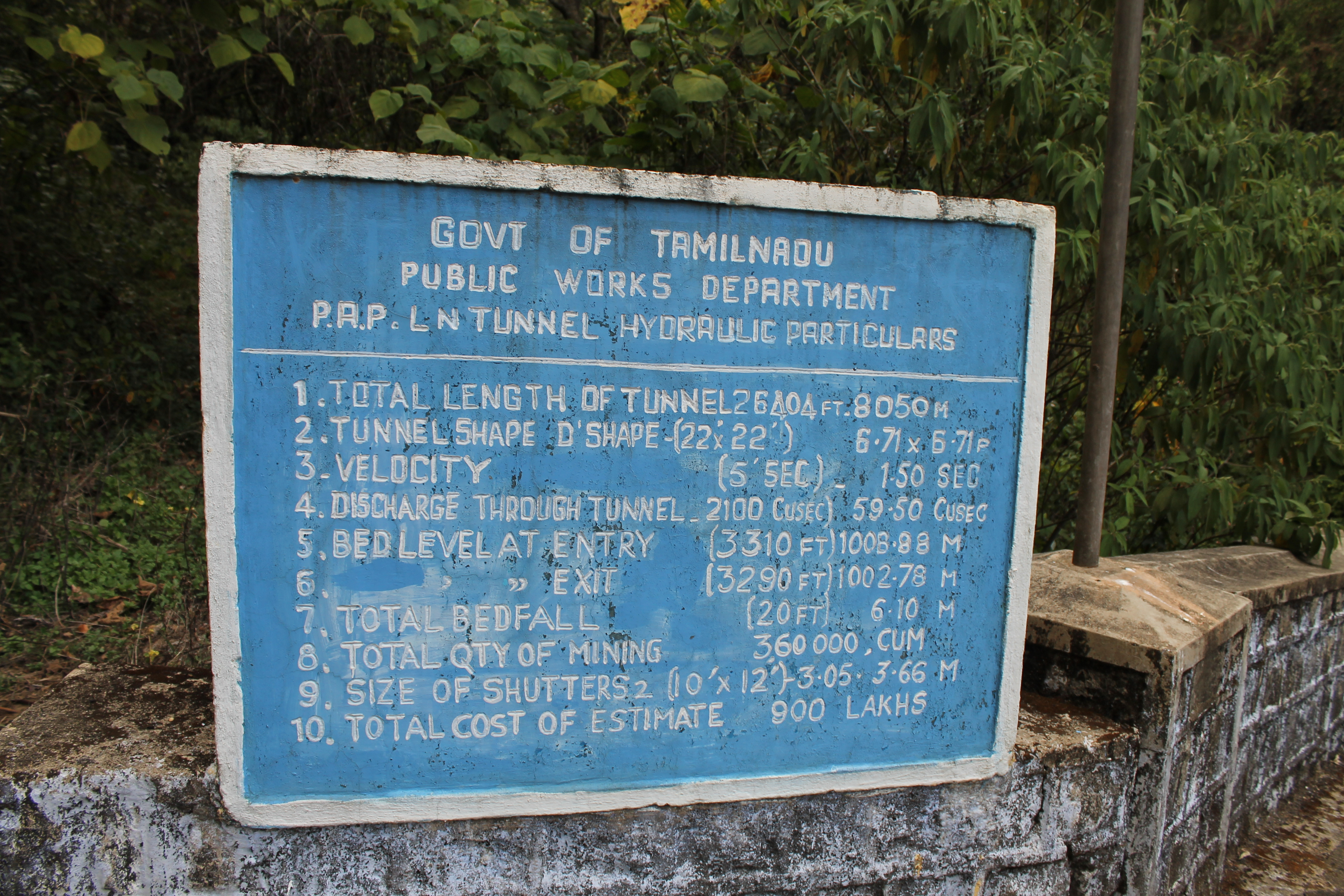
Information about tunnel at Solaiyar Dam, Tamil Nadu

Solaiyar Dam, Upper Solaiyar Dam or Upper Sholayar Dam (Solaiyaaru) is located 20 km (12 mi) from Valparai, a hill station in the Anaimalai Hills of the Coimbatore district, Tamil Nadu India. As it is a part of the hydroelectric project of Tamil Nadu, special permission is required to visit the dam.

Valparai is located 64 km (40 mi) from Pollachi and 104 km (65 mi) from Chalakudy, Kerala. The nearest railway station is Pollachi.

The reservoir of Solaiyar dam is a vital reservoir under the Parambikulam Aliyar Project and has a water storage capacity of 160 ft (49 m). The reservoir's overflowing waters are let into the Parambikulam Reservoir through the saddle dam.

It was constructed by a team working under K. Gopalswamy Mudhaliar, the most popular engineer in that area.

The Solaiyar Dam is part of the Solaiyar Hydroelectric Project (HEP). The project comprises the main Soliayar Dam, the Solaiyar Flanking Dam, and the Solaiyar Saddle Dam.

== History ==
Solaiyar Dam was officially opened in 1965; the Solaiyar Flanking was built in 1964 and the Solaiyar Saddle Dam in 1965.

== Construction ==
The area of the reservoir is 8.705 square km. The height of the main dam is 66 metres, its width is 430 metres, and length 430.60 metres. The Solaiyar Flanking has a height of 28 metres and width of 19 metres. The Solaiyar Saddle Dam is 259 metres high and 109 metres wide.

== See also ==
- List of dams and reservoirs in India
- Aliyar Reservoir
