= State Highway 21 (Kerala) =

Highway in Kerala, India

State Highway 21
- Chalakudy-Malakkappara Road
- SH 21 highlighted in red
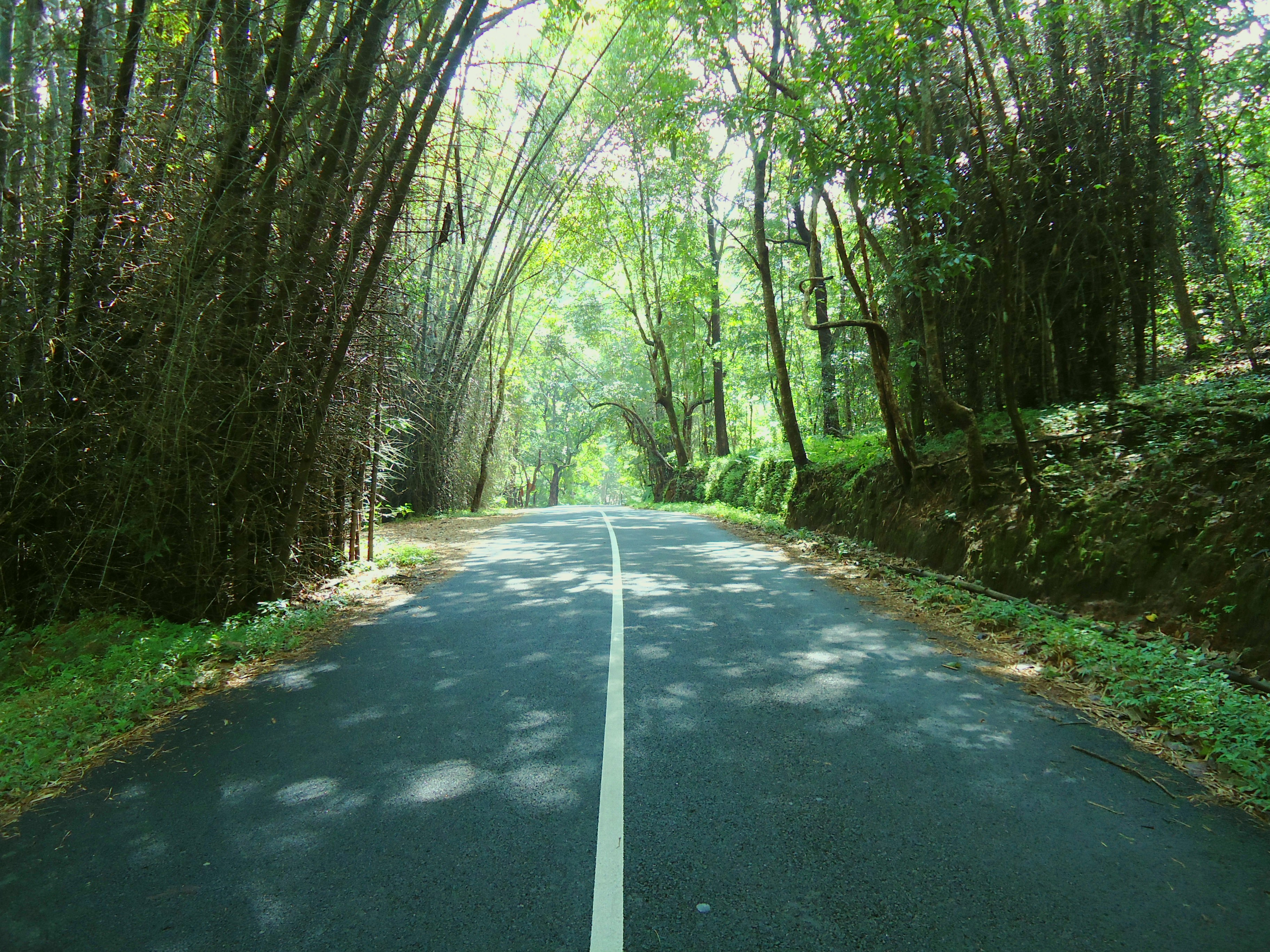
- Chalakudy-Vazhachal stretch on the road

Route information
- Maintained by Kerala Public Works Department
- Length: 86 km (53 mi)

Major junctions
- West end: NH 544 in Chalakkudy
- East end: MDR-354 at Tamil Nadu border in Malakkappara

Location
- Country: India
- State: Kerala
- Districts: Thrissur, Palakkad

Highway system
- Roads in India; Expressways; National; State; Asian; State Highways in Kerala
← SH 19	→ SH 22

State Highway 21 (SH 21) or Chalakkudy-Malakkappara Road is a State Highway in Kerala, India that starts in Chalakudy and ends at the state boundary with Tamil Nadu at Malakkappara. The road where its majority of portion passes through Sholayar reservoir is 86.0 kilometres (53.4 mi) long. It passes through one of the most picturesque rainforests and is often described as one of the best scenic routes in India. The Athirappilly falls and Vazhachal falls are located on this route. It connects with Valparai-Pollachi Road in Tamil Nadu.

== Route description ==
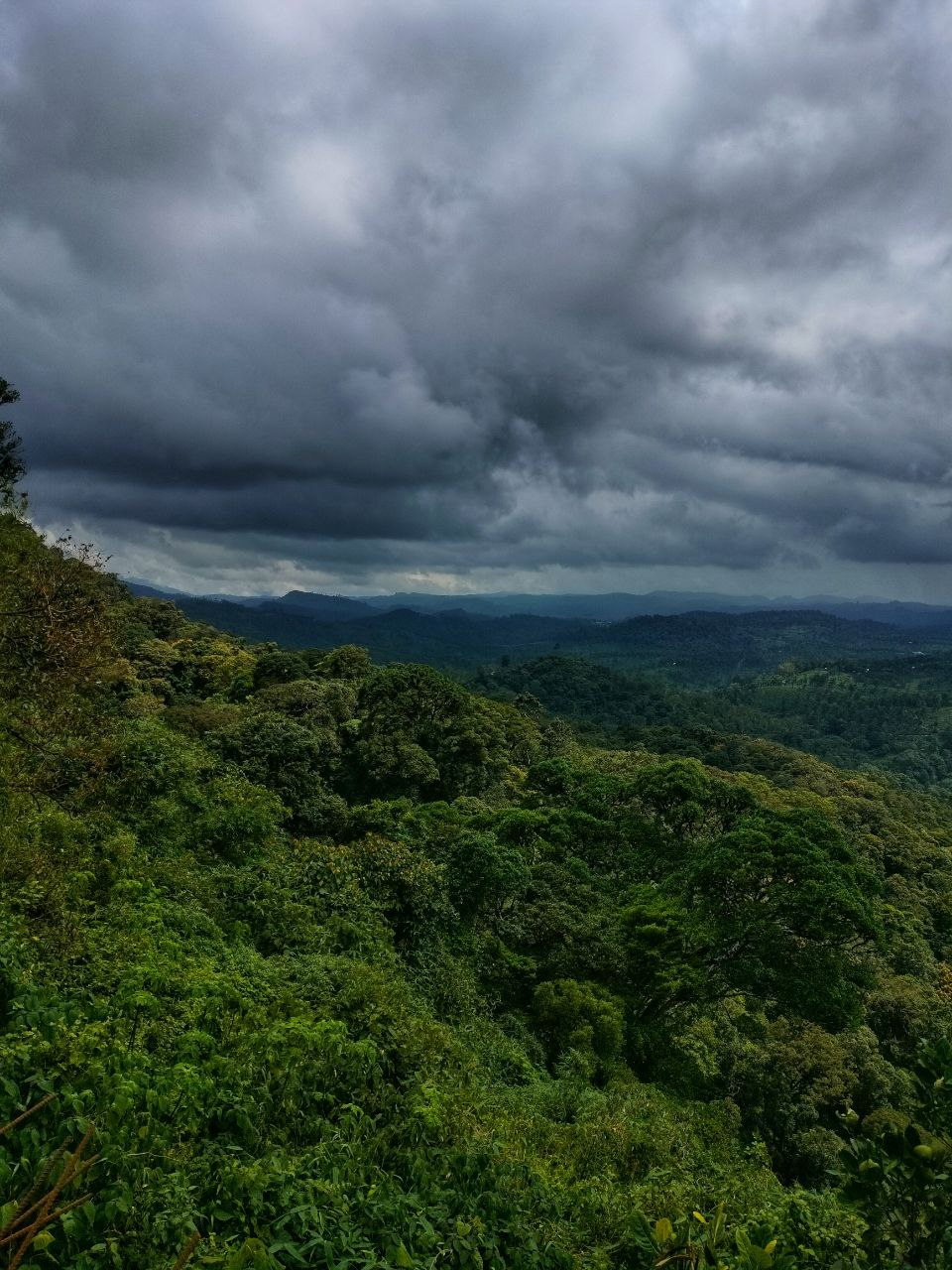
A view of Sholayar reserve forest from a viewpoint on the road

The road begins from Chalakudy in Thrissur district where it meets the NH 544. It then enters the Athirappilly stretch, goes through Vettilapara and reaches Athirappilly Water Falls. It then goes to the Vazhachal-Malakkappara stretch from a forest checkpost located at Vazhachal, 4 km from Athirappilly. From here, the vehicles are allowed only from 6 am to 6 pm (6 am - 4 pm for two wheelers). The road then reaches the Malakkappara checkpost near the Tamil Nadu border. It ends near Malakkappara and the Valparai-Pollachi road starts a few distance from there.

The Vazhachal-Malakkappara stretch is situated on the banks of the Chalakudy river. The area is covered with thick forest and unauthorised entry into the forest is prohibited and punishable as per Kerala Wildlife Protection Act. Charpa waterfalls viewpoint, Peringalkuthu dam reservoir viewpoint, Anakkayam bridge, Sholayar hydro power station and Nellikunnu viewpoint are located on this stretch. The human habitation on the area is limited to some isolated tribal hamlets.
