= Kodassery =

- village
- Location in Kerala, India Kodassery (India)
- Coordinates: 10°20′35″N 76°23′35″E
- Country: India
- State: Kerala
- District: Thrissur district

Government
  - Type: Panchayati raj (India)
  - Body: Gram panchayat

Population (2011)
  - Total: 12,575

Languages
  - Official: Malayalam, English
- Time zone: UTC+5:30 (IST)
- PIN: 680721,680724
- Vehicle registration: KL-64

Kodassery is a village in Thrissur district in the state of Kerala, India.

== Demographics ==
As of 2011 India census, Kodassery had a population of 12,575, with 5,970 males and 6,605 females. Kodassery village in Kerala is the only village in India where 100% reservation has been given to women in gram panchayats.

Kodassery is a Gram Panchayat village in Thrissur district, Kerala, located near Chalakudy and spanning 4,063 hectares of varied terrain including hills, valleys, and riverine plains shaped by tributaries of the Chalakudy River. As of the 2011 Census, the village had a population of 12,575, with 5,970 males and 6,605 females, and a gender ratio of 11 females per 10 males. Kodassery is notable for being the only village in India with 100% reservation for women in gram panchayats, a unique milestone in local governance and gender representation. The region is characterized by lush greenery, nearby Kodassery Hills, and a canal network that supports agriculture, though monsoon seasons can cause erosion in the low-lying areas.

Historically, Kodassery played a significant role in regional development through the forest tramway system established during the reign of the Kings of Cochin. This tramway transported timber and firewood from the eastern hills to Chalakudy and contributed greatly to the area’s prosperity before it was dismantled due to vested interests, causing long-term economic loss. The panchayat itself was formed in 1962 by merging Elinjipra and Kodassery villages, later expanding to include Kuttichira. Today, Kodassery remains a vibrant rural community with bus connectivity, nearby railway access at Chalakudy, local schools, health facilities, and active civic institutions that manage water supply, sanitation, and infrastructure under Kerala’s three-tier Panchayati Raj system.
