= Valparai =

- Town
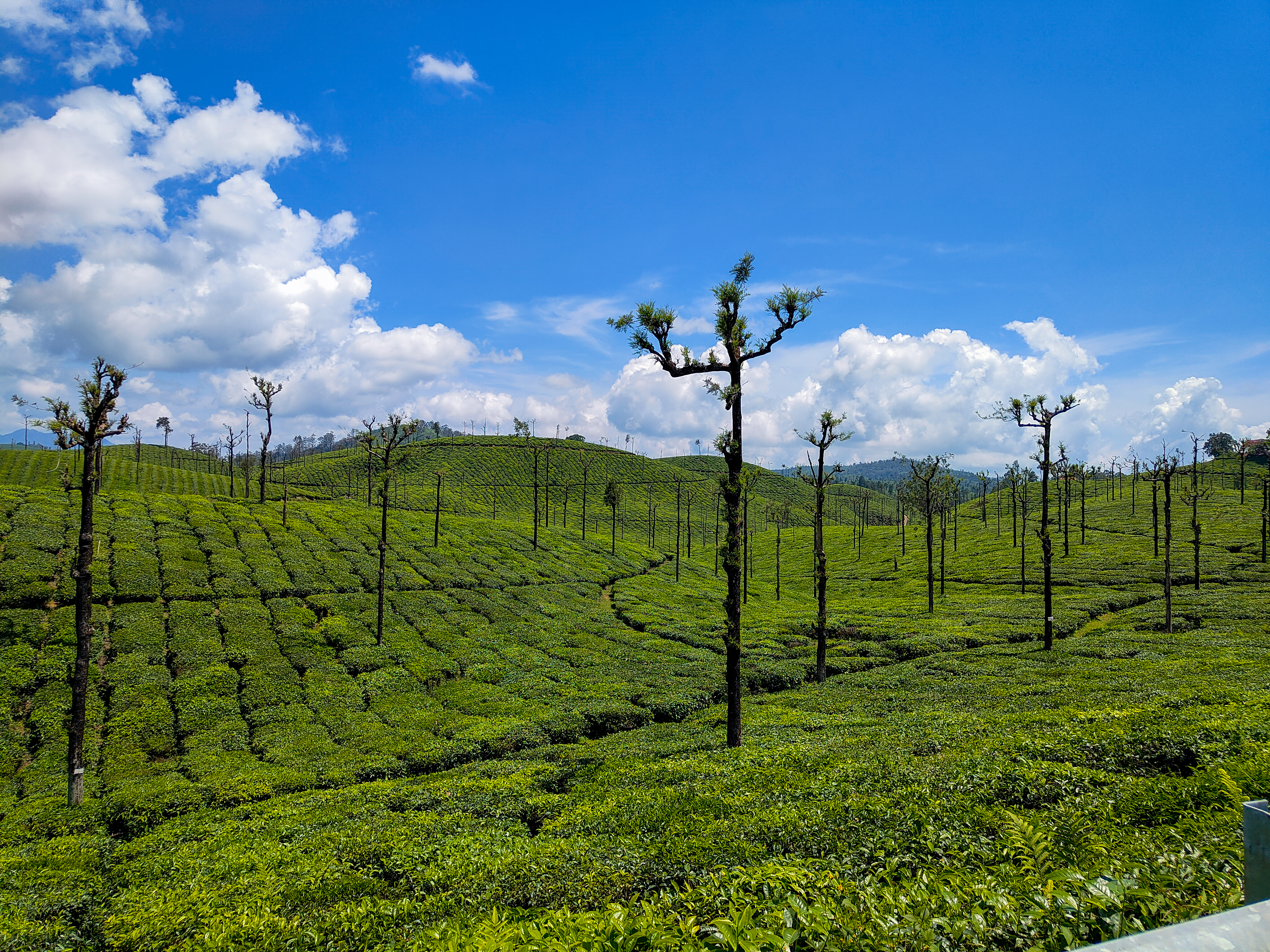
- Tea plantations in Valparai

- Location in Tamil Nadu, India
- Coordinates: 10.327556°N 76.955271°E
- Country: India
- State: Tamil Nadu
- District: Coimbatore

Government
  - Type: Municipality
  - Body: Valparai Municipality
  - Municipal Chairman: Mrs. S.Alagusundaravalli
  - Municipality Commissioner: Mr. K. Balu
- Elevation: 1,059 m (3,474 ft)

Population (2011)
  - Total: 70,589

Languages
  - Official: Tamil
- Time zone: UTC+5:30 (IST)
- PIN: 642127
- Telephone code: 04253
- Vehicle registration: TN 41

Valparai (originally known as Poonachimalai) is a Town and hill station in the Coimbatore district of Tamil Nadu, India. It consists of Anamalai Tiger Reserve (earlier known as Indira Gandhi Wildlife Sanctuary and National Park (IGWLS&NP) and prior to that as Anaimalai Wildlife Sanctuary). It is located 3,474 feet (1,059 m) above sea level on the Anaimalai Hills range of the Western Ghats. There are a total of 56 estates here. The game of football is very popular here. State level competitions are held every year. The foothill starts exactly from Monkey Falls which is at a distance of 38 kilometres (24 mi) to Valparai. The route to Valparai from the foothills consists of 40 hairpin bends. The Kerala state border town of Malakkappara is at a distance of 27 kilometres from Valparai. While major portions of the land are owned by private tea companies, large forest areas continue to be out of bounds.

== History ==
Earliest records of this area are from the year 1846 when K. Ramasamy Mudaliyar started a coffee plantation here. In 1864, the Karnatic Coffee Company began their coffee plantation here but they could not make it profitable, hence they sold part of their land. In 1875, the roads and guest houses were built by soldiers for the visit of England's Prince of Wales, the future Edward VII. Soldiers were posted here and horses and elephants were used for this purpose. However, the visit was eventually cancelled. In 1890, W. Wintil and Nordan bought a huge portion of land in Valparai from the Madras State Government under the British Raj. Wintil deforested the area and planted tea and coffee. He was assisted by G. A. Carver Marsh, an experienced planter for a salary of 250 rupees. Valparai receives rainfall throughout the year. The typical temperature range in Valparai is 25 °C (max) to 15 °C (min) in summer and (and 15 °C (max) to 10 °C (min) in winter.

== Geography ==
Valparai is located at 10.37°N 76.97°E. It is a mid-elevation hill station (Ootacamund is considerably higher) and has an average elevation of 3,914 feet (1,193 m). It is close to the border with Thrissur district of the Kerala state.

=== Climate ===
Valparai has a mild tropical monsoon climate (Am) with a short dry season and a long rainy season. It is one of the wettest places in Tamil Nadu.

Climate data for Valparai, India (1991-2020)
Month	Jan	Feb	Mar	Apr	May	Jun	Jul	Aug	Sep	Oct	Nov	Dec	Year
Mean daily maximum °C (°F)	27.6 (81.7)	29.0 (84.2)	28.9 (84.0)	28.4 (83.1)	27.2 (81.0)	23.8 (74.8)	22.7 (72.9)	23.1 (73.6)	24.4 (75.9)	25.6 (78.1)	26.0 (78.8)	26.5 (79.7)	26.0 (78.8)
Daily mean °C (°F)	18.9 (66.0)	20.1 (68.2)	21.5 (70.7)	22.5 (72.5)	22.4 (72.3)	20.8 (69.4)	20.2 (68.4)	20.3 (68.5)	20.8 (69.4)	21.1 (70.0)	20.5 (68.9)	19.6 (67.3)	20.7 (69.3)
Mean daily minimum °C (°F)	10.2 (50.4)	11.3 (52.3)	14.1 (57.4)	16.5 (61.7)	17.6 (63.7)	17.9 (64.2)	17.7 (63.9)	17.5 (63.5)	17.2 (63.0)	16.6 (61.9)	15.0 (59.0)	12.7 (54.9)	15.5 (59.9)
Average rainfall mm (inches)	10.2 (0.40)	14.7 (0.58)	94.9 (3.74)	135.0 (5.31)	232.9 (9.17)	672.5 (26.48)	801.1 (31.54)	690.6 (27.19)	418.2 (16.46)	299.6 (11.80)	136.6 (5.38)	31.7 (1.25)	3,537.9 (139.29)
Average rainy days	0.8	1.1	5.2	7.4	10.9	23.5	25.7	22.1	18.0	15.1	8.3	2.6	140.8
Average relative humidity (%) (at 17:30 IST)	66	63	70	80	85	89	90	90	88	86	83	77	81
Source: India Meteorological Department

== Demographics ==
Religious census
Religion	Percent(%)
Hindu	82.84%
Christian	13.51%
Muslim	3.47%
Other	0.18%

According to the 2011 census, Valparai had a population of 70,859 with a sex-ratio of 1,013 females for every 1,000 males, much above the national average of 929. A total of 5,007 were under the age of six, constituting 2,564 males and 2,443 females. Scheduled Castes and Scheduled Tribes accounted for 59.68% and 1.75% of the population respectively. The average literacy of the town was 78.47%, compared to the national average of 72.99%. The town had a total of 19,017 households. There were a total of 38,440 workers, comprising 107 cultivators, 4,828 main agricultural laborers, 173 in household industries, 29,338 other workers, 3,994 marginal workers, 71 marginal cultivators, 341 marginal agricultural laborers, 62 marginal workers in household industries and 3,520 other marginal workers. As per the religious census of 2011, Valparai had 82.84% Hindus, 13.51% Christians, 3.47% Muslims, 0.02% Sikhs, 0.01% Buddhists, and 0.15% following other religions.

== Economy ==
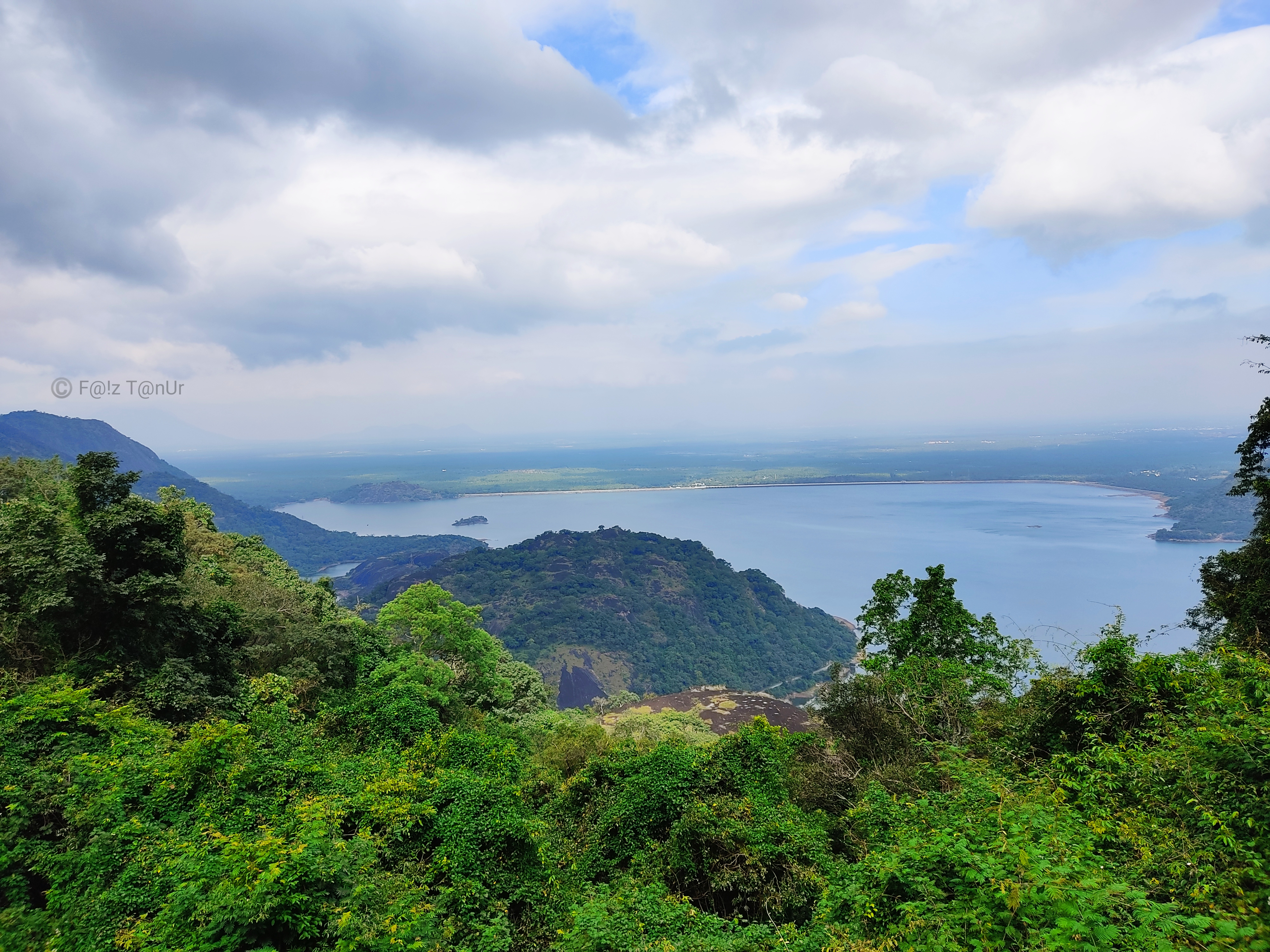
Aliyar Dam Reservoir view from 14th hairpin bend

The economy of Valparai largely depends on plantation crops. Valparai has a high concentration of tea and coffee estates. Most of the people living here work in these estates. To encourage tourism, the Government of Tamil Nadu in collaboration with ITDC initiated the construction of private resort hotels and parks to attract tourists.

Valparai is surrounded by many dams and hydro electric power plants. Aliyar Dam is at the foothill of this cluster of mountains. As we go up Upper Aliyar dam is located off the road (which branches off from the main road to Valparai) to Kadampaarai. In Kadamparai there is Kadamparai Dam and beneath the mountain a special kind of power station of TNEB (now TANGEDCO) is located. The road to this Kadamparai Pumped Storage Hydro Electric Power Station branches some 2 miles before and goes through a tunnel which ends up in the vast underground power station complex. The water from the dam flows through one of the dual penstocks and after rotating the turbine it is pumped up to the dam with a powerful motor through the other penstock. Lower Neeraar Dam and Upper Neeraar Vier are located beyond Kadamparai near Kerala border. The Government of Tamil Nadu Chinchona estate and factory are located on the road to Neeraar dam. Chinchona is used in the medicine to cure malaria.

Sholayaar Dam is located on the western side near Kerala border. It has one power house at the bottom of the dam and the second power house is located few miles away at Manompolli. The water which rotates the turbines goes through the forests in to Parambikulam Dam in Kerala. This water is brought back from Kerala to Tamil Nadu via a tunnel and then the Contour Canal (சமமட்டக் கால்வாய்) which ends up in Upper Aazhiyaar dam.

== Transport ==
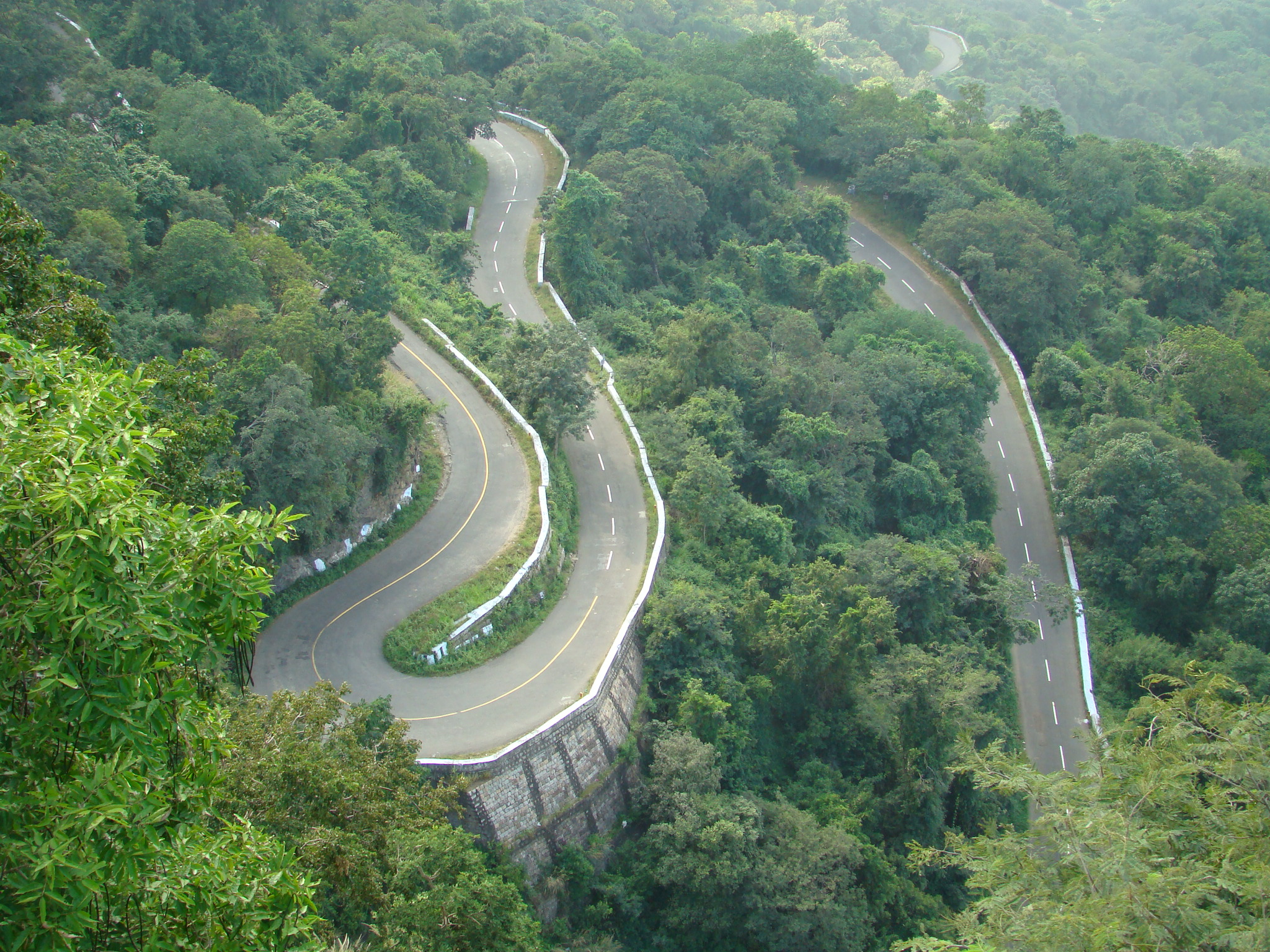
Winding ghat roads at Valparai

Valparai is at a distance of 64 kilometres (40 mi) from Pollachi; 80 kilometres (50 mi) from Udumalaipettai;110 kilometres (68 mi) from Coimbatore;115 kilometres (71 mi) from Dharapuram; 130 kilometres (81 mi) from Tiruppur; 154 kilometres (96 mi) from Munnar; 107 kilometres (66 mi) from Chalakudy; 129 kilometres (80 mi) from Nelliampathi; 110 kilometres (68 mi) from Palakkad; 153 kilometres (95 mi) from Thrissur.The road from Pollachi to Valparai has 40 hairpin bends. It takes about 2 hours to reach Valparai from Pollachi on State Highway 78. TNSTC operates buses from Valparai to Pollachi, Salem, Coimbatore, Tiruppur, Udumalaipettai, Dharapuram and Palani. Valparai is connected to Athirappilly Falls by road and is 107 km from Valparai to Chalakudi. It was 597 kilometres from Chennai to Valparai (by making halt in coimbatore).

== Politics ==
The Valparai Assembly constituency is a Scheduled Caste reserved legislative assembly constituency and forms part of Pollachi Lok Sabha constituency.

== Wildlife ==
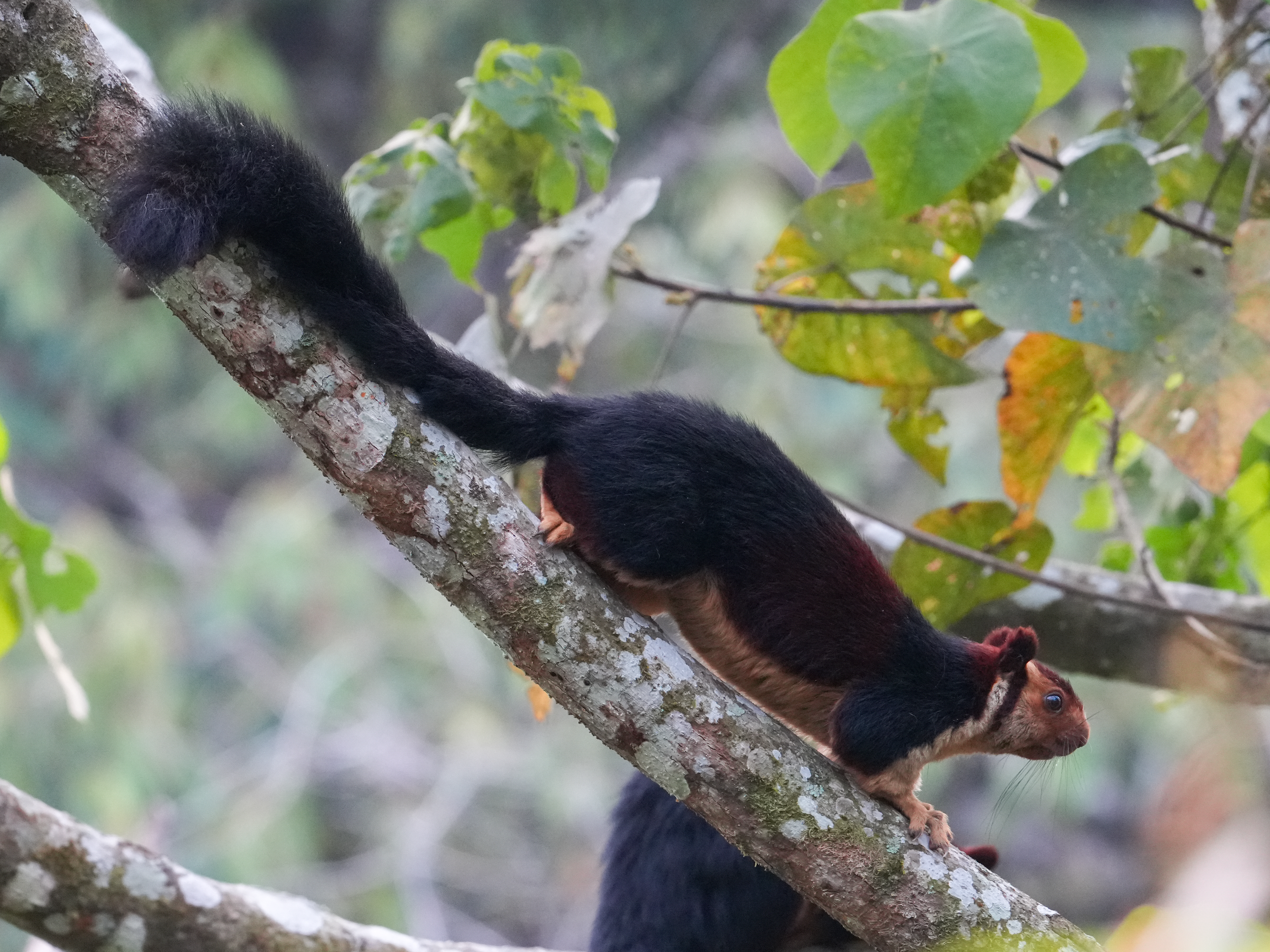
Malabar giant squirrel

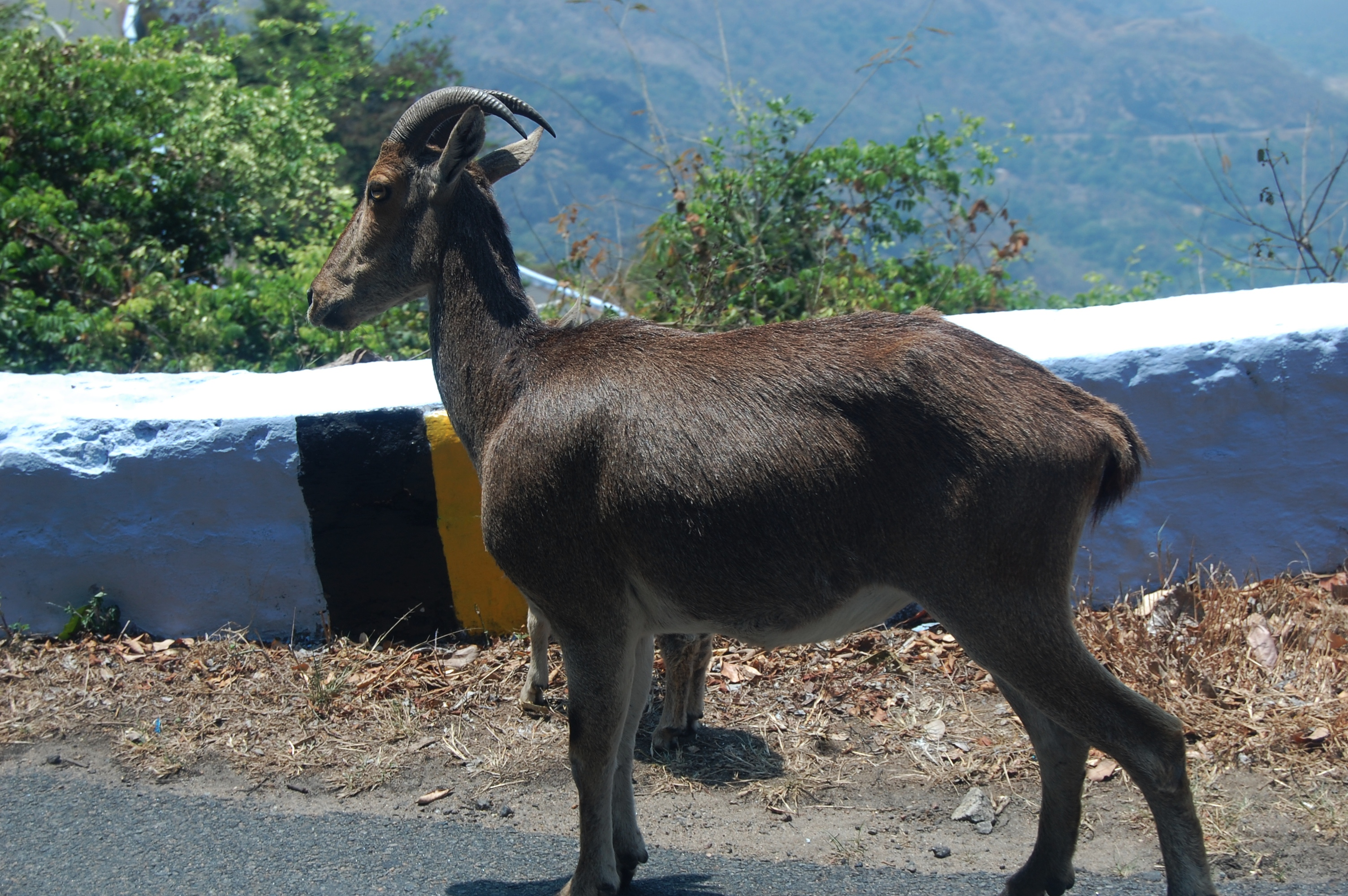
Nilgiri thar

Valparai receives among the highest rainfall in the region during the monsoons (around June). The plantations in the town are surrounded by evergreen forests. The region is an elephant tract and is known to have many leopards. The drive to the town from Pollachi passes through the Indira Gandhi Wildlife Sanctuary noted for Bengal tiger, elephants, boars, lion-tailed macaques, gaur, spotted deer, sambar, and giant squirrels. The area is also rich in birds, including the great hornbill, and hosts seasonal migrant birds such as the grey wagtail.

The Valparai range is habitat to the Nilgiri tahr, an endemic wild ungulate. These mountain goats inhabit the high ranges and prefer open terrain, cliffs and grass-covered hills, a habitat largely confined to altitudes from 1200 to 2600m in the southern Western Ghats. Their territory extended far and wide all along these hills in the past, but, because of hunting and large-scale habitat destruction, they now exist only in a few isolated sites like the Anaimalai Hills. The human-elephant conflict here is a delicate issue. The tea plantations are a hindrance to the movement of wildlife, particularly elephants who walk large distances to reach water bodies and feeding areas.

== Tourist attractions ==
Monkey Falls and Sholayar Dam are two major tourist attractions in the region. A botanical garden and a house boat were expected to be opened for public visitors by January 2021.
