= Chalakudy =

Town in Kerala, India

- Town
- Chalakudy
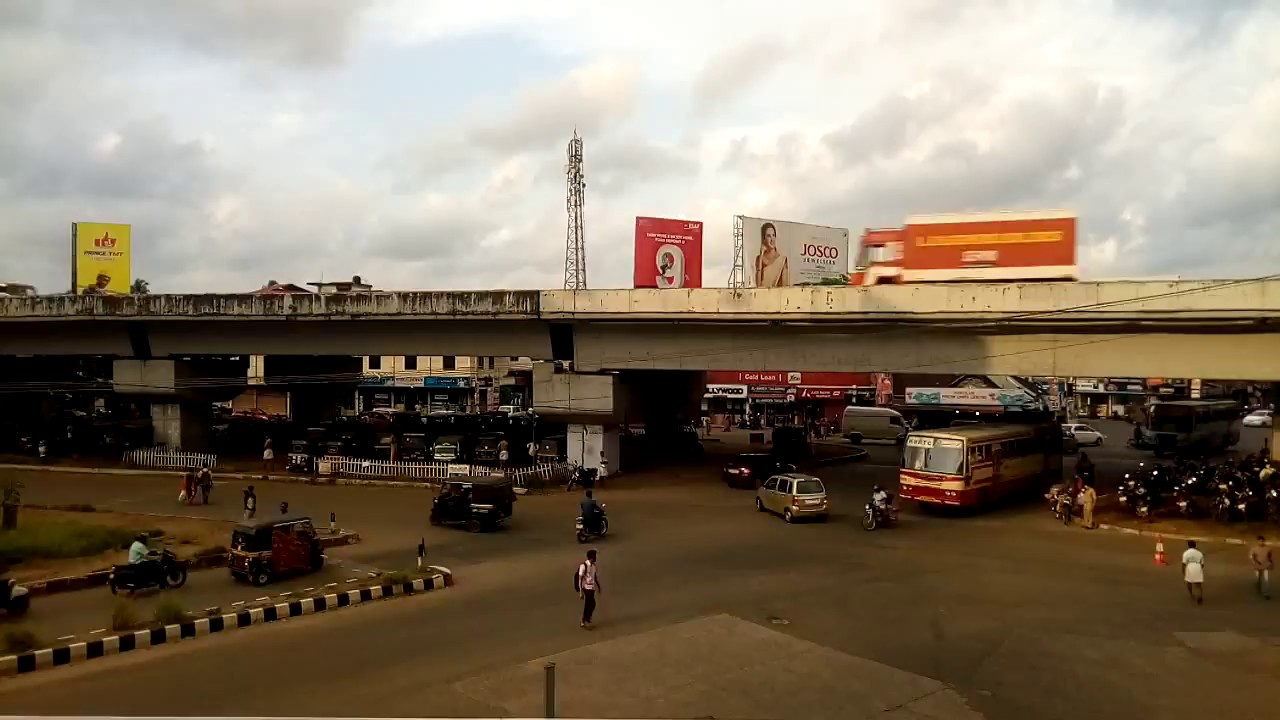
- Chalakudy South Junction

- Location in Kerala, India Chalakudy (India)
- Coordinates: 10.30°N 76.33°E
- Country: India
- State: Kerala
- District: Thrissur
- Established: 1970

Government
  - Type: Taluk
  - Body: Chalakkudy Municipality
  - MLA: T. J. Saneesh Kumar Joseph

Area
  - Total: 25.23 km^{2} (9.74 sq mi)
- Elevation: 16 m (52 ft)

Population (2011)
  - Total: 49,525
  - Density: 1,963/km^{2} (5,084/sq mi)
- Time zone: UTC+5:30 (IST)
- PIN: 680307
- Telephone code: 0480
- Vehicle registration: KL-64, KL-8, KL-45

Chalakudy (Malayalam: [tʃaːlɐkːuɖi]) is a municipal town on the banks of Chalakudy River in Thrissur district of the Kerala state in India. It is the headquarters of Chalakudy taluk. It is the base camp for travellers to Athirappilly Falls and Vazhachal Falls. Chalakudy lies on National Highway 544 and about 47 km (23 mi) north of the city of Kochi, and 30 km (19 mi) south of Thrissur city.

== Etymology ==
During the second Chera dynasty, people outside Kerala visited Chalakudy to learn Vedas and Kalaripayattu from Chukkikulam Shala. These people lived in the banks of Chalakudy River and this accommodation is called Kudi. The combination of these two words Shalakudi is later modified into Chalakudy.

== Administration ==
Chalakudy Municipality came into existence in the year 1970. The municipality covering an area of 25.23 km^{2} is divided into 36 electoral wards. Chalakudy is a Grade II municipality. It was a major constituent of Mukundapuram Lok Sabha constituency from 1957 until Chalakudy Lok Sabha constituency came into existence in 2008, following the delimitation of parliamentary constituencies based on recommendations of the Delimitation Commission of India. This constituency comprises seven assembly segments spread over two districts—Thrissur (3) and Ernakulam (4). In 2013, Chalakudy became a Taluk. Chalakudy is both a Kerala Assembly constituency & a Lok Sabha constituency.

== Transport ==
=== Road ===
National Highway 544 passes right through the town of Chalakudy and serves as the major access point between Thrissur and Ernakulam Districts. State Highways – SH 21, SH 51 and SH 61 are the other major roads along with district roads providing access to the low lying areas to the west and the high lying areas to the east.

State Highway 21 which starts from Chalakudy and ends at the state boundary with Tamil Nadu at Malakkappara is 86.0 km (53.4 mi) long of which 50.1 km passes entirely through fully protected forest region and is often described as one of the best scenic routes in India due to its picturesque rainforests and frequent sightings of wildlife. The Athirappilly Falls and Vazhachal Falls are located along this route.

The Chalakudy KSRTC bus stand is the main hub for intra state travel to major towns and cites in Kerala and also to the various remote locations within the Thrissur District. There are regular KSRTC bus services to Puthukkad, Athirappilly, Malakkappara and an inter state service to Valparai Hill Station in Tamil Nadu. Chalakudy also has a private bus stand that has frequent schedules to Irinjalakuda, Aloor, Kodakara, Kodungallur, Mala, Ashtamichira, Puthenvelikkara, Meloor, Koratty, Angamaly, Kodassery, Athirappilly, Valparai.

=== Railways ===
Chalakudi is the 2nd largest Railway Station in Thrissur which is operated by the Southern Railway zone of Indian Railways, and comes under Thiruvananthapuram railway division which provides a major connection to South and North Kerala.

=== Airport ===
The nearest Airport is Cochin International Airport in Nedumbassery which is 19 km from Chalakudy. All the major domestic and international flights are available here. Direct flights are available to New Delhi, Mumbai, Chennai, Bengaluru, Kolkata, Hyderabad, Pune, Goa, Mangaluru, Kozhikode, Thiruvananthapuram, London, Dubai, Sharjah, Abu Dhabi, Doha, Bahrain, Kuwait, Muscat, Malé, Colombo, Kuala Lumpur, Singapore, Salalah, Jeddah, and Riyadh.

== Population ==
According to 2011 census, Chalakudy's total population comes to 114,901. The density of the population is 4554 per sq Km. Out of the total population, 55,276 constitute males and 59625 females. The children (aged 6–10) constitute 8.86% and is lower than National Urban average which is 10.93%. The literacy rate of Chalakudy is 96.42% and higher than the National Urban average which is 85% of which male literacy rate is 97.53% and female literacy rate is 95.41%. The sex ratio of Chalakudy stands at 96.42%.

== Education ==
Chalakudy hosts major educational institutions consisting of higher secondary schools, English and Malayalam medium high schools, an aeronautical college, a government industrial training institute, a medical college, and many other professional institutions.

=== Schools ===
- Government Boys' Higher Secondary School, Chalakudy
- Carmel Higher Secondary School, Chalakudy
- Sacred Heart Convent Girls' Higher Secondary School, Chalakudy
- CKM NSS Senior Secondary School
- Crescent Public School, Chalakudy
- Vyasa Vidyanikethan Central School, Chalakudy
- CMI Public School, Chalakudy
- Government Higher Secondary School, V R Puram
- Government Girls High School, Chalakudy
- Carmel Academy CMI ICSE School, Chalakudy

=== Colleges ===
- Panampilly Memorial Government College
- Sacred Heart College Chalakudy
- Southern College of Engineering & Technology
- St. James College of Pharmaceutical Sciences
- St. James College of Nursing
- Nirmala College of Arts and Science
- Nirmala College of Management
- Nirmala College of Engineering
- Nirmala College of Health Science

== Tourism ==
Chalakudy is sub urban town blessed with the abundance of greenery mainly due to the Chalakudy river and many green agricultural paddy fields. The Town is the major corridor for tourists travelling to Athirapally & Vazhachal Waterfalls and the hill stations of Malakappara & Valparai. The multiple access points to the Chalakudy River serves as a evening getaway location like Koodapuzha Checkdam, Arangali Kadavu and Urumbunkunnu.

Chalakudy is also very popular for film shoots which are concentrated in the Athirapally region.The waterfalls are a recurring backdrop for iconic, glamorous scenes featuring actresses like Tamannaah Bhatia, Aishwarya Rai Bachchan and Preity Zinta

== Industry, Commerce, and Agriculture ==
Once home to several major industries such as Travancore Tanneries, Cochin Potteries, Tram Workshop, Cochin Rubber Works, Cochin Chemicals, Tapioca Products of India, Srinivas Timber Products, and a Plywood Factory, only a handful of industrial establishments exist at Chalakudy today. Despite this, Chalakudy ranks among the leading towns in Kerala in terms of quality of life indicators.

In earlier times, the Chalakudy market, then known as Kunnathangadi Chantha, was a major center of trade. However, the expansion of road infrastructure led to its decline. Efforts to revive the market began with the construction of a new market complex in 1928, and the traditional weekly markets continue to be held on Tuesdays and Fridays.

For many years, Chalakudy has consistently recorded the highest sales of foreign liquor in Kerala. Foreign liquor sales in Chalakudy amounted to ₹6,385,290, over a three-day period during Christmas in 2023. On 2008 Christmas Eve, Chalakudy again topped the list for liquor sales in the state amounting to ₹78 lakhs.

=== Other Industrial Establishments ===
==== Eddy Current Controls ====
Chalakudy played a pioneering role in India's automotive history by developing the country's first electric car. Established in 1971 with about 40 workers, the company was engaged in the production of electrical components such as dynamos and batteries, supplying equipment to the government as well. Although operations ceased in 1987 following labor disputes, the company later resumed operations based in Bengaluru, with limited activity continuing in Chalakudy.

==== Timber Industry ====
Chalakudy has long been renowned for its timber industry. Although the tram system built by the British for transporting logs from the forests is now defunct, remnants of it still exist. Numerous small-scale industries involved in woodcraft and household furniture manufacturing operate in the region. The furniture unit under the Chalakudy-Kunnathunad Technical Co-operative Society continues to function profitably on a co-operative basis.

==== Plywood ====
The first plywood manufacturing unit in India was established in Chalakudy. Founded by V. K. Menon in 1943 under the name Standard Furniture Company, it was later acquired by United Plywood, which now manages the factory and exports its products internationally.

== Notable persons ==
- Panampilly Govinda Menon
- A. K. Lohithadas
- Kalabhavan Mani
- Jose Pellissery
- Lijo Jose Pellissery
- P. K. Ittoop
- R. L. V. Ramakrishnan
- Antony Thachuparambil
- Raghavan Thirumulpad
- Porinju Veliyath
- C. S. Venkiteswaran
- B. D. Devassy
- Girish A. D.
