= Pollachi =

- Town
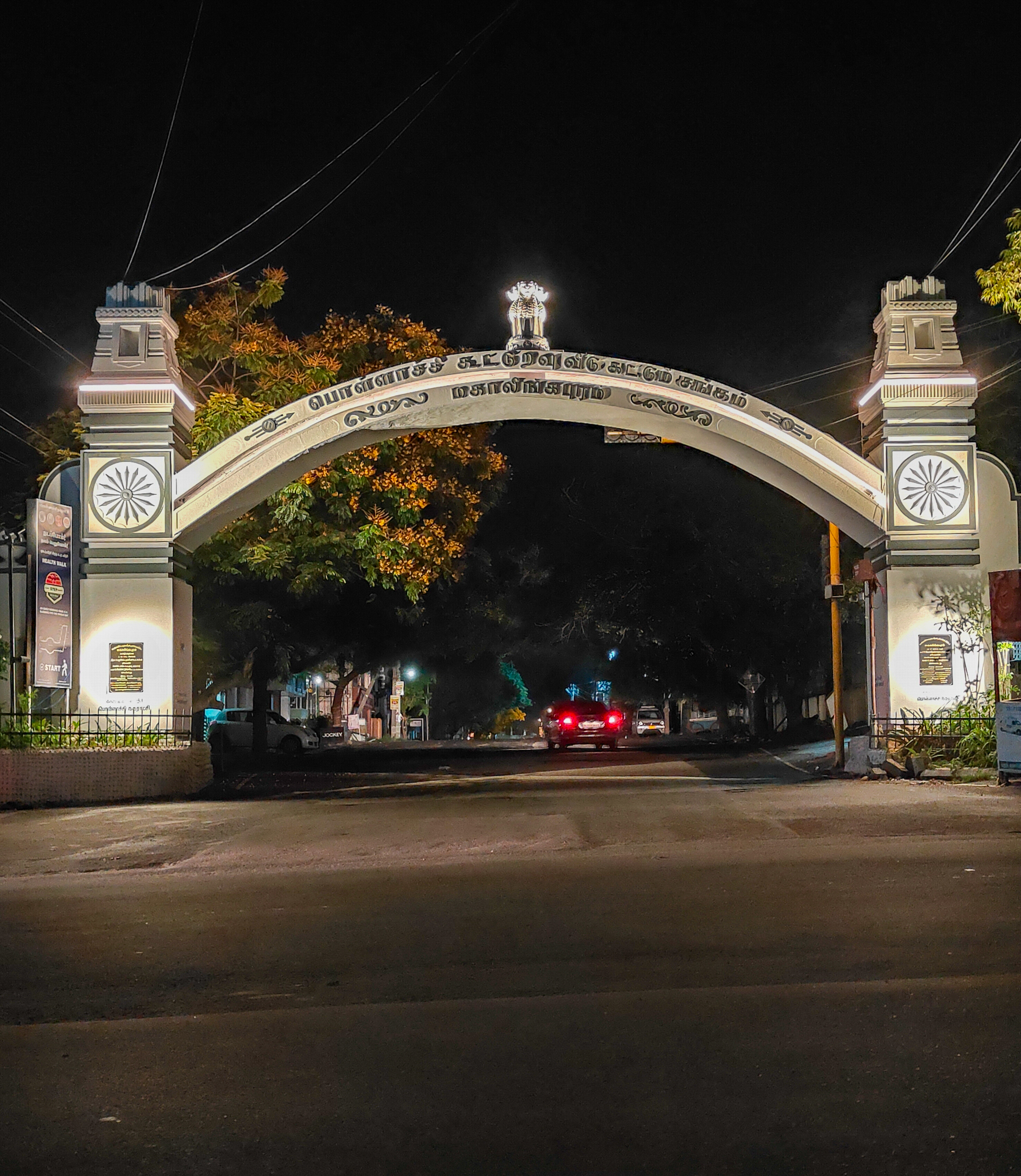
- Mahalingapuram arch

- Location in India
- Coordinates: 10.659°N 77.008°E
- Country: India
- State: Tamil Nadu
- Taluk: Pollachi

Government
  - Type: Special Grade Municipality
  - Body: Pollachi Municipality

Population (2011)
  - Total: 90,180

Languages
  - Official/Spoken: Tamil
- Time zone: UTC+5:30 (IST)
- Postal code: 6420xx
- Telephone code: +91-4259
- Vehicle registration: TN 41

Pollachi is a town and municipality in Coimbatore district of the Indian state of Tamil Nadu. It is the administrative headquarters of Pollachi taluk. It is situated near the centre of the South Indian Peninsula, surrounded by Western Ghats. Agriculture and textile industries contribute heavily to the economy of the town and the town is a popular marketplace for jaggery, vegetables and cattle.

The town is a part of Pollachi constituency that elects its member to the Tamil Nadu legislative assembly and the Pollachi constituency that elects its member of parliament. The town is administered by Pollachi Municipality established in 1949 and has a population of 90,180 as per the 2011 census. The town is popular for the film shooting that takes place here and many films in Tamil and other languages have been shot here.

== Etymology ==
Pollachi is probably derived from Pozhil Vaitchi which means "gifted with beauty" in Tamil. Edicts indicate that the region was known as Pozhil Vaitchi during the Chola period.

== Geography ==
Pollachi is located at 10.662°N 77.0065°E near the center of the South Indian Peninsula, surrounded by Western Ghats. It has an average elevation of 293 metres (961 ft) on the banks of Aliyar river. The area is hilly and rocky, drained by several rivers and is thickly forested with some marsh lands and scattered patches of grass. The town receives most of its average annual rainfall of 1,274 mm (50.2 in) from the southwest monsoon, which reaches the town through the Palghat gap.

Climate data for Pollachi (1900–2024, extremes 1917–2020)
Month	Jan	Feb	Mar	Apr	May	Jun	Jul	Aug	Sep	Oct	Nov	Dec	Year
Record high °C (°F)	34.6 (94.3)	35.1 (95.2)	38.9 (102.0)	40.6 (105.1)	41.1 (106.0)	35.2 (95.4)	32.7 (90.9)	34.8 (94.6)	35.2 (95.4)	34.9 (94.8)	34.1 (93.4)	31.1 (88.0)	41.1 (106.0)
Mean daily maximum °C (°F)	32.1 (89.8)	34.2 (93.6)	35.8 (96.4)	36.0 (96.8)	33.7 (92.7)	29.1 (84.4)	28.5 (83.3)	28.1 (82.6)	29.7 (85.5)	30.9 (87.6)	31.1 (88.0)	30.7 (87.3)	32.1 (89.8)
Mean daily minimum °C (°F)	21.4 (70.5)	21.7 (71.1)	23.9 (75.0)	24.5 (76.1)	24.2 (75.6)	22.5 (72.5)	22.1 (71.8)	22.4 (72.3)	22.8 (73.0)	22.9 (73.2)	22.6 (72.7)	21.4 (70.5)	22.1 (71.8)
Record low °C (°F)	13.1 (55.6)	11.9 (53.4)	16.3 (61.3)	17.3 (63.1)	18.5 (65.3)	18.6 (65.5)	18.1 (64.6)	19.1 (66.4)	19.0 (66.2)	15.1 (59.2)	15.9 (60.6)	12.2 (54.0)	11.9 (53.4)
Average rainfall mm (inches)	12.5 (0.49)	11.2 (0.44)	26.8 (1.06)	80.9 (3.19)	113.3 (4.46)	179.6 (7.07)	251.1 (9.89)	157.4 (6.20)	92.3 (3.63)	190.1 (7.48)	168.7 (6.64)	62.9 (2.48)	1,346.9 (53.03)
Average rainy days	0.3	0.3	0.9	3.3	5.9	18.7	20.0	15.8	9.2	10.1	4.7	0.9	90.1
Average relative humidity (%) (at 17:30 IST)	46	39	38	52	60	79	82	81	75	73	65	56	61

== Demographics ==
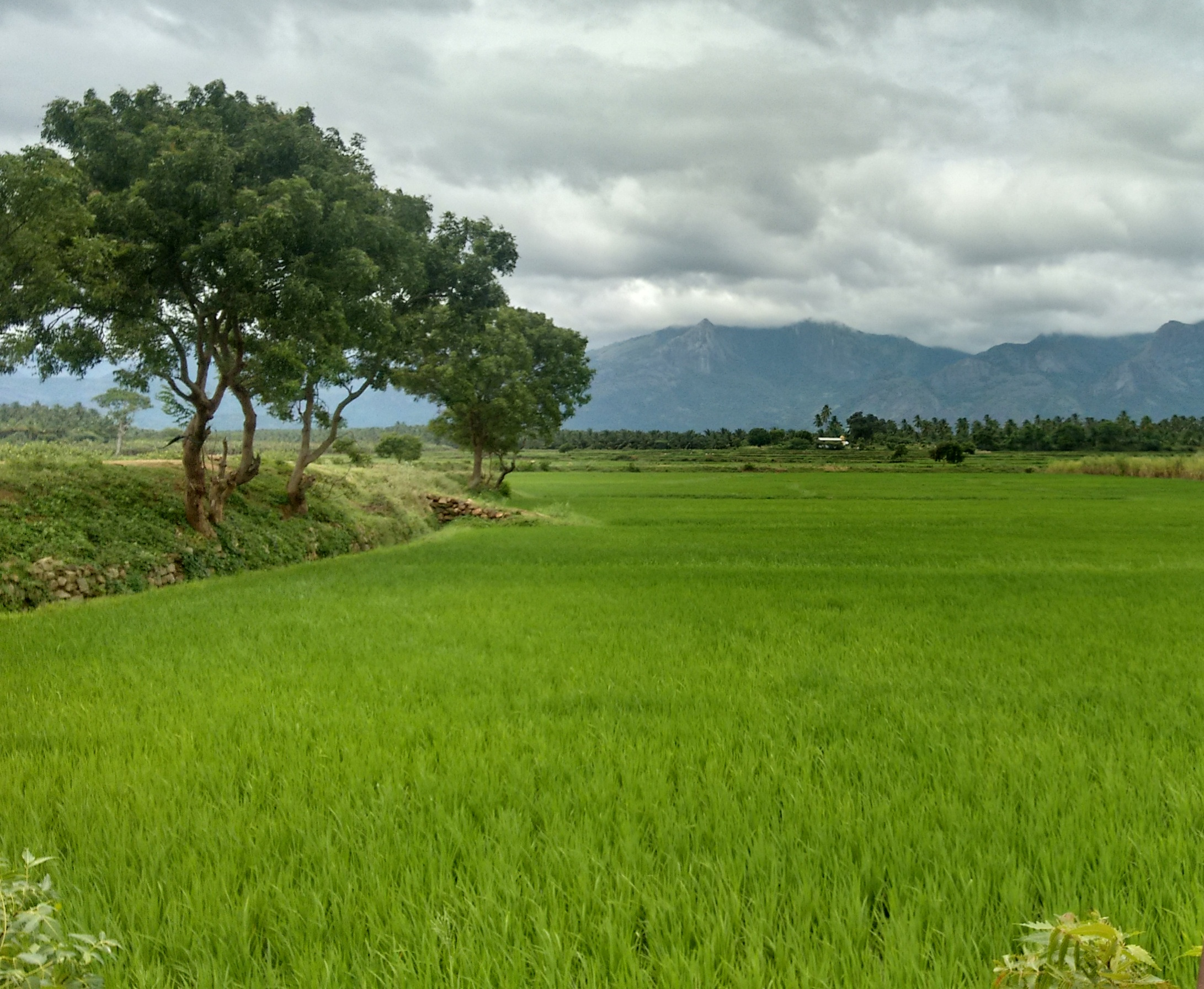
The economy of the town is predominantly dependent on agriculture

According to the 2011 census, Pollachi had a population of 90,180 with a sex-ratio of 1,012 females for every 1,000 males, above the national average of 929. A total of 7,732 were under the age of six, constituting 3,952 males and 3,780 females. Scheduled Castes and Scheduled Tribes accounted for 10.57% and 0.29% of the population respectively. The average literacy of the city was 82.15%, compared to the national average of 72.99%. The city had a total of 24,755 households. There were a total of 36,972 workers, comprising 219 cultivators, 488 main agricultural labourers, 1,018 in household industries, 32,720 other workers, 2,527 marginal workers, 25 marginal cultivators, 45 marginal agricultural labourers, 124 marginal workers in household industries and 2,333 other marginal workers.

== Economy ==
The economy of the town is predominantly dependent on agriculture. Coconut, jaggery, vegetables and cattle contribute to the agricultural output. There are also coir producing units with raw materials sourced from local farms. Vanilla is also cultivated in certain locations. Pollachi is also a popular movie shooting location for the Tamil film industry owing to its scenic landscape. Cotton saris woven in handlooms in Negamam near Pollachi are popular for their vibrant coloured borders, and distinct, heavy thread-work motifs on the pallu (open edges).

== Transport ==
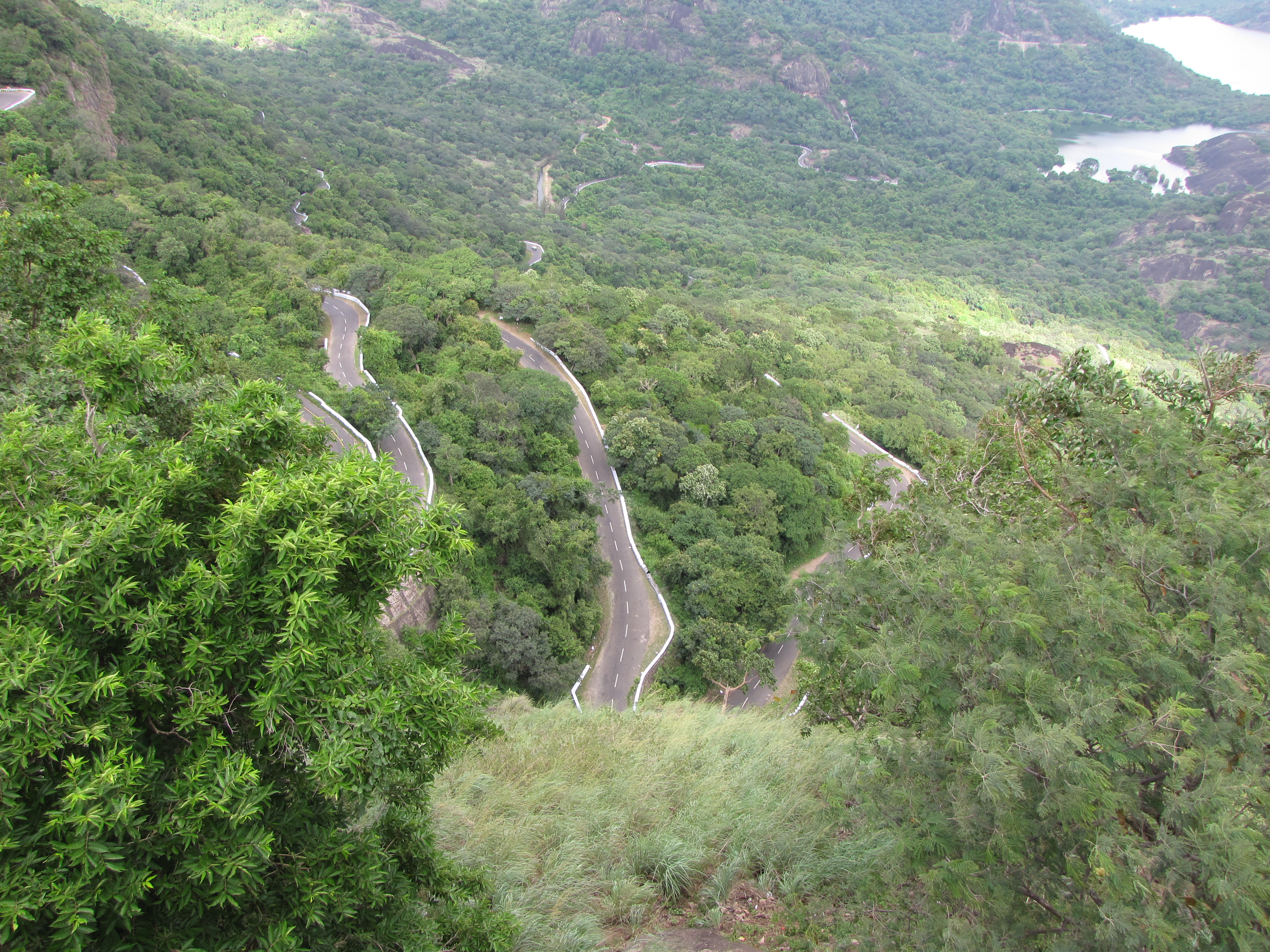
Road from Pollachi to Valparai amidst the Western Ghats

Pollachi is connected by National Highway 209 and state highways 19, 21, 78 and 78A. The central bus stand caters for bus transport which is operated by government-run TNSTC and private operators. State Express Transport Corporation operates long-distance buses.

Pollachi Railway Junction lies on the junction of Palakkad–Dindigul and Coimbatore–Pollachi branch lines with Palakkad to the west, Coimbatore to the north and Dindigul to the east. Metre to broad gauge conversion on Dindigul line was completed in January 2015. In 2017, the track between Pollachi and Podanur was converted from metre to broad gauge at a cost of ₹340 crore (US$35 million).

The nearest airport is Coimbatore International Airport, located 48 kilometres (30 mi) from the town. The airport has regular flights from/to major domestic destinations and international destinations like Sharjah, Colombo and Singapore.

== Places of interest ==
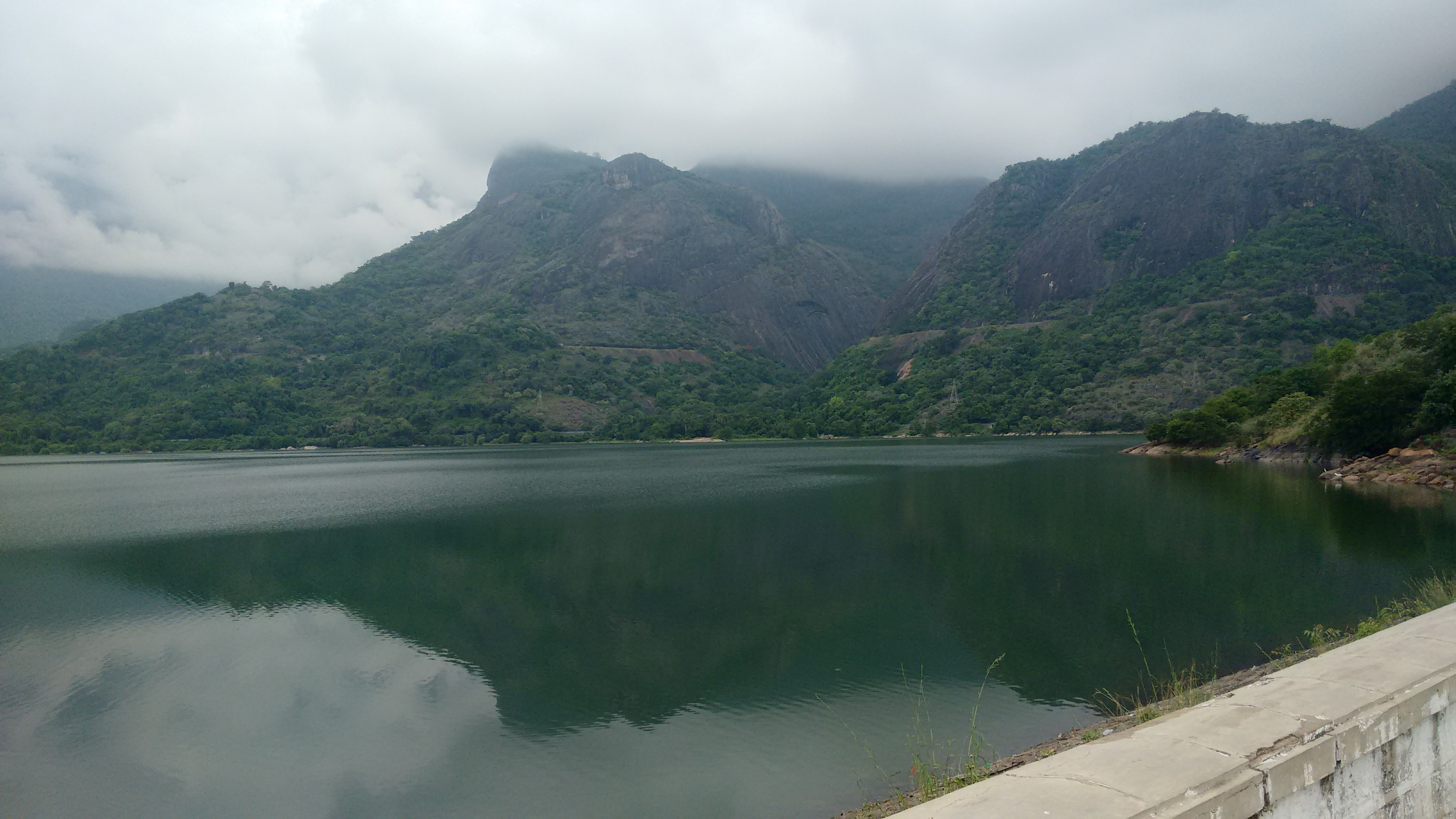
Azhiyar Dam

Anamalai Wildlife Sanctuary is situated at an average altitude of 1,400 feet (430 m) in the Western Ghats near Pollachi. Valparai is a hill station about 65 kilometres (40 mi) from Pollachi and is situated at an altitude of 3,500 feet (1,100 m). Topslip is a popular picnic spot located at an altitude of about 800 feet (240 m) in the Anamalai mountain range which is about 37 kilometres (23 mi) from Pollachi. Parambikulam Wildlife Sanctuary is situated in the valley between the Anaimalai Hills of Tamil Nadu and the Nelliampathi range of Kerala. Parambikulam-Aliyar multipurpose project involves a series of dams interconnected by tunnels and canals at various elevations to harness the various rivers flowing through the area. Azhiyar Dam is located in the foothills of Anamalai in the Western Ghats and Solaiyar Dam is 15 kilometres (9.3 mi) from Valparai and is one of the largest rock dams in India.

Thirumurthyswami temple, dedicated to Shiva, is situated in the foothills of the Thirumurthy Hills. Other major temples include Masani Amman Temple, Eachanari Vinayagar Temple and Temple of Consciousness founded by Vethathiri Maharishi.

== See also ==
- 2019 Pollachi sexual assault case
