= Potta =

Village in Thrissur District, Kerala, India

Coordinates: 19°05′N 83°59′E

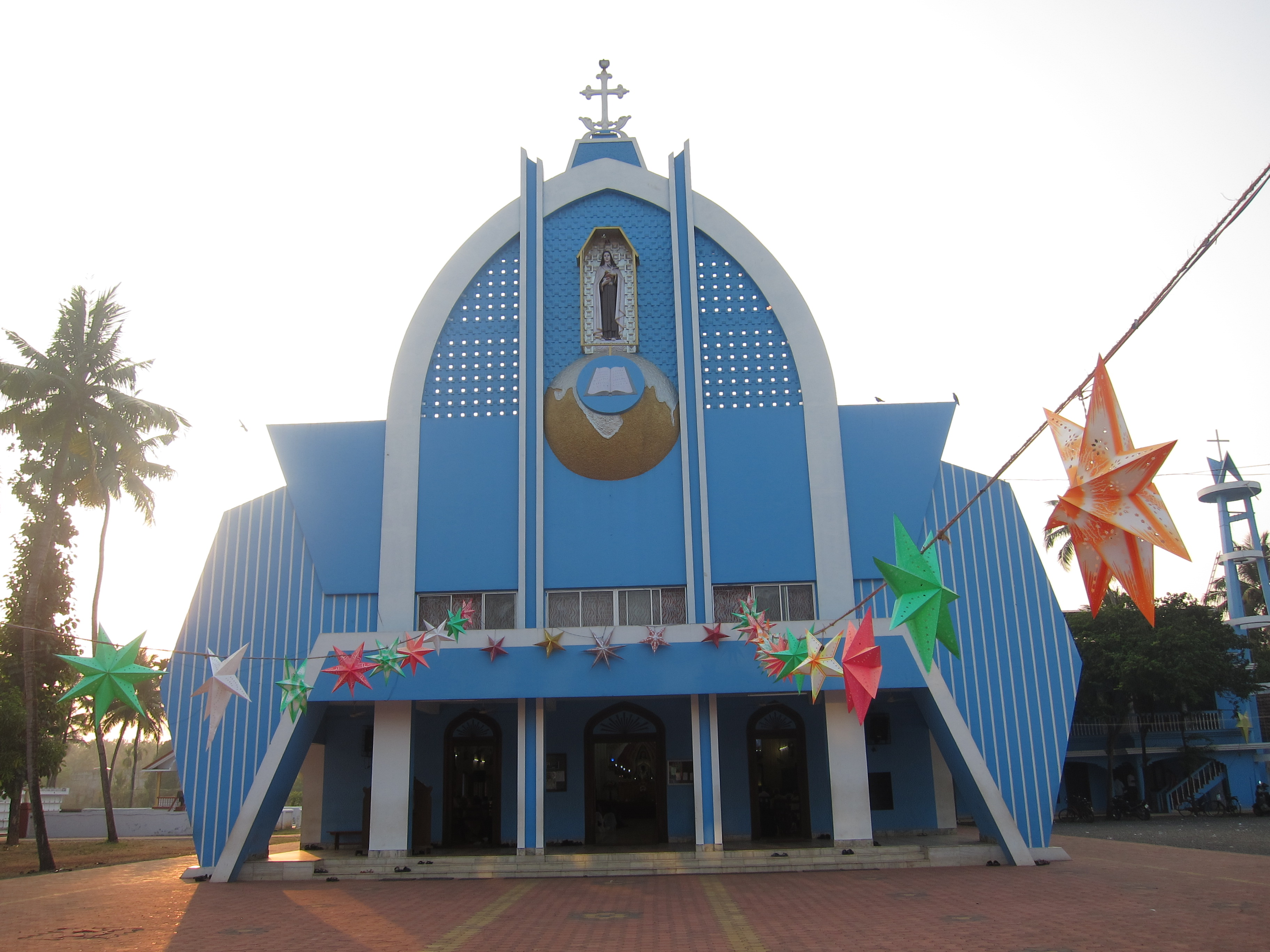

Potta is a village 30 miles north of Kochi, also known as Cochin. It belongs to the municipality of Chalakudy in the Thrissur district, state of Kerala, India. Potta was the temple land under the Irinjalakuda Koodalmanikyam Temple. In the past, the crops needed to supply the temple were cultivated at Potta. The village features famous temples named Pambambot temple, the Parakottilinkal Bhagavathi Temple and the Mathilthkavu Bhagavathi Temple. It also houses a Christian church called Cherupushpam Shrine. Also, several educational institutions could be found there including Panampilly Memorial Government College, Vyasa Vidyaniketan Central School, Kuriakos Chavara UP School and Dhanya Mission Hospital.

Located on National Highway 544 between Chalakudy and Perambra.

== Location ==
Athirappilly is twenty-eight kilometres from Potta. Two water theme parks are located on route; the Dream World and Silver Storm.

== Attractions ==
- Dream World Water Theme Park (east of town; en route to the Athirappally water falls).
- Thumboormuzhy Check Dam & Garden (east of town; en route to the Athirappilly waterfalls).
- Oil palm Plantation (en route to the Athirappilly waterfalls.
- Silver Storm Water Theme Park (east of town; en route to the Athirappilly waterfalls).
- Athirappilly Waterfalls (east of Town).
- Ezhattumugham (twelve km from Athirappilly; on the Angamaly route via Vettilappara bridge).
- Charpa Falls (The enchanting but lesser known Charpa falls, which plunges on to the road during the monsoon, is a sight to watch and enjoy.) (east of town; after Athirappilly waterfalls).
- Vazhachal falls and Resorts (east of Town; after Athirappilly waterfalls).
- Chalakudy River, three kilometers south from Potta on NH-544 highway, has a rich fish diversity.
- Kauthukapark

== Elephant Pit ==
Anakkayam, which means the "Elephant pit", is on the Athirappilly route and noted for a lake with cool and placid waters. The place is a forest untouched by human encroachments and acts as a restorative haven for people who wish to escape from their city lives and "concrete jungles". The bubbling streams, natural rock formations, and colorful flora are some major attractions. Parambikulam Wildlife Sanctuary contributes to the peaceful ambiance. The Sholayar Dam Hydro Electric project is Asia's second deepest dam. Peringalkuthu Hydro Electric Project Dam are located near the Athirappilly waterfalls.

== Places of worship ==
- Potta Pambambottu Siva Temple (Koodal Manikyam Devaswam, Irinjalakuda)
- Madathil kavu Temple (Devi temple)
- Parakotikalingal Temple (Devi temple)
- Nanatty Bhagavathy Vishnumaya temple
- Divine Retreat Centre, Muringoor (5 km south on NH 544)
- Little flower Church Potta
- St. Antony's Church [Perambra -Thrissur]
- Jumamasjid; 3 km away

== Transportation ==
Potta is conveniently connected by air, rail, and road. Located very close to the National Highway 544; it is south of Thrissur, north of Ernakulam, and Cochin International Airport (Nedumbassery); easy access by major airlines, including British Airways. Chalakudy railway station is just five kilometers away; Enquiry number (0480–2701368). Chalakudy Town – Vazhachal road also known as State Highway 21, is a two-lane road.

== Educational Organizations ==
- Panampilli Govinda Menon Govt. College.
- Vyasa Vidyanikethan Central School
- Kuriyakos Eliyas Chavara UP School

== Politics ==
Chalakudy assembly constituency is part of Chalakudy Lok Sabha constituency.
