= Ezhattumugham, Kerala =

Village in Ernakulam District, Kerala, India

Ezhattumugham, situated along the Chalakudy River, is a tourist village in the Ernakulam district of Kerala, located in the southwestern part of India.

== Tourism ==
Ezhattumugham has many walking paths, campgrounds, and palm oil farms. It has recently become the location of many movie sets, in part due to the beauty of the Chalakudy river.

Parts of Raavan, an action-adventure romantic film starring Aishwarya Rai Bachchan and Abhishek Bachchan, were filmed in Ezhattumugham and feature the Athirappally Falls.
