= Charpa Falls =

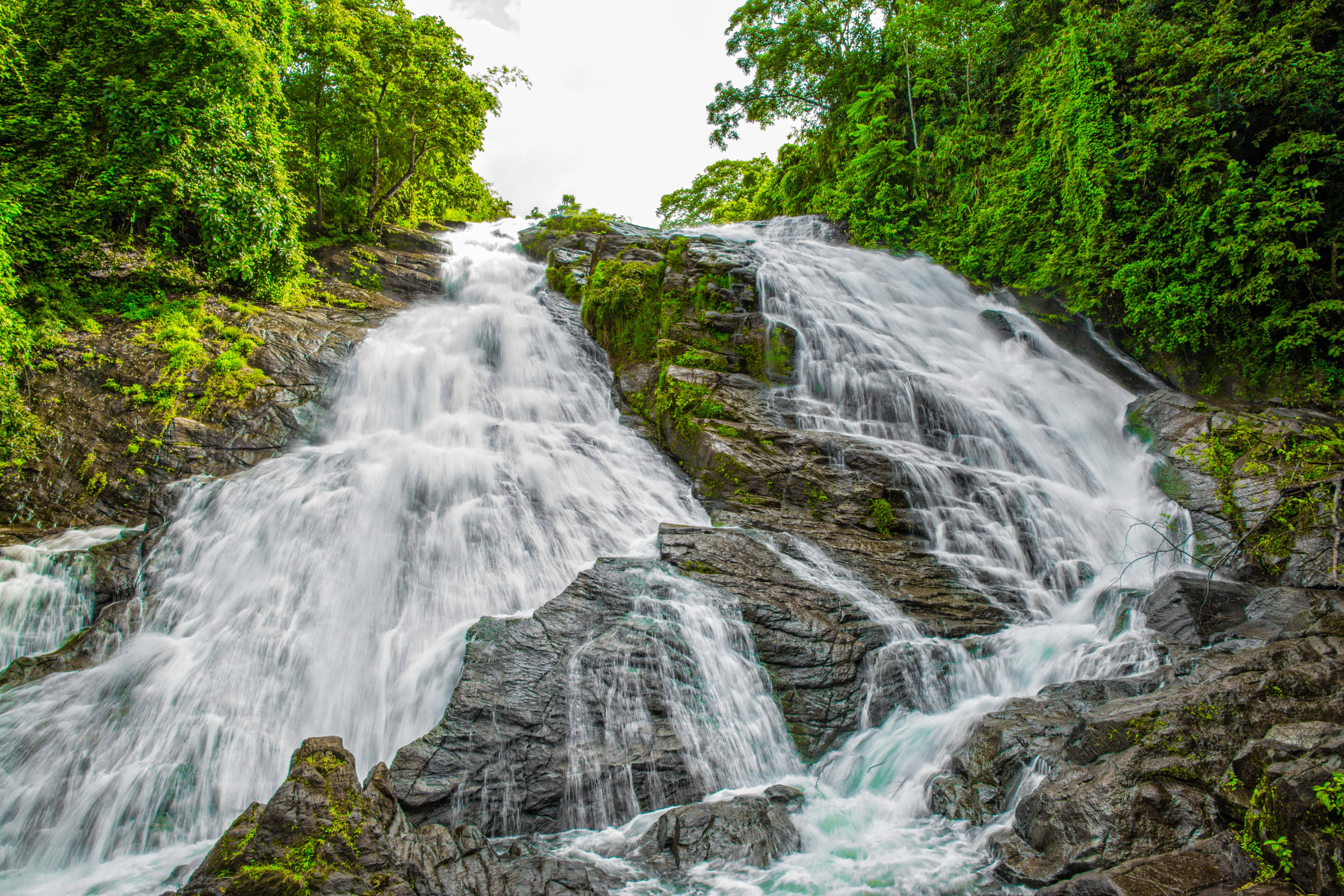
- The Milky Charpa Falls

- Location within India
- Location: Thrissur District, Kerala, India
- Coordinates: 10°18′16″N 76°34′47″E
- Watercourse: Chalakkudi River

Charpa Falls is a waterfall located in Athirappilly panchayath in Thrissur district of Kerala, India. Located on the west-flowing Chalakudy River, this waterfall lies in between the more famous Athirappilly Falls and Vazhachal Falls. It is a popular stopover for tourists who are visiting the Athirappilly and Vazhachal Falls. It is located close to the road, and during monsoon months (June to August), the water splashes onto the road. During the dry season, the water stops flowing.

== Gallery ==
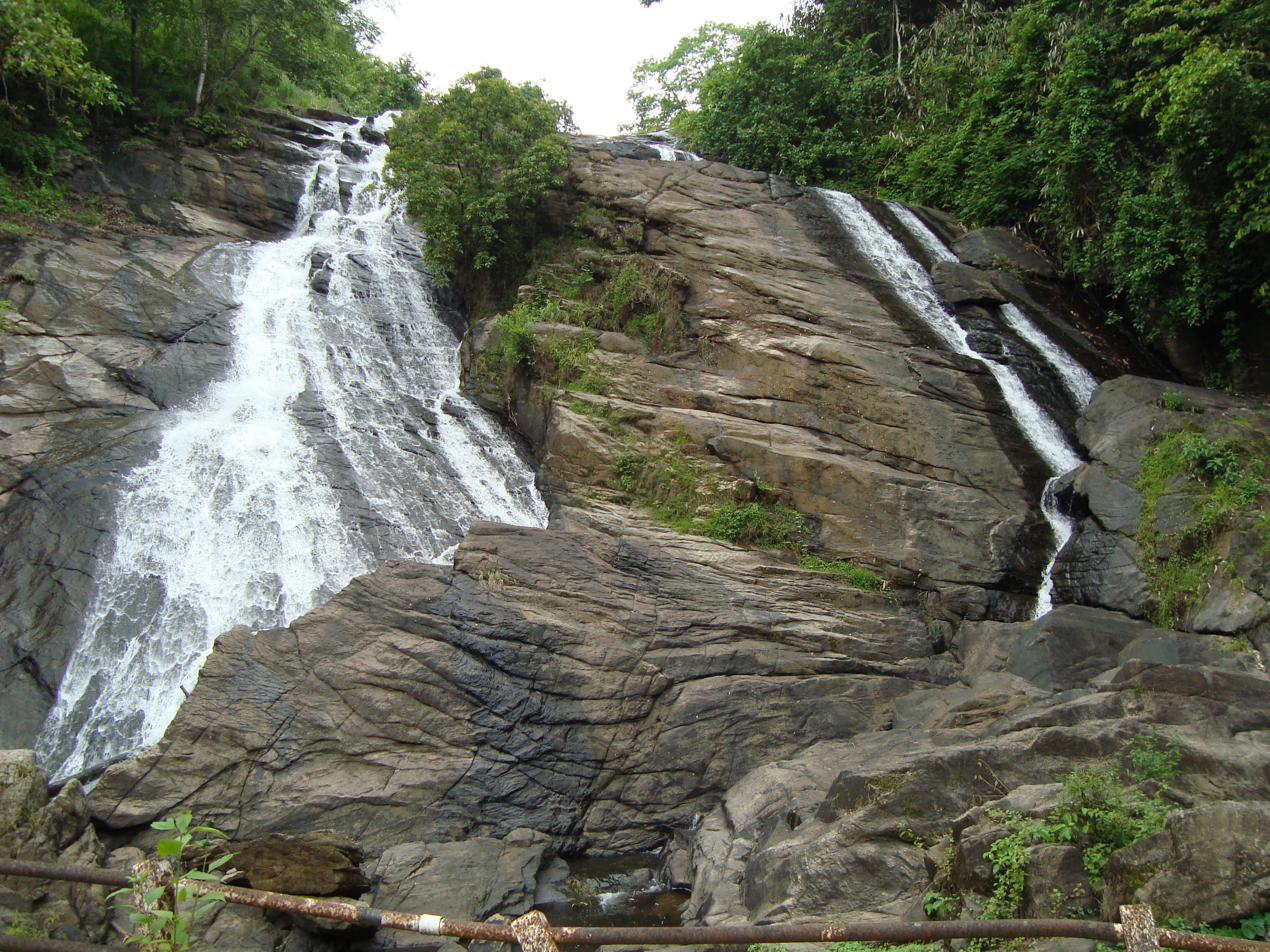
Charpa Falls

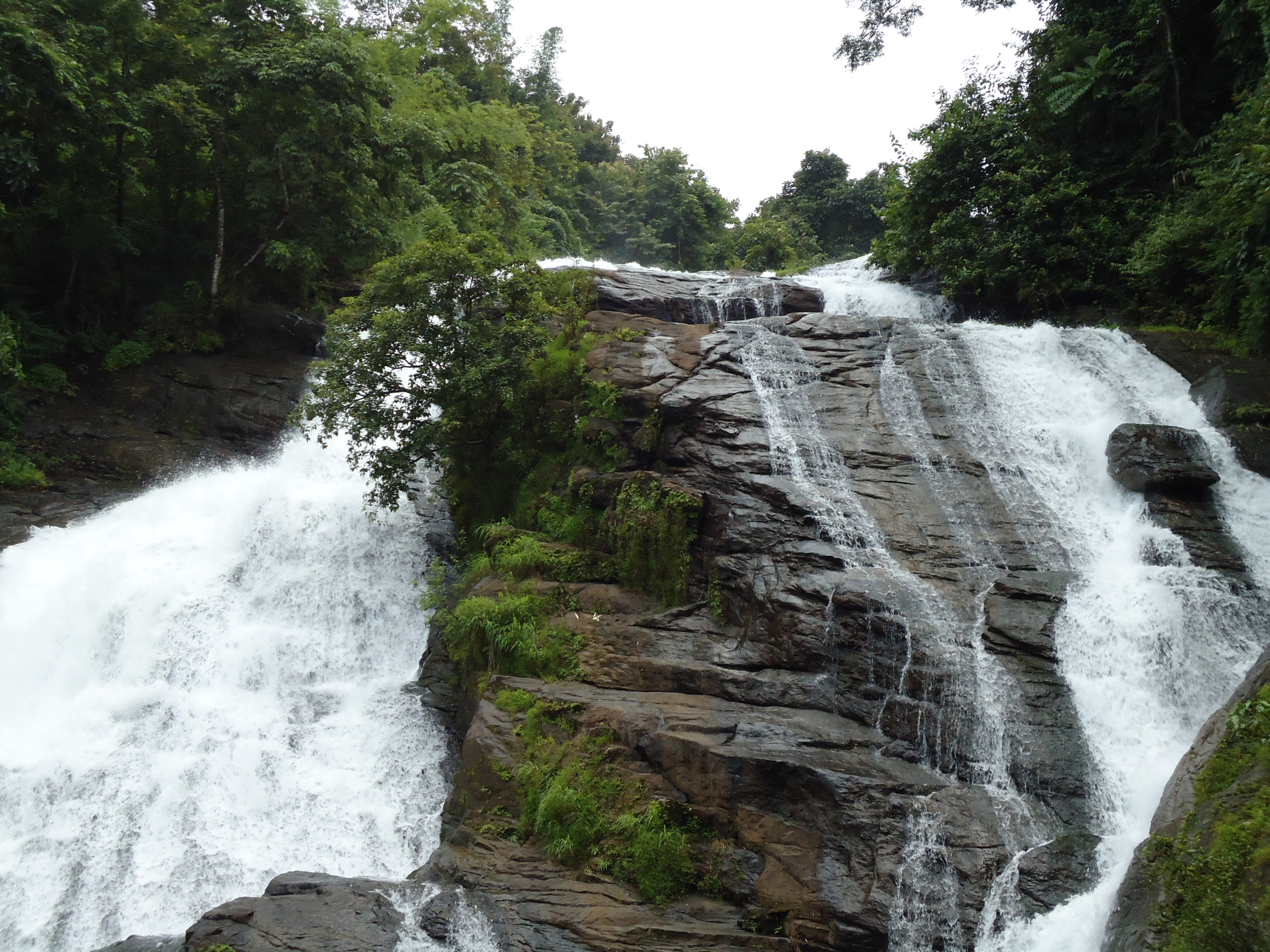
Charpa Falls

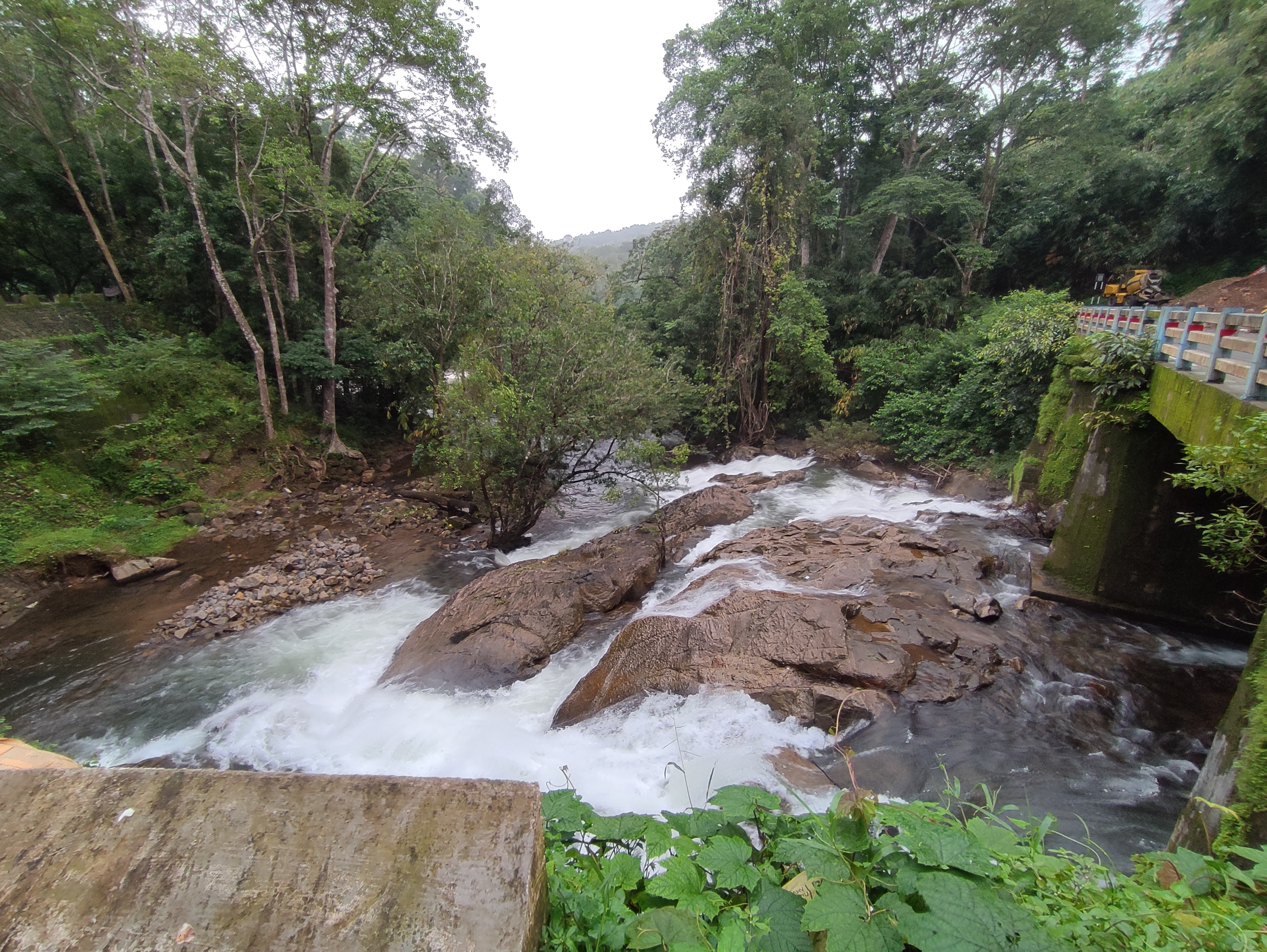
Downstream

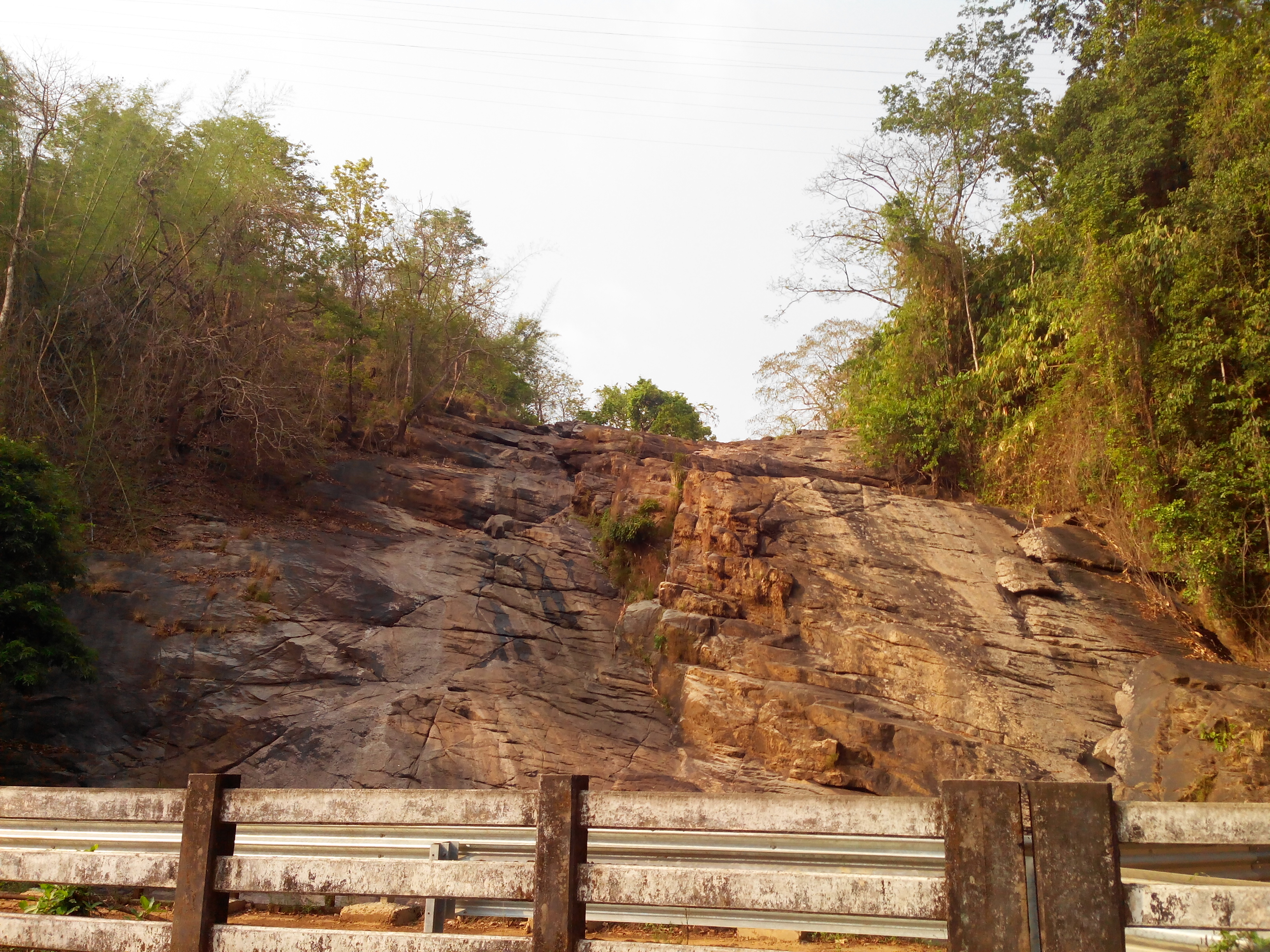
Waterfall during the dry season

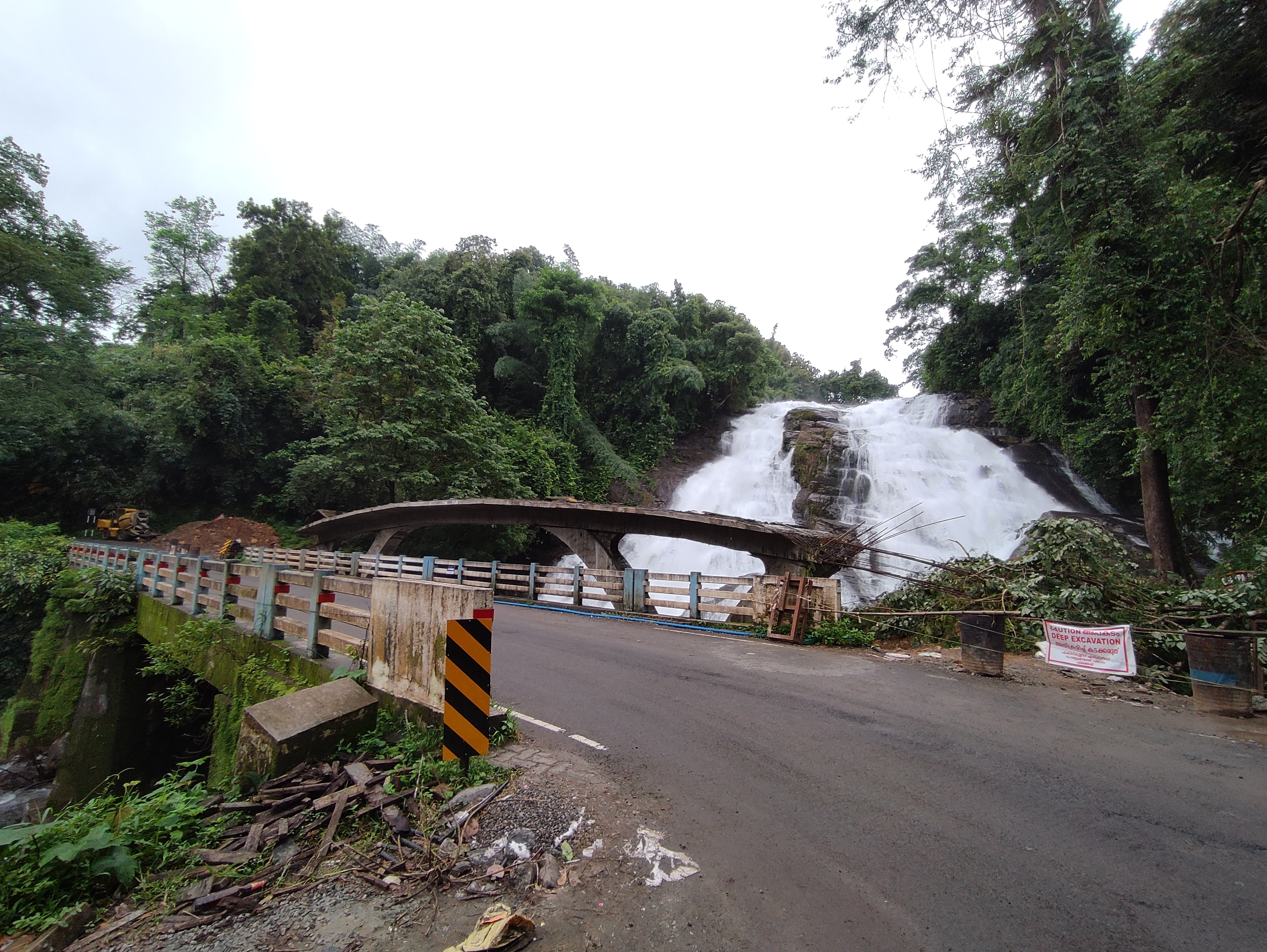
With bridge

== See also ==
- Athirappilly Falls
- Vazhachal Falls
- Chalakudy
- List of waterfalls
- List of waterfalls in India
- List of waterfalls in India by height
