= Aishwarya =

Sanskrit term and name

- Gender: Male, Female
- Language: Sanskrit

Origin
- Meaning: "sovereignty" "wealth"
- Region of origin: India

Other names
- Derived: Aachu, Aish, Ash, Aishu
- Related names: Aishani, Aishwariya, Aiswarya, Ashvarya

Aishwarya (Sanskrit: ऐश्वर्य, romanized: Aiśvarya) is a Hindu Indian and Nepali male or feminine given name, which means "prosperity" and "wealth".

== Notable people named Aishwarya ==
- Aishwarya Rajya Lakshmi Devi Shah (1949–2001), Queen of Nepal from 1972 to 2001
- Aishwariyaa Bhaskaran (born 1971), Indian actress
- Aishwarya Devan (born 1993), Indian actress
- Aishwarya Dhanush (born 1982), Indian film director and classical dancer
- Aishwarya Majmudar (born 1993), Indian singer
- Aishwarya Nedunchezhiyan (born 1996), Indian sailor
- Aishwarya Nigam (born 1989), Indian singer
- Aishwarya Lekshmi (born 1990), Indian actress, model
- Aishwarya Vidhya Raghunath (born 1991), Indian vocalist
- Aishwarya Rai (born 1973), Indian actress, model and winner of the 1994 Miss World pageant
- Aishwarya Rajesh (born 1990), Indian actress
- Aishwarya Rao (born 1994), Indian bowling player
- Aishwarya Sakhuja (born 1987), Indian actress and former model
- Aishwarya Sharma (born 1992), Indian television actress
- Aishwarya Sushmita (born 1994), Indian Film actress

== Notable people named Ashvarya ==
- Ashvarya Shrivastava (born 1992), Indian professional tennis player
