= Potta Ashram =

Catholic organization in India

- Formation: 1950
- Founder: Mathew Naickomparambil V C
- Founded at: Thrissur, Kerala
- Type: Catholic Retreat Center
- Legal status: Active
- Location: Potta Ashram, Potta po, Chalakudy, Thrissur, India, 680722 88CC+5C6, Chalakudy, Kerala 680307
- Official language: Malayalam, English
- Leader: Fr. Mathew Naickomparambil VC; Fr. George Panackal VC; Fr. Mathew Elavungal VC

Potta Ashram is a Catholic charismatic renewal centre in Potta, Thrissur District of Kerala. The centre is managed by the Vincentian Congregation. The centre comes under Syro-Malabar Catholic Diocese of Irinjalakuda.

The Potta Ashram was founded in 1977 as the centre to direct and to co-ordinate popular mission retreats. It functioned as the headquarters and residences of the directors of the center, Frs. George Panackal V.C. and Romulus Nedumchalil, etc., who used to conduct mission retreats and visitations from here.

Timing Now; Every Day Regular Mass at 6.30 am

One Day Convention start at 10.00 am - 1 pm

Friday Convention start at 10.00 am - 2 pm
