= Divine Retreat Centre, Muringoor =

Retreat centre in Muringoor, India

Coordinates: 10°17′32″N 76°20′17″E

Divine Retreat Center, Murigoor
- Formation: 1950
- Founder: Fr.Mathew Naickomparabil V.C
- Legal status: Active
- Official language: Malayalam; English; Tamil; Telugu; Konknni

The Divine Retreat Center is a Retreat centre situated in Muringoor, near Chalakudy, Kerala, India near. It is part of the renewal movement of the Vincentian Congregation of India, who have been conducting retreats in parishes in Kerala since the 1950s. It was inaugurated in 1987.

== History ==
The Potta Ashram was founded in 1977 as the centre to direct and to co-ordinate popular mission retreats. It functioned as the headquarters and residences of the directors of the center, Frs. George Panackal V.C. and Romulus Nedumchalil, etc., who used to conduct mission retreats and visitations from here. A few years later, Fr. Mathew Naickomparambil was transferred to Potta. Fr. Naickomparambil was involved with propagating the Charismatic Renewal. The Renewal movement that began in 1966 at the Duquesne University in Pittsburgh, U.S.A. was brought to India in February 1972.

Fr. George Panackal became impressed by Fr. Naickomparambil's sermons which were the result of his involvement in the Charismatic Renewal. Fr. Naickomparambil's propagation of the Charismatic Renewal drew in thousands of people. After a few years, a three-storey building was put up to conduct the retreats, primarily intended for the people coming to the Ashram for further consultations from places where the Vincentians' Popular Mission Retreats were being conducted. But as Fr. Naickomparambil's Charismatic Renewal retreats grew in popularity, the Potta Ashram itself became a center for numerous retreats.

As the Potta Ashram was inadequate for the increased numbers, under Fr. George Vempilly, the new director, a sprawling new site was acquired at Muringoor, on the banks of the Chalakudy River, six kilometers away from Potta, and Fr. Jacob Athickal was tasked with preparing a new and more extensive facility which was to be called Divine Retreat Center. At this new site, retreats were begun in six other languages besides Malayalam including English, Konkani, Kannada, Telugu, Tamil and Hindi. Since 1990, over 10 million pilgrims from all over the world have attended retreats here. Weekly retreats are held throughout the year. The Retreat Centre has 2 large campuses along both sides of the NH47 – one for the Malayalam retreats and the other for the English and other language retreats. The Divine Nagar Railway halt was opened in 1996.

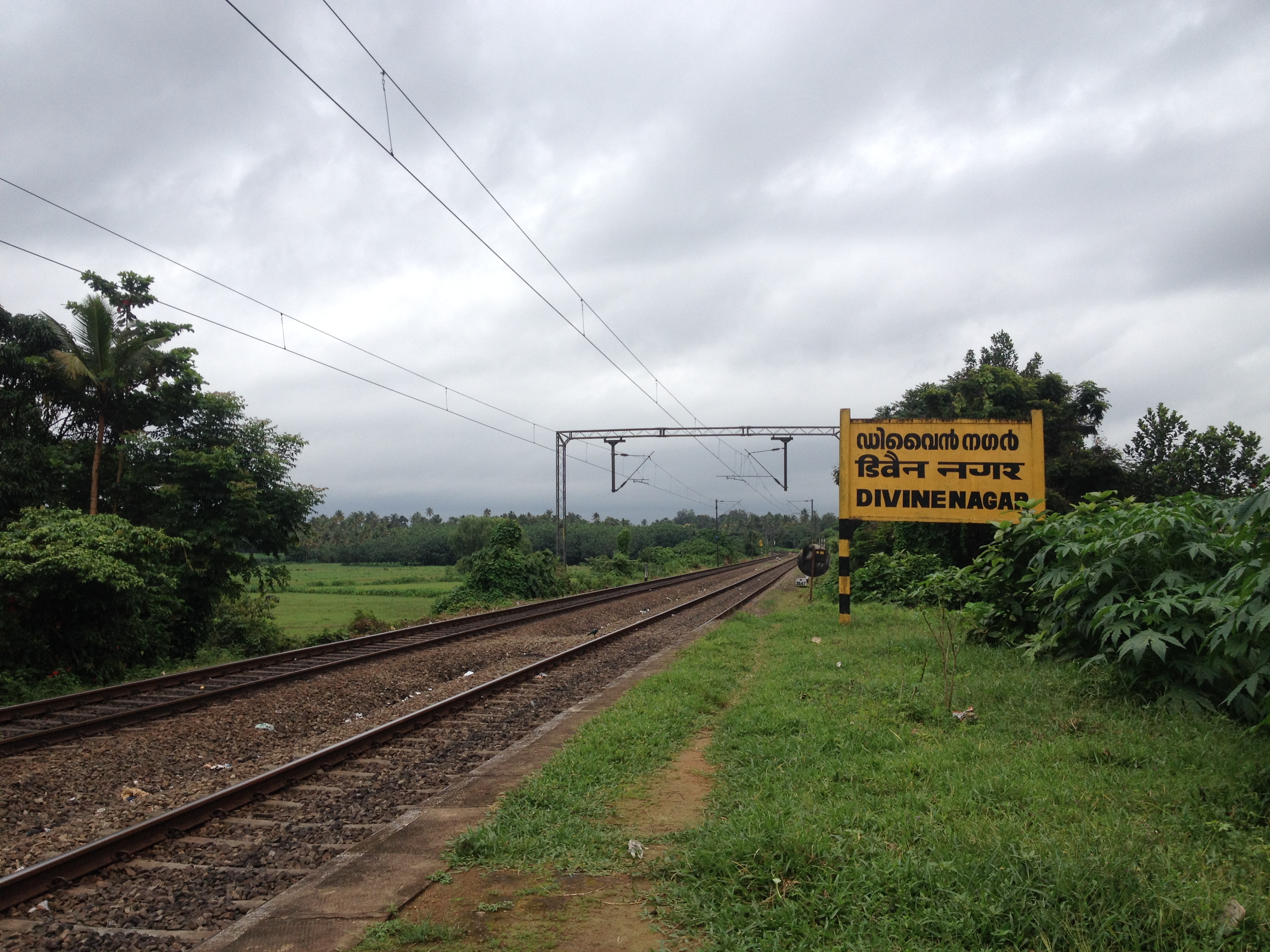
Divine Nagar Railway Station

The retreat centre also houses several homes attending to the sick and the marginalised section of society.

- The Divine Mercy Home for the aged
- St Mary's Home for destitute women (also has a crèche for abandoned children)
- Samaritan Home, for school-going children aged 3 to 17
- Shantipuram Care Centre, a home for the mentally challenged, was started in 2001.
- De-addiction centre.
- St Vincent Aids Home, that looks after the HIV positive and AIDS patients.

== Controversies ==
This place has often seen many controversies. In 2005, a letter addressed to the High Court of Kerala contained compact discs had many serious allegations against the centre, including financial misappropriation including violation of foreign exchange regulations, and wrongful inclusion of the names of inmates in the electoral list. The most sensational among the charges was the alleged suppression, by the centre, of a complaint made by a former inmate that she was raped by the procurator. It was also alleged that a number of unidentified dead bodies were found in and around the centre. In response to this, high court judge Justice K. Padmanabhan Nair ordered the police to investigate the charges and also directed an SIT to be constituted under Inspector General Vinson M. Paul. The team conducted raids at DRC in September last year, seizing documents and videotaping the complex. On the basis of testimonials by witnesses against the centre, the FIR includes the following charges: between 1991 and 2006, as many as 974 people died-not all were natural deaths-at the centre and the dead bodies disposed of without investigation; many developed mental illnesses after going to DRC, particularly after unauthorised administration of psychotropic drugs; patients were kept in forced confinement; the centre's medical institutions have no requisite licences or statutory facilities; and DRC had obtained pecuniary favours from the Government by misrepresenting or withholding facts. Mariyapalana Society, an NGO run by local Catholics, also complained that the centre had tried to receive foreign donations by manipulating documents.
