= George Panackal V.C. =

Indian Catholic Priest

Fr.George Panackal V.C
- George Panackal V.C
- Pronunciation: ജോർജ് പനക്കൽ വി.സി
- Born: Thrissur, Kerala
- Occupations: Priest; Spiritual Motivator
- Years active: 1960
- Organization: Potta Ashram
- Notable work: Divine Retreat Centre, Potta
- Website: https://pottaashram.org

George Panackal V.C. is the director of Divine Retreat Centre, Potta. He is widely renowned among Christians in India for his charitable work, pastoral services as a gospel teacher and interpreter from a Catholic perspective. He preaches regularly at Divine Retreat Centre whose services are aired every day in Shalom TV India, Divine TV, and Goodness (TV channel).
