= Athirappilly =

- Village
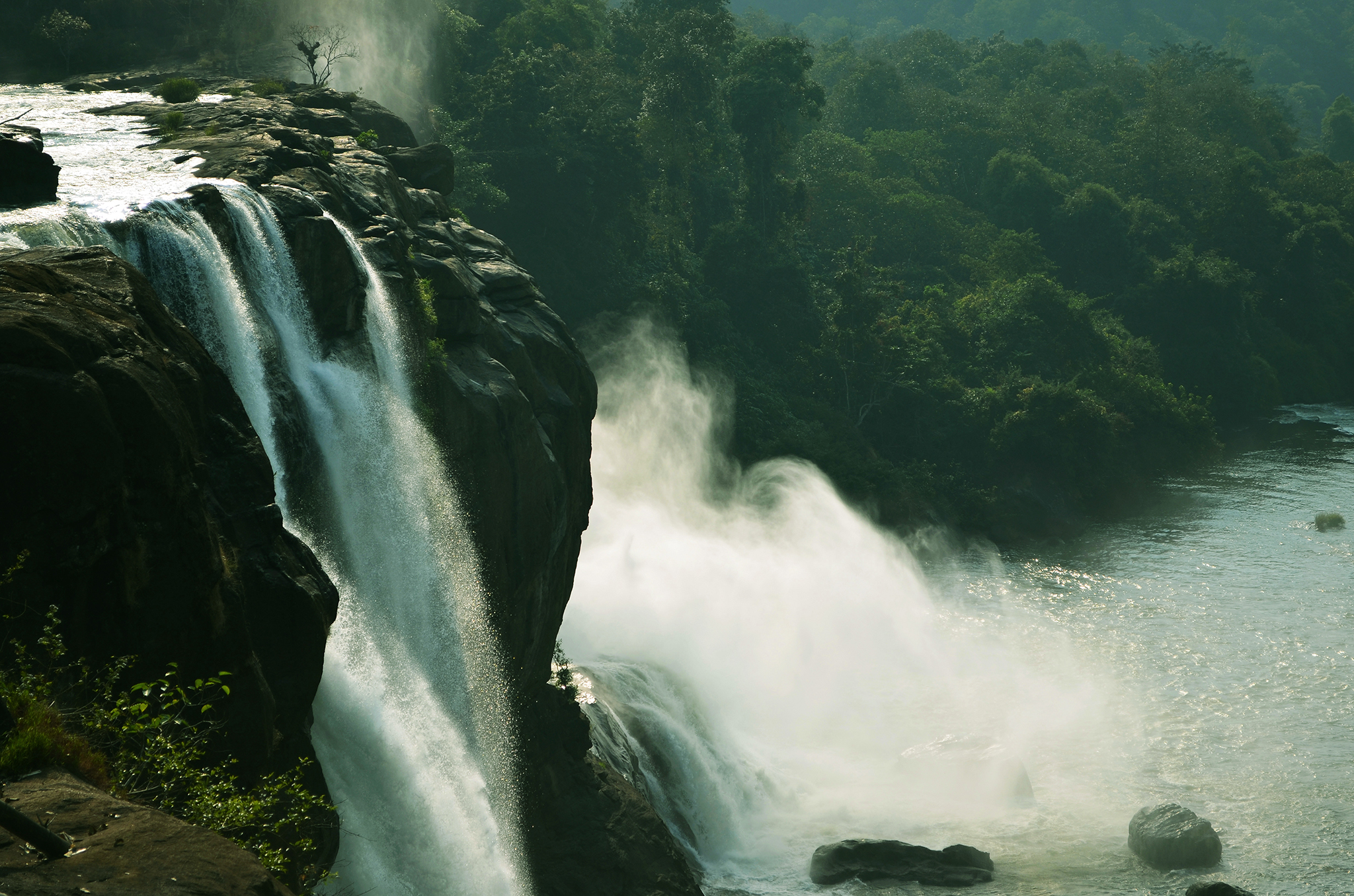
- Athirappilly Falls

- Location in KKLR, India Athirappilly (India)
- Coordinates: 10°17′19″N 76°32′54″E
- Country: India
- State: Kerala
- District: Thrissur

Government
  - Body: Athirapally Grama Panchayat

Area
  - Total: 489.00 km^{2} (188.80 sq mi)
- Elevation: 80 m (260 ft)

Population
  - Total: 9,216
  - Density: 18.85/km^{2} (48.81/sq mi)

Languages
  - Official: Malayalam, English
- Time zone: UTC+5:30 (IST)
- PIN: 680721 (Vettilappara P.O.)
- Telephone code: 0480
- Vehicle registration: KL-64

Athirappilly is a Grama Panchayat with 489.00 km^{2} area in Chalakudy Taluk, Thrissur district in Kerala, India. It is located 52 km from Thrissur city, 60 km northeast of Kochi city, 32 km northeast of Cochin International Airport, and 24 km from Chalakudy town.

== Wildlife ==
The Athirappilly Falls is situated 1000 ft above sea level on the Chalakudy river, at the entrance to the Sholayar ranges of the Western Ghats, Athirappalli is a scenic combination of forests and little streams. Falling from a height of 80 feet, this is one of the largest waterfalls in the state. Many endangered and endemic species of flora and fauna are found in the forests of the Athirapilly-Vazhachal area. This area is the only place in the Western Ghats where four endangered hornbill species are seen. The Western Ghats is one of the most important biodiversity hot spot in the world. This valuable natural world is already degraded by mining and hydro electric projects. Environmentalists claim that Athirapally is a one-of its-kind riparian ecosystem in Kerala. V.S. Vijayan, Chairman of the Kerala State Biodiversity Board and former Director of the Salim Ali Centre for Ornithology and Natural History (SACON), Coimbatore, has been quoted in Down to Earth magazine as affirming that the Vazhachal forest division is the second most biodiverse area in the State. The International Bird Association has declared it an "Important Bird Area" and the Asian Nature Conservation Foundation has recommended that the area should be declared a sanctuary or a national park, he points out.

The Wildlife Trust of India says it represents one of India's best elephant conservation efforts. "Any disruption to this fragile ecosystem will spell disaster," says Vijayan.

== Tourism ==
Athirappilly is popular among tourists. Athirappilly Falls is one of the places to visit in Kerala. Another popular waterfall to visit is the Vazhachal Falls. Athirappilly Falls is a part of Chalakudy river and it is approximately 80 feet in height. Athirappilly is easily reachable from Chalakudy by taking a vehicle for rent or by bus from the Chalakudy private bus terminal. Kauthuka Park is a small eco-tourism park located near Athirappilly, featuring nature-based installations and educational exhibits.

=== Maniratnam film location ===
Tamil film director, Maniratnam, has used this location as a filming site for several of his productions. Raavanan was filmed extensively here. The movies Dil Se.., Kannathil Muthamittal, Iruvar, Guru have songs shot here.

"Arjuna Arjuna" song featuring Sarathkumar and Namitha was shot in this location. The rain song ("Adada Mazhaida") Tamil movie featuring Karthi and Tamannaah, was shot at the Athirappilly waterfalls in Kerala. Punnagaimannan and captain prabakaran also shot here. Karthi and Anushka Shetty movie Alex Pandian’s Anushka Shetty kidnap scene was shot in Athirappilly.

== Hydroelectric project ==
The history of Athirappilly Hydro Electric Project dates back to 1982 when the Kerala State Electricity Board proposing a twin project such as AHEP at 120MW installed capacity and Poringal Right Bank hydro electric project. It was to include a dam 23 metres (75 ft) high and 311 metres (1,020 ft) wide on the Chalakudy River in the Vazhachal Forest Division about 5 kilometres (3 mi) upstream of Athirappilly Falls and 400 metres (1,312 ft) upstream of Vazhachal Rapids (Vazhachal Falls). However, environmental groups and people's collectives opposed the project on grounds that it would damage the environment, infringe on human rights, and threaten tourism. Though it was not their main concern, critics also noted that if the entire course of the river were diverted to make electricity, the Athirappilly-Vazhachal waterfalls could dry up. To avoid damaging the falls, the KSEB proposed adjusting the water releases to maintain the falls. The debate continued in 2007. Environmentalists also expressed concern over whether the proposed hydroelectric project at Athirappilly waterfalls would lead to displacement and eventual extinction of the primitive tribal group, `Kadars,' in the area. In 2005, the Kerala Ministry of Environment and Forests approved the project on the basis of a report by Water and Power Consultancy Services (India) Ltd. (WAPCOS), an environmental impact assessment (EIA) agency. In 2006, the Kerala High Court quashed the clearance and ordered another public hearing. The debate continued the following years.

On 29 January 2011, the chairman of the Western Ghats Ecology Expert Panel (WGEEP) Madhav Gadgil opined that the Environment Impact Assessment (EIA) of the Athirappilly hydel power project was not properly carried out and 70% of it is bogus. The panel, appointed by the Union Ministry of Environment and Forests, was asked to look into and give recommendations on various projects in the Western Ghats such as the hydroelectric projects in Gundiya in Karnataka and Athirappilly in Kerala and the overall development projects in Ratnagiri and Sindhudurg districts of Maharashtra. Gadgil said that the proposed Athirappilly hydro-electric project cannot be approved until the Forest Rights Act is implemented in its true spirit for the Kadar tribal community of the area and also no comprehensive study had been carried out so far on the natural riparian forest vegetation along the Western Ghats. On 14 June 2011, Union Minister for Environment and Forests Jairam Ramesh said his ministry would not grant approval to the Athirappilly hydro electric project. The Minister also stated "When states are denied such projects on larger and long-term environmental considerations, they are entitled to some sort of green bonus," The first part of WGEEP report was submitted to the Ministry on 31 August. The Western Ghats Ecology Expert Panel (WGEEP), on 6 September 2011 recommended to the Union Ministry of Environment and Forests against granting permission to carry out any construction activities at the sensitive Athirappilly-Vazhachal region. The panel, which submitted its report to Union Environment Minister Jayanti Natarajan in the Capital, named Athirappilly as one of the 18 eco-sensitive localities in the state.

A former member of KSEB with generation project, K Radhakrishnan, opined that WGEEP report was biased and the project was eco-friendly doing minimum damage to environment and forests, and with the lack of computational model when rainfall is decreasing by the effect of El Niño. Electricity Pensioners Welfare Association a forum of senior power personnel of Kerala headed by K Radhakrishnan viewed the Gadgil panel report as unproductive and overly concerned about environmental issues. Of late The Central Water commission has given approval to the project if the project doesn't affect the ecological balance, could maintain a flow for the waterfalls without defacing it or doesn't bring out any socio-cultural disputes. In 2016, Kerala Chief minister and Minister for power, Pinarayi Vijayan has indicated that they will consider implementation of the project disregard of the public opinion that rises from emotional sentiment. Environmental activists opposing the project and even by Left sympathizers, criticized the government's proceedings, for making public announcements in the cabinet without any consensus on the issue and it shouldn't be based on winning any previous grudge or proving judgmental validity. When first the project came forward Communist party of Kerala was against this project and surveys conducted among people by television channels also polled negative response. The hydel project is also reported to be anti-people and only would harm the state's interest when it takes away water from an existing irrigation system, which covers 20,000 acres of farmland downstream and about 5 lakh people reportedly depend upon the river for drinking and irrigation purposes. But experienced and retired inclined members of KSEB like K. Radhakrishnan, who have been campaigning for the implementation of the Athirappilly hydroelectric project for long has welcomed the decision. Power Survey Report estimate the state's power requirement to reach at 6500 MW by 2022. Former Principal Chief Conservator of Forest T M Manoharan, who was the Chairman of the Kerala State Electricity Board opposed the project citing the harm it could cause to the environment and ecology of the area. Other studies for the feasibility of the project was also negative like the report in 2007 by B S Vijayan, Kerala State Biodiversity Board also pointed out that the power project would adversely affect the ecology of the area. Jairam Ramesh, Former Environment Minister said this decision to be a "perfect recipe for ecological disaster."

According to a KSEB member and former executive engineer Augustine Xavier opined that ideally the state's annual per capita consumption should be 5000 units (kWh). For this to be achieved, the state power consumption should increase to 1,65,000 million units yearly. At the moment, the state's yearly consumption is just over 23,000 million units. In this scenario a mere 200 million units will be like a drop in the ocean. M. Sivasankar, KSEB chairman and MD said the crisis could be amended through the commissioning of a 2000 MW super thermal power station, which uses an environment-friendly super critical boiler. 1200-MW Cheemeni Power Project is such a stalled project pending implementation studies and lobbying central government with development requirements. Reports and public polls is in consensus with seeking alternative sources for achieving a semblance of self-sufficiency in terms of electricity requirements than investing time and money on nonstrategic myopic hydel projects.

== See also ==
- Thrissur
- Cochin
- Chalakudy
- Athirappilly Falls
