= Athirappilly Falls =

Waterfall in Athirapilly, India

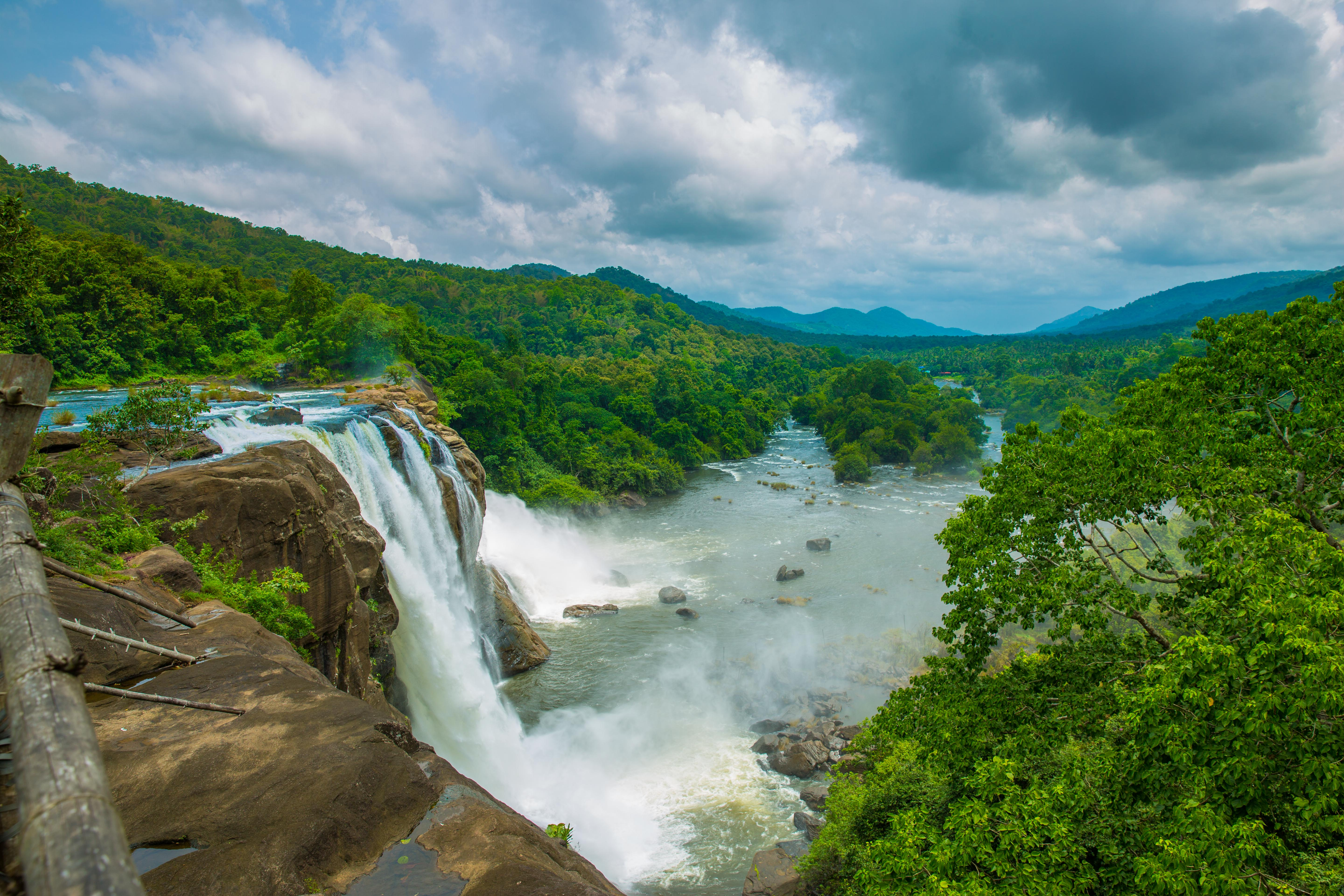
- Interactive map of Athirappilly Falls
- Location: Athirappilly, Chalakudy Taluk, Thrissur District, Kerala, India
- Coordinates: 10°17′5″N 76°34′7″E
- Type: Segmented
- Elevation: 120 m (390 ft)
- Total height: 25 m (82 ft)
- Number of drops: 4
- Longest drop: 51 m (167 ft)
- Total width: 100 m (330 ft)
- Watercourse: Chalakkudi River
- Average flow rate: 52 m^{3}/s (1,836 cu ft/s)

Athirappilly Falls (Malayalam: [ɐd̪iɾɐpːiɭːi]) is situated in Athirappilly Panchayat in Chalakudy Taluk of Thrissur District in Kerala, India on the Chalakudy River, which originates from the upper reaches of the Western Ghats at the entrance to the Sholayar ranges. It is the largest waterfall in Kerala, which stands tall at 83.7 feet. Just a short drive from Athirappilly is the Vazhachal Falls, which is close to dense green forests that are home to many endangered and endemic species of flora and fauna.

Athirappilly Falls is the largest waterfall in Kerala and is nicknamed "The Niagara of South India".

Controversy about a state-proposed hydroelectric dam on the Chalakudy River above the waterfalls began in the 1990s and continued through 2017.

== River ==
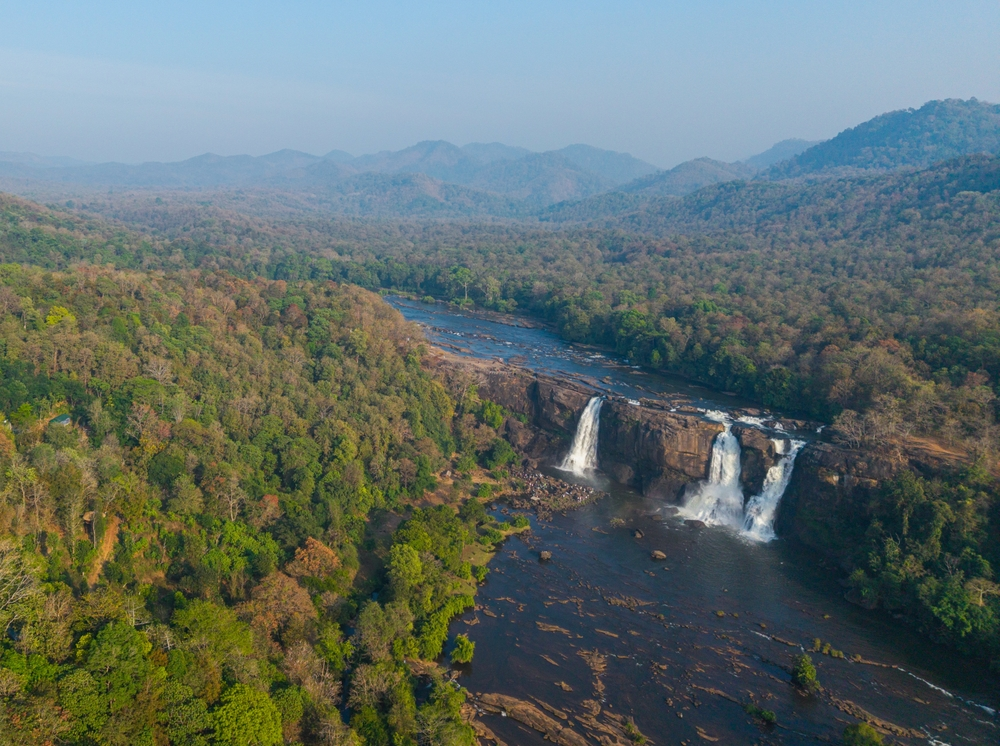
Aerial photograph

The 145 kilometres (90 mi) long Chalakudy River, originates in the Anaimalai mountains of the Western Ghats and flows through the Vazhachal Forest toward the Arabian Sea. The river starts off smooth but becomes more turbulent as it nears Athirapilly. At Athirappilly Falls, the water surges around big rocks and cascades down in three separate plumes. Below the falls, the river remains turbulent for about 1 kilometre (0.62 mi) until it reaches Kannamkuzhi, from where it calms and flows smoothly until reaching the dam at Thumpoormuzhi.

== Wildlife ==
Forest wildlife in the area includes the Indian elephant, Bengal tiger, Indian leopard, gaur, sambar, and lion-tailed macaque.

Plantations in the area contain teak, bamboo, and eucalyptus. Environmentalists claim that Athirappilly is a one-of-its-kind riparian ecosystem in Kerala. V.S. Vijayan, Chairman of the Kerala State Biodiversity Board and former Director of the Salim Ali Centre for Ornithology and Natural History (SACON), Coimbatore, has been quoted in Down to Earth magazine as affirming that the Vazhachal forest division is the second most biodiverse area in the State. The International Bird Association has declared it an ‘Important Bird Area' and the Asian Nature Conservation Foundation has recommended that the area should be declared a sanctuary or a national park, he points out. The Wildlife Trust of India says it represents one of India's best elephant conservation efforts. "Any disruption to this fragile ecosystem will spell disaster," says Vijayan. The river provides a habitat for 85 species of freshwater fishes. Among these, 35 are endemic species.

== Tourism ==
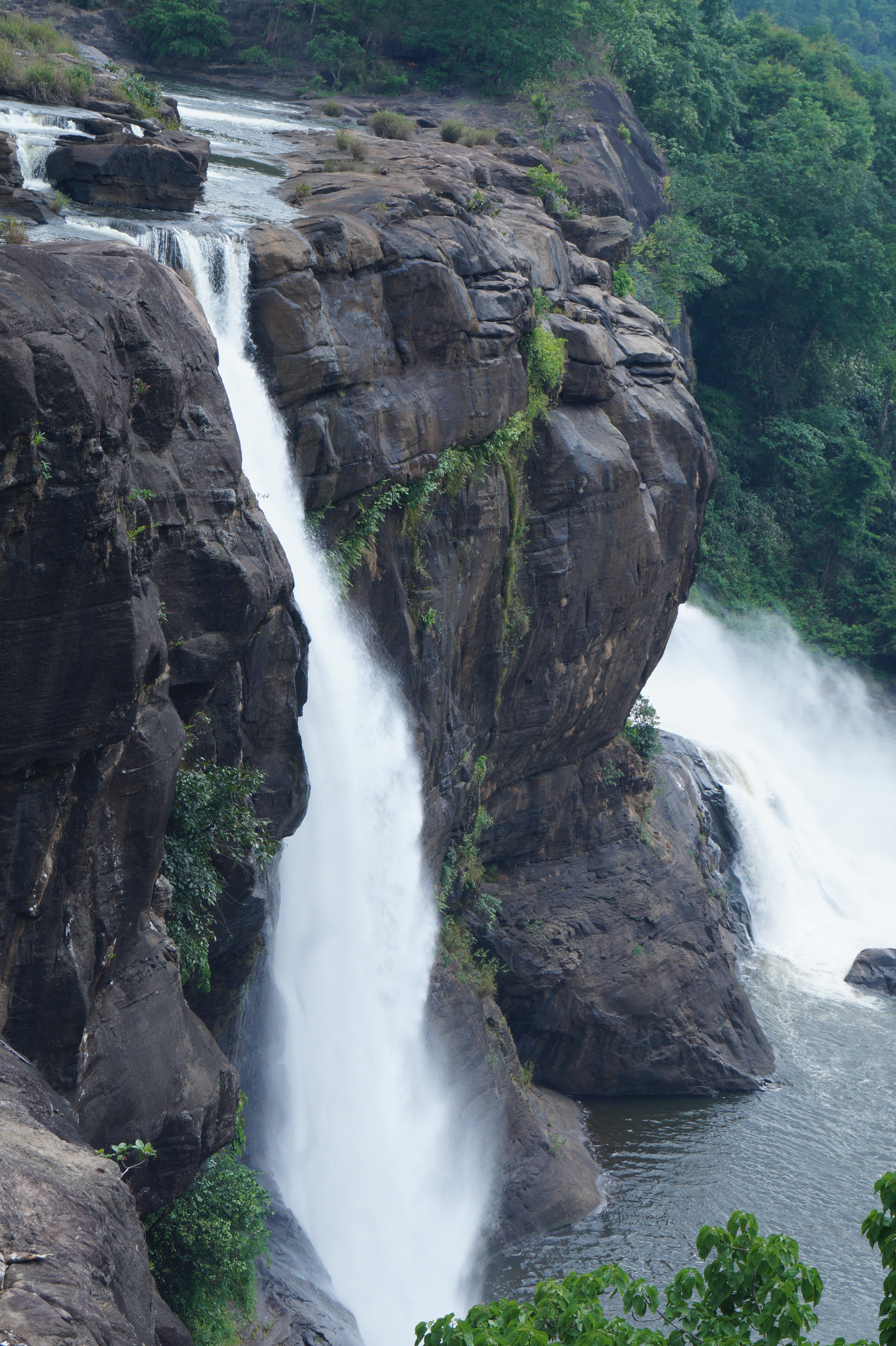
View from the nearest allowed point

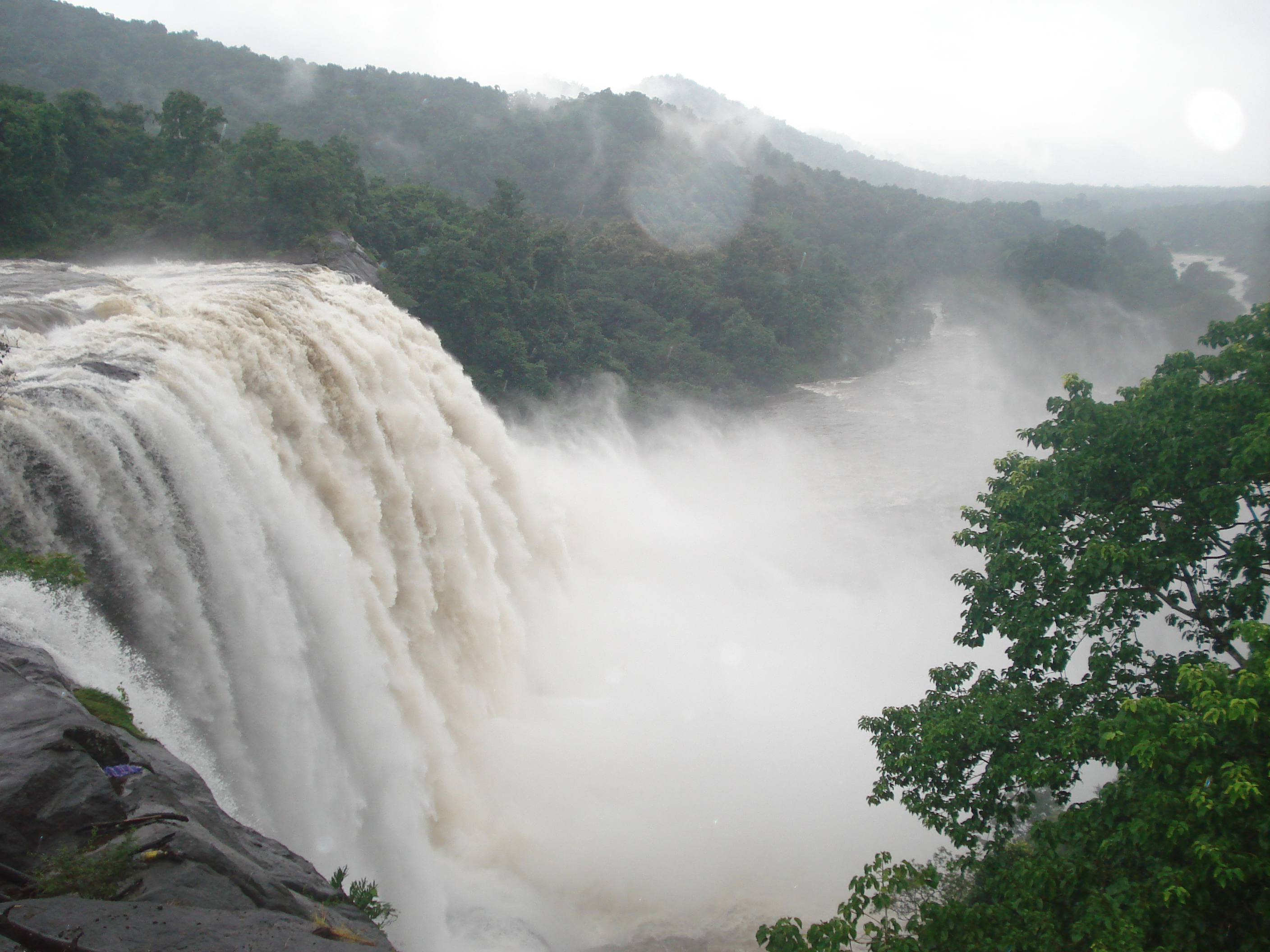
During rainy season

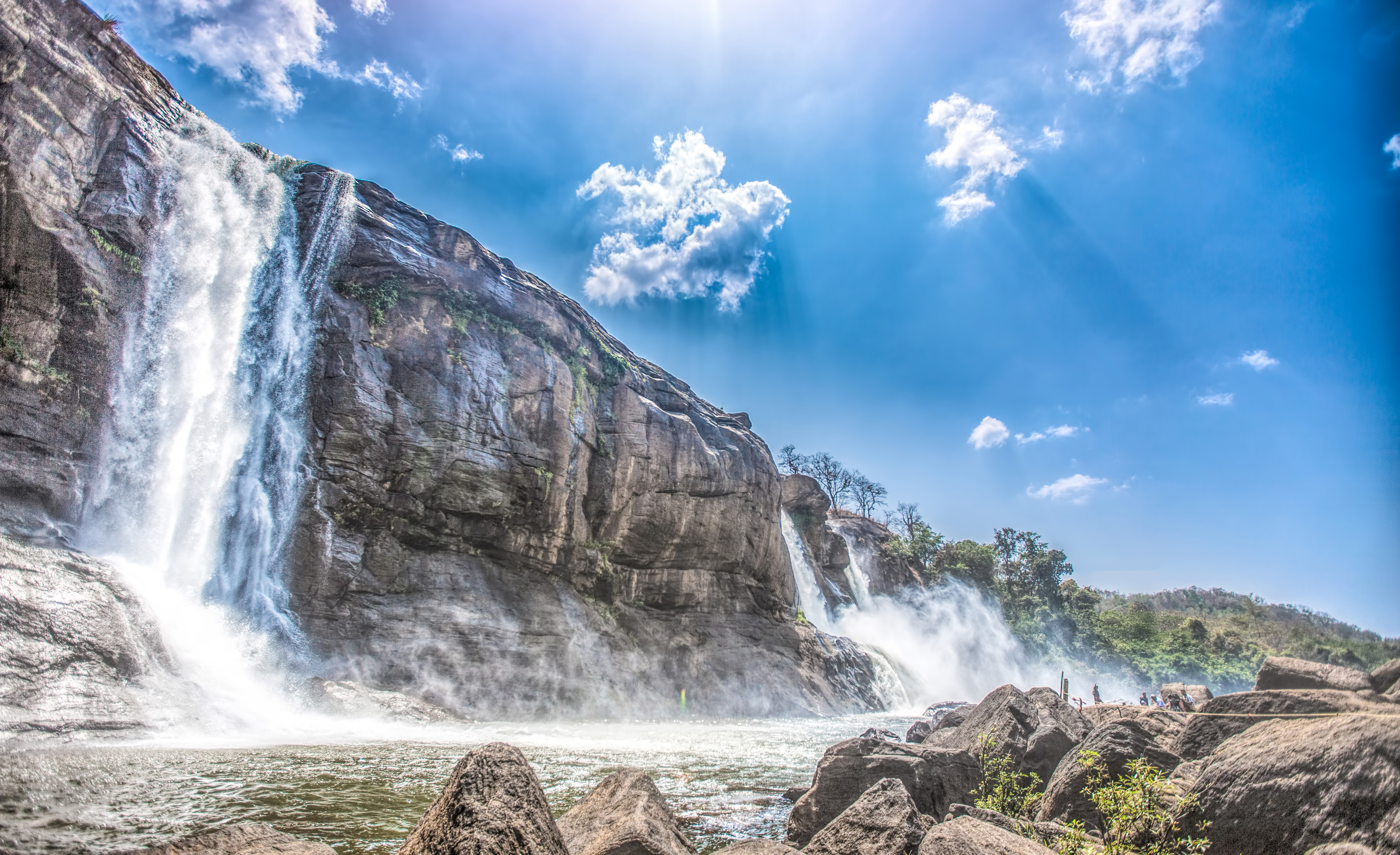
View of Athirappilly waterfalls from below

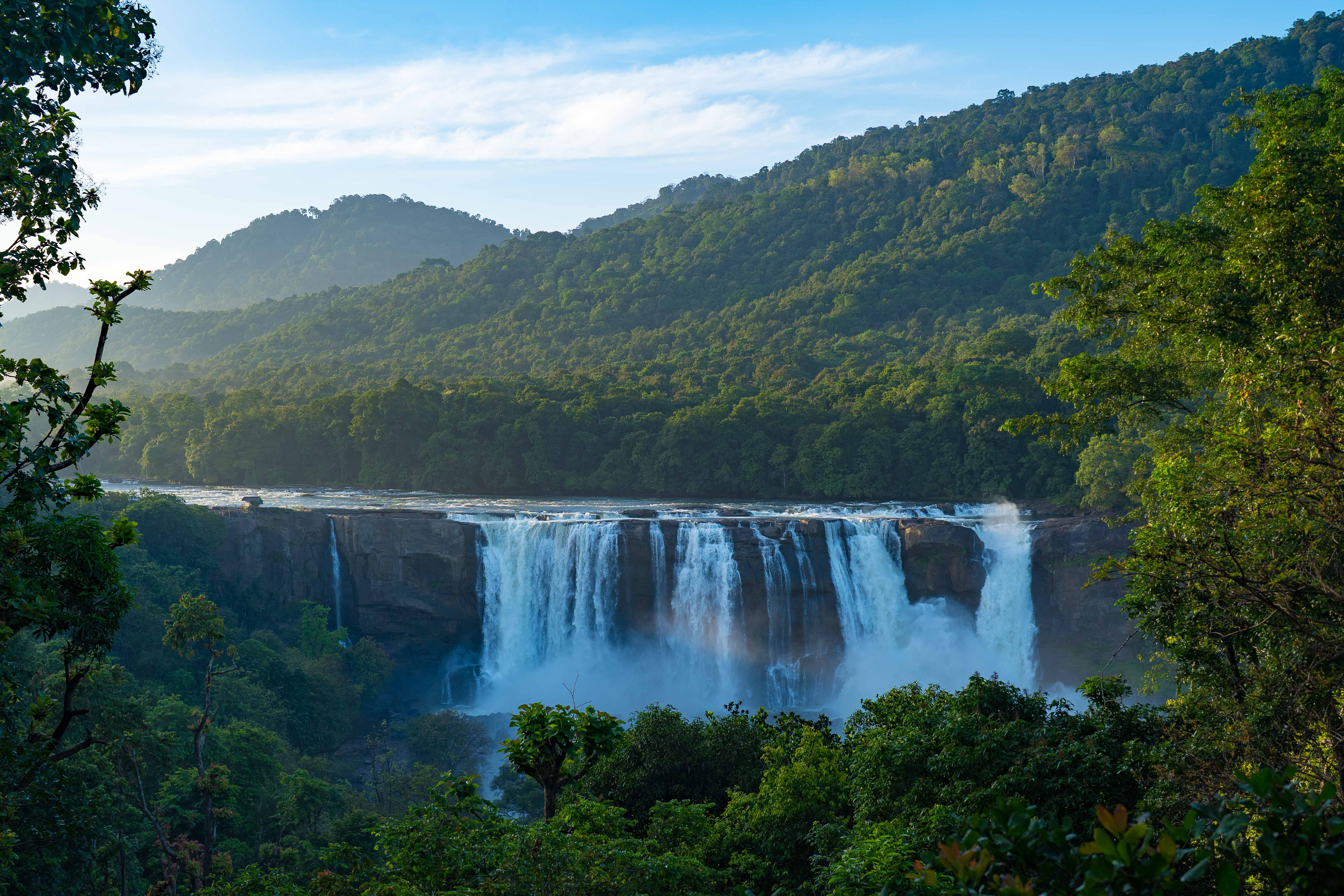
The lushy green forests of Western Ghats surrounding the Athirapally Waterfalls after the monsoon rains.

The railway station nearest to Athirappilly Falls, 30 kilometres (19 mi) to the west, is Chalakkudy Railway Station, and the nearest airport is Cochin International Airport, about 55 kilometres (34 mi) southwest of the waterfall and 58 kilometres (36 mi) south of city of Thrissur. Athirappilly is easily reachable from Chalakkudy by taxi or by bus from the Chalakkudy bus terminal. Athirappilly is situated on a state highway connecting Tamil Nadu and Kerala, in a thick forest and so night travel is not permitted. The checkpoints at either end close by 6:30 pm IST prior to which all vehicles have to exit through either checkpoint.

The journey from Chalakkudy to the Athirappilly Falls passes through a landscape of winding roads, small villages and lush green trees. Visitors can reach the top of the waterfall via a paved path that leads through thick bamboo clusters. From Angamaly, the route is in the midst of an Oil Palm Reserve at Ezhattumugham tourism village. A steep narrow path or a wide staired path can be taken to the bottom of the falls. The falls attract visitors from across India, especially during the monsoon months (June–September). About 7 million tourists visit the falls and the Vazhachal picnic spot each year.

== Jungle safari ==
Daily jungle safari trips are organized by Thrissur District Tourism Promotion Council with Athirappilly Destination Management Council from Chalakudy to Malakkappara.

== Movies ==
Athirappilly falls has been used as a location for several Malayalam films as well as in other regional language films in India

- The fall is featured in old Malayalam movie Ponnapuram Kotta (1973), specially the song "Valliyoor Kaavile", starring Prem Nasir, Vijayasree.
- Scenes from the Malayalam movie Vanadevatha (1976) starring Prem Nazir, Madhushala
- Scenes from the Malayalam movie Anuragi (1988) starring Mohanlal, Urvashi
- A major portion of the 1986 Tamil movie Punnagai Mannan was shot near the falls, the falls itself playing a role in it. It made the falls so popular in Tamil Nadu that it got the nickname "Punnagai Mannan Falls".
- The song "Koyaliya Gati Hai Payaliya Chhankati Hai" from the film "Jungle Love" in 1990
- The falls were featured in Mani Ratnam's film Dil Se starring Shahrukh Khan, Manisha Koirala, and Preity Zinta, and featuring the song "Jiya Jale/Nenjinile".
- The falls are also famous as a site location for "Narumugaye Narumugaye", a song from the Tamil film Iruvar, acted by Mohanlal and actress Aishwarya Rai.
- This waterfall is also a major location for songs like "Behne De" and most scenes in the Hindi film Raavan and Tamil film Raavanan.
- The song "Adada Mazhaida" from Paiyaa featuring Karthi and Tamannaah was shot in this location.
- The song from Kannathil Muthamittal of the same name was shot here.
- The song "Kurukku Siruthavale" from Mudhalvan starring Arjun Sarja and Manisha Koirala, and "Chalo Chalain Mitwa" from its 2001 remake Nayak, starring Anil Kapoor and Rani Mukerji
- The song "Sunta Hai Tera Khuda" from Pukar, starring Anil Kapoor
- The song "Mainave Mainave" from Tamil film Vaanathaippola, starring Vijayakanth and Vineetha
- The song "Achi lagti ho" from Kuch Naa Kaho
- The song "Kudamullakkadavil" from the Malayalam film Vellithira starring Prithviraj Sukumaran, Navya Nair
- Climax scenes from Lajja starring "Ajay Devgn" and "Manisha Koirala"
- Sirf Tum, starring Sanjay Kapoor and Sushmita Sen
- A song in Tamil movie Samurai starring Vikram
- Songs from Saaya (2003), starring John Abraham
- A scene from Madras Cafe starring John Abraham
- The song from Tamil movie Maanasthan starring R. Sarathkumar and Sakshi Shivanand
- Scenes from Anandabhadram starring Manoj K Jayan and Prithviraj Sukumaran
- Song from 4 the People starring Bharath and Gopika
- A scene from the Hindi movie Mela
- The opening scene of the Tamil movie Kandukondain Kandukondain
- A few scenes in the Hindi movie Agyaat
- A scene from the Tamil movie Villu
- Few scenes from the Telugu movie Priyuralu (1998) starring Sakshi Sivanand and Vineeth
- The song "Bambara Kannu" from Tamil movie Madhurey
- A scene from the Tamil movie Vettaikaaran
- The song "Rosappoo Chinna Rosappoo" from Suryavamsam
- "Arjuna Arjuna", a song featuring R. Sarathkumar and Namitha in the movie Aei
- "Evo Evevo", a song from Telugu film Lovely
- The song "Baarish" and climax scenes from Yaariyan (2014)
- The song "Oru Kannil vegam" from Samar (2013)
- The song "Oh Kamini" and a scene from Rang Rasiya; Randeep Hooda and Rashaana Shah
- The Telugu movie Brindavanam (2010)
- The song "Egire Mabbullona" from Happy (2006), Telugu
- The song "Ayyo Ayyo Dhanayya" from Ready (2008)
- Scenes from the Tamil movie Alex Pandian
- The song "Aaayi re aayi re khushi" from Khushi (2003, Hindi), starring Kareena Kapoor
- The title song of the Hindi movie Chura Liyaa Hai Tumne
- The song "Sha La La" from the movie Ghilli (2004) starring Vijay and Trisha
- The song "Vaana Chinukulu" from the Telugu movie Seethamma Vakitlo Sirimalle Chettu
- The English movie Before the Rains (2007)
- The English movie Pirate's Blood (2008)
- The song "Thuppakki Penne" from the movie Peraanmai (2009) starring Jayam Ravi and Sai Dhanshika
- Climax scene from Malayalam movie Three Kings (2011) starring Jayasurya, Indrajith Sukumaran, and Kunchacko Boban
- Scenes from the Malayalam movie Cousins
- Scenes and a song from Baahubali, India's biggest motion picture, a 2015 Tamil/Telugu bilingual movie
- The Tamil movie Puli (2015)
- "Rock On Bro", a song from Janatha Garage (2016, Telugu)
- A song "Unnavitta Yaarum Yenakilla" from the film Seemaraja starring Sivakarthikeyan and Samantha Ruth Prabhu
- A scene from Malayalam movie Odiyan (2018) starring Mohanlal
- A song from Telugu movie Husharu (2018) starring Tejus Kancherla and Priya Vadlamani
- A song "Maahiya" from the film Oru Adaar Love (2019) starring Roshan Abdul Rahoof, Priya Prakash Varrier and Noorin Shereef
- Climax scene from Malayalam movie Pathinettam Padi (2019) starring Mammootty, Prithviraj Sukumaran and Arya
- "He's So Cute", a song from Sarileru Neekevvaru (2020, Telugu) starring Mahesh Babu, Rashmika Mandanna
- A scene from Telugu movie Sye Raa Narasimha Reddy starring Chiranjeevi
- Scenes from the Telugu movie Pushpa: The Rise
- Climax scene from the Tamil movie Kaathuvaakula Rendu Kaadhal (2022) starring Vijay Sethupathi, Nayanthara and Samantha Ruth Prabhu
- Climax scene from the Tamil movie Jailer (film) (2023) starring Rajinikanth and Vasanth Ravi
- Opening scene from Malayalam movie Bramayugam (2024) starring Mammootty, Arjun Ashokan and Siddharth Bharathan.
- Scenes from the Malayalam movie ARM (2024) starring Tovino Thomas, Krithi Shetty and Surabhi Lakshmi.
- Featured in movie uglies (2024) which was a netflix release.
- Climax scene from the Tamil movie Jailer 2 (2026) starring Rajinikanth and S. J. Suryah

== Hydroelectric project ==
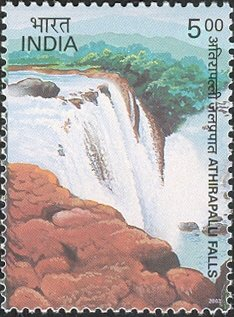
Stamp of India 2003 Athirapalli Falls

In 1994, the Kerala State Electricity Board (KSEB) proposed a 163-megawatt Athirappilly Hydro Electric Project. It was to include a dam 23 metres (75 ft) high and 311 metres (1,020 ft) wide on the Chalakudy River in the Vazhachal Forest Division about 5 kilometres (3 mi) upstream of Athirappilly Falls and 400 metres (1,312 ft) upstream of Vazhachal Rapids (Vazhachal Falls). However, environmental groups and people's collectives opposed the project on grounds that it would damage the environment, infringe on human rights, and threaten tourism. Though it was not their main concern, critics also noted that if the entire course of the river were diverted to make electricity, the Athirappilly-Vazhachal waterfalls could dry up. To avoid damaging the falls, the KSEB proposed adjusting the water releases to maintain the falls. The debate continued in 2007. Environmentalists also expressed concern over whether the proposed hydroelectric project at Athirappilly waterfalls would lead to displacement and eventual extinction of the primitive tribal group, 'Kadars,' in the area.

In 2005, the Kerala Ministry of Environment and Forests approved the project on the basis of a report by Water and Power Consultancy Services (India) Ltd. (WAPCOS), an environmental impact assessment (EIA) agency. In 2006, the Kerala High Court quashed the clearance and ordered another public hearing. The debate continued for the following years.

On 29 January 2011, the chairman of the Western Ghats Ecology Expert Panel (WGEEP) Madhav Gadgil opined that the Environment Impact Assessment (EIA) of the Athirappilly hydel power project was not properly carried out and 70% of it is bogus. The panel, appointed by the Union Ministry of Environment and Forests, was asked to look into and give recommendations on various projects in the Western Ghats such as the hydroelectric projects in Gundiya in Karnataka and Athirappilly in Kerala and the overall development projects in Ratnagiri and Sindhudurg districts of Maharashtra. Gadgil said that the proposed Athirappilly hydro-electric project cannot be approved until the Forest Rights Act is implemented in its true spirit for the Kadar tribal community of the area and also no comprehensive study had been carried out so far on the natural riparian forest vegetation along the Western Ghats. On 14 June 2011, Union Minister for Environment and Forests Jairam Ramesh said his ministry would not approve the Athirappilly hydroelectric project. The minister also stated, “When states are denied such projects on larger and long-term environmental considerations, they are entitled to some sort of green bonus." The first part of the WGEEP report was submitted to the Ministry on 31 August. The Western Ghats Ecology Expert Panel (WGEEP), on 6 September 2011 recommended to the Union Ministry of Environment and Forests against granting permission to carry out any construction activities at the sensitive Athirappilly-Vazhachal region. The panel, which submitted its report to Union Environment Minister Jayanti Natarajan in the capital, named Athirappilly as one of the 18 eco-sensitive localities (ESL) in the state. But K. Radhakrishnan, a former member (generation), of KSEB, has opined that this panel report was highly biased with vested interests and the project was eco-friendly doing minimum damage to the environment and forests because KSEB itself has its own vested interests if the Dam Project takes life. While there are reports from renowned experts from the Kerala State Biodiversity Board that the power project would adversely affect the ecology of the area and the estimated power output would be dependable upon the rainfall and dry summer seasons, which is undependable in its own way. M. Sivasankar, a KSEB chairman and MD states the need of more environment-friendly power projects with lower operating costs and higher output like supercritical boiler plants.

== See also ==
- Vazhachal Falls
- Charpa Falls
- List of waterfalls
- List of waterfalls in India
- List of waterfalls in India by height
- State Highway 21 (Kerala)
