= Vazhachal Falls =

Waterfall in Kerala, India

- വാഴച്ചാൽ വെള്ളച്ചാട്ടം
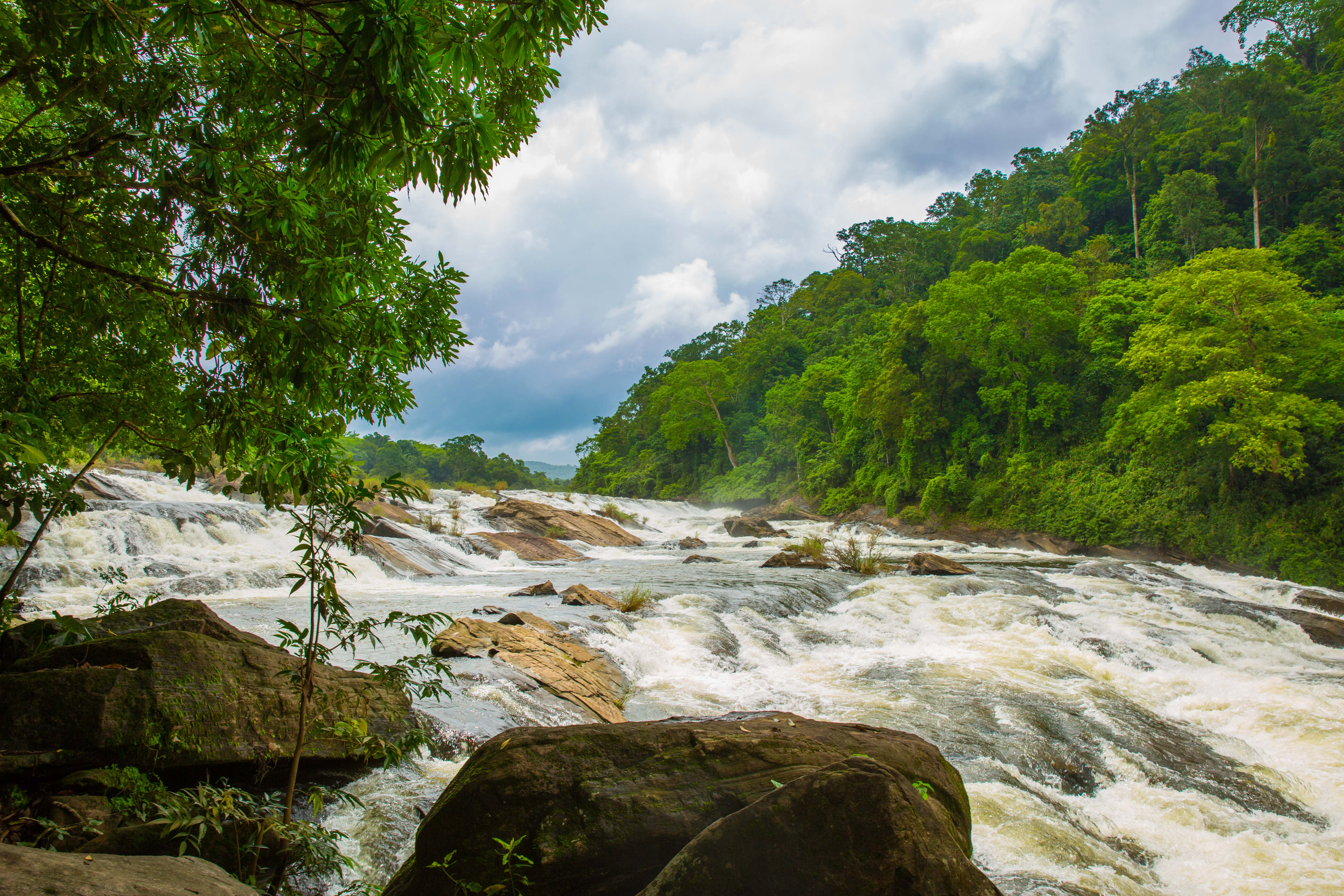
- Vazhachal Falls
- Interactive map of Vazhachal Falls
- Location: Thrissur District, Kerala, India
- Coordinates: 10°18′5.12″N 76°35′33.95″E
- Elevation: 120 m (390 ft)
- Watercourse: Chalakkudi River

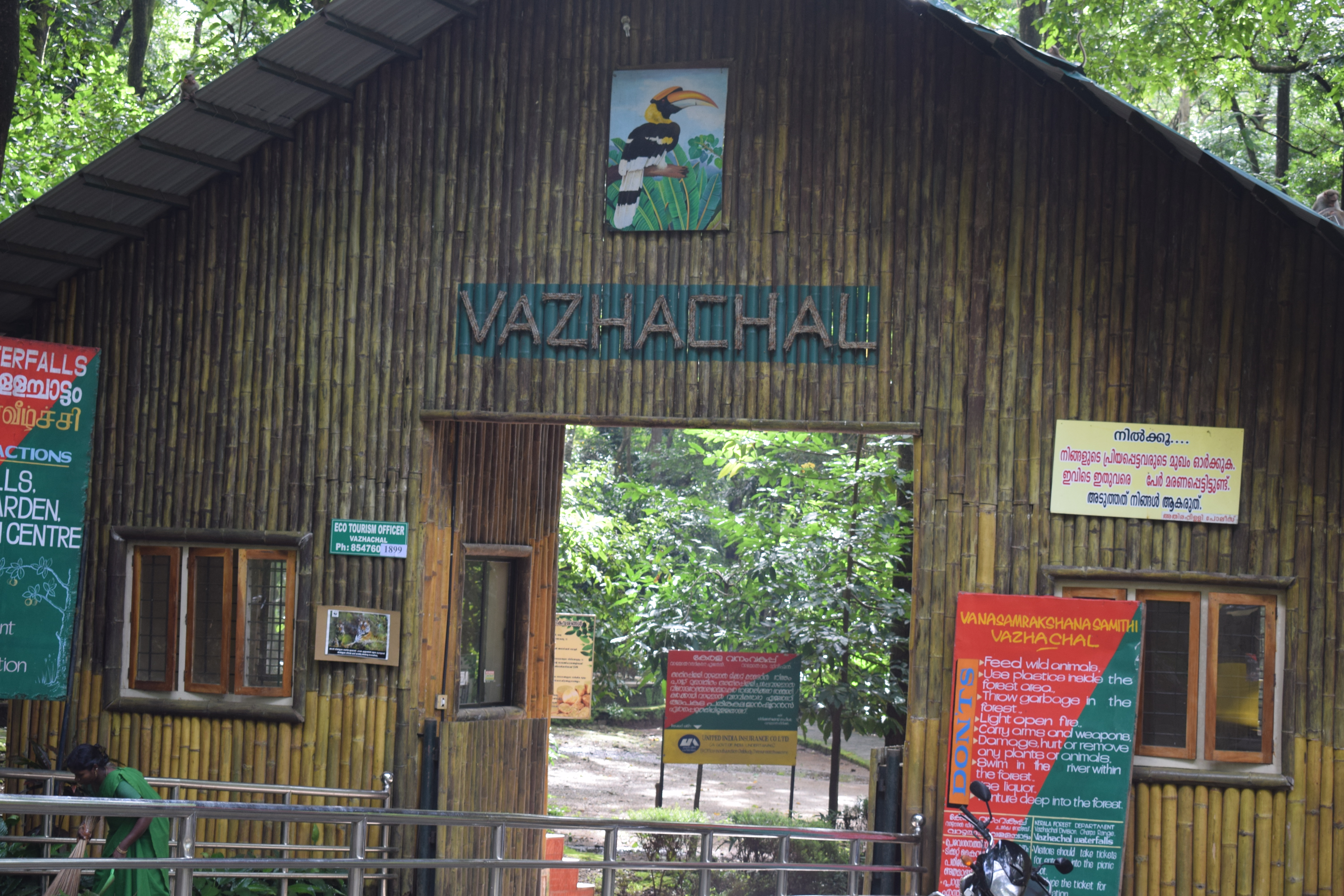
Entrance of Vazachal Water Falls

Vazhachal Falls is situated in Athirappilly Panchayath of Thrissur district in Kerala on the southwest coast of India. Located on the west-flowing Chalakudy River near the Vazhachal Forest Division and at the edge of the Sholayar ranges, it is just 5 km from entrance of Athirappilly Falls. It is located 36 km from Chalakudy.

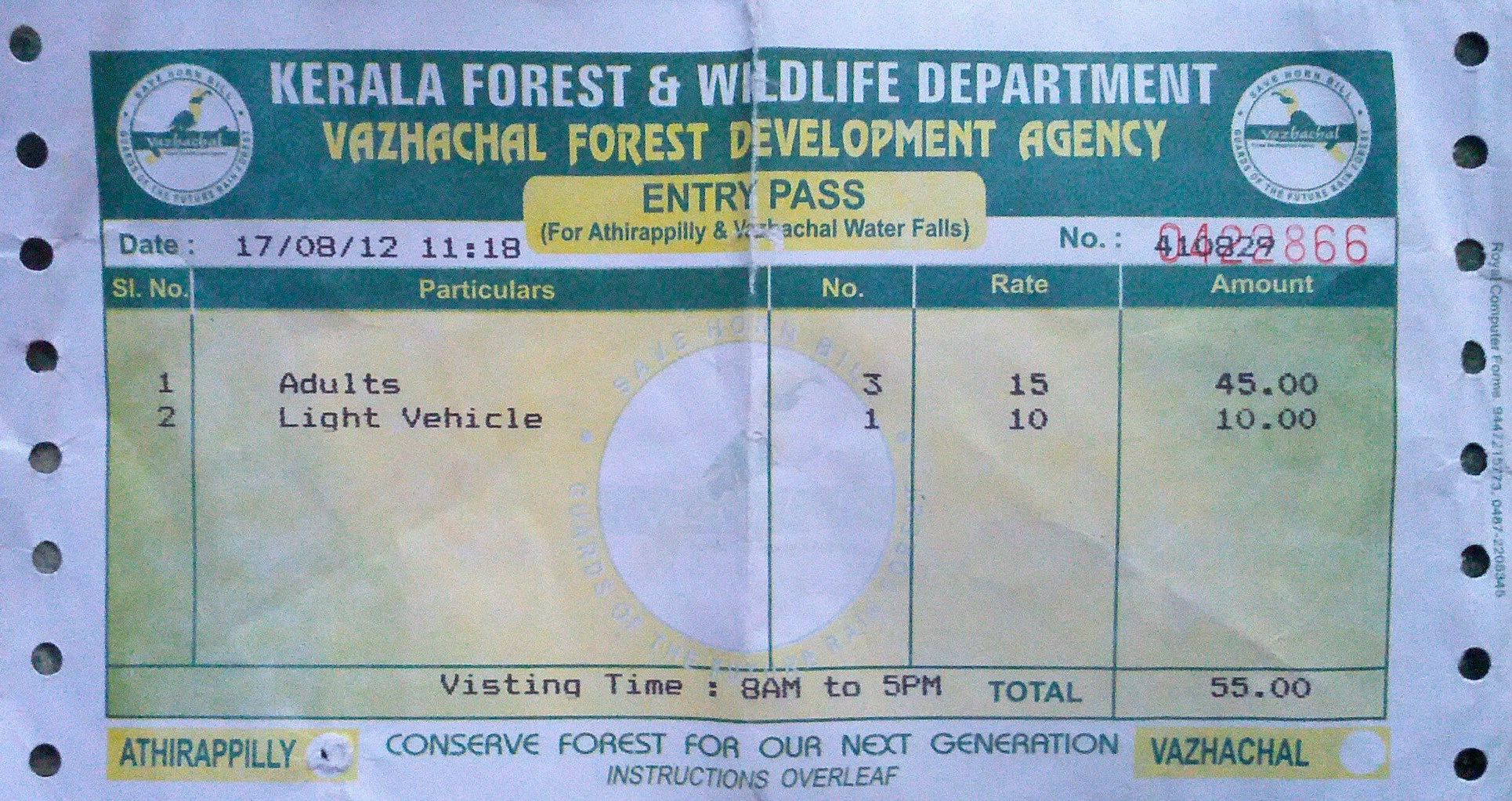
Entry pass to Vazhachal and Athirappilly Falls.

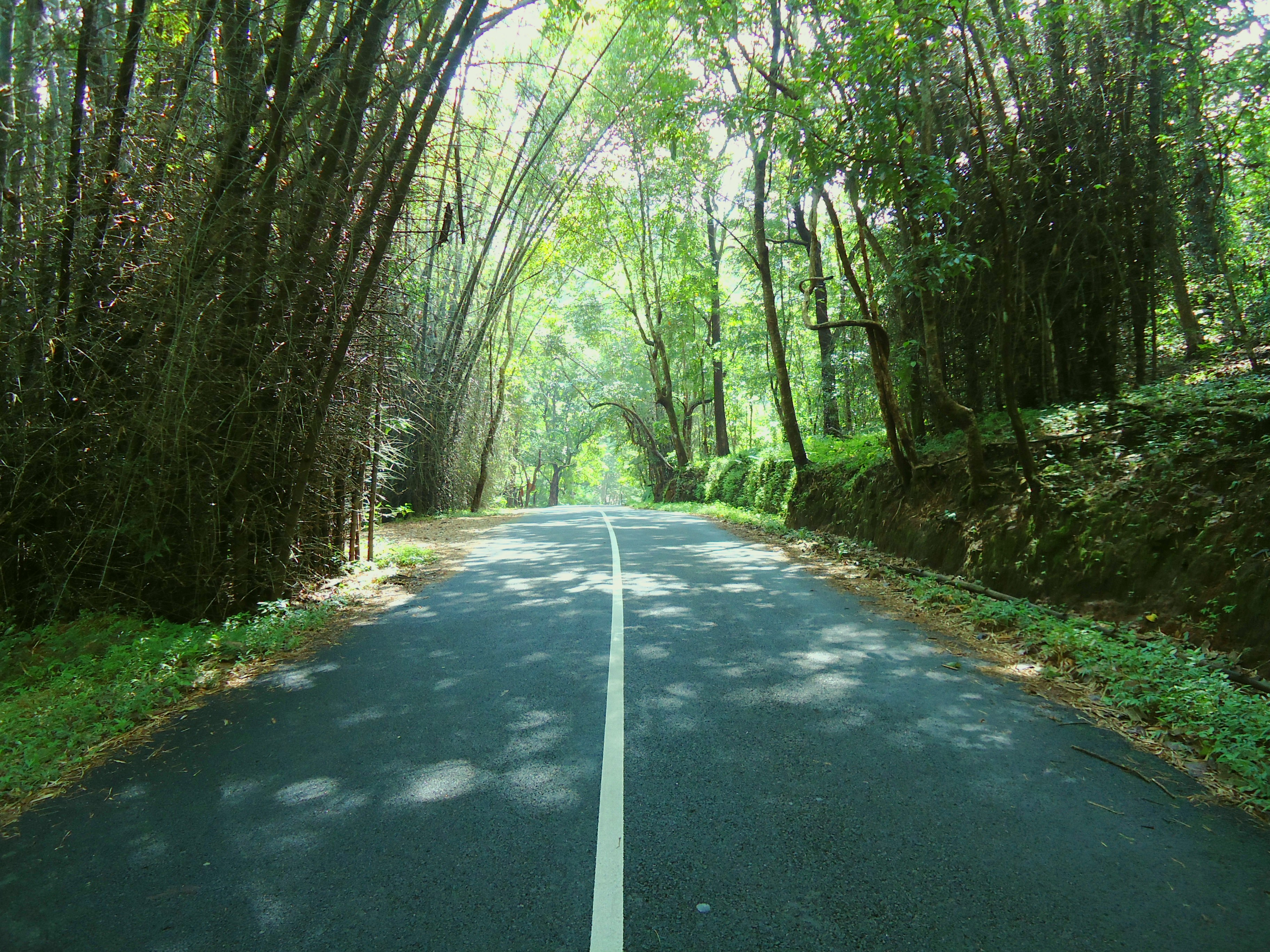
Way to Vazhachal From Athirappilly

== See also ==
- Athirappilly Falls
- Charpa Falls
- Chalakudy
- List of waterfalls
- List of waterfalls in India
- List of waterfalls in India by height
- State Highway 21 (Kerala)
