= Aishwarya Rao =

Personal information
- Born: 1993 or 1994 (age 30–31)

Sport
- Country: India
- Sport: Bowling
- Updated on 17 July 2013

Aishwarya Rao (born 1994) is an Indian professional ten-pin bowler based in Singapore.

== Career ==
Having started out as a hobby, Aishwarya Rao took to bowling professionally and won the Under-21 Junior National Championships in 2011. At the Senior National Championships in 2012, teaming up with the former national champion Prathima Hegde, she won her first senior doubles event and also the mixed doubles event with another former national champion Vijay Punjabi as her partner, in 2012. In the singles event, she won the second place behind Sabeena Saleem.
