= Chalakudy River =

River in Kerala, India

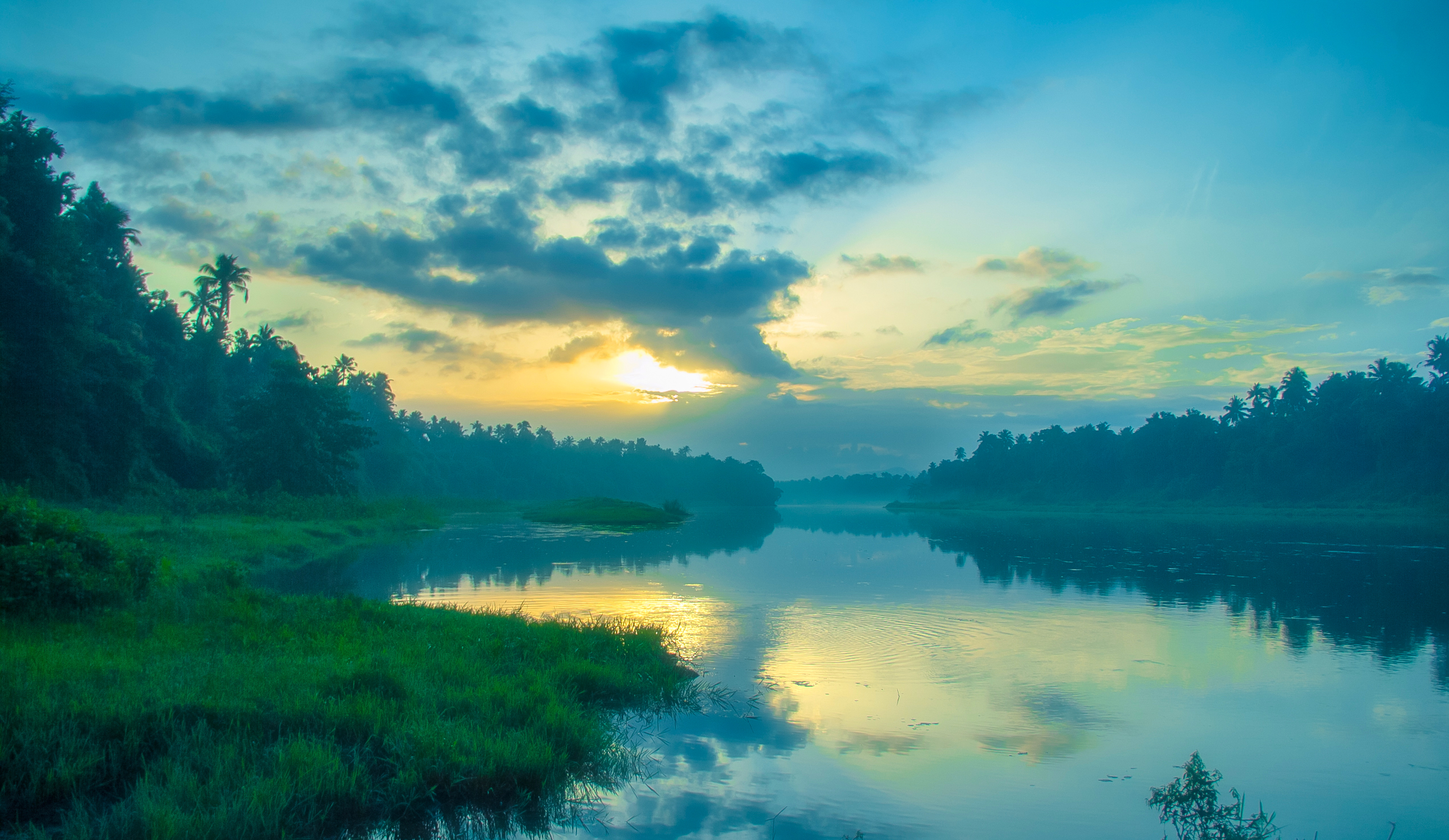
- Chalakudy bank on a summer sunrise

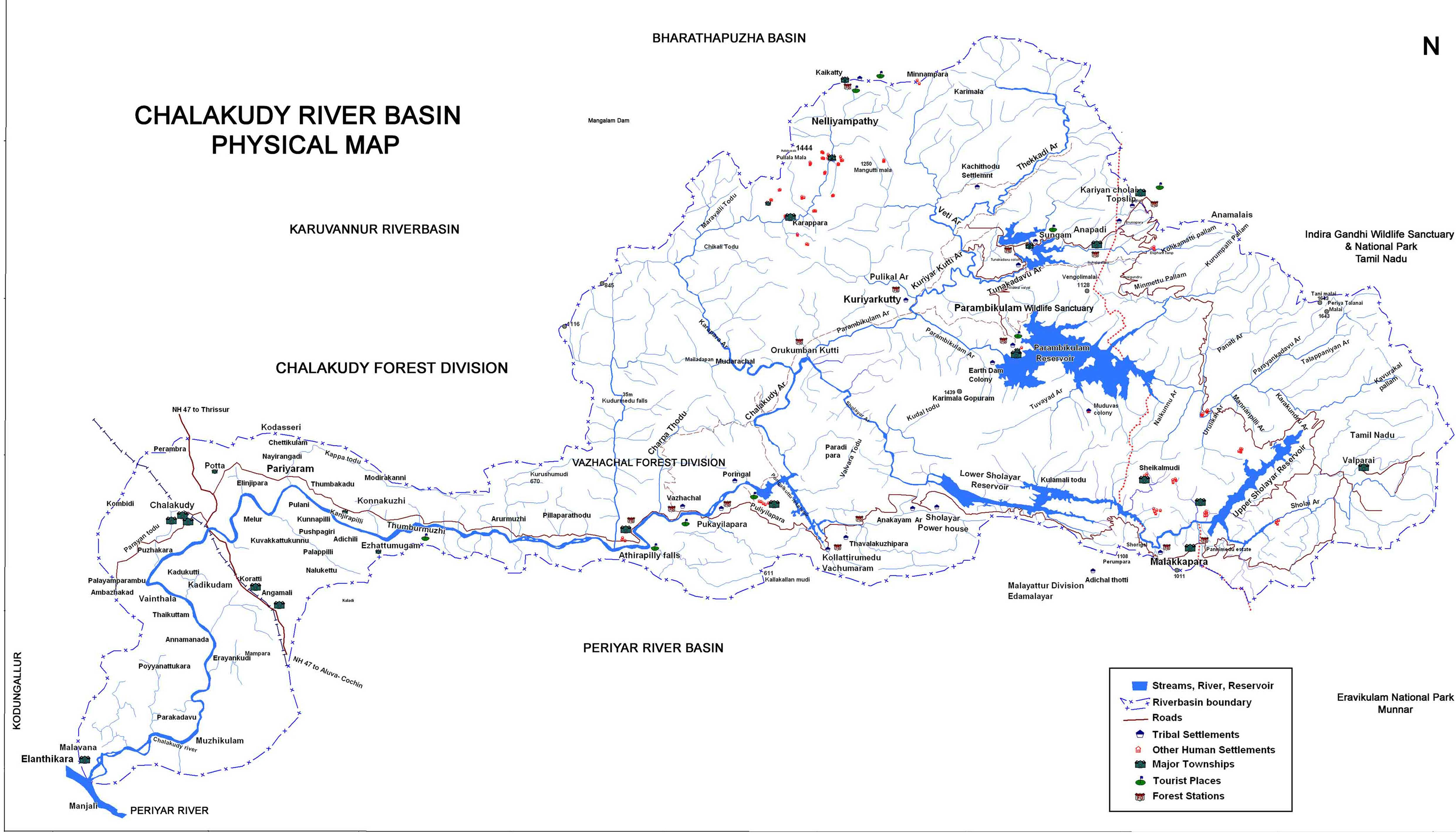
- Chalakudy River Basin Map
- Native name: ചാലക്കുടി പുഴ (Malayalam)

Location
- Country: India
- State: Kerala
- City: Chalakudy town

Physical characteristics
- Source: Anamalai Hills
  - location: Kerala/Tamil Nadu Border, India
  - coordinates: 10°22′00″N 77°07′30″E
  - elevation: 1,250 m (4,100 ft)
- Mouth: Periyar River
  - location: Puthanvelikkara, Kerala, India
  - coordinates: 10°09′44″N 76°15′56″E
  - elevation: 0 m (0 ft)
- Length: 145.5 km (90.4 mi)
- Basin size: 1,704 km^{2} (658 sq mi)
- Discharge
  - location: mouth
  - average: 52 m^{3}/s (1,800 cu ft/s)

Basin features
- Tributaries
  - right: Karappara River, Kuriarkutty Aar, Peruvarippallam Aar, Thunacadavu Aar, Sholayar River

Chalakudy River or Chalakudy Puzha is the fifth longest river in Kerala, India. The river flows through Thrissur district, Palakkad district and Ernakulam district of Kerala. The total drainage area of the river is 1704 km^{2}. Out of this, 1404 km^{2} lies in Kerala and the rest in Tamil Nadu. The length of the river is 145.5 km. Though Chalakudy River in strict geological sense is a tributary of the Periyar river, for all practical purposes it is treated as a separate river by Government and other agencies. The river has gained its name since it flows along the banks of the Chalakudy Town, the major settlement along the course of the river. It is perhaps the most unpolluted and pristine river in the state and even in India due to the limited amount of industries and wastage disposal around it. Chalakudy River and its basin area were one of the most affected rivers during the 2018 Kerala floods.

== Origin ==
Though the river has its origin in the Anamalai region of Tamil Nadu, it is actually a collection of some major tributaries originated from Parambikulam, Kuriyarkutti, Sholayar, Karapara and Anakayam in Kerala.

== Riparian vegetation ==
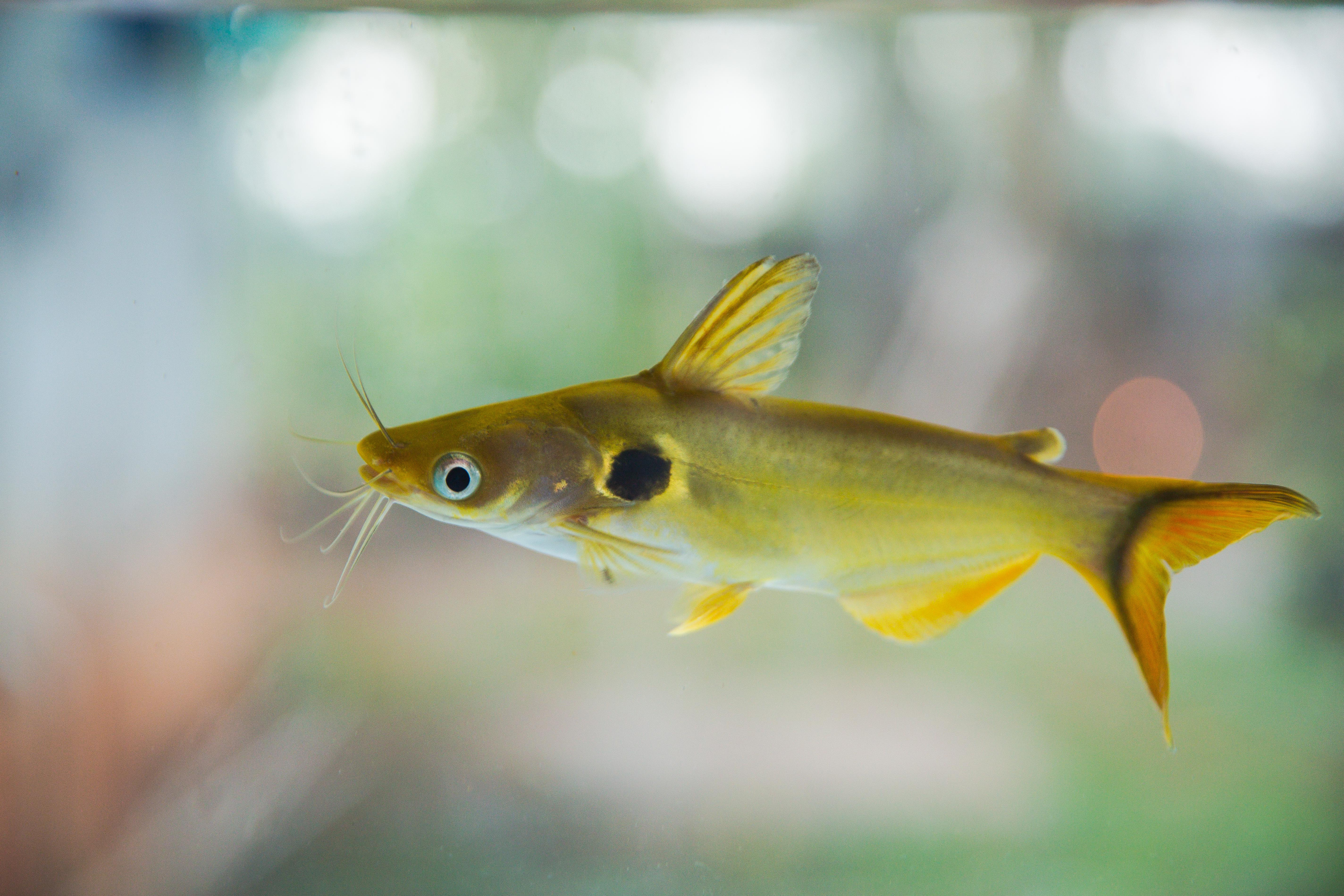
Sun Catfish known as Manjakoori (Horabagrus brachysoma) is found extensively in Chalakudy River

Chalakudy River is the one of very few rivers of Kerala with relics of riparian vegetation in substantial level. The major threat has been submergence due to reservoirs. The annual report of the National Bureau of Fish Genetic Resources Lucknow, mentioned that the Chalakudy River is the richest river in fish diversity perhaps in India. The riparian forests of the Chalakudy River have revealed the existence of a thick riparian vegetation of more than 10 metres width for a distance of 10.5 km downstream from Peringalkuth, covering an area of 58.5 hectares. Out of this, 26.4 hectares lie within the Vazachal area, including three large islands densely covered by riparian forests. The riparian forests of the area have been found to be characterised by the presence of typical riparian species of plants, in addition to evergreen and semi-evergreen species. Out of the 319 species of flowering plants identified from the study area, 24 are endemic species of the Western Ghats and 10 are rare and endangered.

== Fauna ==
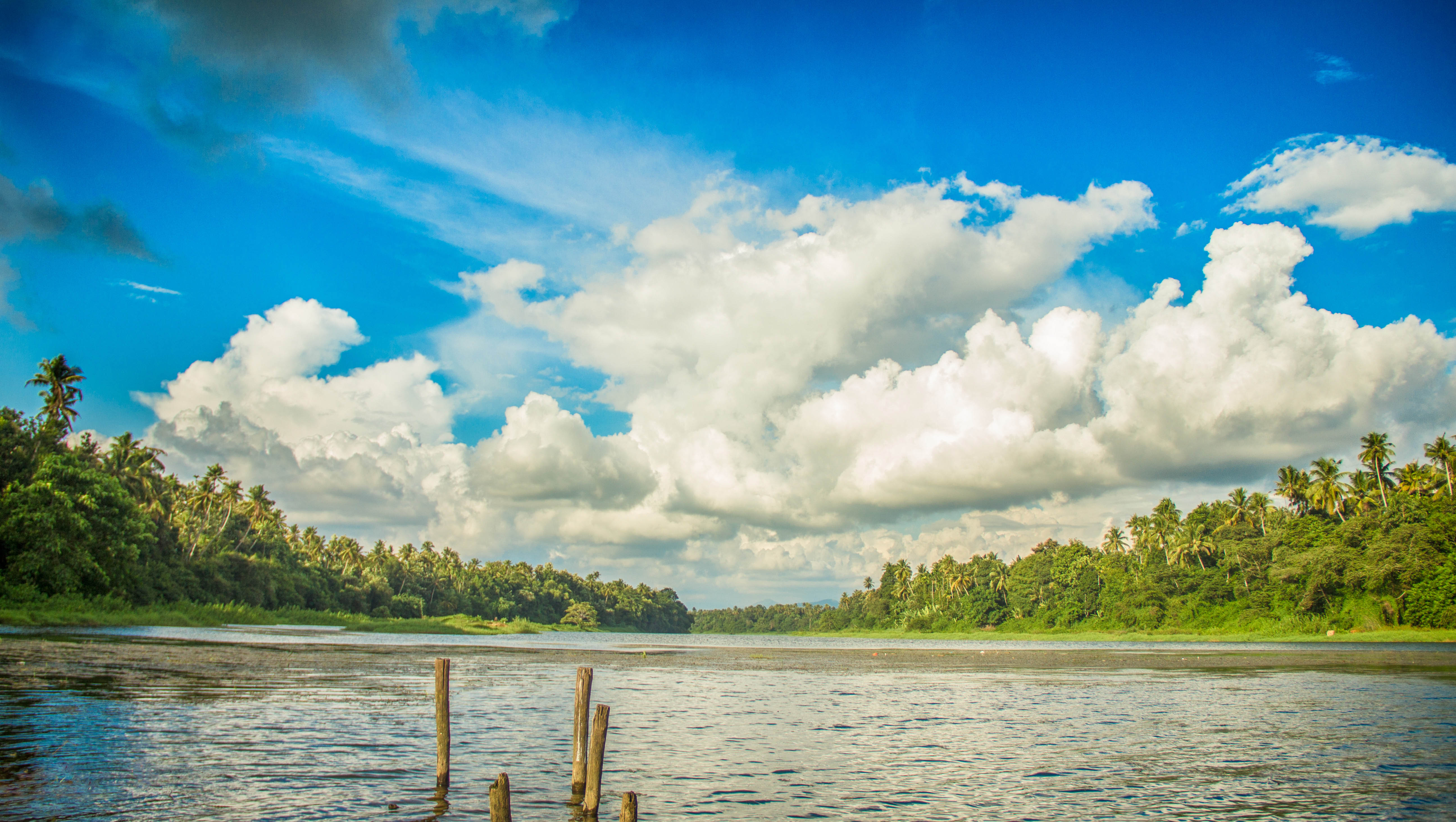
Chalakudy River anticipating the monsoons

The Chalakudy River is known for its diversity, as it contains 98 species of fresh water fish out of the 152 species known from Kerala. Among these, 35 are endemic species of the Western Ghats and 31 are either vulnerable (11 species), endangered (16 species), or critically endangered (4 species) from indiscriminate collection for the aquarium fish trade, overfishing, pollution, dams and introduced species. According to a report of the National Bureau of Fish Genetic Resources in Lucknow, Chalakudy could well be the richest river in fish diversity in India, with thick vegetation on both sides. Among the fish species in the river, the most species rich family are the Cyprinids, followed by Bagrid catfishes and hillstream loaches. Among others, Horabagrus nigricollaris and Sahyadria chalakkudiensis are endemic to the Chalakudy River.

== Waterfalls ==
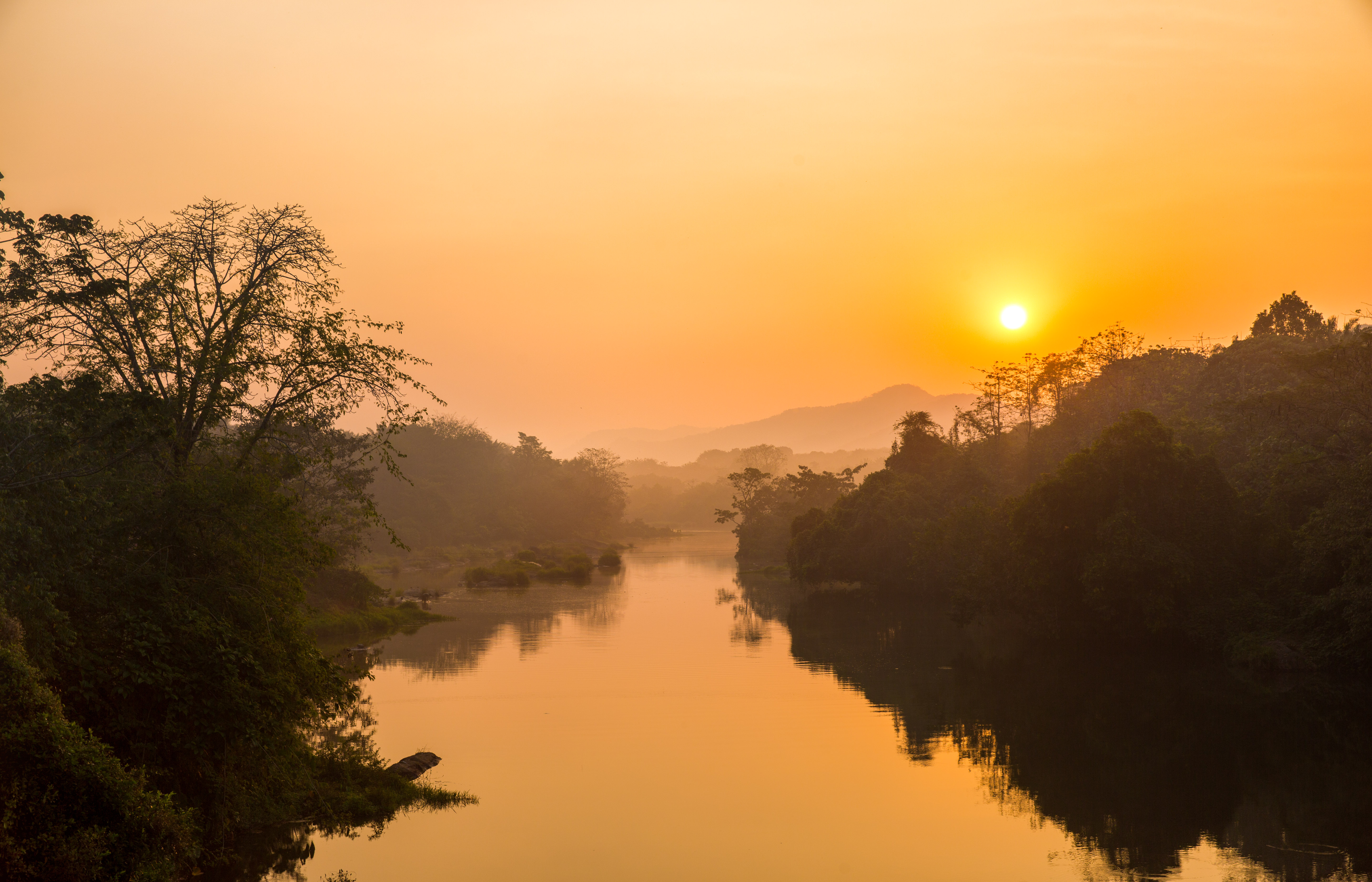
The Sunrise over the Chalakudy River from Vettilapara Bridge

The famous waterfalls, Athirappilly Falls and Vazhachal Falls, are situated on this river. The hydro electric projects on Chalakkudy River are Sholayar Hydro Electric Project and Peringalkuttu Hydro Electric Project. For irrigation purposes Thumboormoozhy Dam is constructed across this river. It merges with the Periyar River near Elenthikara, adjacent to Manjali, North Paravur in Ernakulam District and finally Joins Kodungallur Backwaters and Join Arabian sea at Azhekode. The Parambikulam Dam has been built on the Parambikulam River, one of its four tributaries.

== 2018 Kerala floods ==
Though officially the flood was most severe on 16 August 2018, the banks of the Chalakudy River started flooding from the early hours of 15 August 2018 due to unusually high rainfall during the monsoon season. All the streams, low-lying areas and agricultural fields in the river's proximity was flooded already and the river was correcting the meandering curves created through its centuries of history. All the towns and villages within 5 km of the river were flooded except the slightly high hill tops. It was the worst flood in Chalakudy in nearly a century. The Indian government had declared it a Level 3 Calamity, or "calamity of a severe nature". It is the worst flood in Kerala after the great flood of 99 that took place in 1924.

== Aftermath of the floods ==
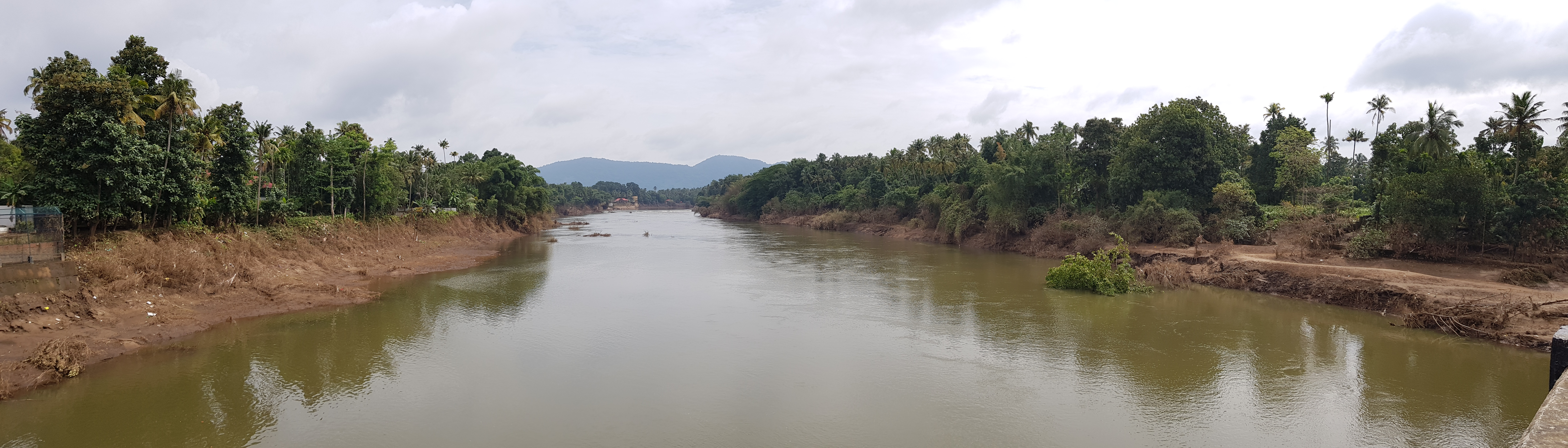
River banks after the flood in 2018

The aftermath of the flood was very severe as it changed the overall outlook of the riverway from the mountains to the river mouth. Large areas of the river banks collapsed and caved in due to the powerful currents in the floods and new banks were created as a result. Huge trees along in the course were uprooted and deposited all along its flow especially on the bridges. Many road bridges even got displaced by a few cm due to the water's force like the Vettilapara Bridge. Also the fauna in the river was greatly affected as the indigenous fish species were displaced from their natural habitats. To make things worse, foreign species were introduced into the river system from the nearby fish farms that had hundreds of varieties of aquarium fishes like the Arapaima, Arowana, Piranha, Alligator Gar, Flowerhorn cichlid, and Red-bellied Pacu. After the floods, an Arapaima of 65 kg, which was grown in a local farm as a tourist attraction, was caught from the Chalakudy river. It is the largest freshwater invasive fish found in Kerala.

== Panorama ==
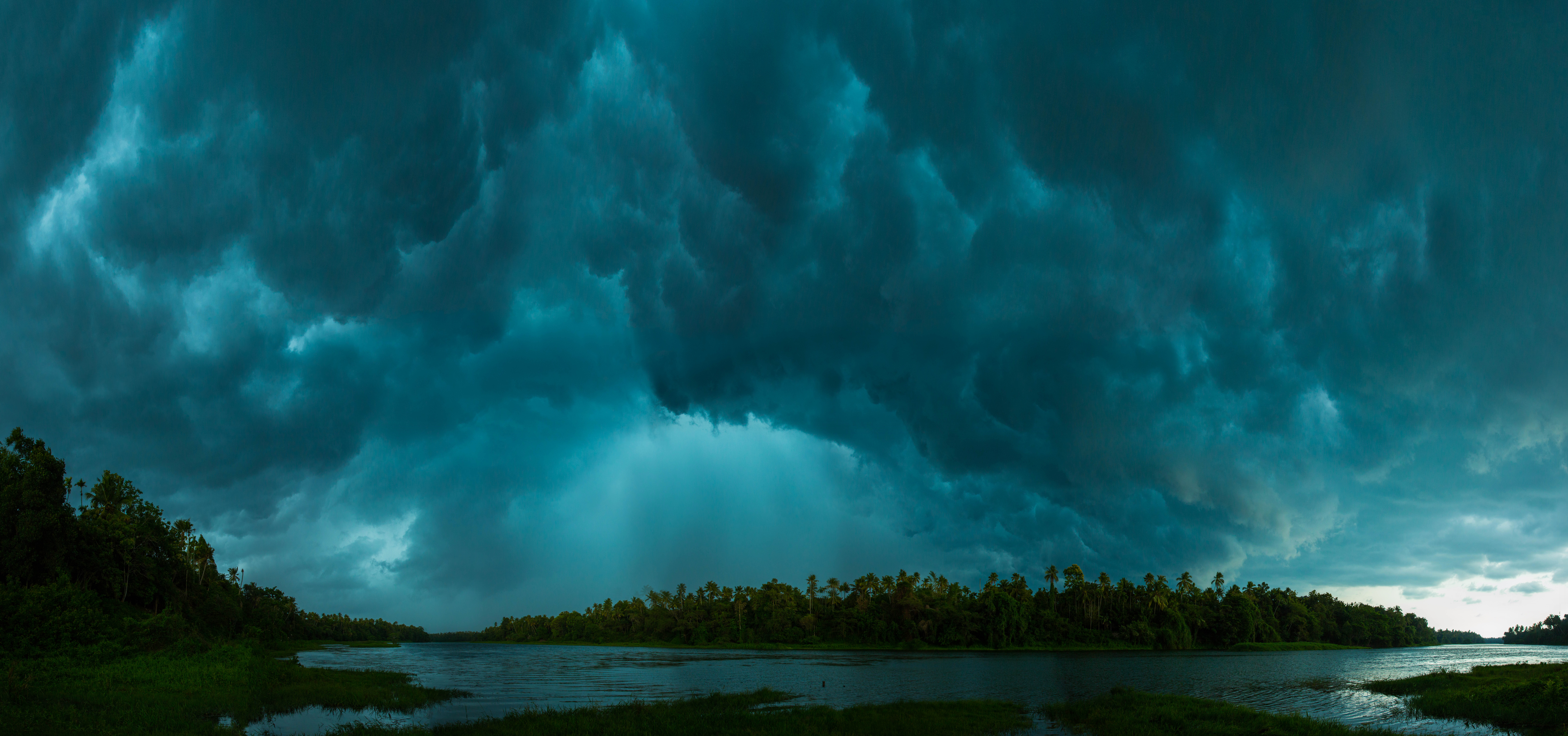
The panoramic view of the monsoon clouds over the Chalakudy River
