= Transportation in Malappuram district =

The Indian district of Malappuram district and metropolitan area of Malappuram district has a well-developed transport infrastructure. The city and its suburbs may be traversed using road and rail. Within the city, city buses, taxis and auto rickshaws provide mobility. Scooters and motorcycles are the favored means of personal transport. Ola, Uber and other taxi services operate there.

Malappuram District

== Road ==
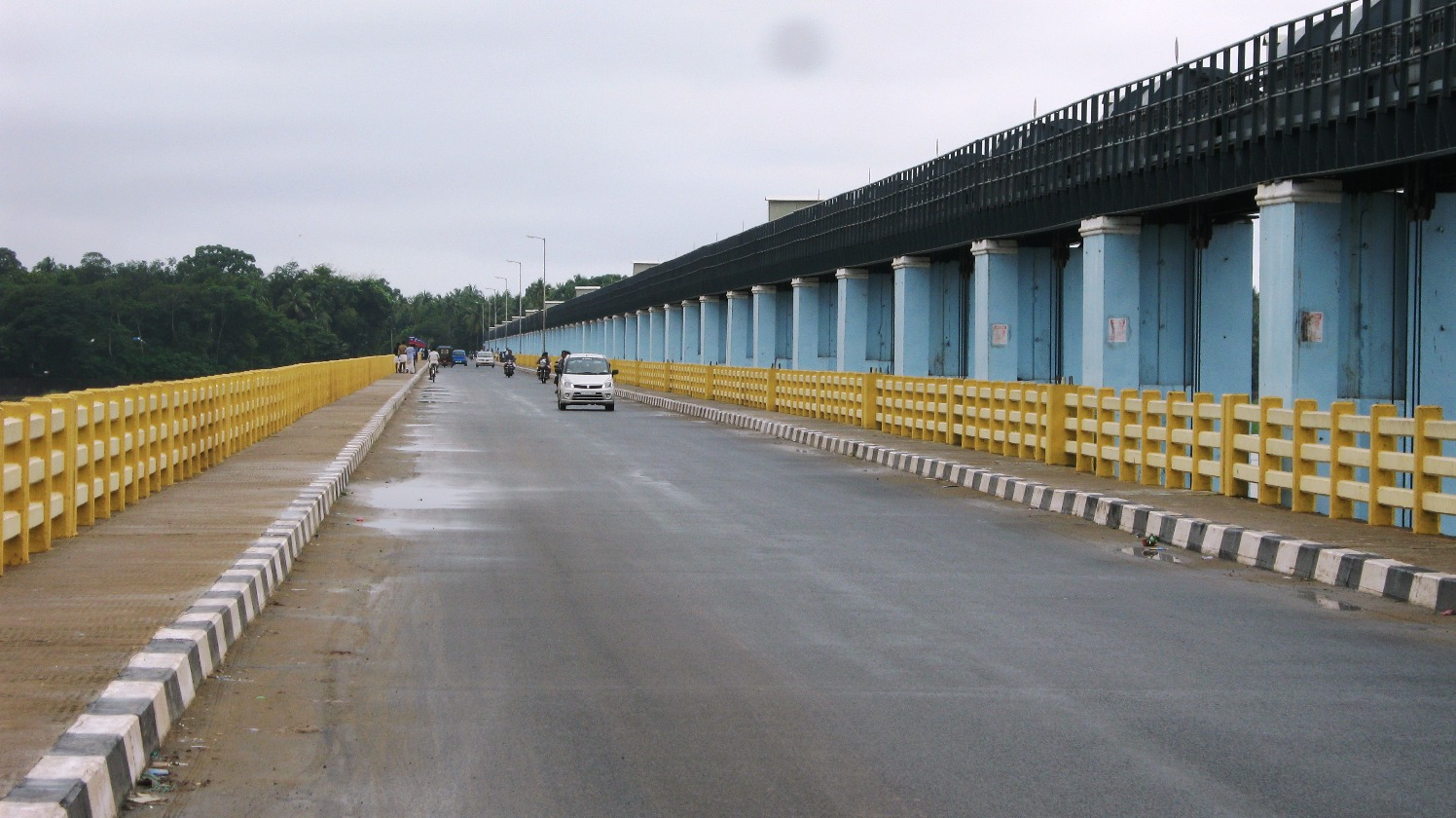
A view from Chamravattom Regulator-cum-Bridge

Malappuram is well connected with all the places in the district as well as the state. KSRTC bus terminal (Govt. buses) is located at Up-Hill on NH 966 (formerly NH 213). Buses are available to different cities of Kerala, Tamil Nadu, Karnataka and Puducherry. Municipal Bus stand for private buses is at Down Hill on Ahmed Kurikkal Road. NH 66 (formerly NH 17) is just 12 km from city center.

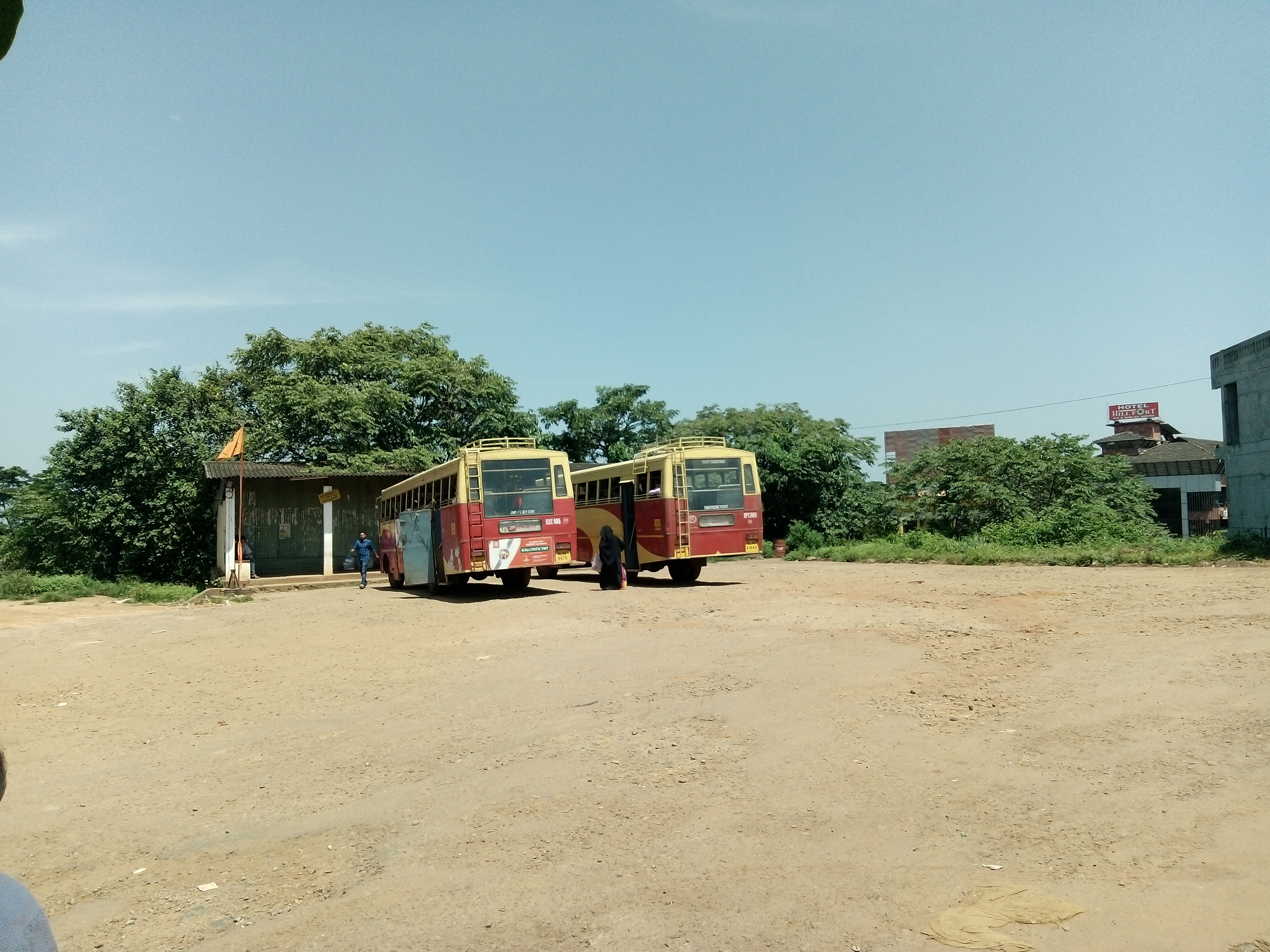
A view of Malappuram KURTC BUS Stand

=== National Highways ===
==== National Highway 66 ====
National Highway 66 is a six-lane highway connecting major cities in Malappuram district. Coming from Kozhikode, NH 66 passes through Idimuzhikkal, Calicut University City (Thenjipalam), Chelari, Kolappuram Airport Junction, Kozhichina via Kottakkal Bypass, Randathani, Puthanathani and again via Puthanathani Bypass to Vettichira, Valanchery Bypass, Kuttippuram, South and Ponnani. The coast of India. This highway connects the city with major cities like Kanyakumari.

==== National Highway 966 ====
National Highway 966 passes through Malappuram district from Ramanattukara, a border town in Kozhikode district. It starts from NH 66 and connects Palakkad. It connects Pulikkal, Karipur Airport Junction, Kondotty, Mongam, Makkaraparamba, Malappuram and Perinthalmanna in Malappuram district. It is 118 kilometres (75 mi) long. It also passes through towns such as Kondotty, Malappuram and Perinthalmanna . It is the road that connects the city and the Karipur International Airport.

== Rail ==

Malappuram City is served by Angadipuram railway station (17 km away). Nearest major railway station is Tirur (Around 26 km from the city), whereas Calicut railway station is 50 km from the city of Malappuram. Other significant stations in the district include Kuttippuram, Nilambur Road, Parappanangadi and small stations include Vallikkunnu, Tanur, Pallippuram, Perassannur, Tirunnavaya, Kulukkallur, Cherukara, Pattikkad, Melattur, Thuvvur, Thodiyappulam, Vaniyambalam. However Ministry of railways have included the railway line connecting Kozhikkode-Malappuram-Angadipuram in its Vision 2020 as socially desirable railway line. Multiple surveys have been done on the line already.

== Air ==
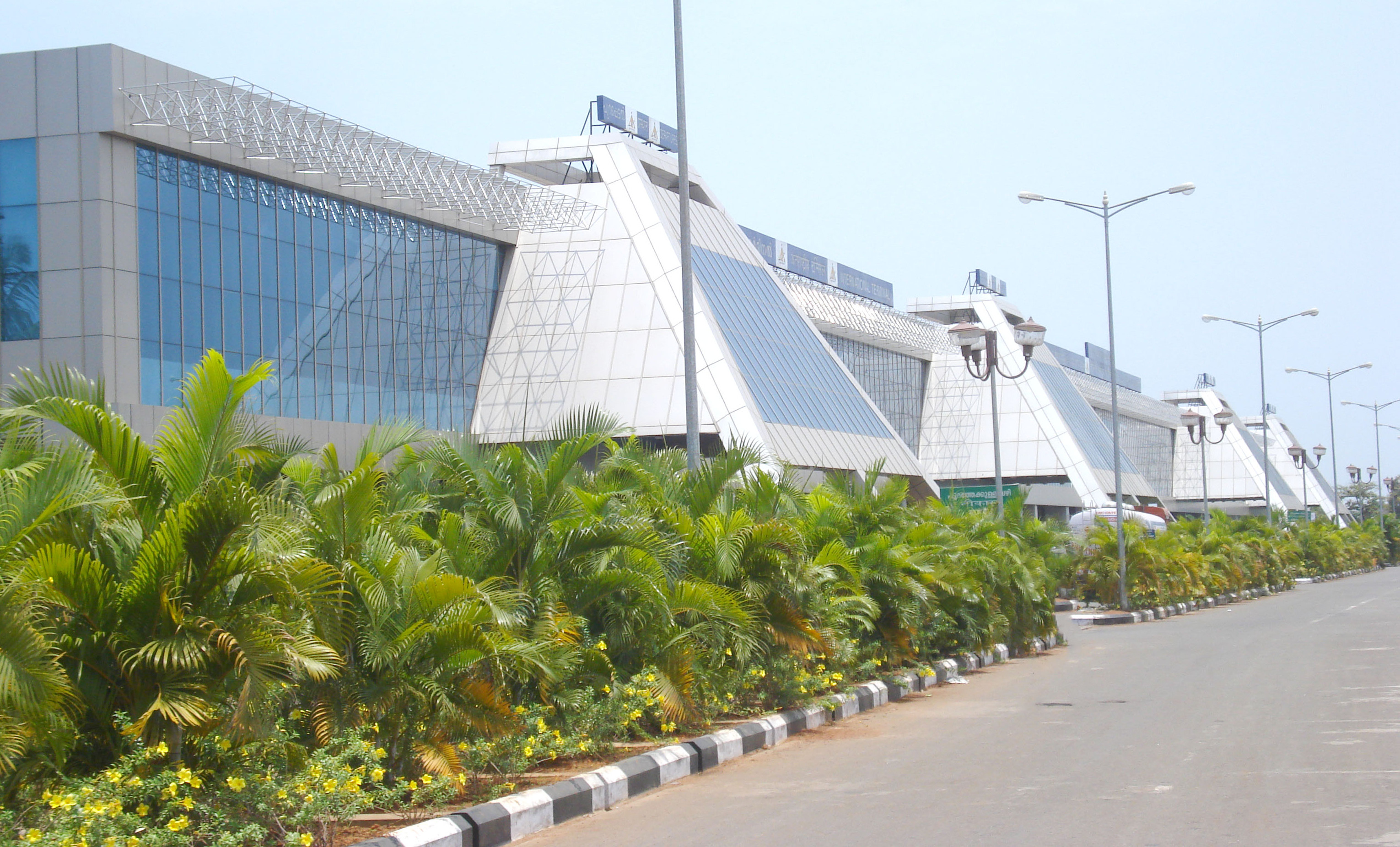
A view of Airport Terminal

Karipur Airport which is located in the periphery of the city is just 25 km away. It is the seventh busiest airport in the country in terms of international passenger traffic. Domestic flight services are available to major cities like Bangalore, Chennai, Mumbai, Hyderabad, Goa, Cochin, Trivandrum, Mangalore and Coimbatore while International flight services connects Malappuram with Dubai, Jeddah, Riyadh, Sharjah, Abu Dhabi, Al Ain, Bahrain, Dammam, Doha, Muscat, Salalah, Kuwait and Malaysia.

== Waterways ==
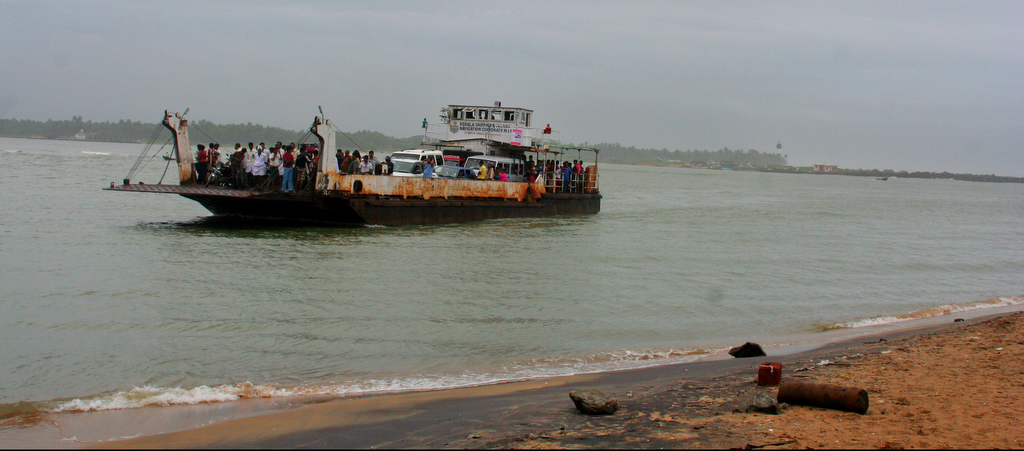
A view Tirur to Ponnani ferry service

Malappuram district is located in a coastal region, with the Arabian Sea as one of its borders. Water transport is important in the district through rivers and backwaters. The main boat services are in the Ponnani area of Malappuram district and other areas with small ferry services. One of the ports on the western coast of the state is located in Ponnani. It is where the Ponnani Port is located. Ferry services are operated from Tirur to Ponnani.

== Mass transit ==
Malappuram Metro Rail is a proposed mass transit system for the city by Lensfed (Licensed Engineers & Supervisors Federation). The proposal was considering the future urban scenario which would demand a transport system that can cater to the million plus population of the Malappuram urban agglomeration. In April 2012, Lensfed submitted detailed project report to Government which proposed 8 major stations and 9 intermediate stations out of which three elevated stations at Malappuram Central, Kondotty and Angadipuram. The alignment is similar to the proposed railway line of Calicut-Malappuram-Angadipuram. Apart from this, there is a proposal to extend proposed Kozhikode Light Metro Rail network to Malappuram during its third phase of expansion, paving a way to Calicut-Malappuram 'Urban Corridor' concept.

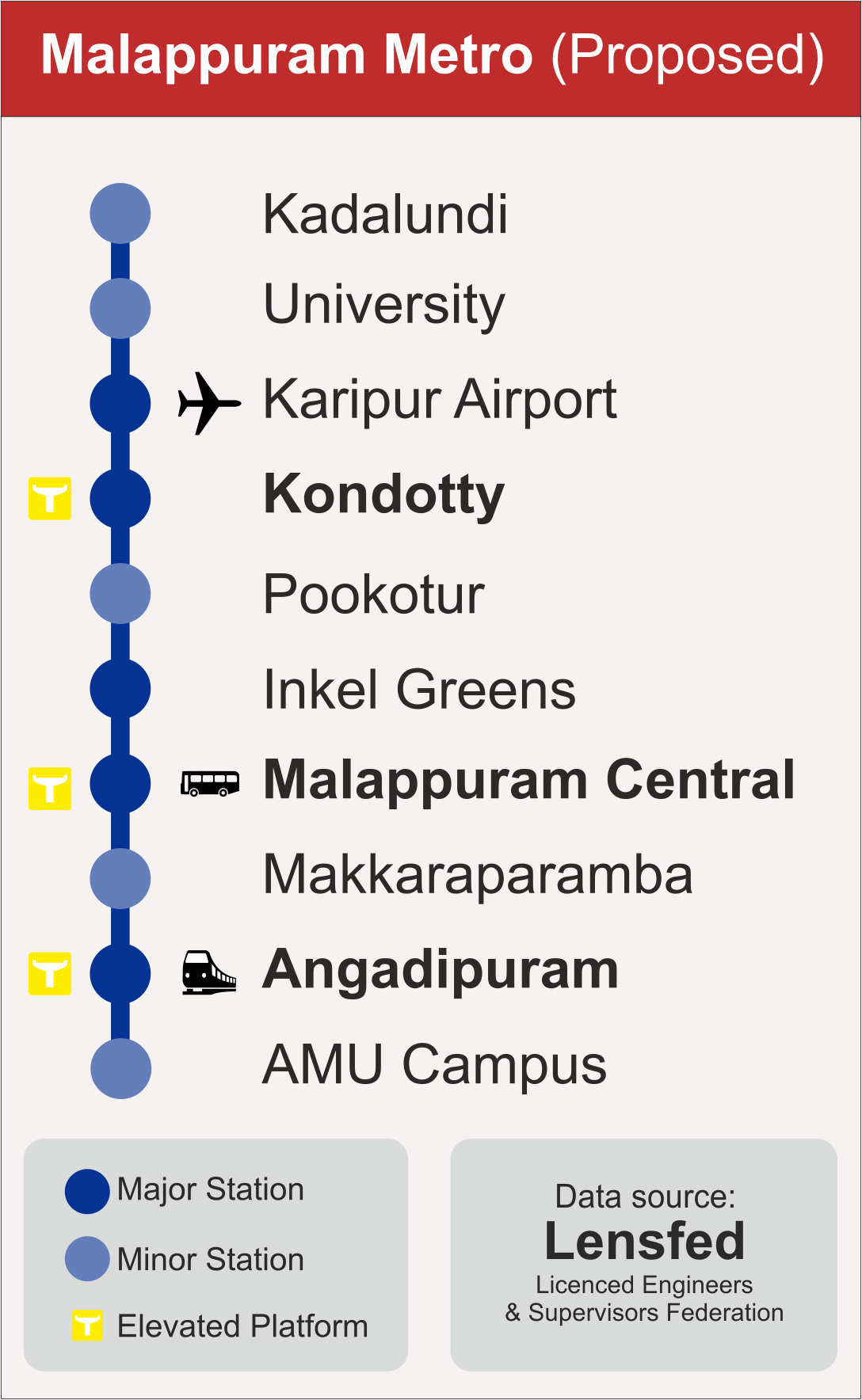
Proposed Malappuram Metro Rail route.

== Road distance ==
Distance from major places to Malappuram in kilometers.

| City/Town | Distance (km) | City/Town | Distance (km) | City/Town | Distance (km) | City/Town | Distance (km) | City/Town | Distance (km) |
|---|---|---|---|---|---|---|---|---|---|
| Cochin | 161 | Kollam | 295 | Guruvayur | 75 | Kottayam | 224 | Calicut | 50 |
| Nedumbassery Airport(Cochin) | 147 | Palghat | 89 | Thrissur | 92 | Trivandrum (State Capital) | 360 | Ooty | 140 |
| Bangalore | 355 | Coimbatore | 138 | Kanyakumari | 458 | Kodaikanal | 239 | Alleppey | 218 |
| Mangalore | 254 | Mysore | 203 | Chennai | 627 | Salem | 301 | Cannanore | 141 |

== See also ==
- Administration of Malappuram
- Education in Malappuram
- History of Malappuram
- List of desoms in Malappuram (1981)
- List of Gram Panchayats in Malappuram
- List of people from Malappuram
- List of villages in Malappuram
- Malappuram metropolitan area
- Malappuram district
- South Malabar
