= Pattikkad =

Pattikkad may refer to several places:

- Pattikkad, Thrissur, a small village in Thrissur district, Kerala, India
- Pattikkad, Malappuram, a small village in Malappuram district, Kerala, India
- Pattikkad railway station, a railway station in Malappuram district, Kerala, India
