= Thiruvananthapuram North–Nilambur Road Rajya Rani Express =

Train in India

Rajya Rani Express
Overview
- Service type: Rajya Rani Express
- First service: 11 November 2011; 14 years ago
- Current operator: Southern Railways

Route
- Termini: Thiruvananthapuram North (TVCN); Nilambur Road (NIL)
- Stops: 21
- Distance travelled: 385 km (239 mi)
- Average journey time: 8 hrs 45 mins
- Service frequency: Daily
- Train number: 16349 / 16350

On-board services
- Classes: General Unreserved, AC 2 Tier, AC 3 Tier, Sleeper class
- Seating arrangements: Yes
- Sleeping arrangements: Yes
- Catering facilities: On-board catering E-catering
- Other facilities: Below the seats

Technical
- Rolling stock: ICF coach
- Track gauge: 1,676 mm (5 ft 6 in)
- Operating speed: 42 km/h (26 mph) average including halts
Route map
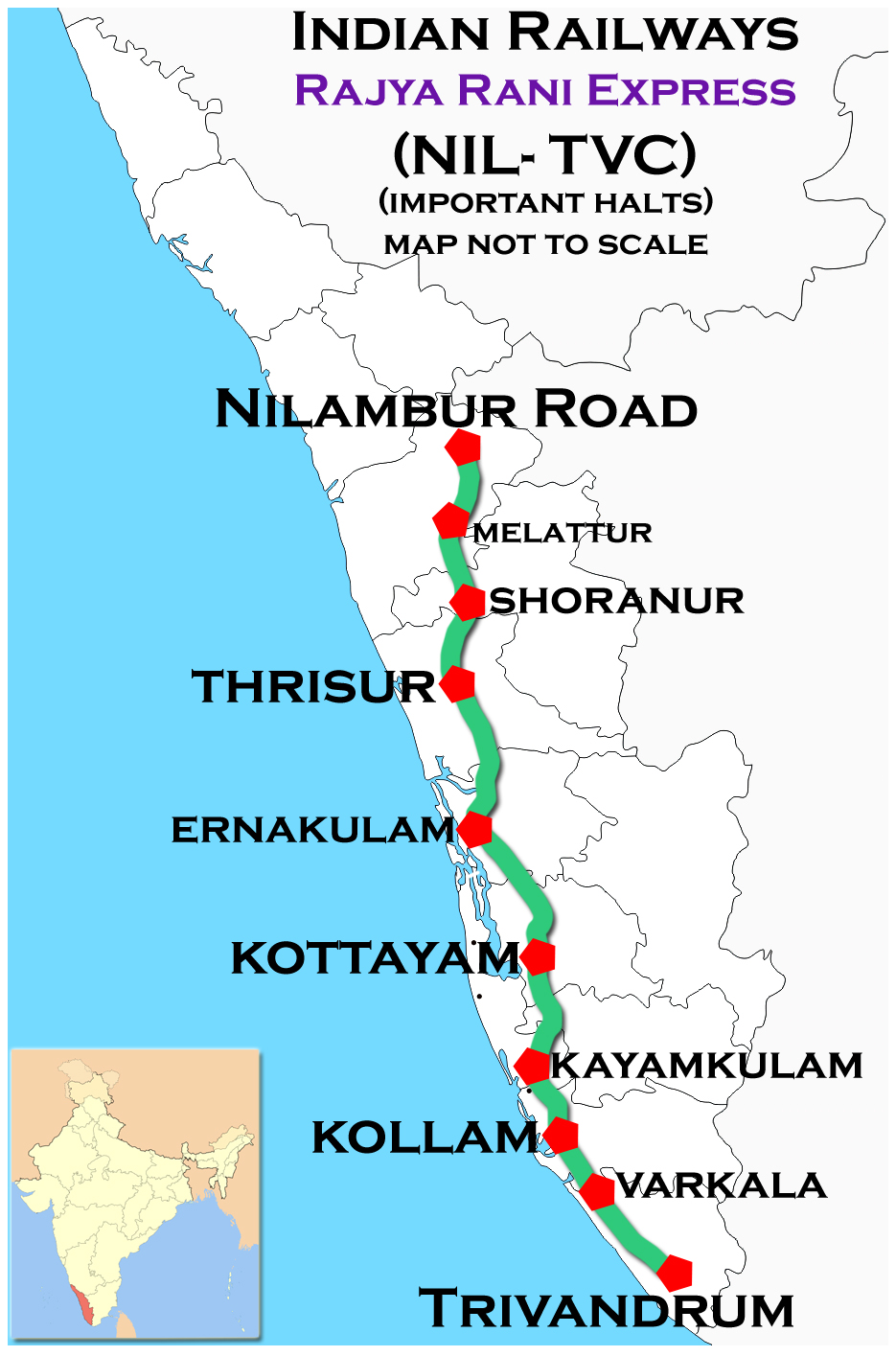

The 16349 / 16350 Rajya Rani Express is an Express train belonging to Indian Railways Southern Railway zone that runs between Thiruvananthapuram North and Nilambur Road in India. This train is a part of Rajya Rani Express series of trains and serves the state of Kerala.

It operates as train number 16349 from Thiruvananthapuram North to Nilambur Road and as train number 16350 in the reverse direction.

== Background ==
This train was inaugurated on 11 November 2011, initially originating from Thiruvananthapuram Central to reach its destination. The train starts at 9 pm from Thiruvananthapuram and reaches Nilambur at 6.05 am. This train is then halted there until the return service at 9.30 pm. After inauguration, there were demands from commuters to make Rajya Rani Express an independent train. In consideration of these demands, this train was made an independent train. Due to the traffic pressure on Thiruvananthapuram Central, the originating source was also shifted to Thiruvananthapuram North from 30 January 2019. In 2025, the railways mooted a proposal to make the train a day train by having it spend less time at Nilambur.

== Coaches ==
The 16349 / 50 Rajya Rani Express has a total of 13 coaches which includes one AC 2 Tier, one AC 3 Tier, eight Sleeper class, two general unreserved & two SLR (seating with luggage rake) coaches. It does not carry a pantry car.

As it is customary with most train services in India, coach composition may be amended at the discretion of Indian Railways depending on demand.The railways planned to increase the number of unreserved coaches of the train.

== Routing ==
The train runs to/from Kochuveli via Kollam Junction, Kayamkulam Junction, Chengannur, Tiruvalla, Kottayam, Ernakulam Town, Aluva, Thrissur, Shoranur Junction, Angadipuram, Vaniyambalam to/from Nilambur Road.

== Traction ==
The train is hauled by an Erode or Arakkonam-based WAP-4 electric locomotive and WDM-3D diesel locomotive between Thiruvananthapuram North and Nilambur road
