= Nilambur–Shoranur line =

Railway line in India

Nilambur-Shoranur line
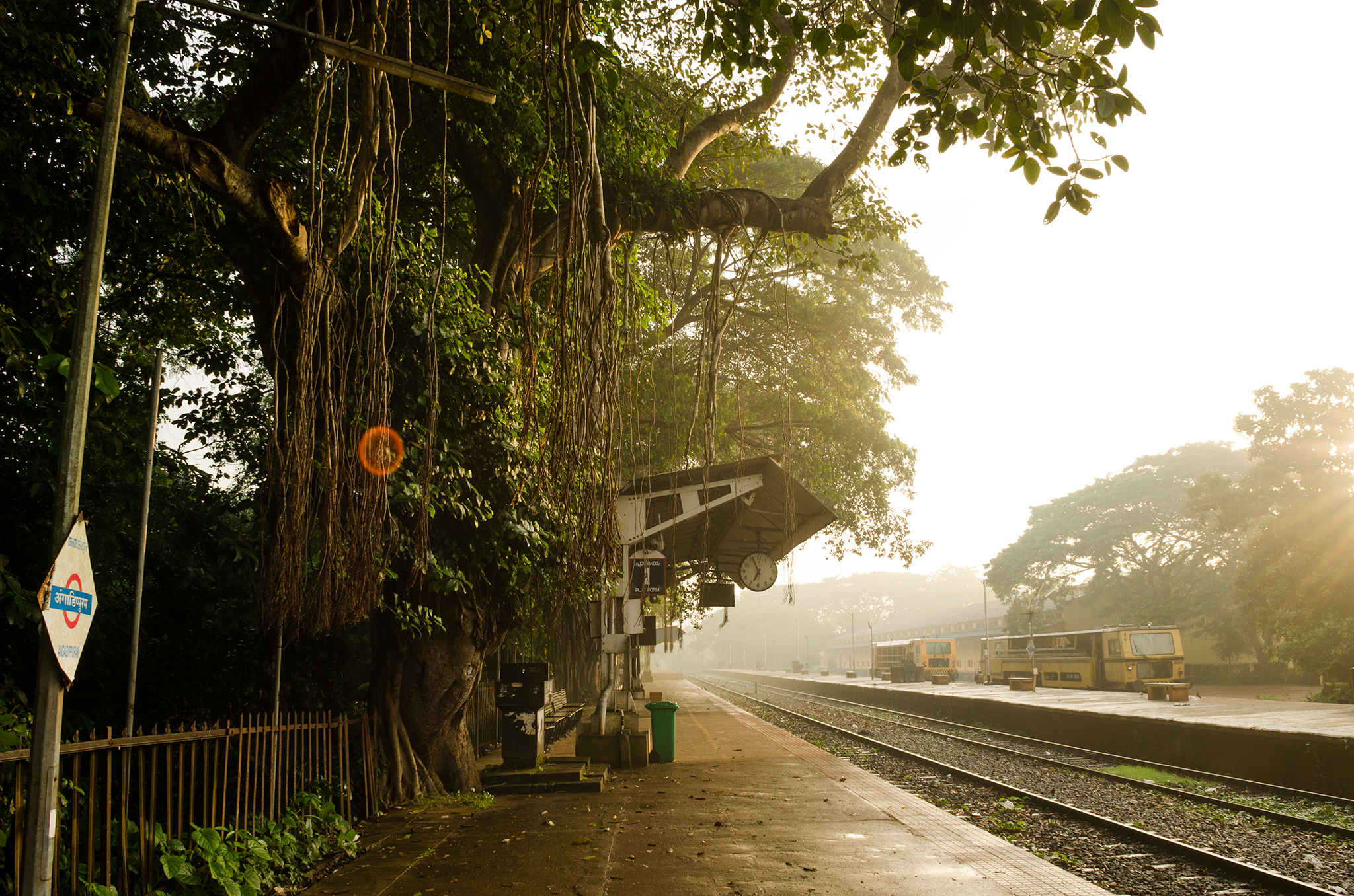
- Nilambur–Shoranur line passes through Angadipuram railway station

Overview
- Status: Operational
- Owner: Indian Railways
- Locale: Malappuram, Palakkad
- Coordinates: 11.2824°N 76.2511°E
- Termini: Nilambur Road (NIL); Shoranur Junction (SRR)
- Stations: 11

Service
- Type: Express train Passenger train
- System: Southern Railway
- Services: 7
- Operator: Southern Railway zone
- Rolling stock: Wap 4, Wap 7, Wag 9, Wap 1, Wag 7, Wag 5 Locomotives

History
- Opened: 1927; 99 years ago

Technical
- Line length: 66 km (41 mi)
- Number of tracks: 1
- Character: single-line
- Track gauge: 1,676 mm (5 ft 6 in)
- Electrification: Yes
- Operating speed: 85 km/h (53 mph)

The Nilambur–Shoranur line is a 66 kilometres (41 mi)-long single-line, electrified broad-gauge (1676 mm) railway spur branch line of the Indian Railways connecting Nilambur Road railway station in Malappuram district with Shoranur Junction in Palakkad district in the state of Kerala. It is a branch line administered by the Palakkad railway division of the Southern Railway zone and one of the shortest broad-gauge railway lines in India. It was laid by the British in the colonial era for the transportation of Nilambur Teak logs to the United Kingdom through Kozhikode. The line is electrified and was inspected by railway officials from Southern Railway on 30 March 2024. With this, the Palakkad division achieved 100% electrification.

== History ==
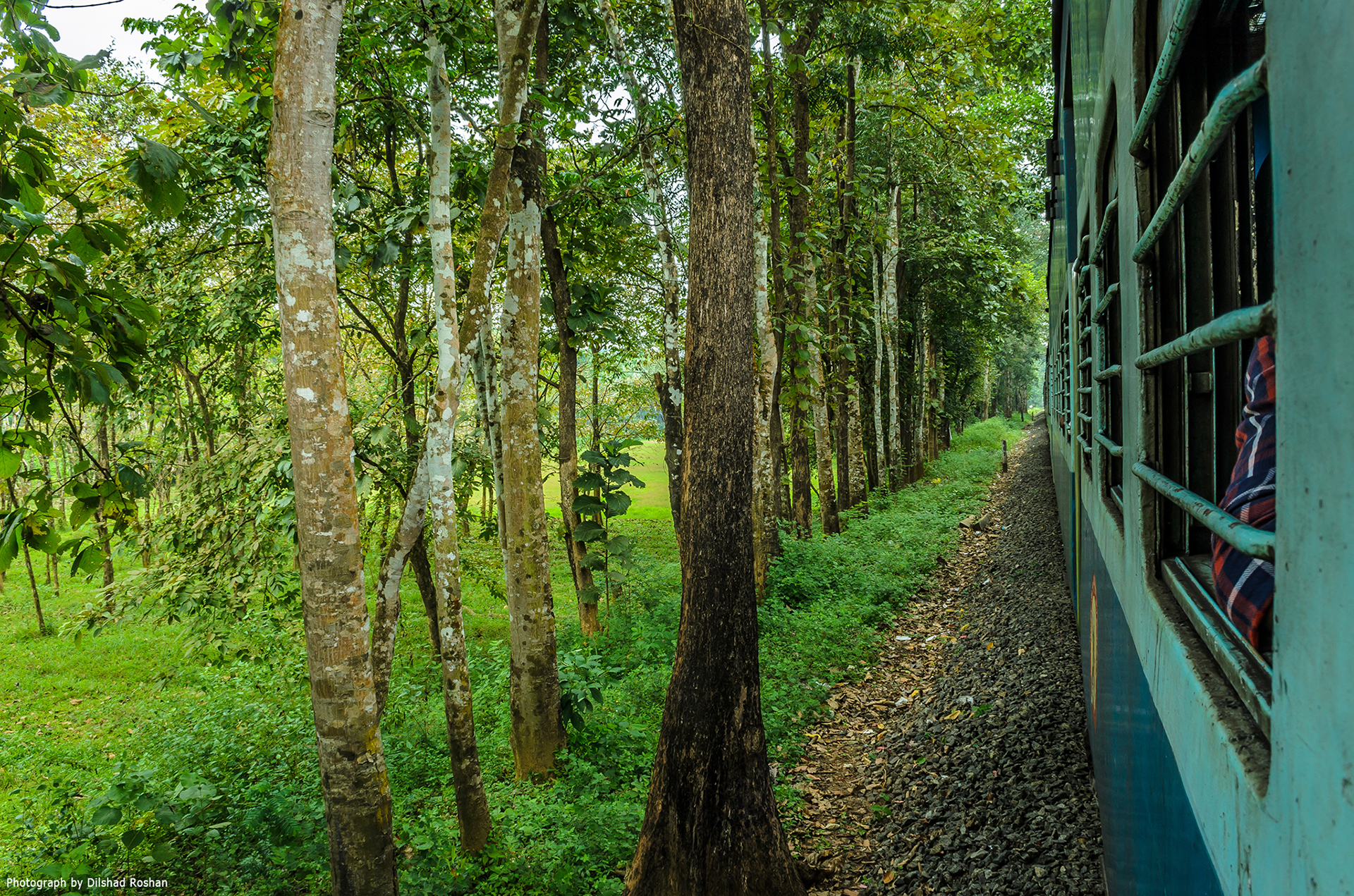
Nilambur-Shoranur line passes through woods

In 1840, the British created a teak plantation in Nilambur to ensure a steady supply of timber for their various needs. In 1923, the South Indian Railway Company, which operated the Madras–Shoranur–Mangalore line, was contracted by the Madras Presidency to build a railway from Nilambur to Shoranur to ensure easy transportation of timber from these forests to the plains and hence to ports and onward transportation. The company completed the line in stages. The Shoranur–Angadippuram section was opened on 3 February 1927, Angadippuram–Vaniyambalam on 3 August 1927 and the entire stretch from Shoranur to Nilambur was opened on 26 October 1927. During World War II, the Shoranur line, along with other numerous railway lines across British India were dismantled and rolling stock diverted to the Middle East to help British war efforts. The line ceased to exist in 1941. After independence, following public pressure, the railway line was reconstructed by the Indian Railways along its original alignment. The Shornur -Angadipuram line re-opened in 1953 and Angadipuram–Nilambur in 1954. The teak plantation still stands today as a major tourist attraction.

== Geography ==
The Shoranur–Nilambur line starts from Shoranur Junction and terminates at Nilambur Road railway station, located at a distance of four kilometers from Nilambur town on the Kozhikode–Ooty highway, 40 kilometres (25 mi) from the district headquarters of Malappuram town. The line passes through the eastern part of the Malappuram district. It crosses Kunthippuzha between Kulukkalloor and Cherukara which borders Palakkad and Malappuram districts. Velliyar river, a major tributary of Kadalundi river (between Pattikkad and Melattur), Olippuzha river, another tributary of Kadalundi river (between Melattur and Tuvvur) and Kuthirappuzha, a tributary of Chaliyar river (between Vaniyambalam and Nilambur road) are other major rivers that this line crosses.

No.	Station name	Station code	Distance (km)	Coordinates
1	Shoranur Junction	SRR	0	10.759524°N 76.272237°E
2	Vadanamkurishshi	VDKS	4.3	10.787665°N 76.252691°E
3	Vallapuzha	VPZ	10.4	10.840400°N 76.252420°E
4	Kulukkallur	KZC	14.0	10.868184°N 76.238656°E
5	Cherukara	CQA	20.6	10.93169°N 76.226357°E
6	Angadipuram	AAM	27.7	10.981228°N 76.207931°E
7	Pattikkad	PKQ	33.3	11.021027°N 76.232082°E
8	Melattur	MLTR	40.5	11.061734°N 76.271203°E
9	Tuvvur	TUV	46.9	11.120533°N 76.283178°E
10	Thodiyappulam	TDPM	51.2	11.153261°N 76.283178°E
11	Vaniyambalam	VNB	55.5	11.187487°N 76.268599°E
12	Nilambur Road	NIL	66.1	11.282541°N 76.251147°E

Railway stations on the Shoranur–Nilambur Road line are supported by small buildings and the platforms are low and short, located among thick vegetation that reaches close to the track throughout the stretch. Teak and banyan trees are common, with overhanging roots of banyan trees present on many station platforms, with the tree canopy completely covering many stations. The Nilambur Road railway station itself offers a views against the backdrop of the Western Ghats.

== Operations ==
Services on the Shoranur–Nilambur Road line consist of five pairs of passenger trains and two express trains, all running daily. Four of the passenger trains run between Shoranur and Nilambur, while one pair runs to Nilambur from Palakkad. Two express trains, the 16349/16350 Kochuveli–Nilambur Road Rajya Rani Express and the 16325/16326 Nilambur-Kottayam Express are currently running. Locomotives used on the line are the WDM-3A, WDM-3D, WDG-3A and WDP-4D from the Diesel Loco Shed, Ernakulam; Diesel Loco Shed, Erode and Diesel Loco Shed, Golden Rock.

As Melattur Traction substation is commissioned and electrification works are over, from 1 January 2025, electric locomotives replaced the diesel locomotives.

Train list (Nilambur Road-Shornur Route)

No.	Train No.	Name	From	To	Daily
1.	66325	NIL SRR MEMU	NIL	SRR	Yes
2.	56612	NIL SRR Passenger	NIL	SRR	Yes
3.	56322	NIL SRR Passenger	NIL	SRR	Yes
4.	56610	NIL SRR Passenger	NIL	SRR	Yes
5.	16325	KTYM Express	NIL	KTYM	Yes
6.	56608	NIL PGT Passenger	NIL	PGT	Yes
7.	56614	NIL SRR Passenger	NIL	SRR	Yes
8.	16350	TVCN Rajya Rani Express	NIL	TVCN	Yes

Train list (Shornur- Nilambur Road Route)

No.	Train No.	Name	From	To	Daily
1.	16349	NIL Rajya Rani Express	TVCN	NIL	Yes
2.	56607	PGT NIL Passenger	PGT	NIL	Yes
3.	56323	SRR NIL Passenger	SRR	NIL	Yes
4.	16326	NIL Express	KTYM	NIL	Yes
5.	56609	SRR NIL Passenger	SRR	NIL	Yes
6.	56611	SRR NIL Passenger	SRR	NIL	Yes
7.	56613	SRR NIL Passenger	SRR	NIL	Yes
8.	66326	SRR NIL MEMU	SRR	NIL	Yes

== See also ==
- Edakkara town
- Angadippuram town
