= Tuvvur railway station =

Railway station in Kerala, India

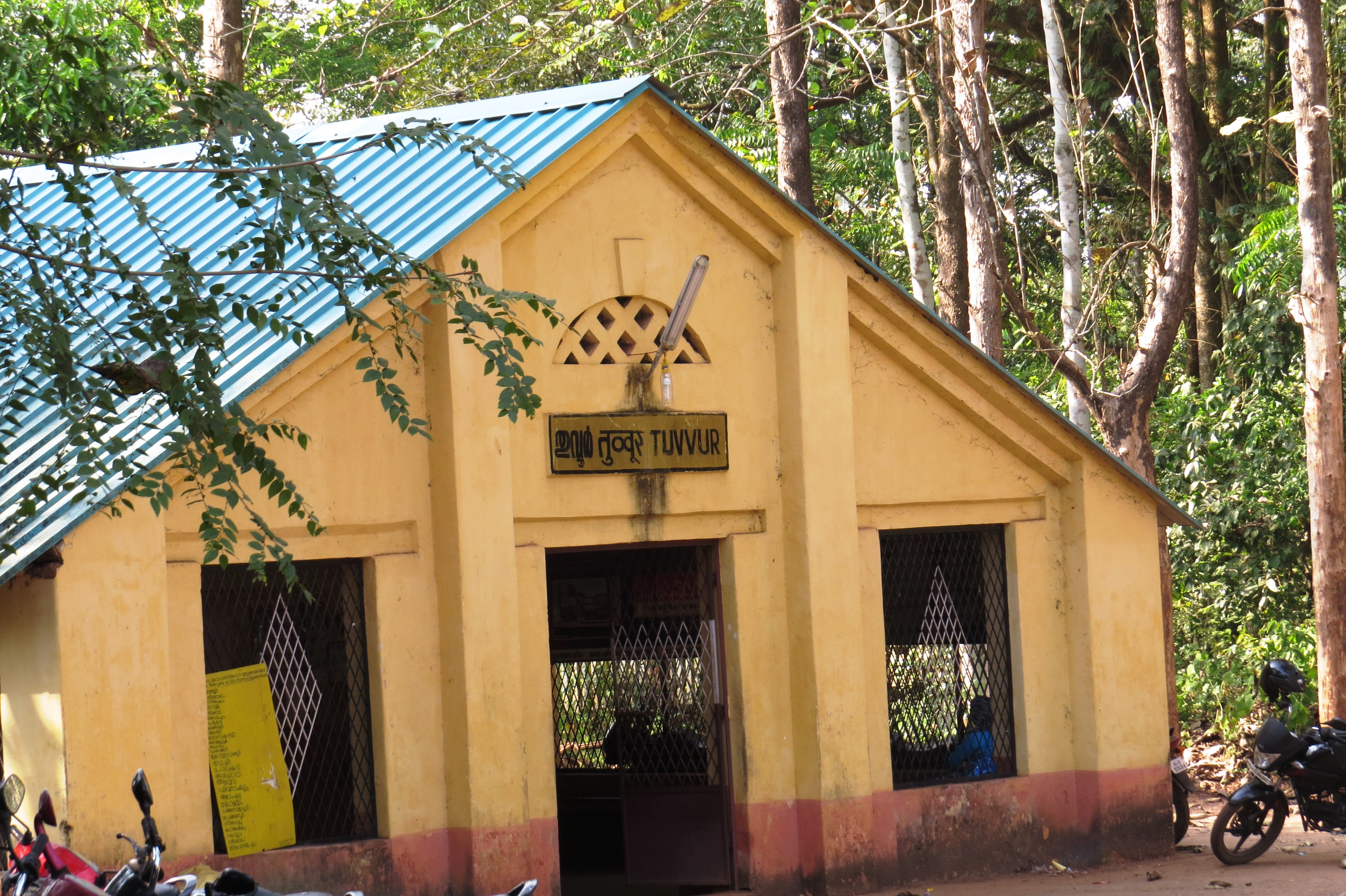

General information
- Location: Malappuram, Palakkad; India
- Coordinates: 10.981228°N 76.207931°E
- Owner: Indian Railways
- Line: Nilambur–Shoranur line
- Platforms: 1
- Tracks: 1

Other information
- Status: Active
- Station code: TUV

History
- Opened: 1921; 105 years ago

Services
Preceding station	Indian Railways	Following station
Melattur towards Shoranur Junction	Southern Railway zone Shoranur–Nilambur section	Thodiyappulam towards Nilambur Road
Route map
Location

Tuvvur railway station is a minor railway station serving the town of Tuvvur in the Malappuram district of Kerala in India. It lies in the Shoranur–Nilambur section of the Southern Railways. Trains halting at the station connect the town to prominent cities in India such as Nilambur, Shoranur and Angadipuram.
