= Melattur railway station =

Railway station in Kerala, India

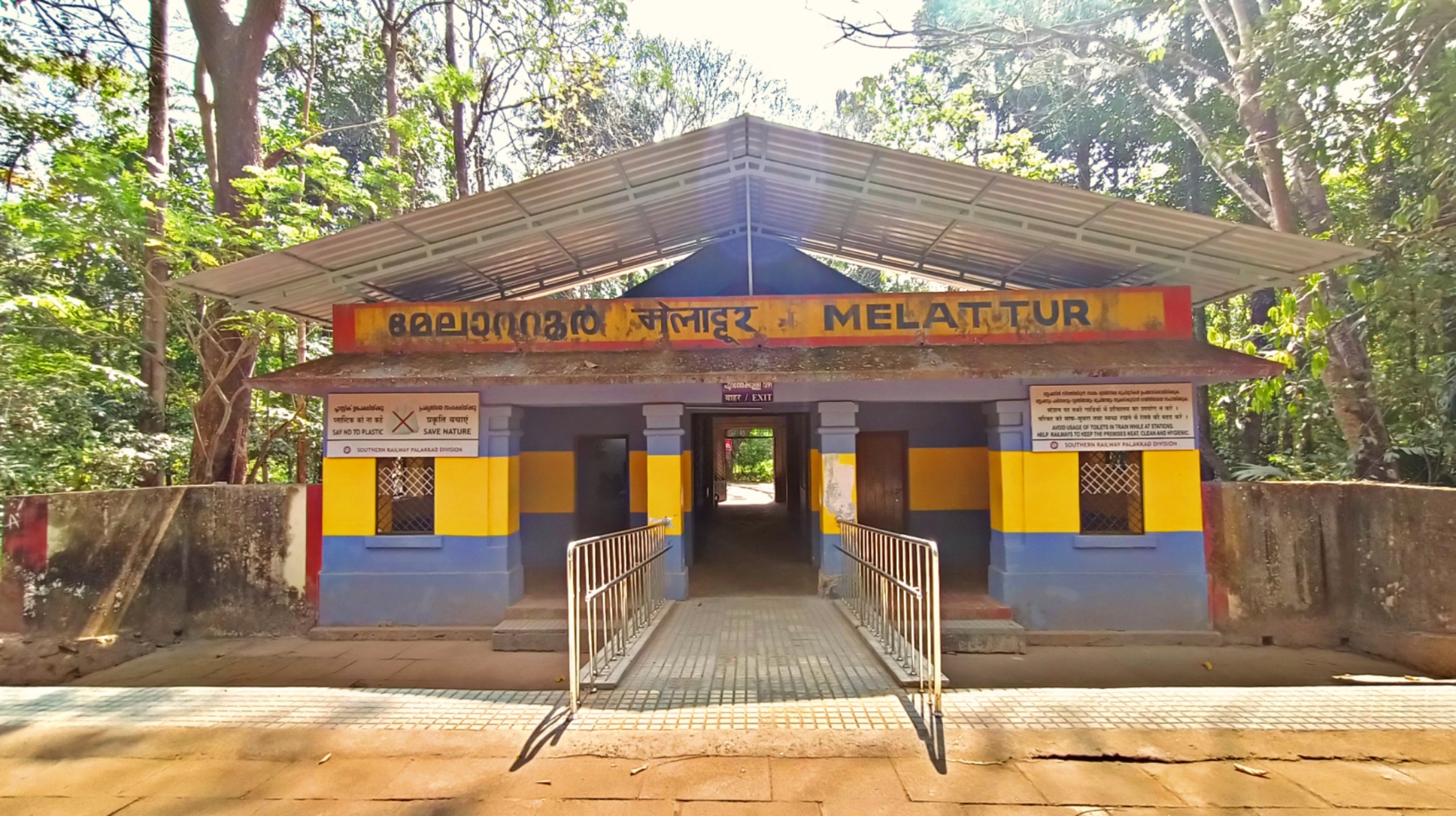
- Melattur Railway Station

General information
- Location: Melattur; India
- Coordinates: 10.981228°N 76.207931°E
- Owner: Indian Railways
- Line: Nilambur–Shoranur line
- Platforms: 1
- Tracks: 1 (Operational) 2nd track (work progressing)

Other information
- Status: Active
- Station code: MLTR
- Fare zone: Southern Railway zone

History
- Opened: 1921; 105 years ago

Services
Preceding station	Indian Railways	Following station
Pattikkad towards Shoranur Junction	Southern Railway zone Shoranur–Nilambur section	Tuvvur towards Nilambur Road
Route map
Location

Melattur railway station is a minor railway station serving the town of Melattur in the Malappuram district of Kerala, India. It lies on the scenic Nilambur–Shoranur line of the Palakkad Division of Southern Railways. Trains halting at the station connect the town to prominent cities in Kerala such as Nilambur, Shoranur, Palakkad, Ernakulam and Thiruvananthapuram.

Melattur railway station was a scenic railway station with antique station building, lot of trees aside of platforms, withered may flowers painting the platforms. However after the construction of Melattur Traction substation and electrification works along the route, most the charm has been lost.

Construction works are in progress for the second platform so as to upgrade Melattur railway station as a crossing station.
