= Cherukara railway station =

Railway station in India

Cherukara railway station ചെറുകര റെയിൽവേ സ്റ്റേഷൻ
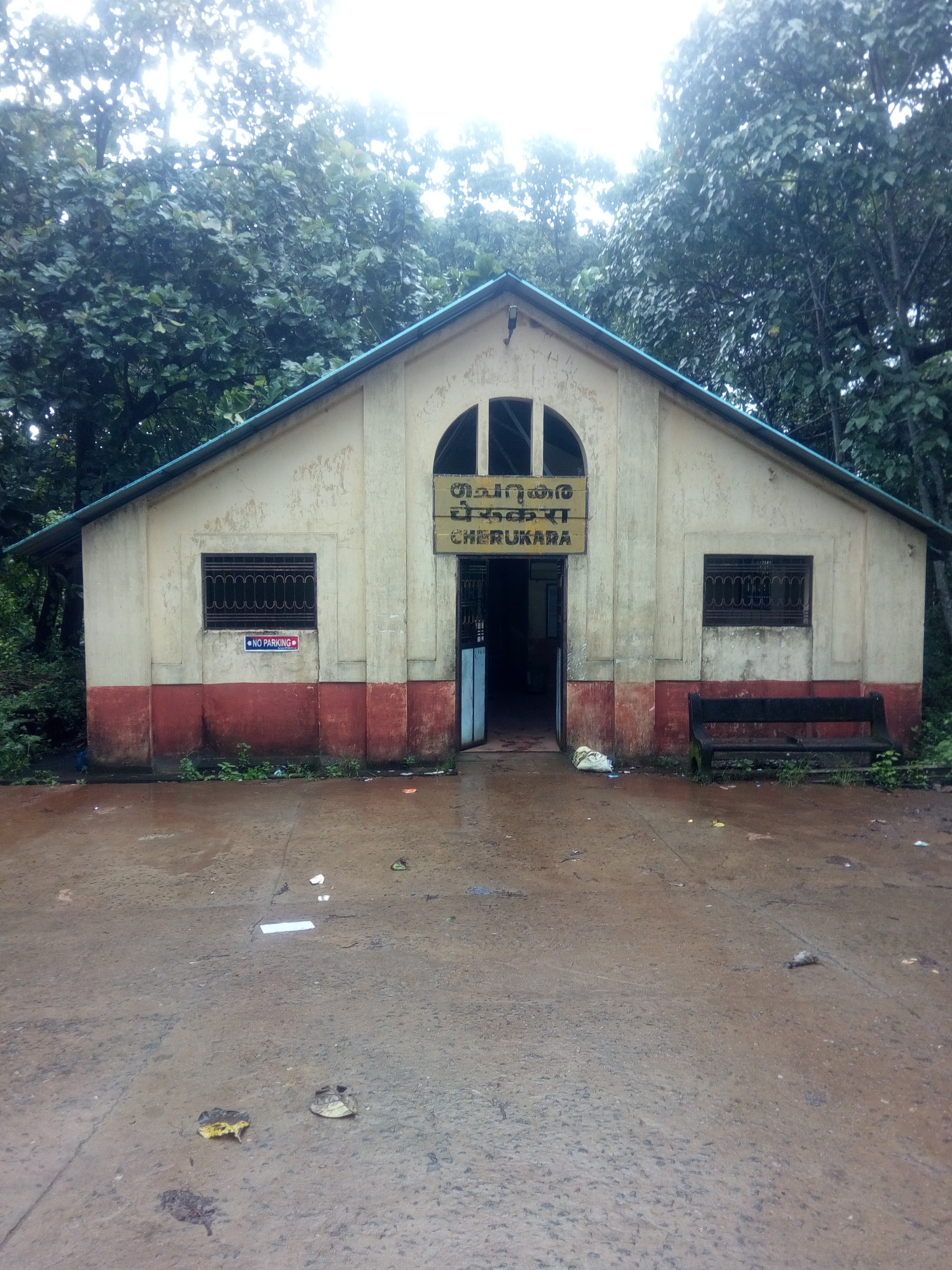
- Cherukara railway station

General information
- Coordinates: 10.926451°N 76.2275044°E
- Operator: Southern Railway
- Line: Nilambur–Shoranur line
- Platforms: 1
- Tracks: 1

Other information
- Status: Functioning
- Station code: CQA
- Fare zone: Southern Railway

Services
Preceding station	Indian Railways	Following station
Kulukkallur towards Shoranur Junction	Southern Railway zone Shoranur–Nilambur section	Angadipuram towards Nilambur Road
Route map
Location
- Location within India Location within Kerala

Cherukara railway station is a minor railway station in Southern Railways, serving the town of Cherukara in the Malappuram district of Kerala, India.

It lies in the Shoranur–Nilambur section of the Southern Railways. The station code is CQA. Trains halting at the station connect the town to several cities in India such as Nilambur, Shoranur and Angadipuram.

== Nilambur–Shoranur line ==
This station is on a historic branch line, one of the shortest broad-gauge railway lines in India. This entire station route is known for its scenery and is surrounded by trees on both sides of the track. This station has trees over the platform.

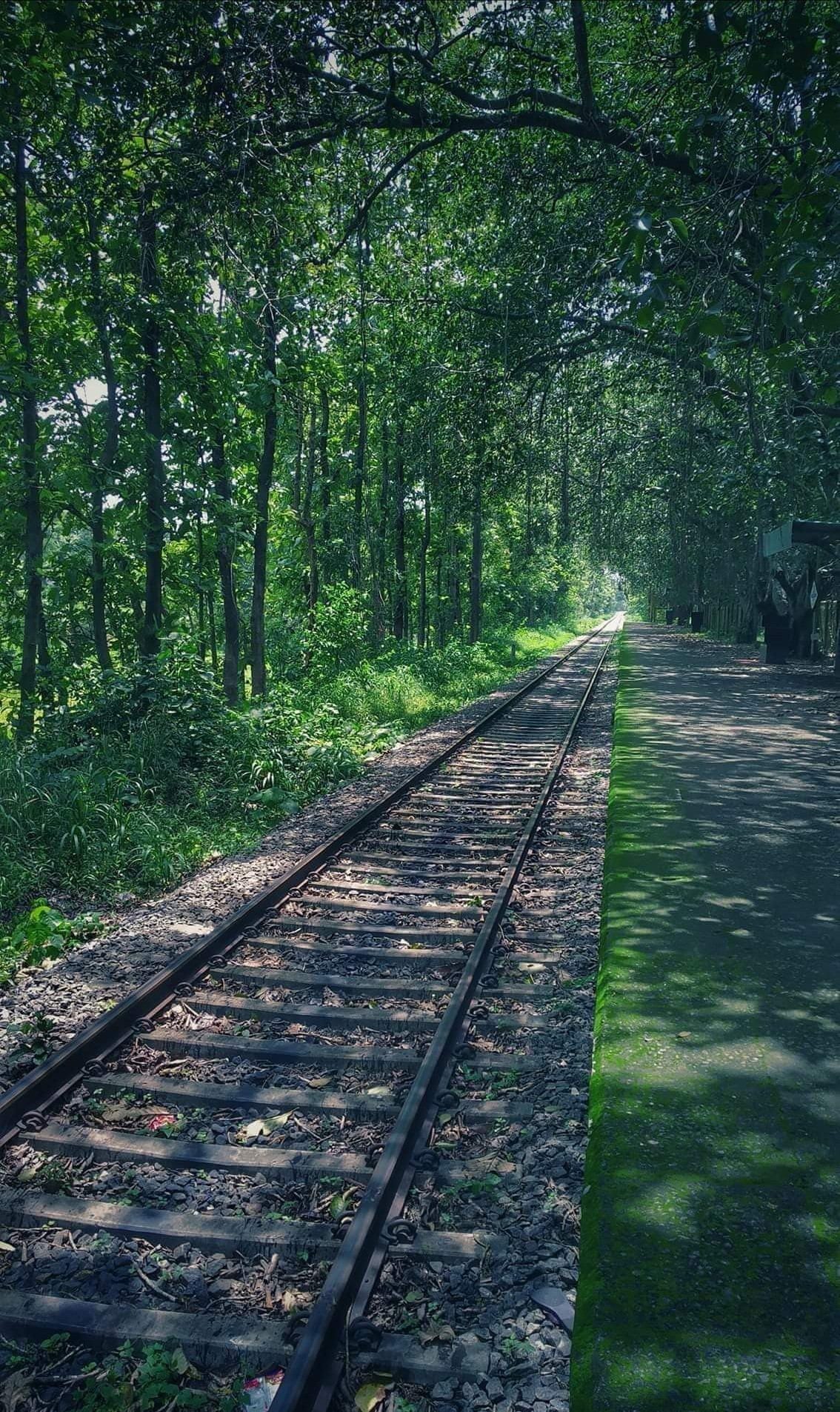
Vallapuzha Railway

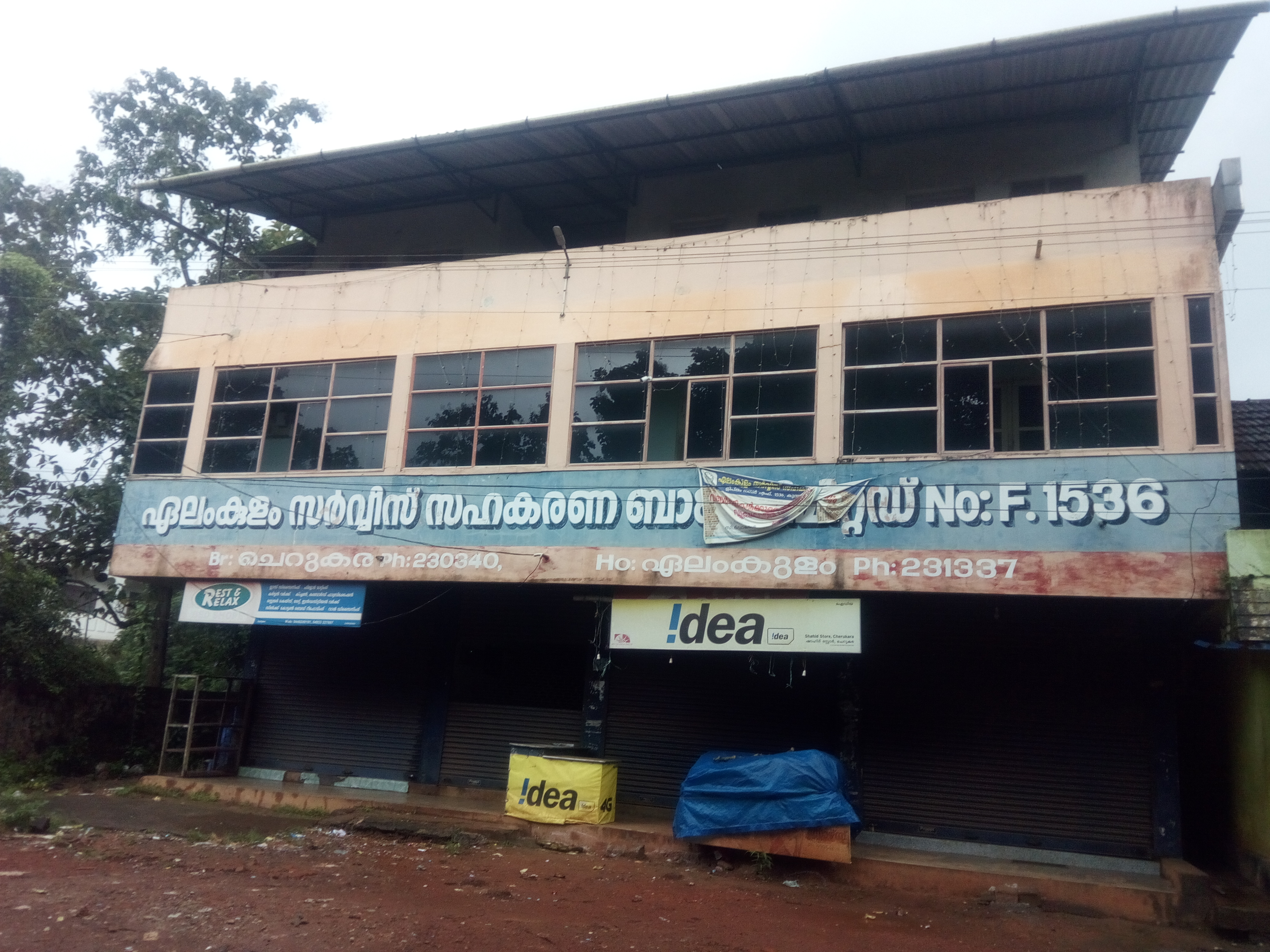
Cherukara co operative bank

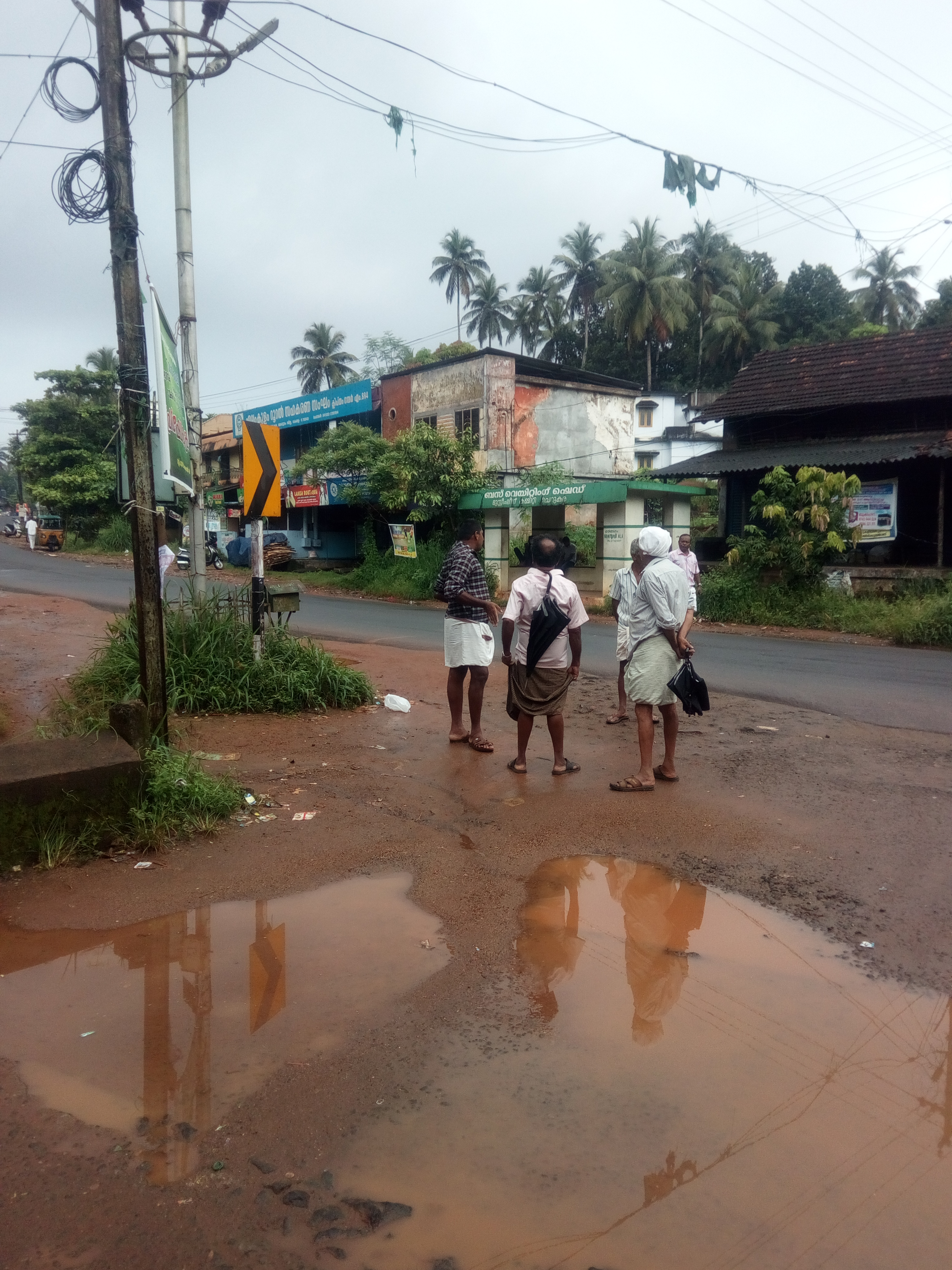
Cherukara bus stop

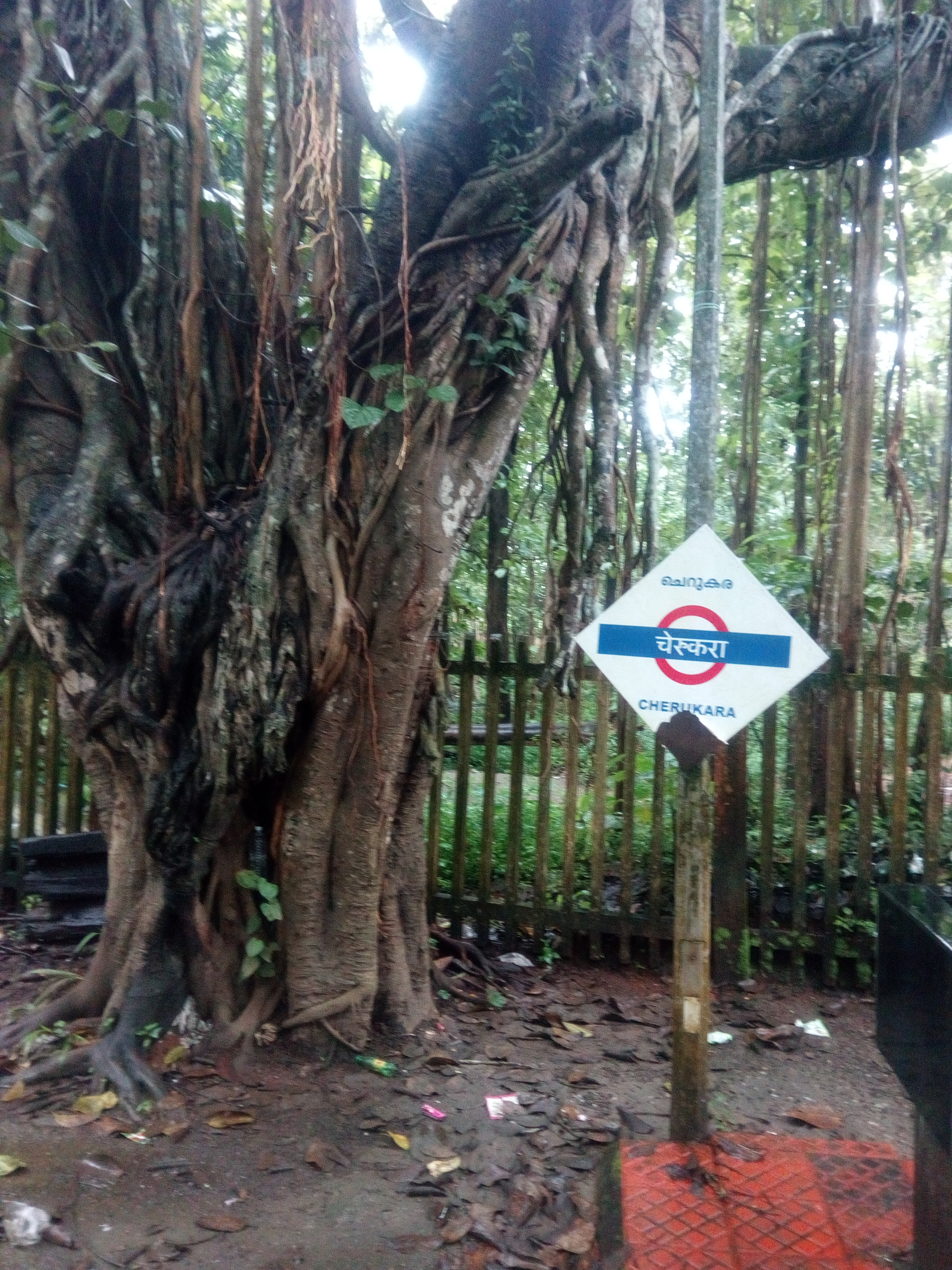
Name board

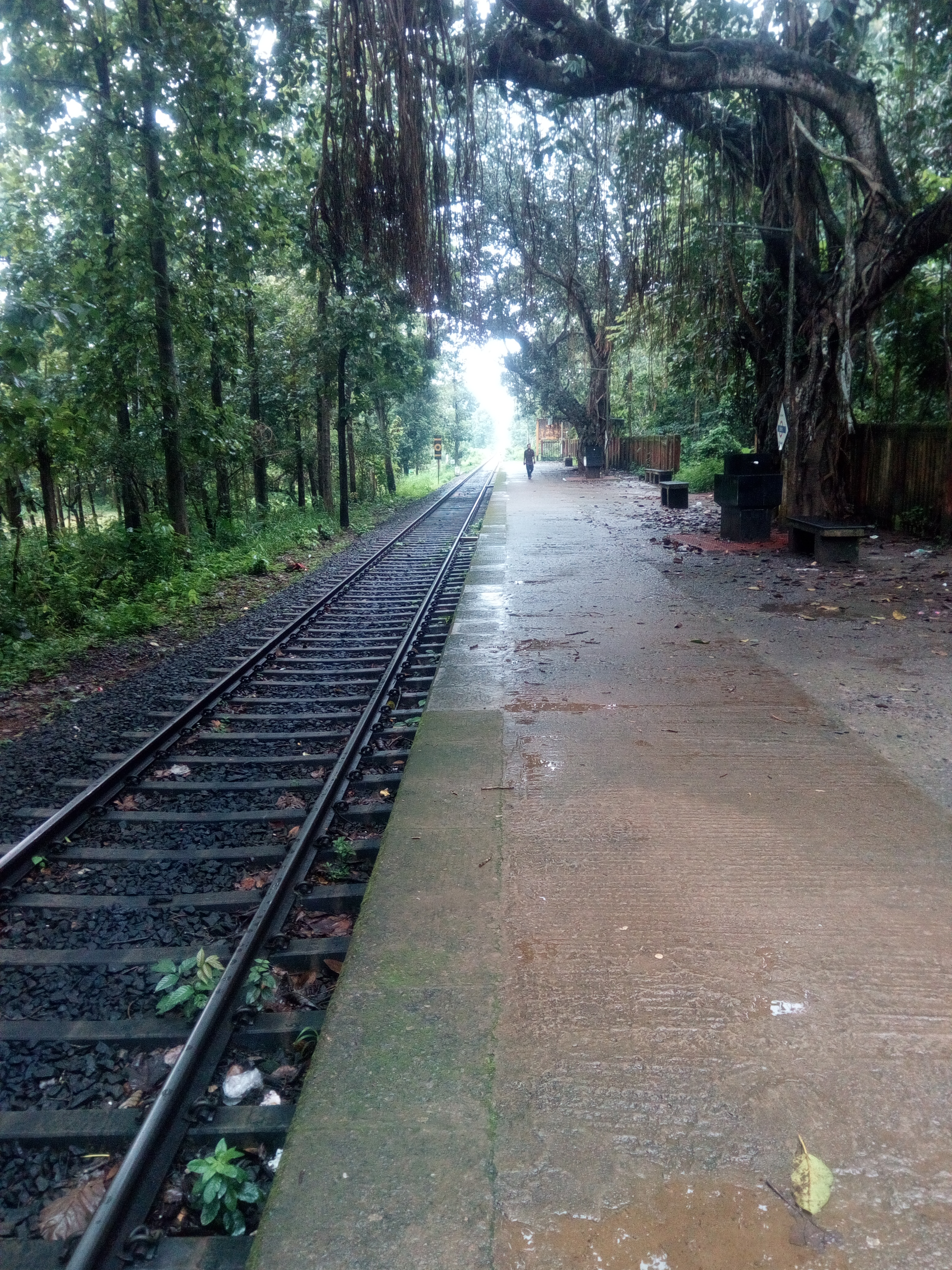
Rail track

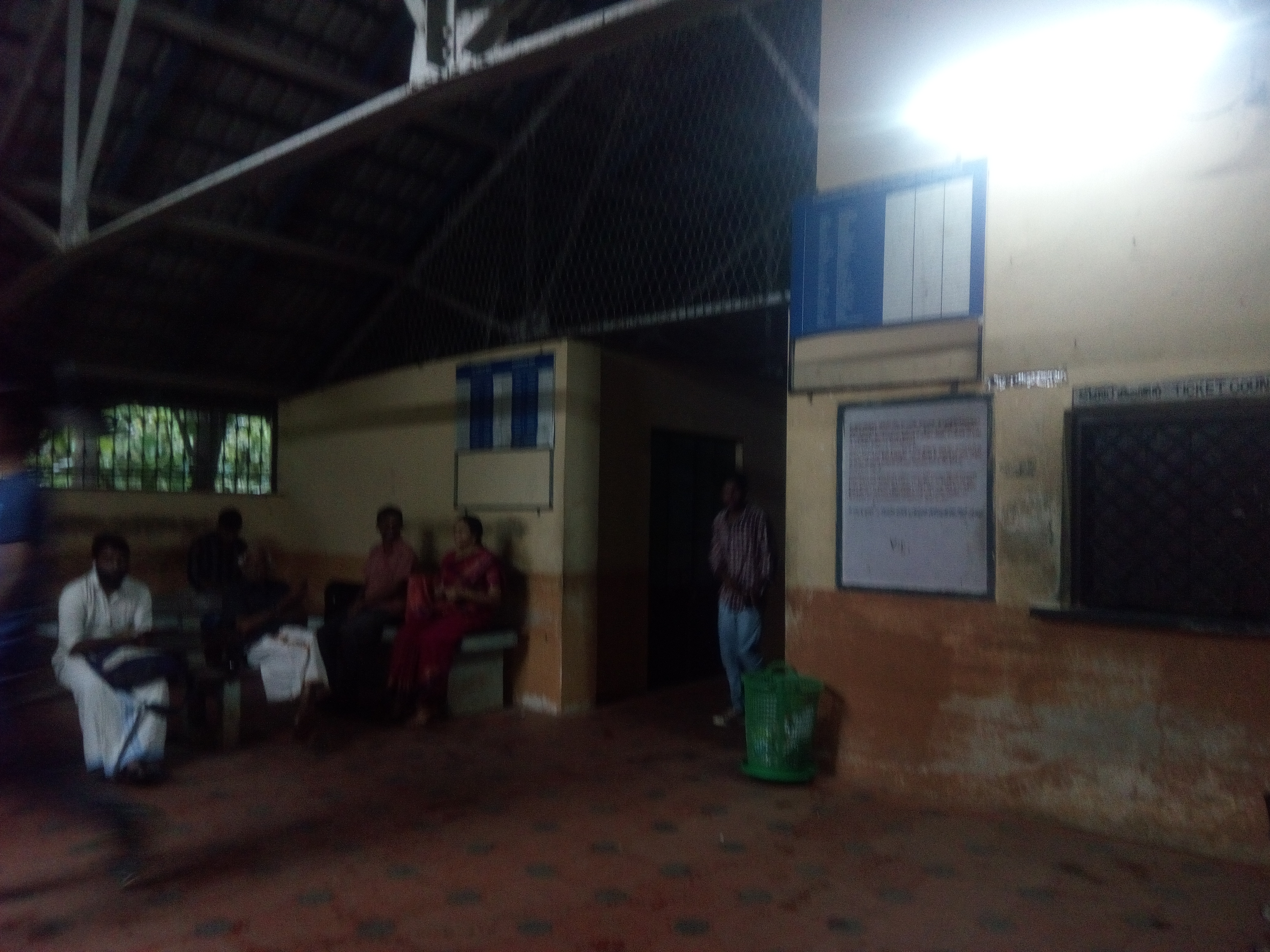
Office

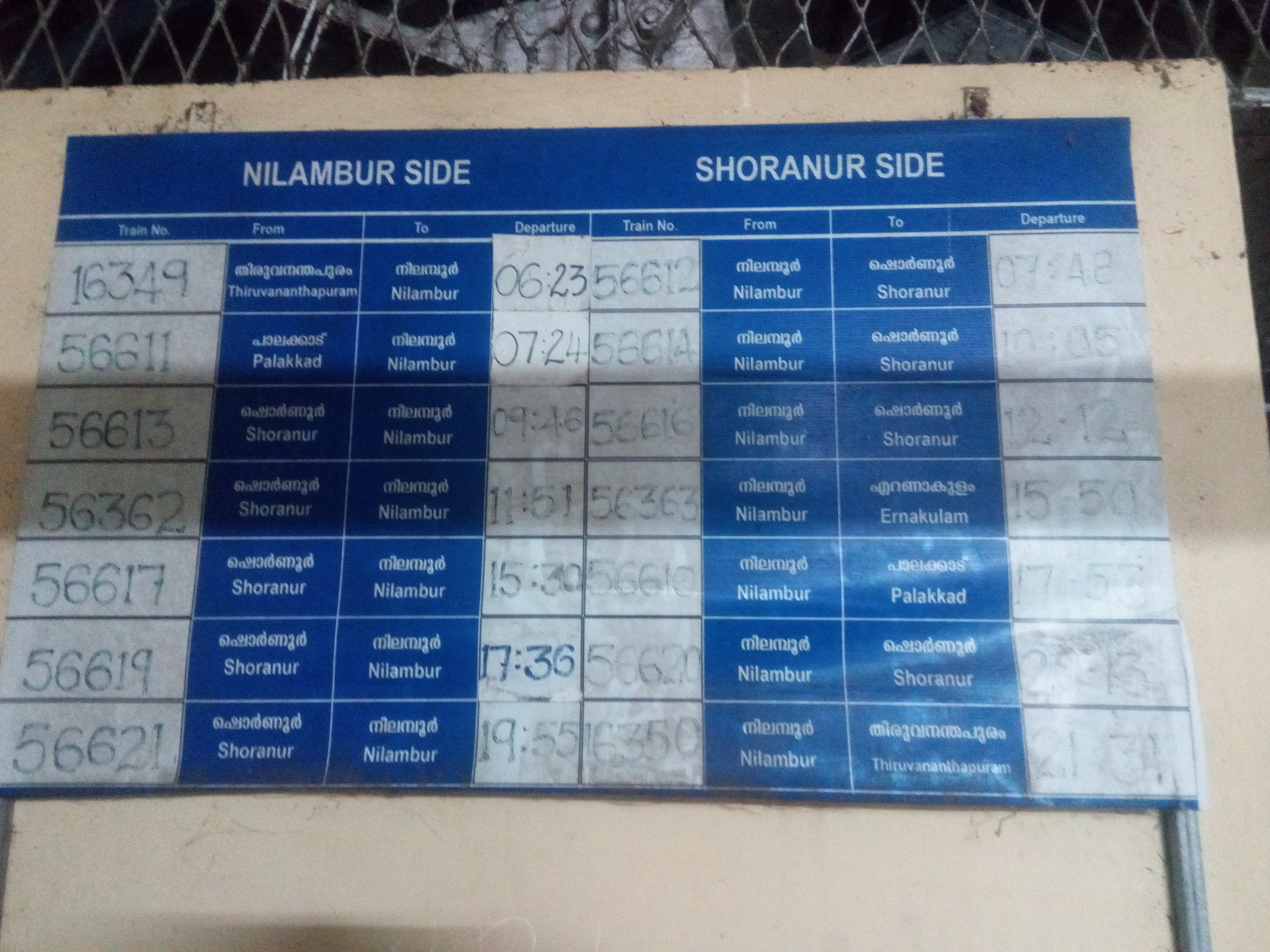
Time table
