= Pattikkad, Malappuram =

Pattikkad
- village
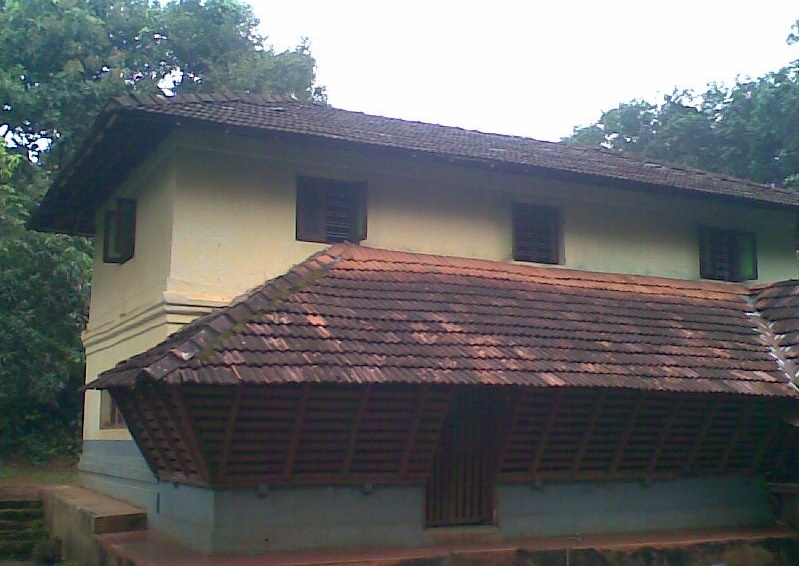
- Ancestral Architecture in Pattikkad

- Location in Kerala, India Pattikkad (India)
- Coordinates: 11°1′0″N 76°13′0″E
- Country: India
- State: Kerala
- District: Malappuram

Languages
  - Official: Malayalam, English
- Time zone: UTC+5:30 (IST)
- Vehicle registration: KL- 53
- Nearest town: Perinthalmanna (6 km)
- Climate: Tropical monsoon (Köppen)
- Avg. summer temperature: 35 °C (95 °F)
- Avg. winter temperature: 20 °C (68 °F)

Pattikkad is a village in Malappuram district of Kerala, India. It is located about 6 km from Perinthalmanna, in the Valancheri–Nilambur road. Pattikkad railway station lies on the Nilambur-Shoranur line. There are two Arabic colleges.

== Transportation ==
National Highway 66 passes through Valanchery and the northern stretch connects to Goa and Mumbai. The southern stretch connects to Cochin and Trivandrum. National Highway 966 connects it with Palakkad, Malappuram and Kozhikode. The nearest airport is at Kozhikode. The nearest major railway station is at Shoranur Junction. The nearest railway station is at Pattikkad railway station.
