= Vaniyambalam railway station =

Railway station in Kerala, India

General information
- Location: Malappuram; Palakkad; India
- Coordinates: 10.981228°N 76.207931°E
- Owner: Indian Railways
- Line: Nilambur–Shoranur line
- Platforms: 2
- Tracks: 2

Other information
- Status: Active
- Station code: VNB

History
- Opened: 1921; 105 years ago

Services
Preceding station	Indian Railways	Following station
Thodiyappulam towards Shoranur Junction	Southern Railway zone Shoranur–Nilambur section	Nilambur Road Terminus
Route map
Location

Vaniyambalam railway station (station code: VNB) is an NSG–5 category Indian railway station in Palakkad railway division of Southern Railway zone. It is a minor railway station serving the town of Wandoor in the Malappuram district of Kerala, India. It lies in the Shoranur–Nilambur section of the Southern Railways. Trains halting at the station connect the town to prominent cities in India such as Nilambur, Shoranur and Angadipuram.
