= Angadipuram railway station =

Railway station in Kerala, India

Angadippuram Railway Station
- അങ്ങാടിപ്പുറം റെയിൽവേ സ്റ്റേഷൻ

General information
- Location: Angadippuram, Malappuram district, Kerala, India
- Coordinates: 10.981228°N 76.207931°E
- System: Regional rail
- Owner: Indian Railways
- Line: Nilambur–Shoranur line
- Platforms: 2
- Tracks: 3

Construction
- Depth: 6,000 ft (1,800 m)
- Platform levels: 2

Other information
- Status: Functioning
- Station code: AAM
- Zone(s): Southern Railway zone
- Division(s): Palakkad

History
- Opened: 1921; 105 years ago
- Closed: 2023
- Rebuilt: 2025

Services
Preceding station	Indian Railways	Following station
Cherukara towards Shoranur Junction	Southern Railway zone Shoranur–Nilambur section	Pattikkad towards Nilambur Road
Route map
Location
- Location within Kerala Location within India

Angadippuram railway station (station code: AAM) is an NSG–5 category Indian railway station in Palakkad railway division of Southern Railway zone. It is a railway station serving the towns of Angadipuram and Perinthalmanna (2.5 km) in the Malappuram District of Kerala, India. It lies on the Nilambur–Shoranur line of Palakkad division, Southern Railways. Trains halting at the station connect the town to other parts of Kerala such as Nilambur, Shoranur, Ernakulam, Kottayam and Thiruvananthapuram. It is also the nearest railway station to the district headquarters in Malappuram (20 km).

== Shoranur–Nilambur railway line ==
The Nilambur–Shoranur railway line is a branch line of the Southern Railway Zone in Kerala state and one of the shortest broad-gauge railway lines in India. It is a single line with 66 kilometres (41 mi) length running from Shoranur Junction (in Palakkad district) to Nilambur railway station (in Malappuram district). This station is located at a distance of 2.5 kilometres (1.6 mi) from Perinthalmanna and 20 kilometres (12 mi) from Malappuram town.

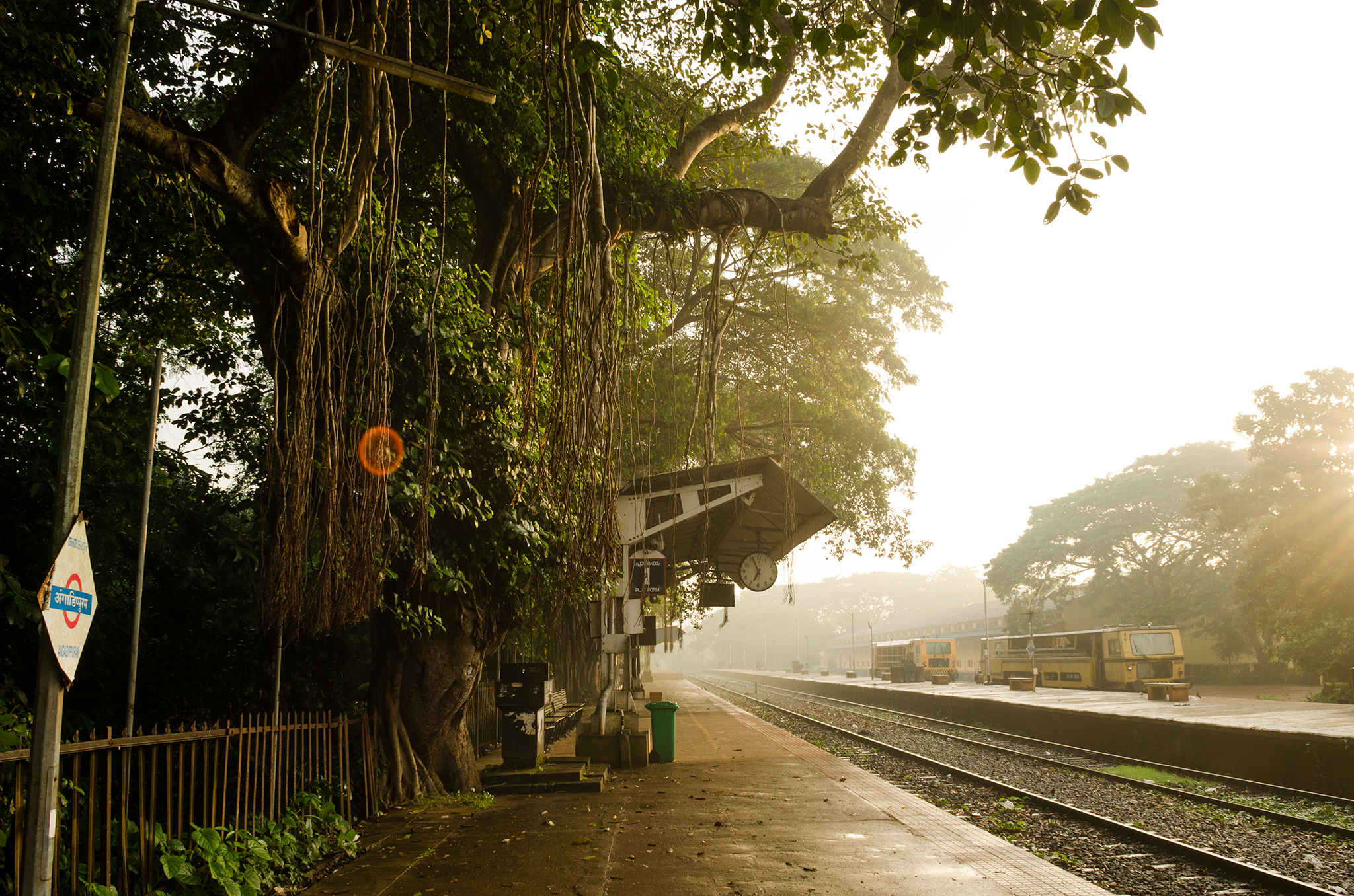
Scenery

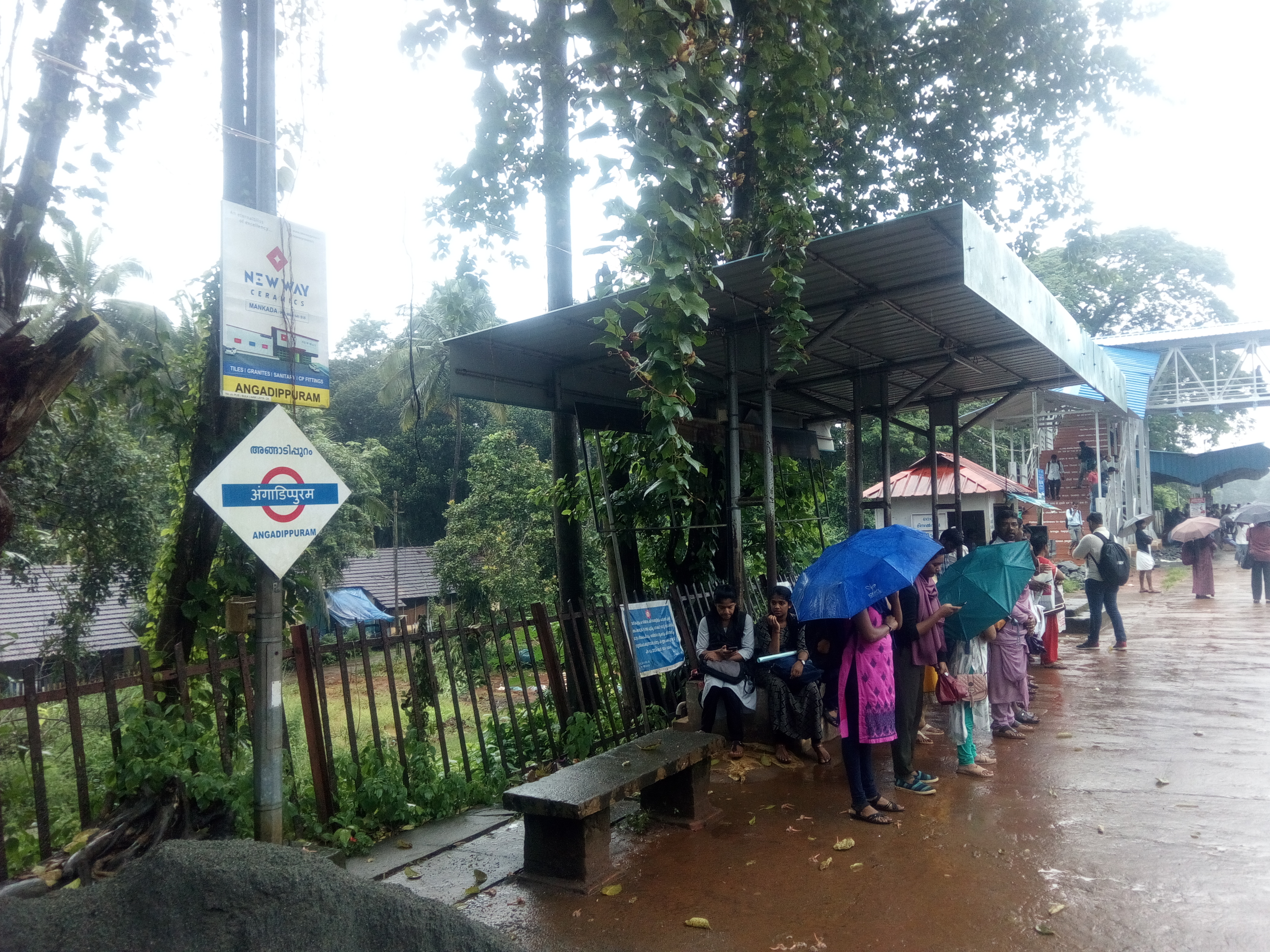
waiting shed

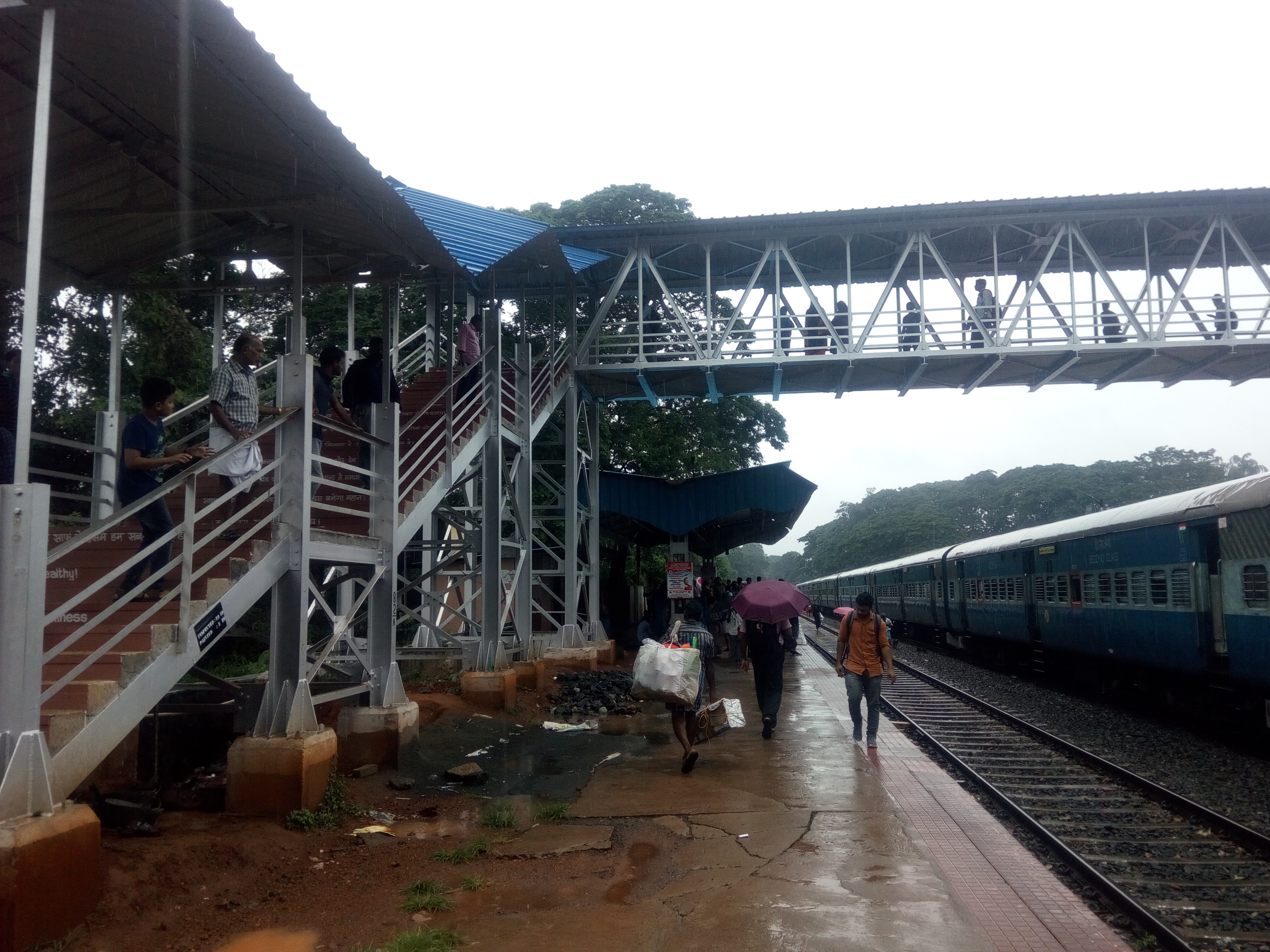
foot overbridge

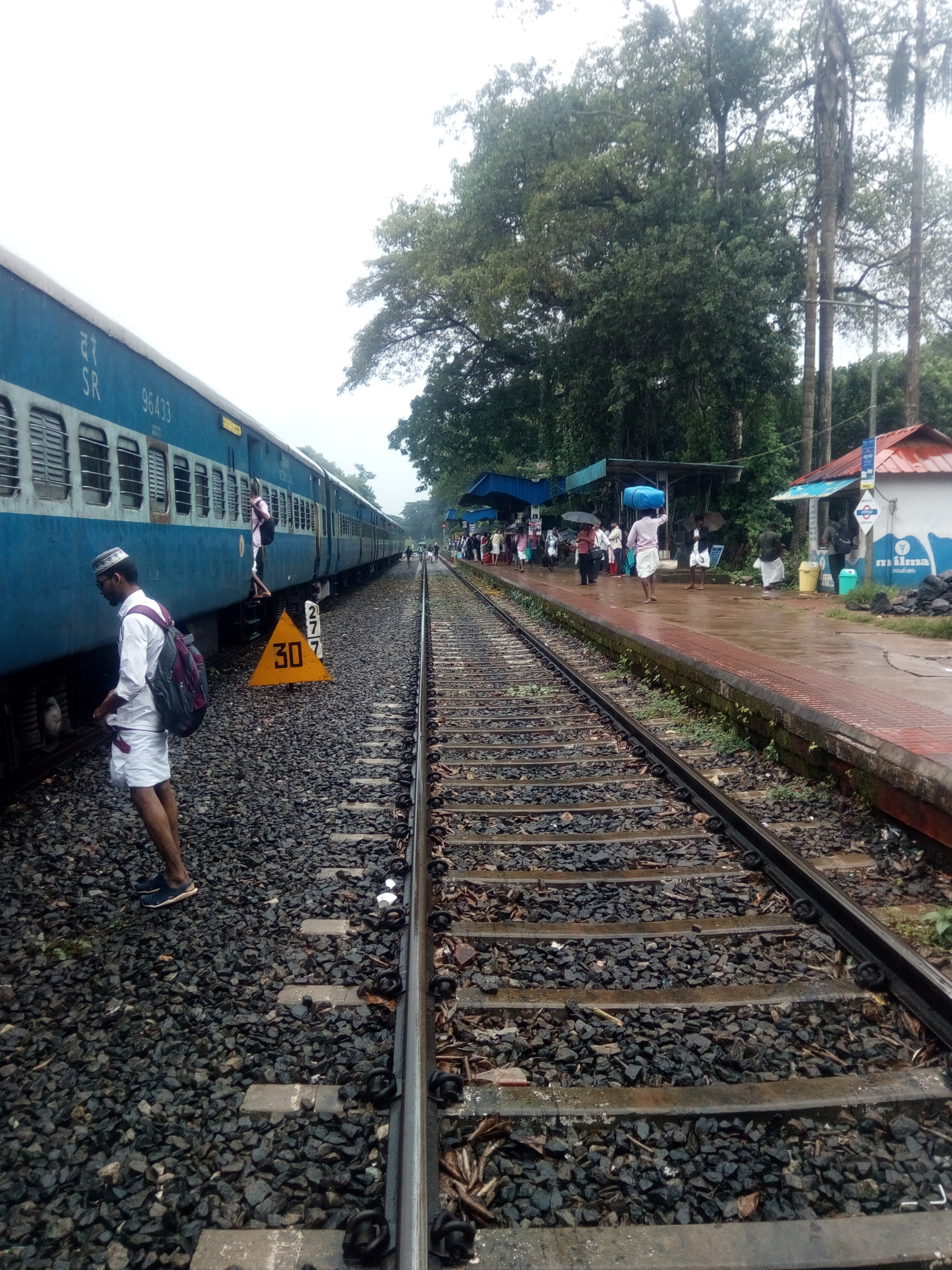
rail track

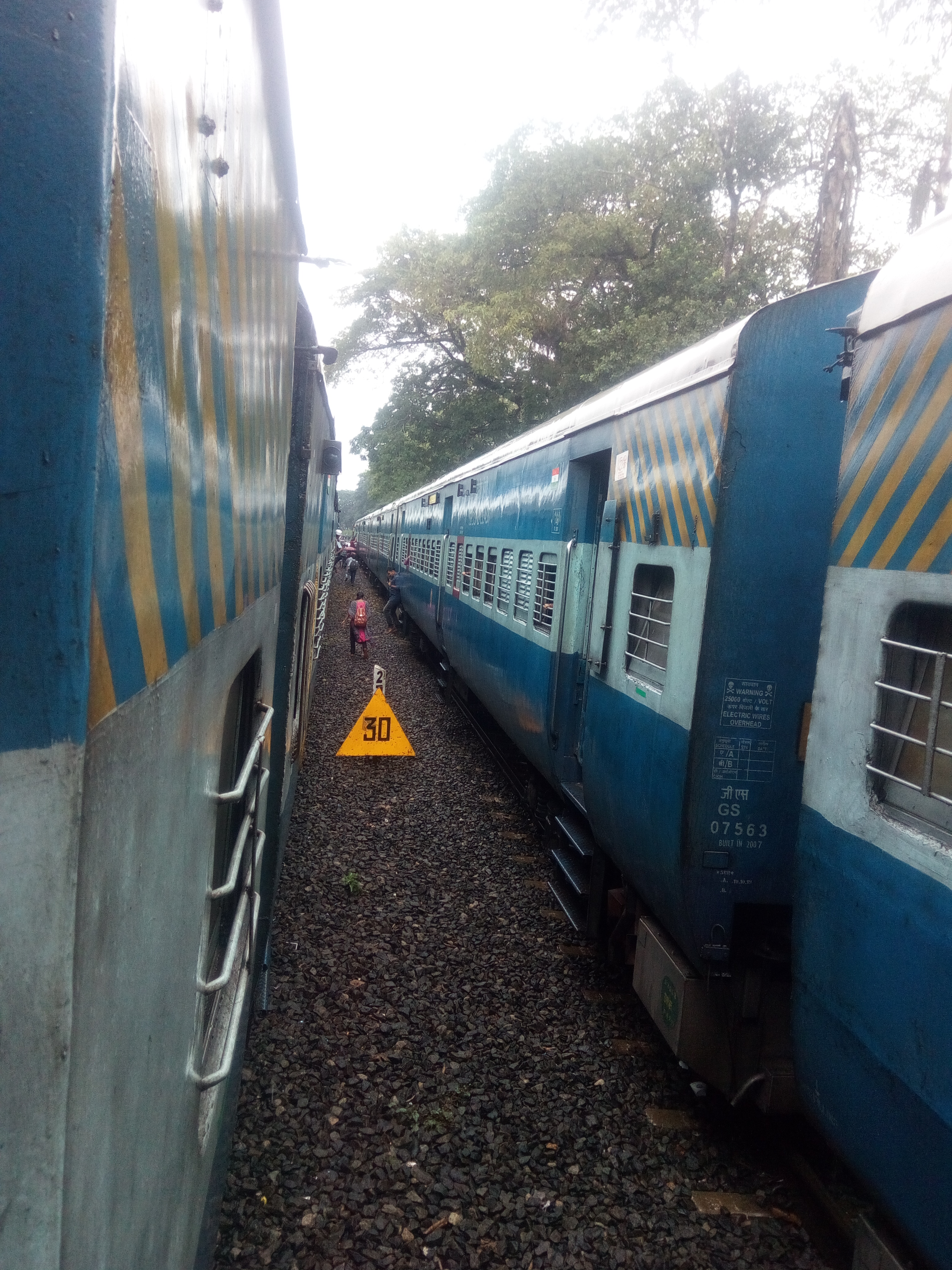
trains crossing

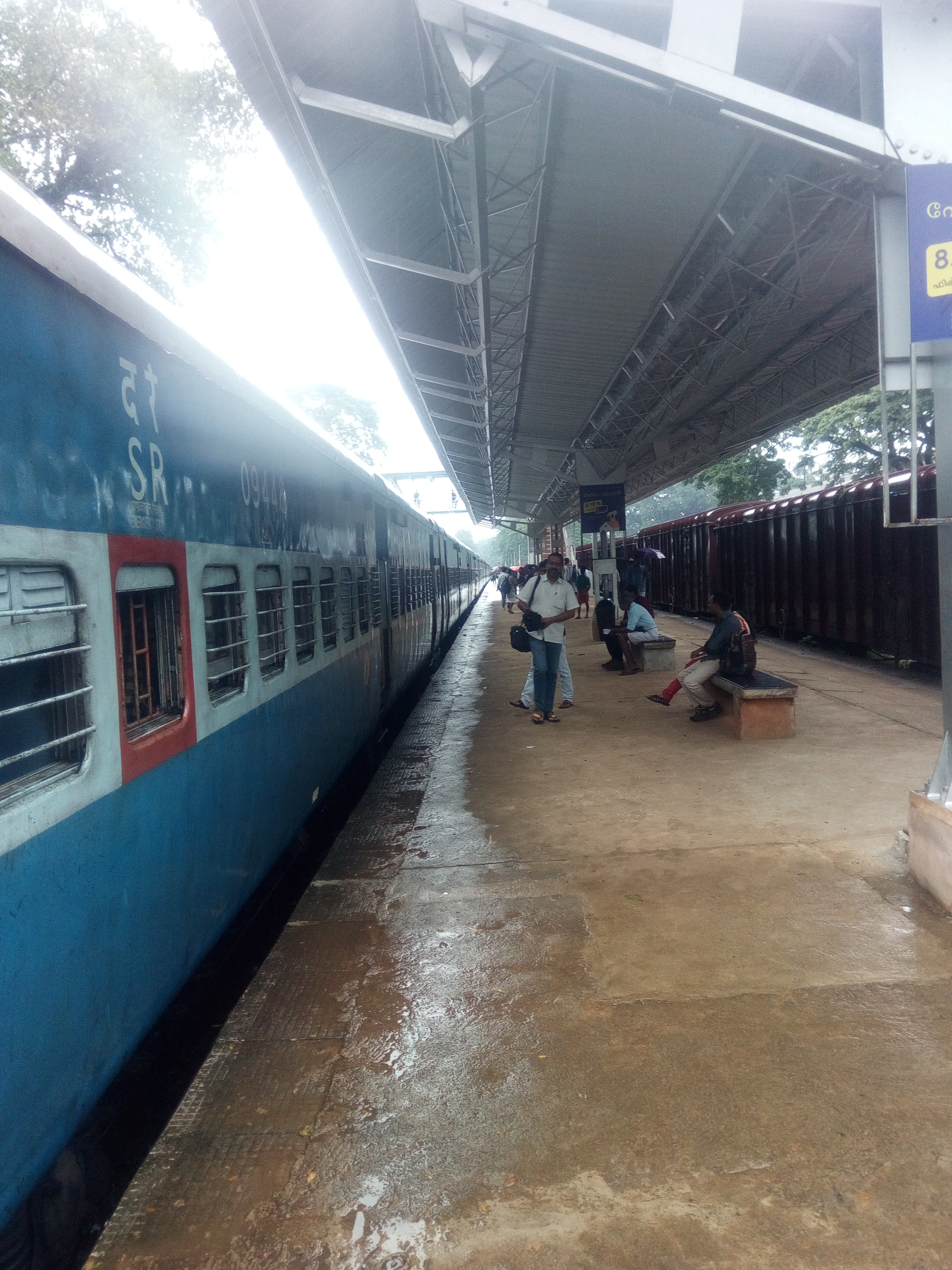
train at platform

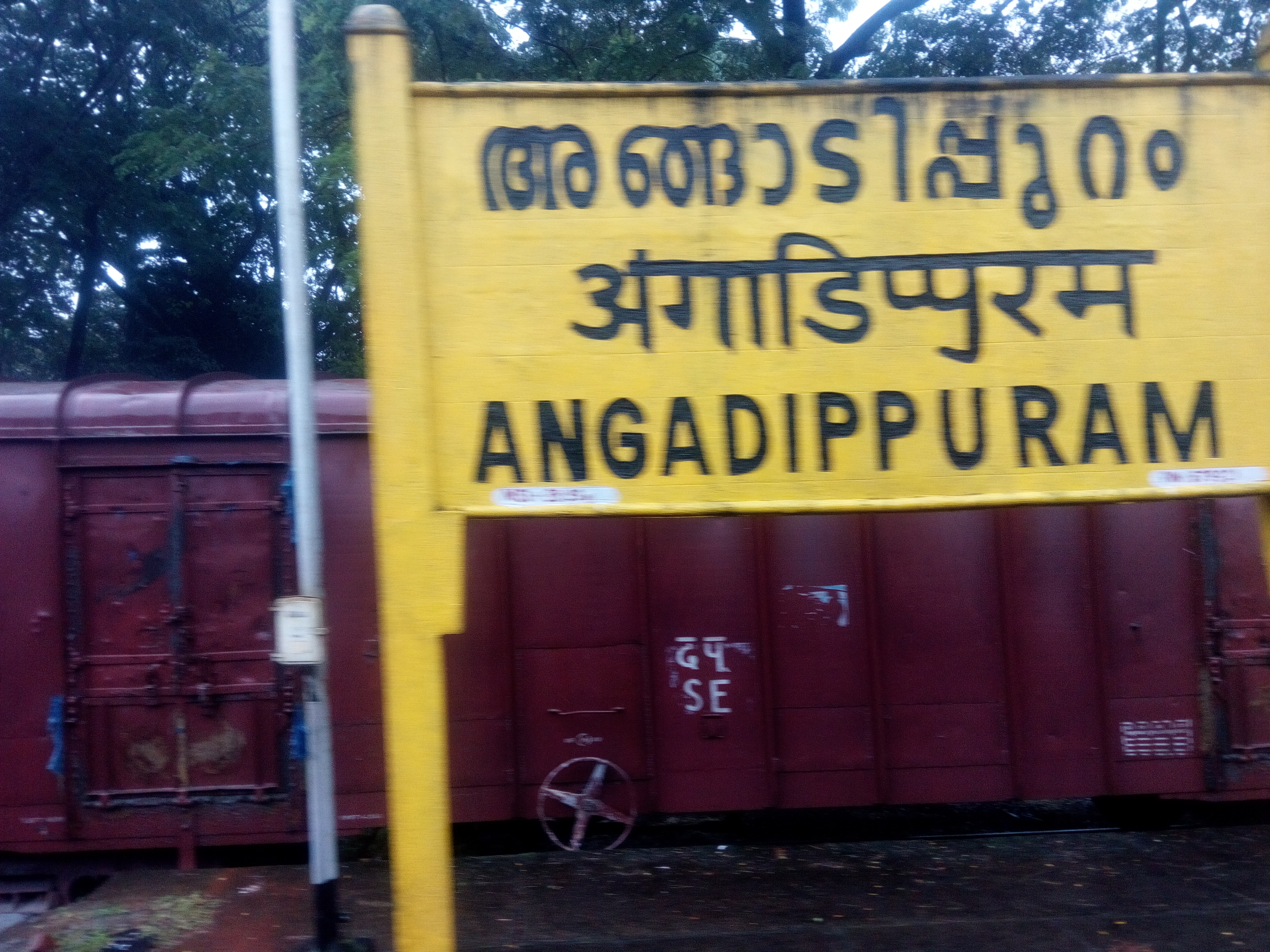
name board

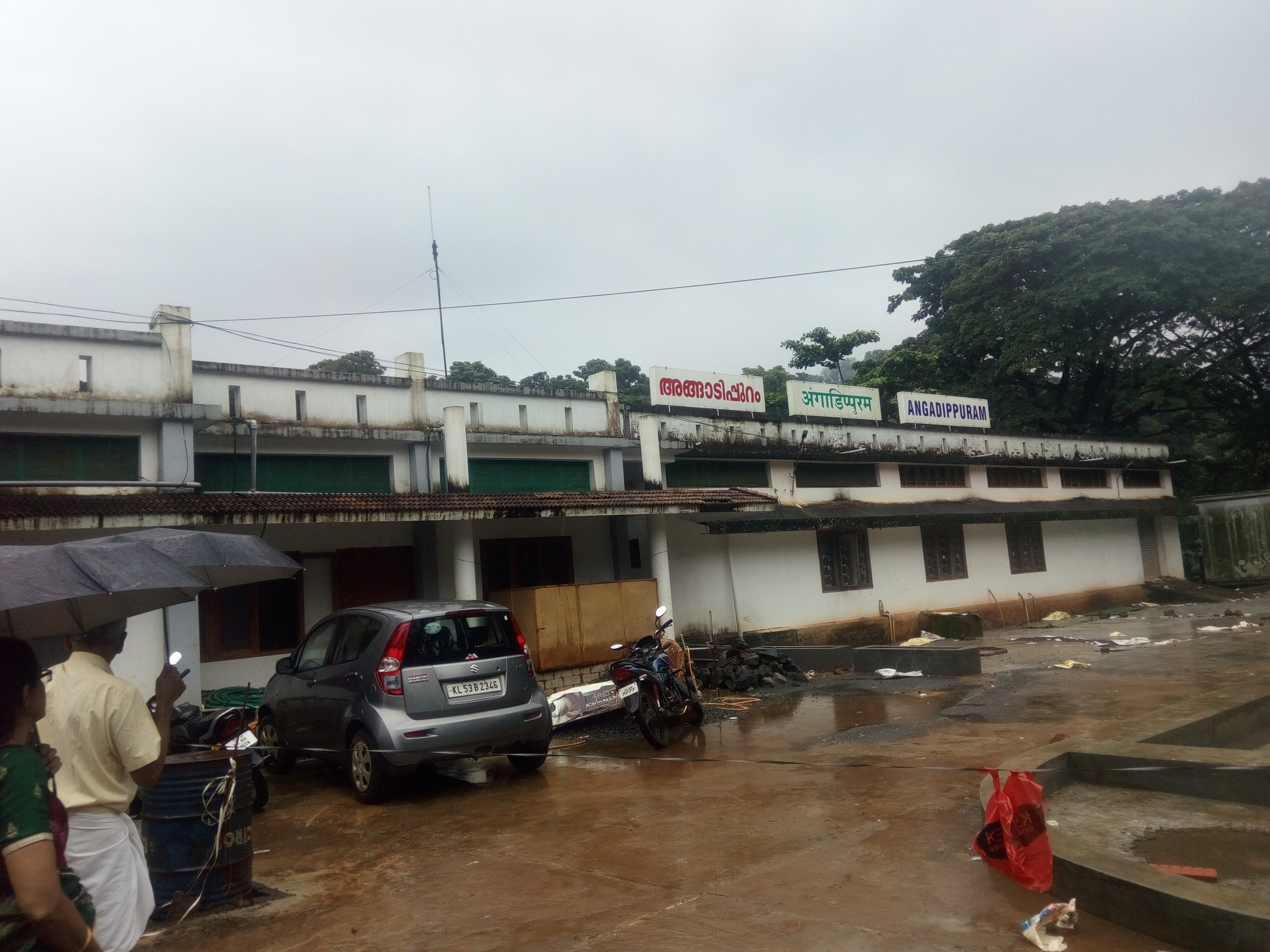
office building

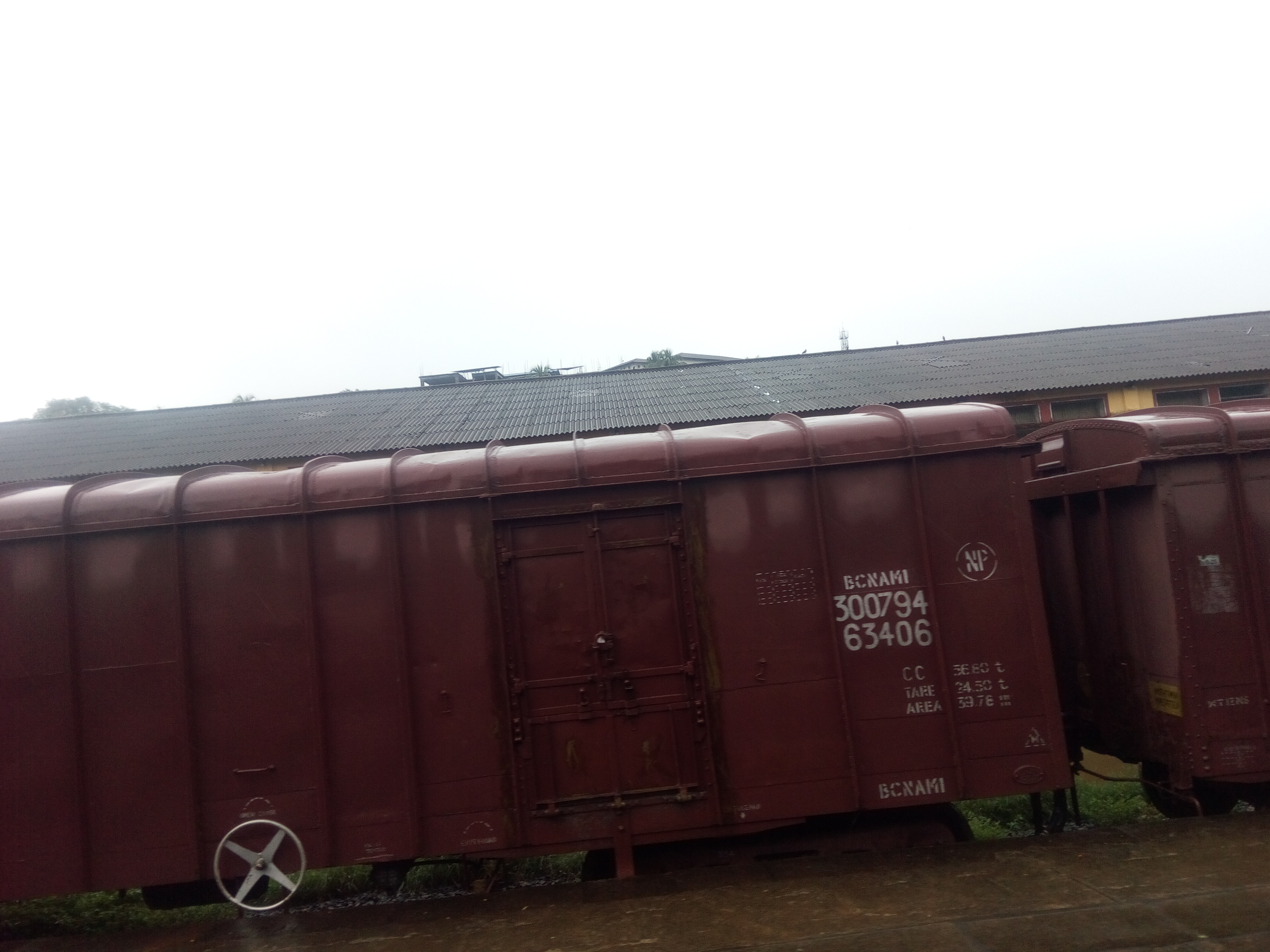
food corporation godown

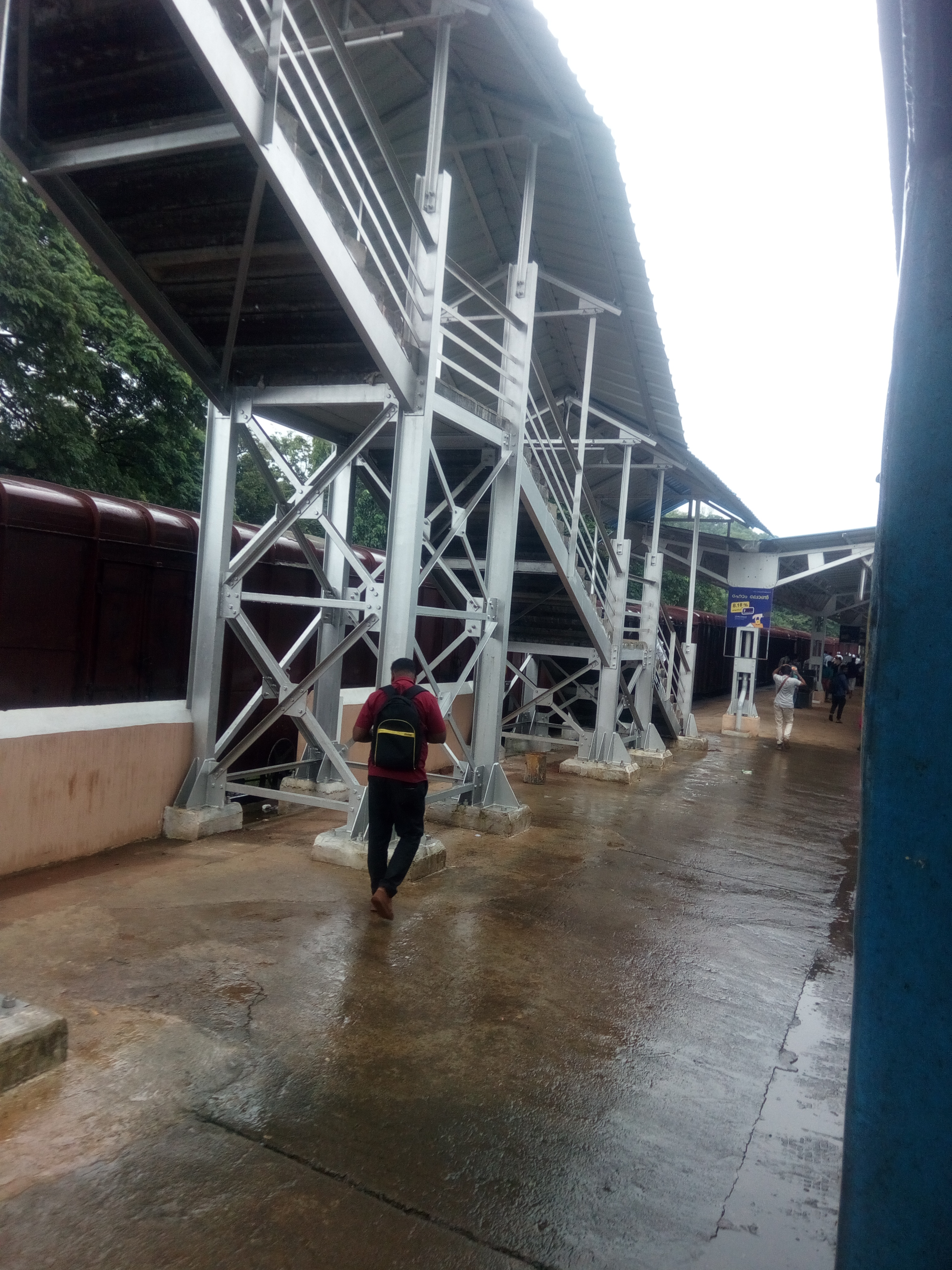
overbridge

office
