= Pattikkad railway station =

Railway station in Kerala, India

- Pattikkad railway station (2006)

General information
- Location: Pattikkad; Kerala, India
- Coordinates: 10.981228°N 76.207931°E
- Owner: Indian Railways
- Line: Nilambur–Shoranur line
- Platforms: 1
- Tracks: 1

Other information
- Status: Operating
- Station code: PKQ
- Fare zone: Southern Railway zone

History
- Opened: 1921; 105 years ago

Services
Preceding station	Indian Railways	Following station
Angadipuram towards Shoranur Junction	Southern Railway zone Shoranur–Nilambur section	Melattur towards Nilambur Road
Route map
Location

Pattikkad railway station is a railway station in the Malappuram district of Kerala. It lies on the Nilambur-Shoranur line of the Southern Railways. It is located halfway between Nilambur Road and Shoranur Junction stations, about 33 km (21 mi) from each of these stations.

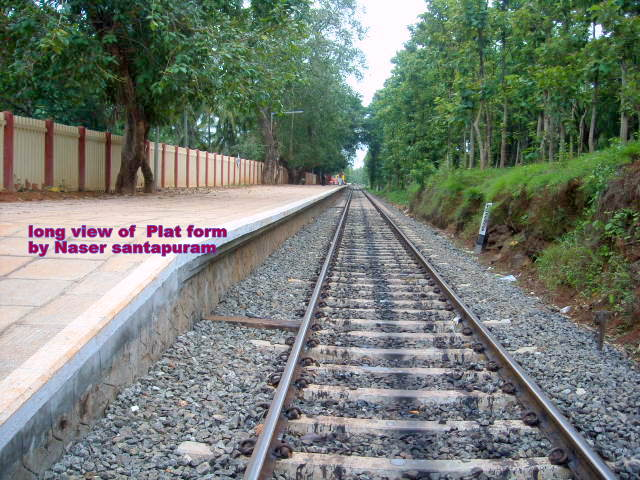
Railway line at Pattikkad
