= Nilambur Road railway station =

Railway station in Kerala, India

Nilambur Road
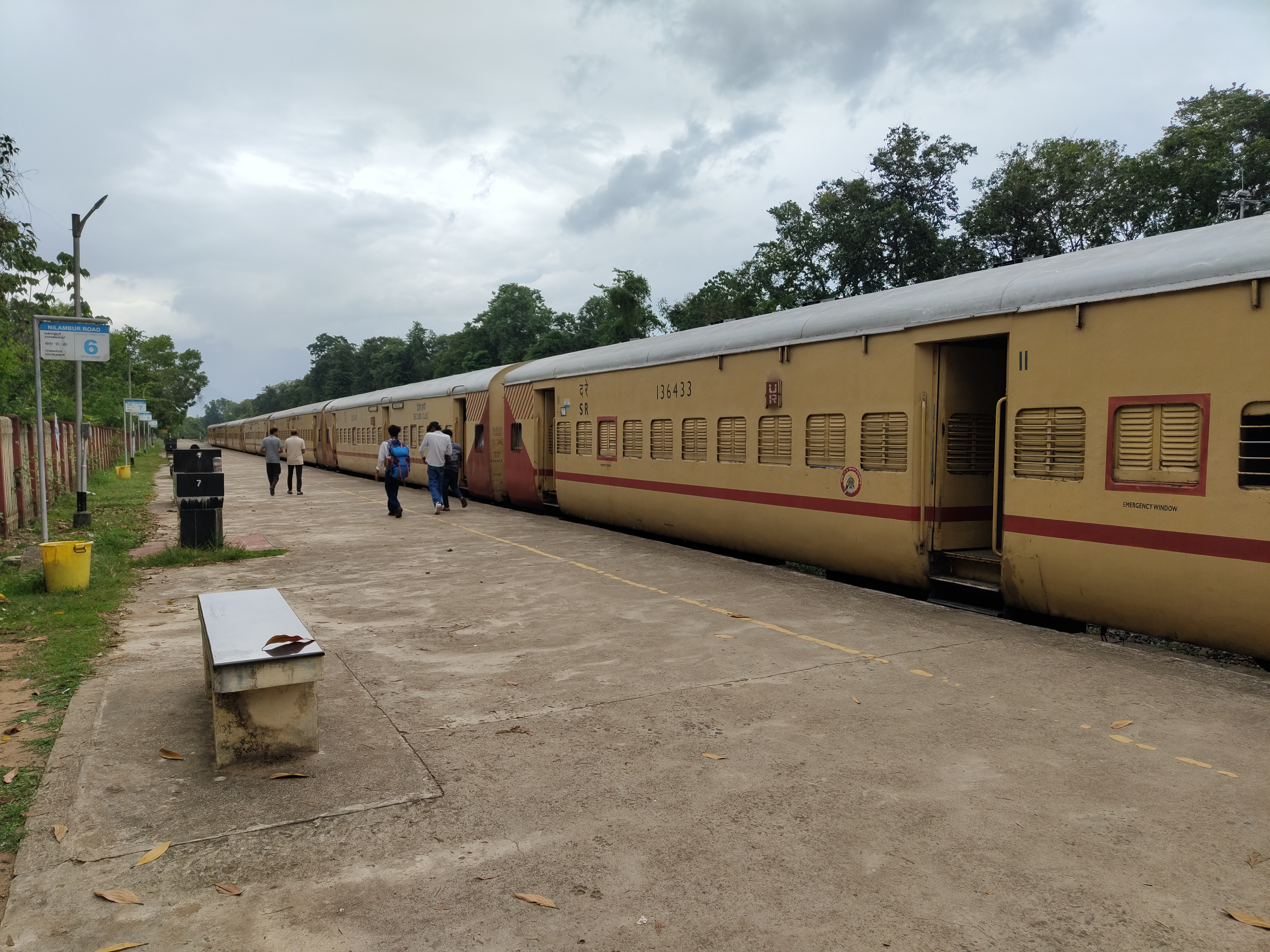
- Nilambur Road railway station

General information
- Location: Nilambur, Kerala; India
- Coordinates: 11.2824°N 76.2511°E
- System: Light rail
- Operator: Southern Railway
- Line: Nilambur–Shoranur railway line
- Platforms: 2
- Tracks: 4
- Bus routes: 3

Construction
- Structure type: Standard (on-ground station)
- Parking: Available

Other information
- Status: Operational
- Station code: NIL
- Zone(s): Southern Railway zone
- Division(s): Palakkad
- Classification: NSG – 5; Class 'D'

History
- Opened: 1921; 105 years ago

Passengers
- 2,644 per day
Location
- Location within India Location within Kerala

Nilambur Road railway station (station code: NIL) is an NSG–5 category Indian railway station in Palakkad railway division of Southern Railway zone. It is a railway terminus serving the town of Nilambur in the Malappuram district of Kerala, India. It is the station for the Shoranur–Nilambur Road spur rail line of Palakkad Division of Southern Railways. Trains halting at the station connect the town to prominent cities in Kerala, such as Palakkad, Thrissur, Ernakulam, Kottayam, and Thiruvananthapuram.

== Shoranur–Nilambur railway line ==
The Nilambur–Shoranur line is a spur line of the Southern Railway Zone in Kerala state and one of the shortest broad-gauge railway lines in India and the only terminus railway station in Kerala. It is a single electrified line with 66 kilometres (41 mi) length running from Shoranur Junction (in Palakkad district) to Nilambur railway station (in Malappuram district). This station is 4 km from the town of Nilambur on the Kozhikode–Ooty highway. Shoranur–Nilambur Road passenger trains ply this route. It is 40 kilometres (25 mi) away from Malappuram town.
