= List of railway stations in Kerala =

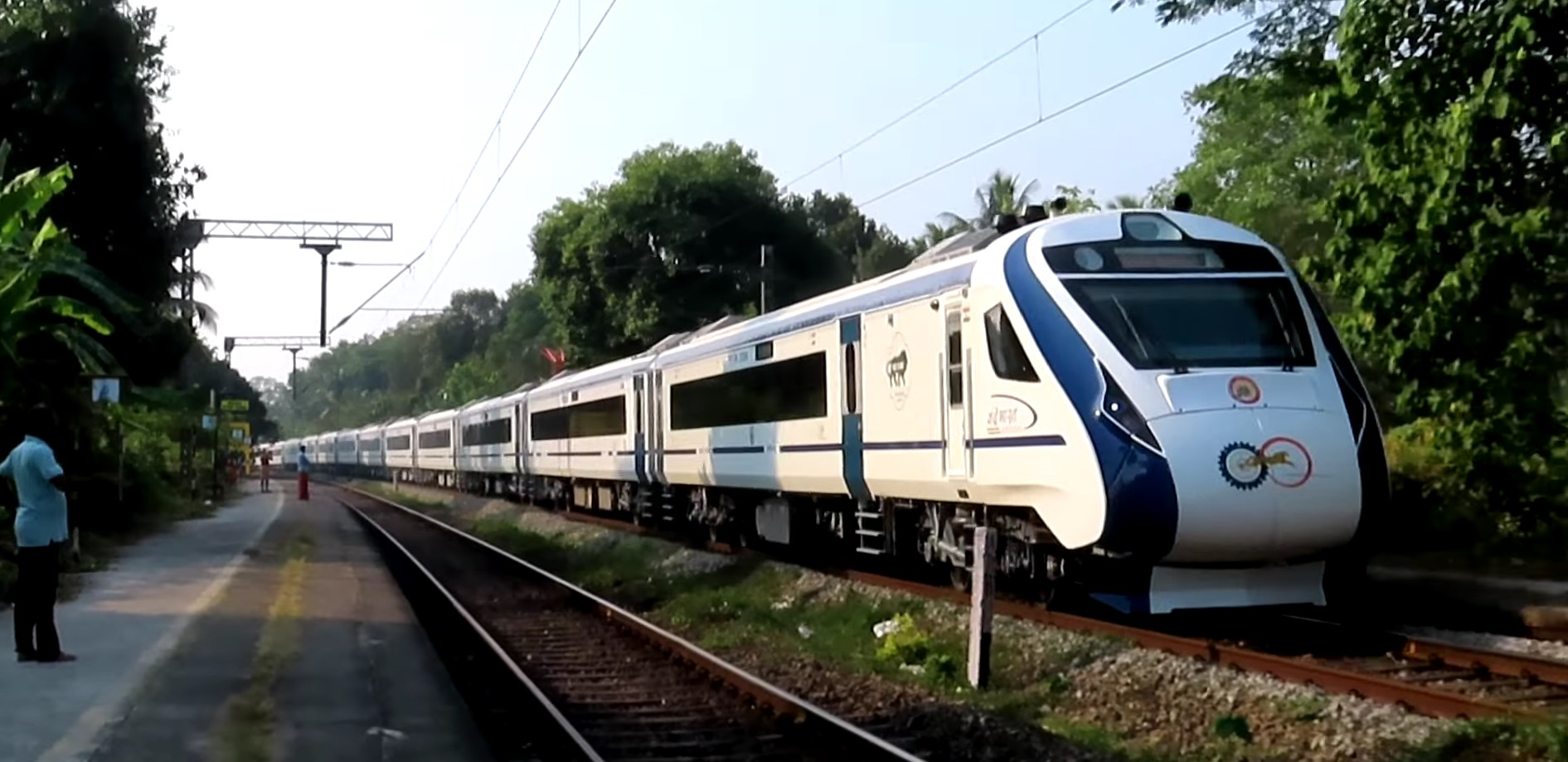
Vande Bharat Express in Kerala, through Kottayam line

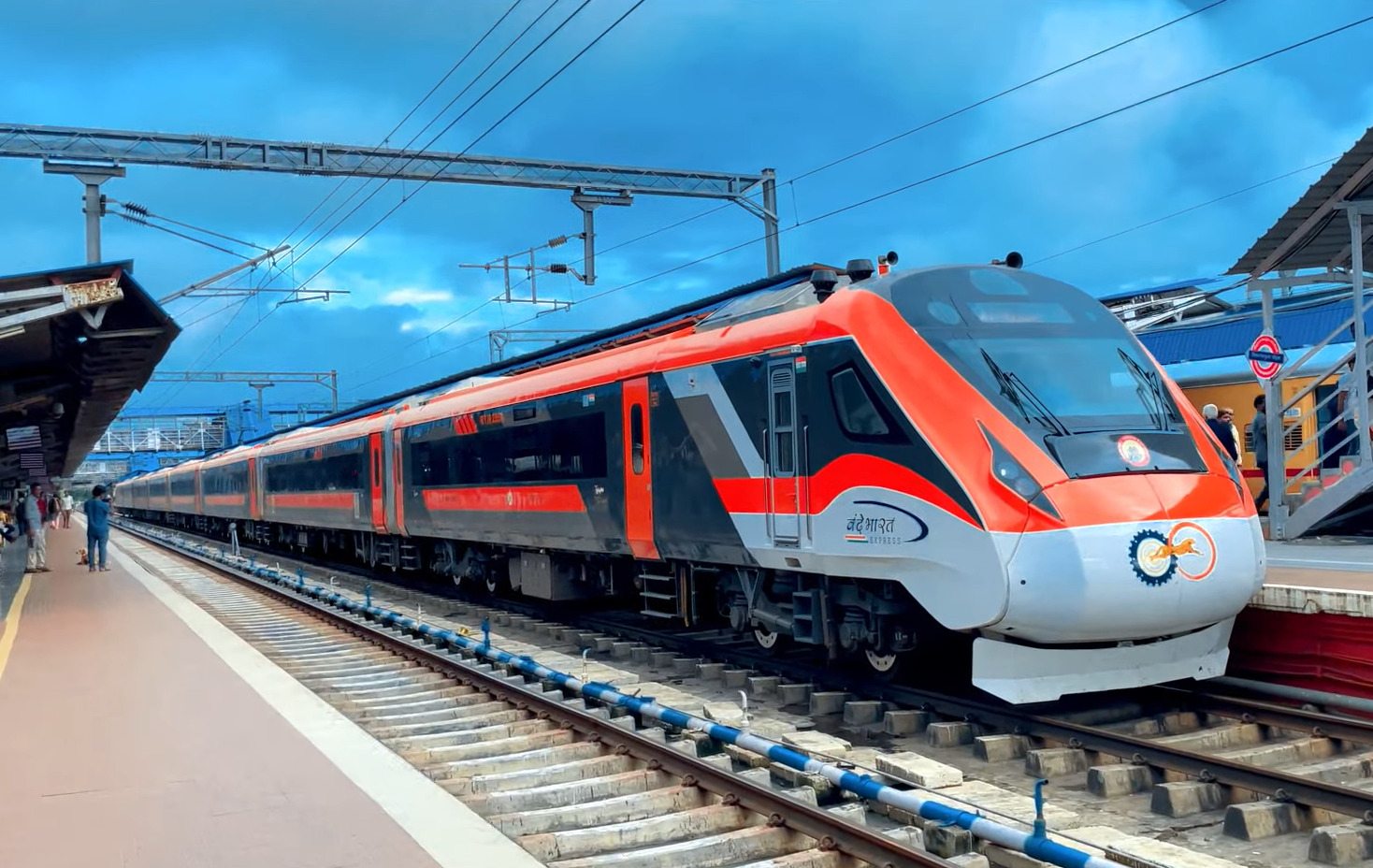
Vande Bharat Express in Kerala, through Alappuzha line

The rail network in Kerala is operated by Indian Railways. The state falls in the Southern Railway zone. The railways connects the most major towns and cities except those in the highland districts of Idukki and Wayanad.

The total railway network in the state is 1054 kms in length and is controlled by three out of six divisions of the Southern Railway: Thiruvananthapuram railway division headquartered at Thiruvananthapuram, Palakkad railway division headquartered at Palakkad and Madurai railway division headquartered at Madurai, Tamil Nadu.

The first railway line in the state was laid from Tirur to Chaliyam (Kozhikode), with the oldest Railway Station at Tirur, passing through Tanur, Parappanangadi, Vallikkunnu, and Kadalundi. The railway was extended from Tirur to Kuttippuram through Tirunavaya in the same year. It was again extended from Kuttippuram to Shoranur through Pattambi in 1862, resulting in the establishment of Shoranur Junction railway station, which is also the largest railway junction in the state. Major railway transport between Chaliyam–Tirur began on 12 March 1861, from Tirur-Shoranur in 1862, from Shoranur–Cochin Harbour section in 1902, from Kollam–Sengottai on 1 July 1904, Kollam–Thiruvananthapuram on 4 January 1918, from Nilambur-Shoranur in 1927, from Ernakulam–Kottayam in 1956, from Kottayam–Kollam in 1958, from Thiruvananthapuram–Kanyakumari in 1979 and from the Thrissur-Guruvayur Section in 1994. The Nilambur–Shoranur line is one of the shortest broad gauge railway lines in India. It was established in the British era for the transportation of Nilambur teaks and Angadipuram Laterite to United Kingdom through the port at Kozhikode. The presence of Palakkad Gap on Western Ghats makes the Shoranur Junction railway station important as it connects the southwestern coast of India (Mangalore) with the southeastern coast (Chennai). Kochi Metro is the metro rail system in the city of Kochi. It is the only metro rail system in Kerala.

== Major facts about Railways in Kerala ==
- The Tirur railway station, opened in 1861, is the oldest railway station in Kerala. The first railway service in Kerala was on 1861 March 12 and it serviced from Beypore to Tirur for 30.5 km.
- First Railway service in erstwhile Travancore was started on 1904 November 26. It was Kollam-Madras Meter-gauge line.
- Kollam district has the highest number of operational railway stations (25) in Kerala, while Palakkad district has the highest number of stations (28).
- Shoranur Junction(SRR) is the largest railway station in the state.
- Vembanad Rail Bridge 4.62 km in length connects Edappally and Vallarpadam Container Terminal in Kochi. It is the second longest rail bridge in India and it is dedicated solely for freight.
- Kollam railway station holds the record of having third longest railway platform in India and in the world.
- Kozhikode, Palakkad Junction, Ernakulam Junction, Alappuzha,Kottayam, Chengannur, Kollam Junction, and Thiruvananthapuram Central are the only stations where every passing train halts.

== Number of railway stations by district ==
No.	District	Operational stations	Total stations
1	Kollam	25	25
2	Palakkad	23	28
3	Thiruvananthapuram	20	20
4	Alappuzha	20	20
5	Thrissur	15	16
6	Kozhikode	15	15
7	Ernakulam	14	18
8	Malappuram	13	14
9	Kannur	13	13
10	Kasaragod	12	12
11	Kottayam	10	10
12	Pathanamthitta	1	1
		181	192

== Stations on Kanyakumari - Mangalore rail-route (via Kottayam) ==
Railway station	Station code	Railway station	Station code	Railway station	Station code
Parassala	PASA	Dhanuvachapuram (halt)	DAVM	Amaravila (halt)	AMVA
Neyyattinkara	NYY	Balaramapuram	BRAM	Thiruvananthapuram South (Nemom)	TVCS (old - NEM)
Thiruvananthapuram Central	TVC	Thiruvananthapuram Pettah	TVP	Thiruvananthapuram North (Kochuveli)	TVCN (old -KCVL)
Veli (halt)	VELI	Kazhakuttam	KZK	Kaniyapuram	KXP
Murukkampuzha	MQU	Perunguzhi (halt)	PGZ	Chirayinkeezh	CRY
Kadakavur	KVU	Akathumuri (halt)	AMY	Varkala Sivagiri	VAK
Edavai	EVA	Kappil	KFI		
Paravur	PVU	Mayyanad	MYY	Iravipuram (halt)	IRP
Kollam Jn.	QLN	Perinad (halt)	PRND	Munroturuttu (halt)	MQO
Sasthankotta	STKT	Karunagapalli	KPY	Ochira	OCR
Kayankulam Jn.	KYJ	Mavelikara	MVLK	Cheriyanad	CYN
Chengannur	CNGR	Tiruvalla	TRVL	Changanasseri	CGY
Chingavanam	CGV	Kottayam	KTYM	Kumaranallur (halt)	KFQ
Ettumanur	ETM	Kuruppantara	KRPP	Kaduturutty (halt)	KDTY
Vaikom Road	VARD	Piravam Road	PVRD	Kanjiramittam(halt)	KPTM
Mulanturutti	MNTT	Chottanikkara Road/ Kurikad (halt)	KFE	Tripunittura	TRTR
Ernakulam Jn.	ERS	Ernakulam Town	ERN	Idappalli	IPL
Kalamasseri	KLMR	Aluva	AWY	Chovvara (halt)	CWR
Angamali (for Kaladi)	AFK	Karukutty	KUC	Koratti Angadi (halt)	KRAN
Divine Nagar (halt)	DINR	Chalakudi	CKI	Irinjalakuda	IJK
Nellayi (halt)	NYI	Pudukad	PUK	Ollur	OLR
Thrisur	TCR	Punkunnam	PNQ	Mulagunnathukavu	MGK
Wadakancheri	WKI	Mullurkara (halt)	MUC	Vallattol Nagar	VTK
Shoranur Jn.	SRR	Karakkad	KRKD	Pattambi	PTB
Kodumunda (halt) ^{†}	KODN	Pallippuram	PUM	Perssannur (halt) ^{†}	PEU
Kuttippuram	KTU	Tirunnavaya	TUA	Tirur	TIR
Tanur	TA	Parappanangadi	PGI	Vallikunnu	VLI
Kadalundi	KN	Ferok	FK	Kallayi	KUL
Kozhikkode	CLT	Vellayil (halt) ^{†}	VLL	West Hill	WH
Elattur	ETR	Chemancheri (halt) ^{†}	CMC	Quilandi	QLD
Vellarakkad (halt) ^{†}	VEK	Tikkotti	TKT	Payyoli	PYOL
Iringal	IGL	Vadakara	BDJ	Nadapuram Road	NAU
Mukkali	MUKE	Mahe ^{‡}	MAHE	Jagannath Temple Gate	JGE
Thalassery	TLY	Dharmadam	DMD	Etakkot	ETK
Kannur South	CS	Kannur	CAN	Chirakkal ^{†}	CQL
Valapattanam	VAPM	Pappinisseri	PPNS	Kannapuram	KPQ
Payangadi	PAZ	Ezhimala (halt)	ELM	Payyanur	PAY
Trikarpur	TKQ	Chandera	CDRA	Charvattur	CHV
Nileshwar	NLE	Kanhangad	KZE	Bekal Fort	BFR
Kotikulam	KQK	Kalanad (halt)	KLAD	Kasaragod	KGQ
Kumbala	KMQ	Uppala	UAA	Manjeshwar	MJS
^{†} Station currently disbanded by Railways.
^{‡} Railway station for Mahé, part of Puducherry Union Territory, but geographically located within the state of Kerala.

== Stations on Kayamkulam - Ernakulam Jn. rail-route (via Alappuzha) ==
Railway station	Station code	Railway station	Station code	Railway station	Station code
Cheppad (halt)	CHPD	Harippad	HAD	Karuvatta (halt)	KVTA
Takazhi (halt)	TZH	Ambalapuzha	AMPA	Punnapra (halt)	PNPR
Alappuzha	ALLP	Tumboli (halt)	TMPY	Kalavur (halt)	KAVR
Mararikulam	MAKM	Tiruvizha (halt)	TRVZ	Cherthala	SRTL
Vayalar (halt)	VAY	Turavur	TUVR	Ezhupunna (halt)	EZP
Aroor (halt)	AROR	Kumbalam	KUMM	Tirunettur (halt) ^{†}	TNU
^{†} Station currently disbanded by Railways.

== Stations on Shoranur - Coimbatore rail-route ==
Railway station	Station code	Railway station	Station code	Railway station	Station code
Shoranur Jn.	SRR	Mannanur	MNUR	Ottappalam	OTP
Palappuram ^{†}	PLPM	Lakkiti	LDY	Mankara	MNY
Parli	PLL	Palakkad Jn.	PGT	Kottekad	KTKU
Kanjikode	KJKT	Chullimada^{*}	CLMD	Walayar	WRA
^{*} One-way station on single line, trains pass through this station enroute Coimbatore towards Palakkad only.The opposite line passes through the forest.

== Stations on Palakkad Jn.- Tiruchendur rail-route ==
Railway station	Station code	Railway station	Station code	Railway station	Station code
Palakkad Jn. (Olavakkode)	PGT	Palakkad Town	PGTN	Pudunagaram	PDGM
Vadakannikapuram ^{†}	VDK	Kollengode	KLGD	Muthalamada	MMDA
^{†} Station currently disbanded by Railways.

== Stations on Kollam- Sengottai rail-route ==
Railway station	Station code	Railway station	Station code	Railway station	Station code
Kollam Jn.	QLN	Kilikollur	KLQ	Chandanattop (halt)	CTPE
Kundara	KUV	Kundara East	KFV	Ezhukone	EKN
Kottarakkara	KKZ	Kuri	KIF	Auvaneeswaram	AVS
Punalur	PUU	Edamann	EDN	Ottakkal	OKL
Thenmalai	TML	Kathuruthy (halt)	KTHY	Edapalayam (halt)	EDP
New Aryankavu	AYVN	Aryankavu	AYV		

== Stations on Shoranur - Nilambur Road rail-route ==
Railway station	Station code	Railway station	Station code	Railway station	Station code
Shoranur Jn.	SRR	Vadanamkurishi (halt)	VDKS	Vallapuzha	VPZ
Kulukkallur	KZC	Cherukara	CQA	Angadippuram	AAM
Pattikkad	PKQ	Melattur	MLTR	Tuvvur	TUV
Todiyappulam (halt)	TDPM	Vaniyambalam	VNB	Nilambur Road	NIL

== Stations on Thrissur - Guruvayur rail-route ==
Railway station	Station code	Railway station	Station code	Railway station	Station code
Thrissur	TCR	Punkunnam	PNQ	Guruvayur	GUV

== Non-passenger Freight terminals/ Siding ==
Railway station	Station code	Railway station	Station code	Railway station	Station code
Cochin Harbour Terminus	CHTS	Vallarpadam Container Terminal (Ernakulam Siding)	VPDP	Mattancherry Wharf Siding	CHTS-M
India Gateway Terminal Vallarpadam Siding	IGT	Irumpanam Railway Yard	IPN	BPCL Irumpanam Siding	BPCI
BPCL Kochi Refinery Siding	BKRI	FACT Irumpanam Siding	ERNF	FACT Kalamassery Siding	FCKS
IOC Feroke Siding	ISF	Kerala Newsprint Limited Velloor Siding	PNPS	Malabar Cements Limited Walayar Siding	WACS
KMML Karunagappaally Siding	KMMS	TELK Angamaly Siding	AKFS	Naval Armament Depot Aluva Siding	NADS
FCI Kollam Siding	QLNS	Kollam Goods Shed terminal	QLNG	FCI Mavelikkara Siding	MVKF
FCI Karunagapally Siding	KFCS	FCI Kazhakkoottam Siding	FKZS	FCI Chingavanam Siding	CGVS
FCI Kalamassery Siding	FCIK	FCI Angamaly Siding	AFCS	FCI Mulankunnathukavu Siding	MGKS
FCI Palakkad Jn. Siding	PGTS	Westhill Goods Shed terminal	WHG	FCI Thikkodi Siding	TKFS
FCI Payyannur Siding	PAYS	Old Ernakulam Goods Station	ERG	BPCL Cheppad Siding	BPCC
Cochin Shipyard Siding	ECYS	Ernakulam Marshalling Yard	ERM	KSEB Idukki Hydro Electric Scheme Angamaly Siding	AKIS
HPCL Elathur Siding	HPCE				

== Planned Railway stations ==
Railway station	Station code	Railway station	Station code
Cochin Airport (Nedumbassery)		Vizhinjam Port	

== Defunct/ Unused/ Non-operational railway stations ==
Railway station	Station code	Railway station	Station code	Railway station	Station code
Cochin Harbour Terminus	CHTS	Ernakulam Terminus	ERG	Mattancherry (halt)	MTNC
Kalady		Bharathappuzha (halt)	BPZA	Amala Nagar (halt)	AMLR
Chullimada	CLMD	Kottekad	KTKU	Perashshannur	PEU
Vadakannikapuram	VDK	Kodumunda ^{†}	KODN	Tirunettur	TNU
Tiruvangur	TVF	Cherukunnu	CRKU	Thiruvachira	
Chala	CHAL	Palappuram		Vallikode	VKE
Kudlu	KDLU	Shiriya	SRYA	Beypore	
Puthiyangadi		Vallambram			

== See also ==
Railway lines across Kerala

- Thiruvananthapuram–Nagercoil–Kanyakumari line
- Kollam Junction–Thiruvananthapuram Central line
- Kollam - Sengottai line
- Ernakulam–Kottayam–Kollam line
- Ernakulam–Kayamkulam coastal line
- Shoranur – Ernakulam line
- Guruvayur–Thrissur line
- Shornur - Mangalore line
- Nilambur–Shoranur line
- Jolarpettai–Shoranur line
- Palakkad–Pollachi line

Proposed railway lines (Under construction/ DPR stage)

- Sabari railway
- Nilambur - Nanjangodu

== Gallery ==
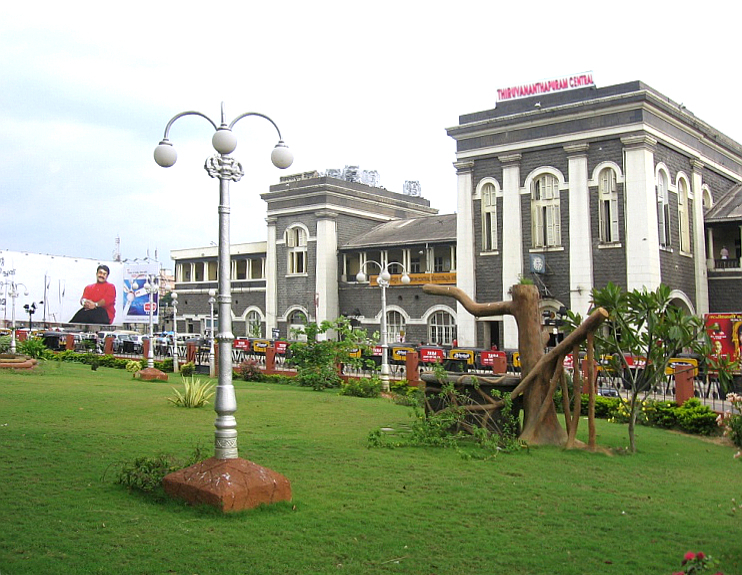
Trivandrum Central

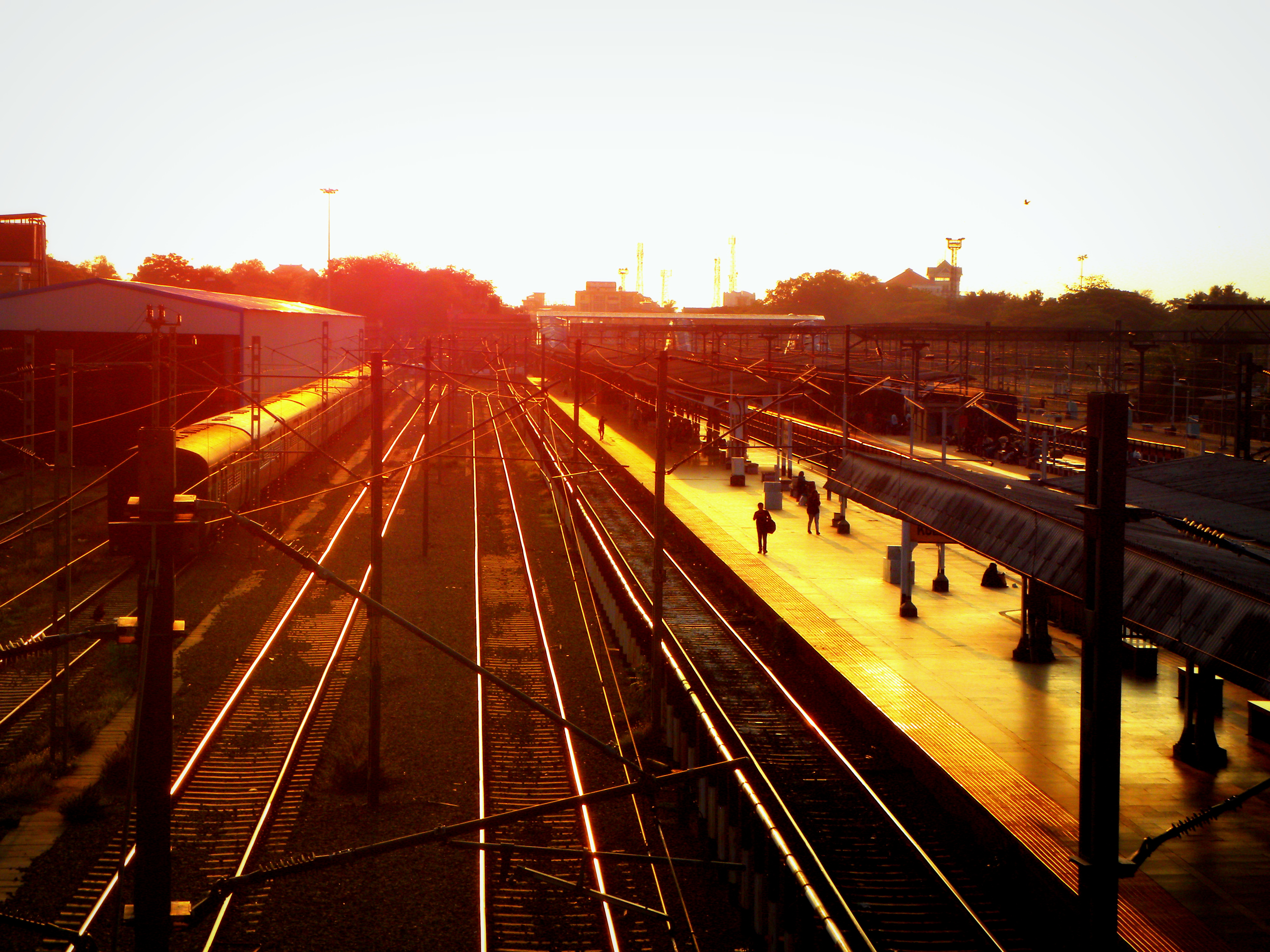
Kollam Junction

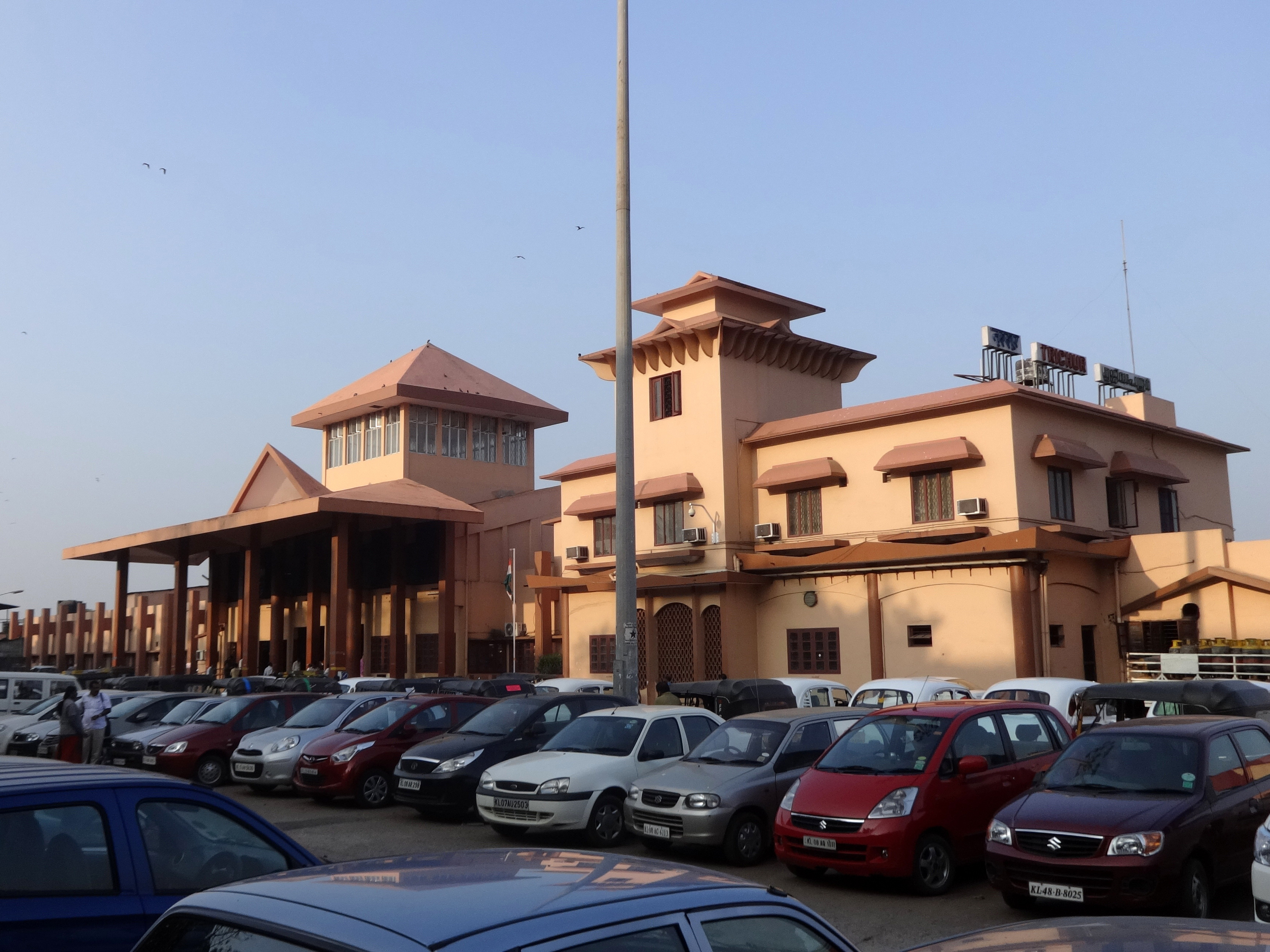
Thrissur railway station

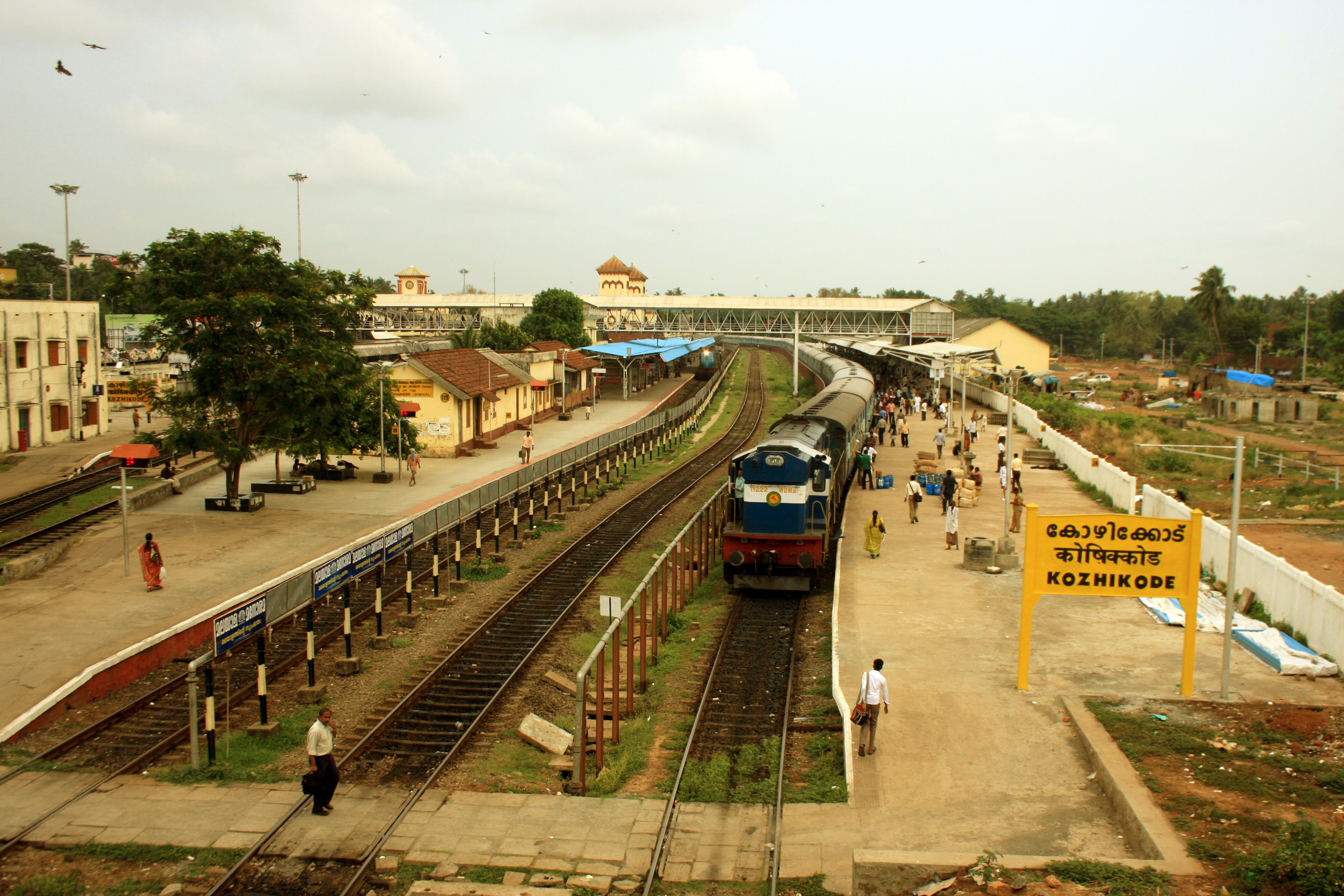
Kozhikode railway station

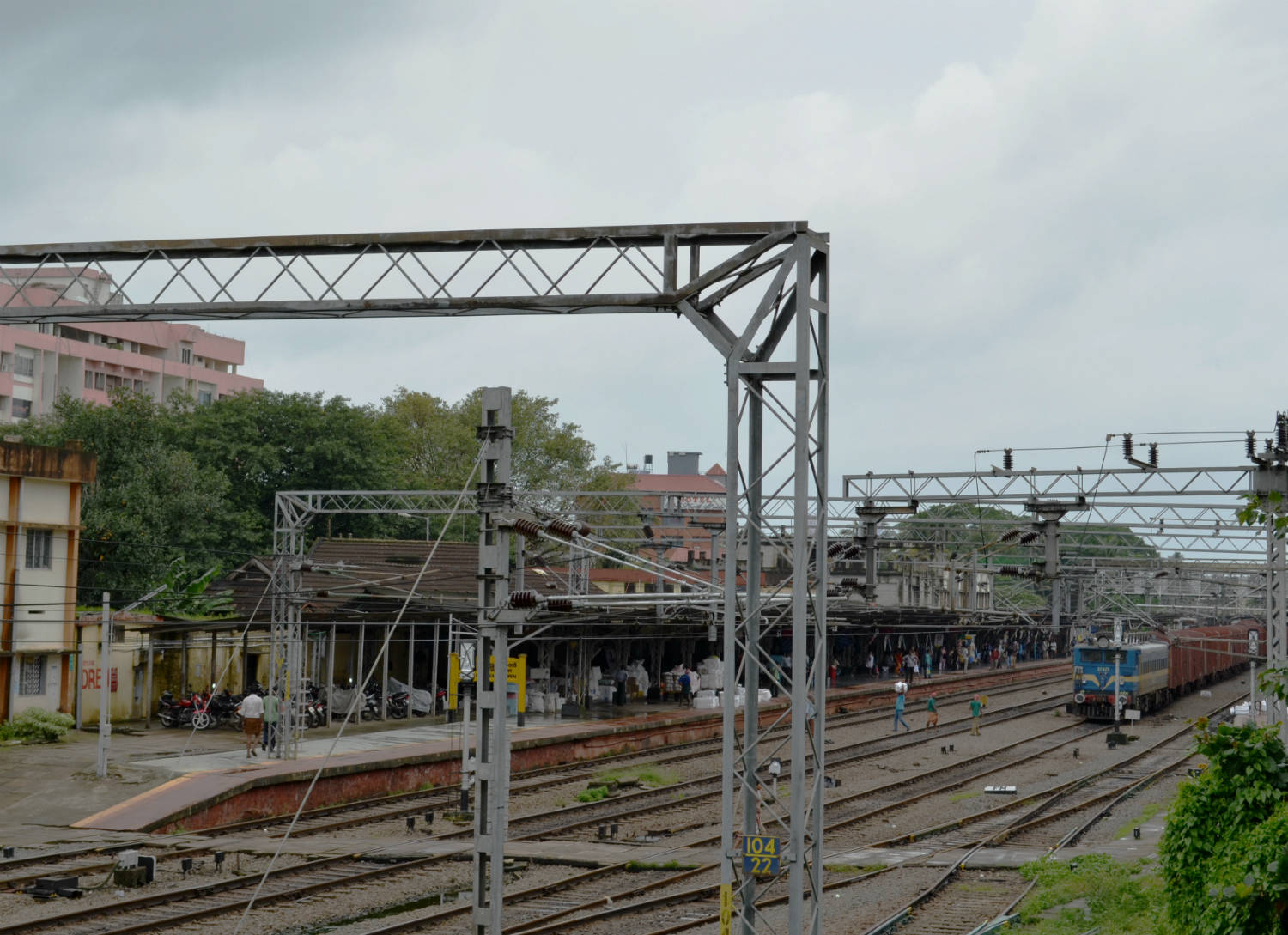
Ernakulam Town (North)
