= EZP =

EZP may refer to:

- EZP, stage name of Edwin Perez, a composer of Cupido
- EZP, station code for the Ezhupunna railway station in Kerala
