= Lakkidi =

Lakkidi may refer to:

- Lakkidi, Wayanad, a village in Kerala, India
- Lakkidi, Palakkad, a village in Kerala, India
  - Lakkidi railway station, Palakkad
