= Puramathra =

- village
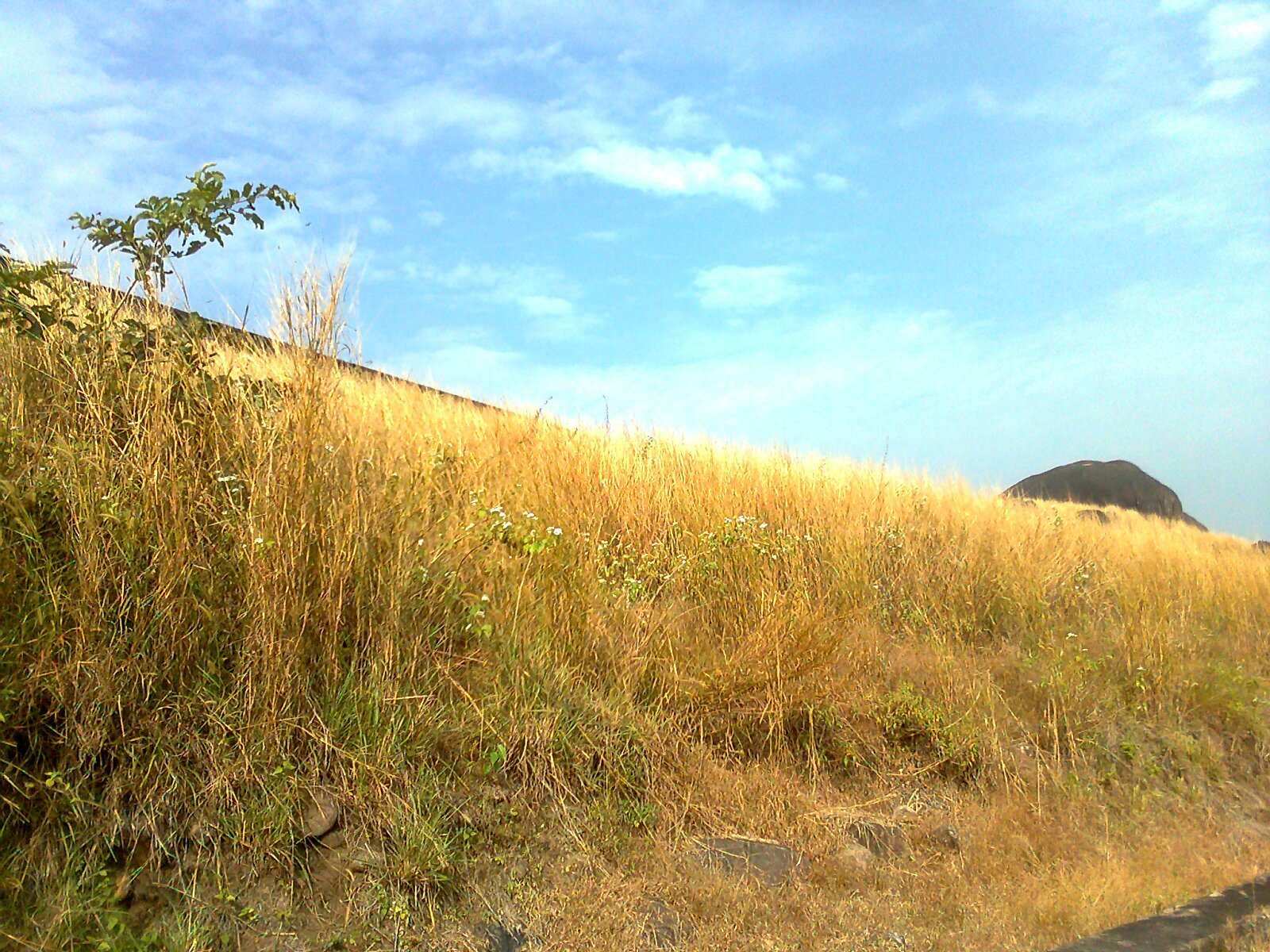
- From Anakkal road, Puramathra
- Interactive map of Puramathra
- Coordinates: 10°46′0″N 76°19′0″E
- Country: India
- State: Kerala
- District: Palakkad

Languages
  - Official: Malayalam, English
- Time zone: UTC+5:30 (IST)
- PIN: 679337
- Telephone code: 0466
- Vehicle registration: KL-
- Nearest city: Cherpulassery

Puramathra is a village in Kulukkallur panchayath in Palakkad district in the state of Kerala, India.

- Transportation-- You may take the bus, taxi or drive through yourself to the village.(Around one to two hours)

== Gallery ==
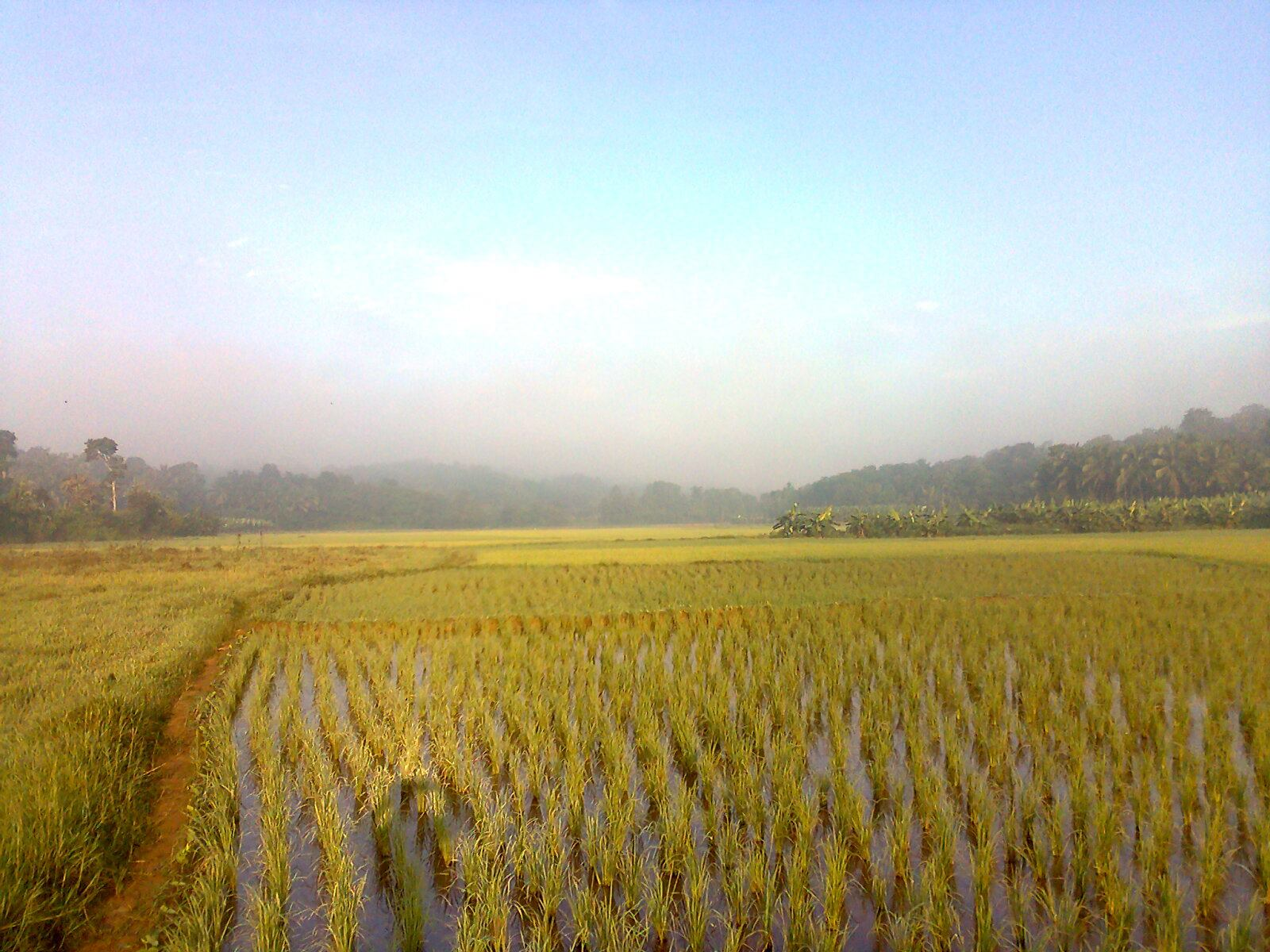
From Puramathra paadam

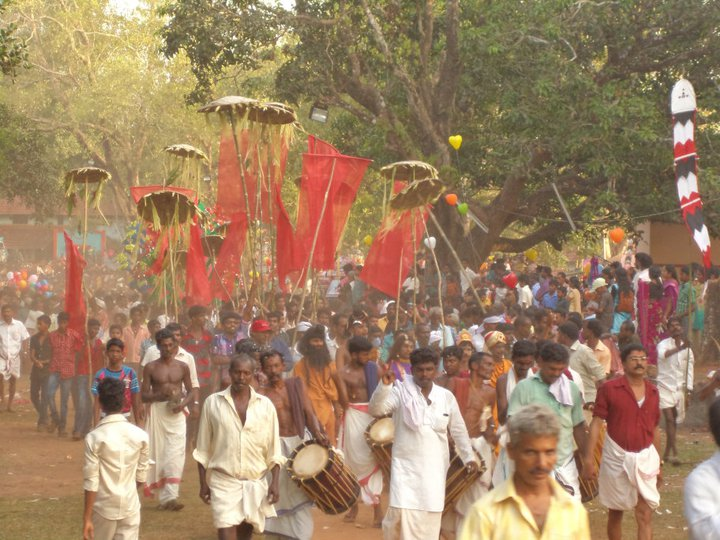
Mulayankavu pooram

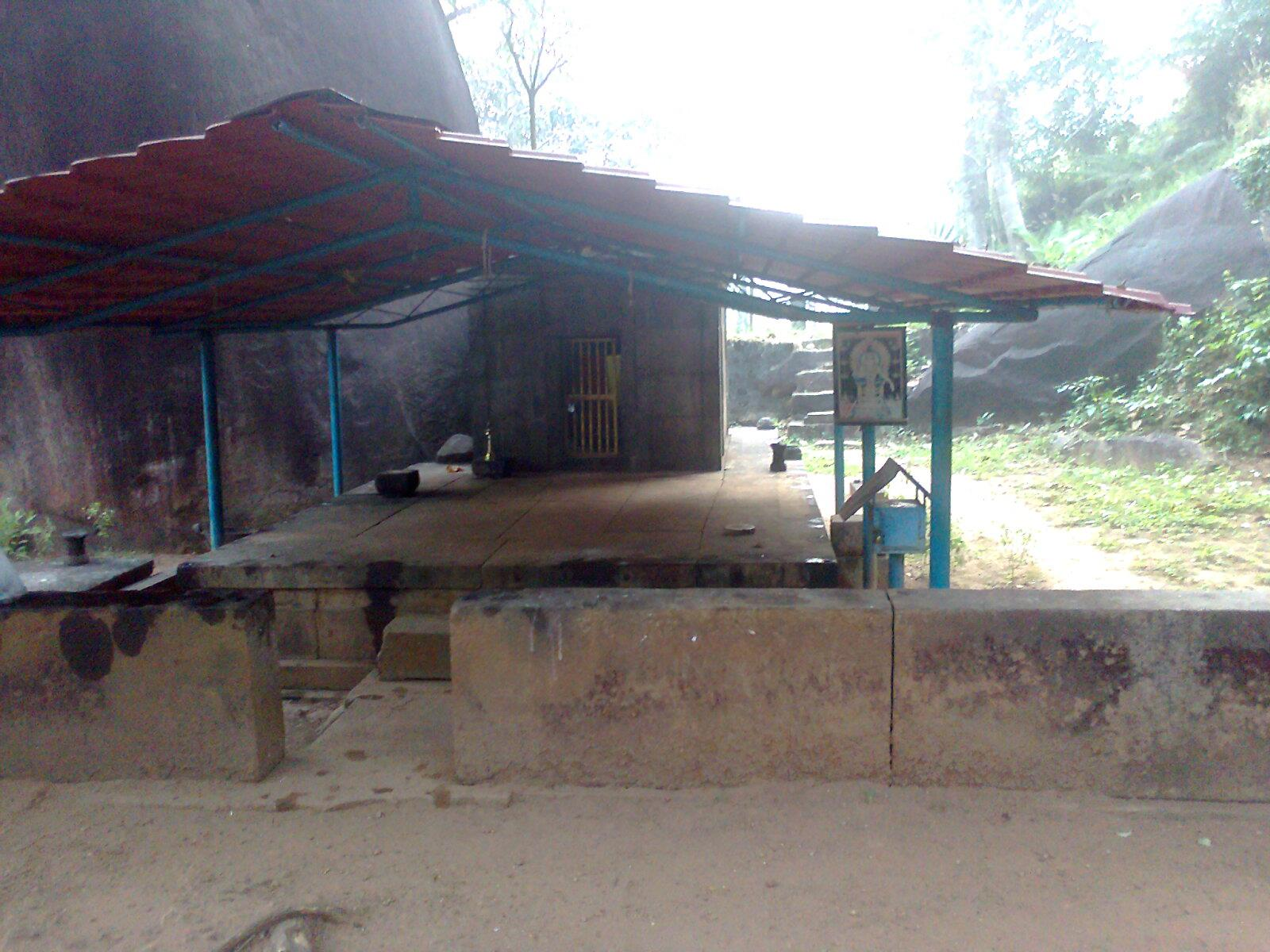
Anakkal Bhagavathi temple, Puramathra

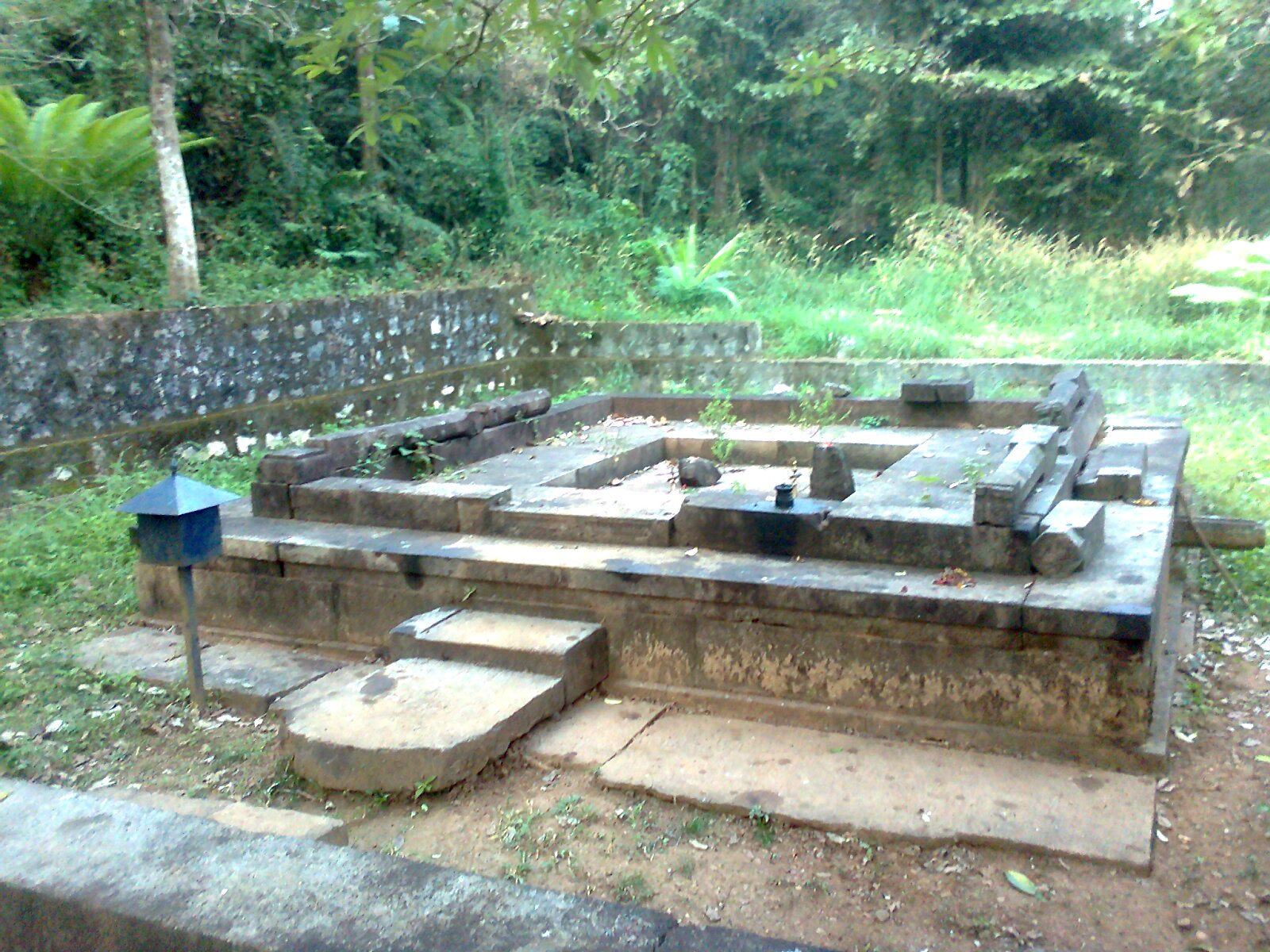
Part of Anakkal Bhagavathi temple, Puramathra
