= Mararikulam railway station =

Railway station in Kerala, India

Mararikulam

General information
- Location: Mararikulam, Alappuzha, Kerala; India
- System: Regional rail, Light rail & Commuter rail station
- Owner: Indian Railways
- Operator: Southern Railway zone
- Line: Kayamkulam-Alappuzha-Ernakulam
- Platforms: 2
- Tracks: 2

Construction
- Structure type: At–grade
- Parking: Available

Other information
- Status: Functioning
- Station code: MAKM
- Zone(s): Southern Railway zone
- Division(s): Thiruvananthapuram
- Fare zone: Indian Railways

History
- Opened: 1989; 37 years ago
Location
- Location within India Location within Kerala

Mararikulam railway station (code: MAKM) is a railway station in Alappuzha district, Kerala that falls under the Thiruvananthapuram railway division of the Southern Railway zone, Indian Railways. The station is a minor station on the Ernakulam–Kayamkulam coastal railway line. It is an NSG 5 category station. The station is operated by the Southern Railway zone of the Indian Railways and comes under the Thiruvananthapuram railway division.

== History ==
Mararikulam railway station falls under the Ernakulam South–Alappuzha coastal railway line which opened on 16 October 1989. The railway line was later extended to Kayamkulam in 1992. The station is also a major point of single-line crossing with trains often taking unscheduled stops at the station. But a few trains have scheduled stops here.

== Layout ==
Mararikulam railway station has 3 rail lines with only 1 having platforms access to handle long-distance and Passenger trains. The station is also a major point of single-line crossing with trains often taking unscheduled stops at the station. One of the siding also act as a refuge siding. The platform has a capacity to accommodate trains with 24 coaches.

== See also ==
- List of railway stations in Kerala
