= QLD (disambiguation) =

QLD is the postal code for Queensland, a state in Australia.

QLD may also refer to:

- Koyilandy railway station, a train station located in Kozhikode District, Kerala, India
- Queens Light Dragoons, an early name for the Governor General's Body Guard in the Canadian Army
