= Nambrathkara =

Nambrathkara Nambrathukara
- Interactive map of Nambrathkara
- Coordinates: 11°28′57″N 75°41′37″E
- Country: India
- State: Kerala
- District: Kozhikode

Languages
  - Official: Malayalam, English
- Time zone: UTC+5:30 (IST)
- PIN: 673634
- Vehicle registration: KL-56
- Nearest city: Kozhikode

Nambrathkara is situated 4 km away from Koyilandy in the Indian state of Kerala.

== Education ==
Nambrathkara village is one of the educational hot spot in this area. Three major educational institutions in this area includes, branch of Sree Sankaracharya University of Sanskrit for higher education, Sree Vasudeva Ashrama Secondary School for secondary education, and Nambrathkara UP school for Upper primary. The rural regional branch of Sree Sankaracharya University of Sanskrit established here in 1994, now offering six different PG programs along with a research wing.

Coordinates: 11°28'57"N 75 °41'37"

== Transportation ==
Nambrathkara village connects to other parts of India through Koyilandy town. The nearest airports are at Kannur and Kozhikode. The Koyilandy railway station is the nearest railway station. The National Highway 66 passes through Koyilandy, the northern stretch connects to Mangalore, Goa and Mumbai. The southern stretch connects to Cochin and Trivandrum. The National Highway 54 going through Kuttiady connects to Mananthavady, Mysore and Bangalore.
