= Vallapuzha railway station =

Railway station in Kerala, India

Vallapuzha

General information
- Coordinates: 10.8306°N 76.2534°E
- Operator: Southern Railway
- Platforms: 1
- Tracks: 1

Other information
- Status: Operational
- Station code: VPZ

History
- Opened: 1921; 105 years ago

Services
Preceding station	Indian Railways	Following station
Vadanamkurishi towards Shoranur Junction	Southern Railway zone Shoranur–Nilambur section	Kulukkallur towards Nilambur Road
Route map
Location
- Location within Kerala Location within India

Vallappuzha railway station is a railway station serving the town of Shoranur in the Palakkad district of Kerala. It lies in the Shoranur–Nilambur section of the Southern Railways. Trains halting at the station connect the town to prominent cities in India such as Nilambur, Shoranur and Angadipuram.

== Nilambur–Shoranur line ==
This station is on a historic branch line, one of the shortest broad-gauge railway lines in India.

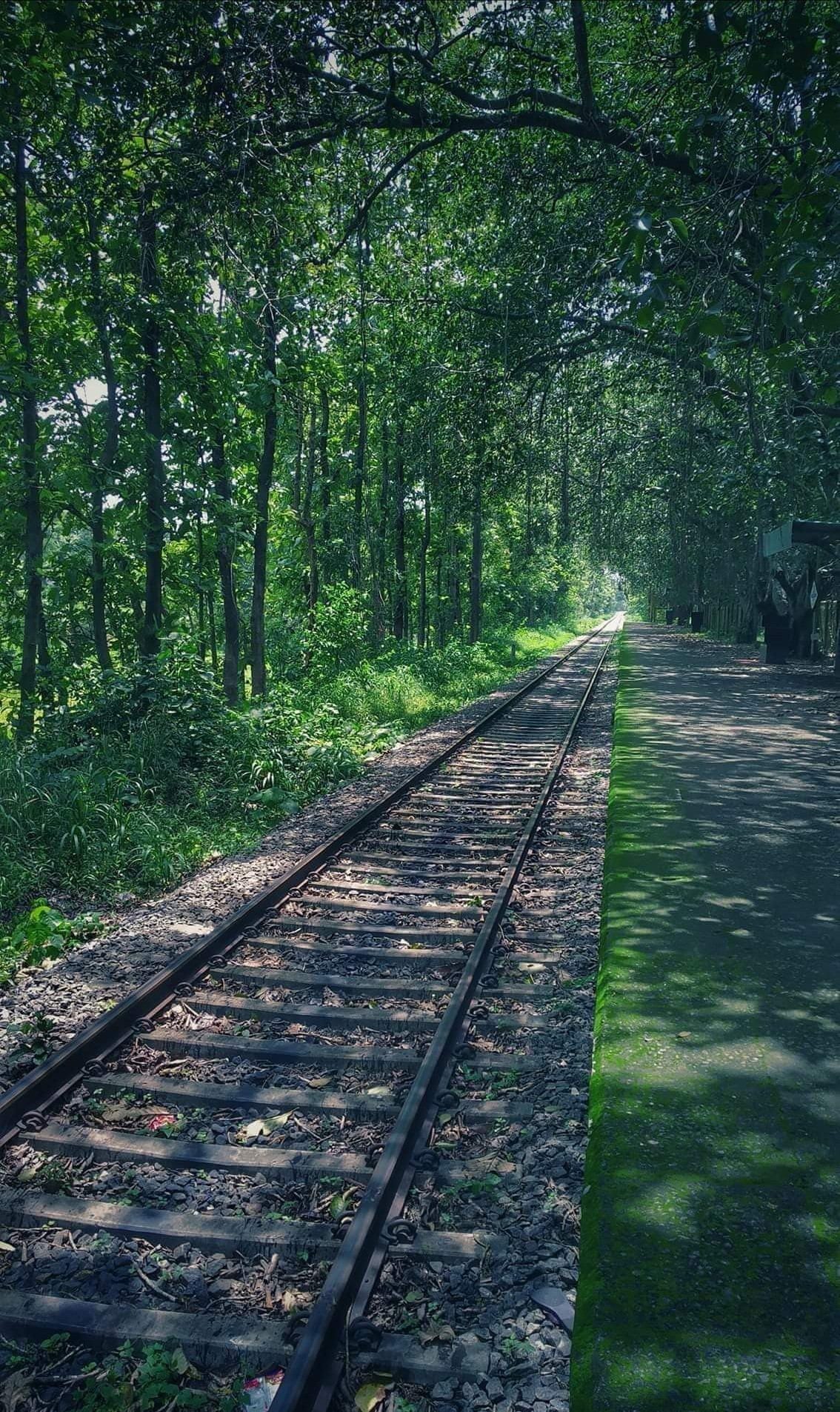
Vallapuzha railway station
