= Kottekad railway station =

Railway station in Kerala, India

Kottekad

General information
- Location: adukkamkunnam – Kunuppulli Road, Palakkad, Kerala; India
- Coordinates: 10.8162°N 76.6933°E
- Elevation: 98 metres (322 ft)
- System: Regional rail, Light rail & Commuter rail station
- Owner: Indian Railways
- Operator: Southern Railway zone
- Line: Jolarpettai–Shoranur line
- Tracks: 2

Construction
- Structure type: At–grade
- Parking: Available

Other information
- Status: Functioning
- Station code: KTKU
- Zone(s): Southern Railway zone
- Division(s): Palakkad
- Fare zone: Indian Railways
Location
- Location within India Location within Kerala

Kottekad railway station (Code: KTKU) is a railway station in Palakkad District, Kerala and falls under the Palakkad railway division of the Southern Railway zone, Indian Railways.
