= Irinjalakuda railway station =

Railway station in Kerala, India

Irinjalakuda

General information
- Location: Irinjalakuda, Kerala, India
- Coordinates: 10.3406°N 76.2809°E
- System: Regional rail, Light rail & Goods railway
- Owner: Indian Railways
- Line: Shoranur–Cochin Harbour section
- Platforms: 2
- Tracks: 3

Construction
- Structure type: Standard on-ground station
- Parking: Available
- Cycle facilities: Available

Other information
- Station code: IJK
- Fare zone: Southern Railway

History
- Opened: June 2, 1902; 124 years ago

Services
Preceding station	Indian Railways	Following station
Nellayi towards Shoranur Junction	Southern Railway zone Shoranur–Cochin Harbour section	Chalakudi towards Cochin Harbour Terminus
Location
- Location within India Location within Kerala

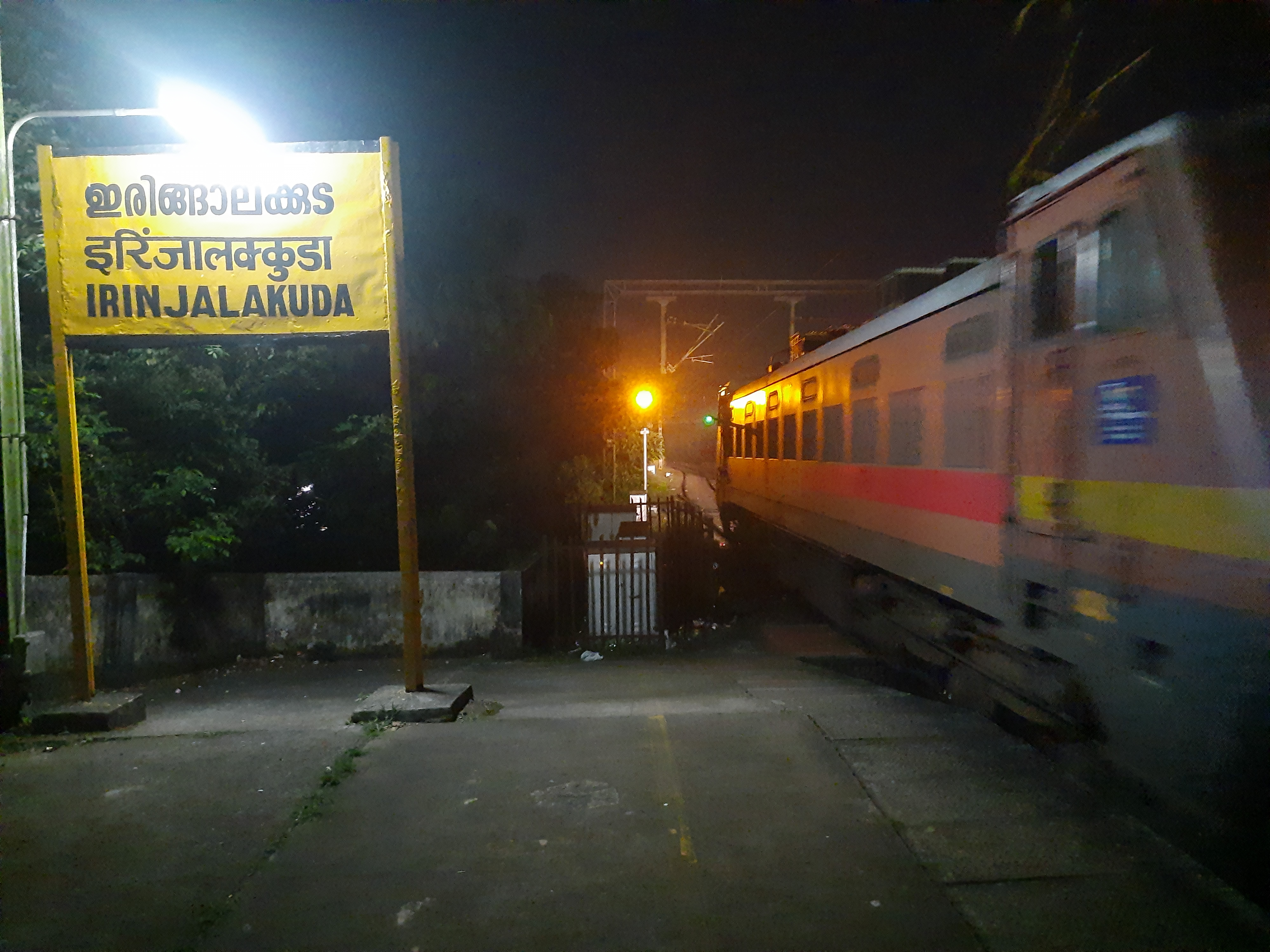
Irinjalakuda railway station

Irinjalakuda railway station (station code: IJK) is an NSG–5 category Indian railway station in Thiruvananthapuram railway division of Southern Railway zone. It is a railway station situated in Kallettumkara village, Kerala, India. Irinjalakuda town is 8 km away from the station.

The station is between Chalakudi and Nellayi on the busy Shoranur–Cochin Harbour section in Thrissur district.

Irinjalakuda railway station is operated by the Chennai-headquartered Southern Railway of the Indian Railways. A total of 22 pairs of trains, including superfast, express and passenger trains, stop at the station.

One of the youngest researcher Geethu Krishna M. G. travelled from this railway station during her higher studies. Her work on sacred groves is a notable work for Kerala.

== See also ==
- List of railway stations in India
