= Nadapuram Road railway station =

Railway station in Kerala, India

Nadapuram Road

General information
- Location: Chorode, Kozhikode, Kerala; India
- Coordinates: 11.63929°N 75.575522°E
- System: Regional rail, Light rail & Commuter rail station
- Owner: Indian Railways
- Operator: Southern Railway zone
- Line: Shoranur–Mangalore line
- Platforms: 2
- Tracks: 2

Construction
- Structure type: At–grade
- Parking: Available

Other information
- Status: Functioning
- Station code: NAU
- Zone(s): Southern Railway zone
- Division(s): Palakkad
- Fare zone: Indian Railways

History
- Opened: 1904; 122 years ago
Location
- Location within India Location within Kerala

Nadapuram Road railway station is a railway station, in the Southern Railways zone, in the Kozhikode district, Kerala. The station code is NAU.

It falls under the Palakkad railway division of the Southern Railway zone, Indian Railways. It has two platforms. Works on the platform have been taken up in 2018 with the MPLAD funds of Rs.50 lakhs.
