= Chandera railway station =

Railway station in Kerala, India

Chandera

General information
- Location: India
- Coordinates: 12.1803°N 75.1677°E
- System: Regional rail and Light rail station

Other information
- Status: Functioning
- Station code
- Zone(s): Southern Railway zone
- Division(s): Palakkad
Route map
- Sources
Location
- Location within India Location within Kerala

Chandera Railway Station is a minor railway station serving the town of Trikaripur in the Kasaragod district of Kerala, India. Only four passenger trains stop here. It lies in the Shoranur–Mangalore section of the Southern Railways. Trains halting at the station connect the town to places like Kozhikode, and Mangalore.
