= Nellayi railway station =

Railway station in Kerala, India

Nellayi

General information
- Location: Nellayi, Thrissur district, Kerala, India
- Coordinates: 10.3920°N 76.2756°E
- System: Indian Railways station
- Owner: Ministry of Railways, Indian Railways
- Line: Shoranur–Cochin Harbour section
- Tracks: 2

Construction
- Structure type: Standard on-ground station
- Parking: Not available
- Cycle facilities: Not available

Other information
- Station code: NYI
- Fare zone: Southern Railway zone

History
- Opened: 2 June 1902; 124 years ago
- Former names: Madras and Southern Mahratta Railway

Services
Preceding station	Indian Railways	Following station
Pudukad towards Shoranur Junction	Southern Railway zone Shoranur–Cochin Harbour section	Irinjalakuda towards Cochin Harbour Terminus
Location
- Location within India Location within Kerala

Nellayi railway station (station code: NYI) falls between the Irinjalakuda railway station and the Pudukad railway station. It lies in the busy Shoranur–Cochin Harbour section of Trivandrum division. Nellayi railway station is operated by the Chennai-headquartered Southern Railways of the Indian Railways.
