= Haripad railway station =

Railway station in Kerala, India

Haripad
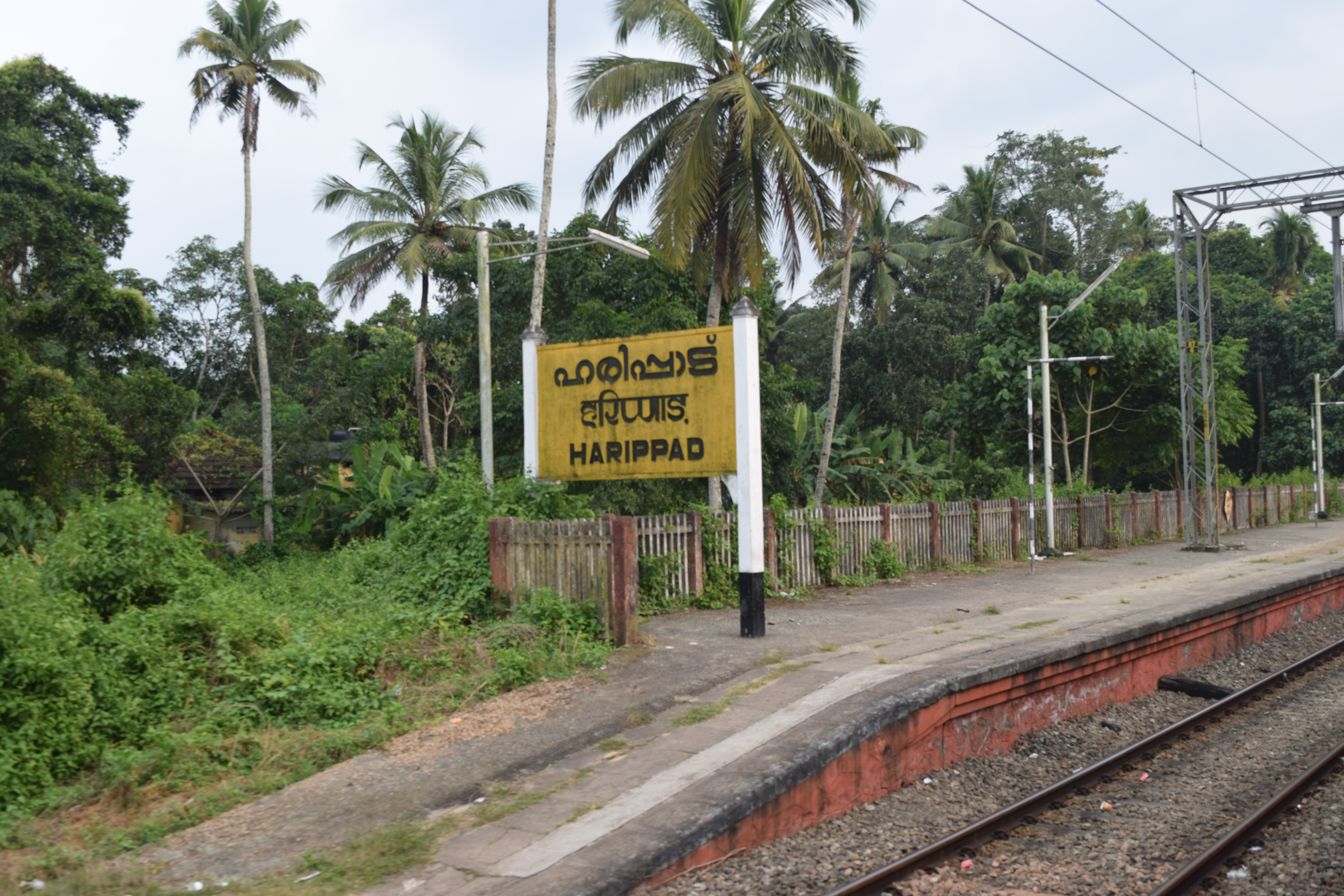

General information
- Location: Haripad, Alappuzha, Kerala; India
- System: Regional rail, Light rail & Commuter rail station
- Owner: Indian Railways
- Operator: Southern Railway zone
- Line: Kayamkulam-Alappuzha-Ernakulam
- Platforms: 2
- Tracks: 4

Construction
- Structure type: At–grade
- Parking: Available

Other information
- Status: Functioning
- Station code: HAD
- Zone(s): Southern Railway zone
- Division(s): Thiruvananthapuram
- Fare zone: Indian Railways

History
- Opened: 1989; 37 years ago
Location

Haripad railway station (station code: HAD) is an NSG–5 category Indian railway station in Thiruvananthapuram railway division of Southern Railway zone. It is a railway station in Alappuzha district, Kerala.
