= Kulukkallur =

- village
- Interactive map of Kulukkallur
- Coordinates: 10°46′0″N 76°19′0″E
- Country: India
- State: Kerala
- District: Palakkad

Population (2011)
  - Total: 27,971

Languages
  - Official: Malayalam, English
- Time zone: UTC+5:30 (IST)
- PIN: 679337
- Vehicle registration: KL-52

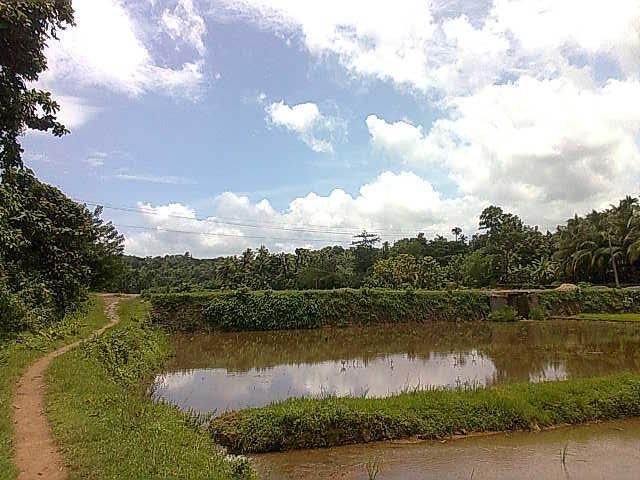
A visual from Kulukkallur

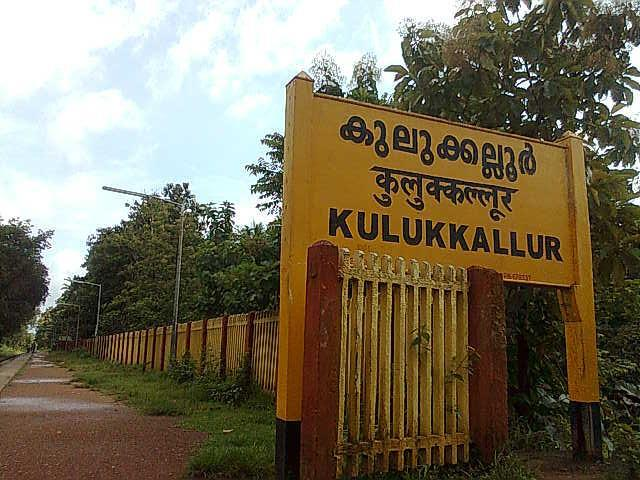
Kulukkallur Railway Station

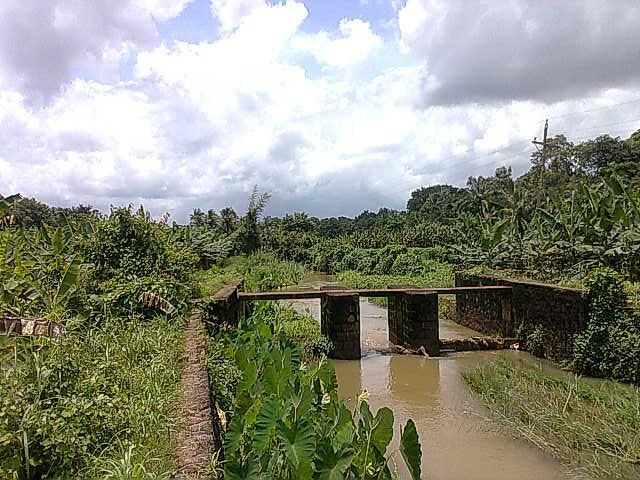
A visual from Kulukkallur

Kulukkallur is a village and gram panchayat in Pattambi Taluk, Palakkad district in the state of Kerala, India.

== Demographics ==
As of 2011 India census, Kulukkallur had a population of 27,971, of which 13,174 are males and 14,797 are females. In Kulukkallur village population of children under six years of age is 3658 which makes up 13.08% of total population of village. Child Sex Ratio for the Kulukkallur as per census is 997, higher than Kerala average of 964. In 10 years since 2001, Population of the village has increased by 8.3%. In 2001 census total population of Kulukkallur village was about 26 thousand.

== Kulukkallur Grama Panchayat LSGI Election -2020 ==
Ward No. Ward Name Elected Members Role Party Reservation

1 CHUNDAMPATTA JASEELA Member IUML Woman

2 NATYAMANGALAM NORTH ISHAQ T.K Vice President CPI(M) General

3 NATYAMANGALAM AMEERUNNEESA Member IUML Woman

4 CHUNDAMPATTA EAST RAJANI. P Member CPI(M) Woman

5 THATHNAMPULLY MISITHA SOORAJ Member INC General

6 THATHNAMPULLY SOUTH KADEEJA M K Member IUML Woman

7 MAPPATUKARA WEST SAHEERA NOUSHAD Member CPI(M) Woman

8 MAPPATUKARA EAST JAMEELA Teacher Member INC Woman

9 PURAMATHRA V. RAMANI President CPI(M) General

10 PURAMATHRA SOUTH ROSHNI S. RAJ Member CPI(M) Woman

11 KULUKKALLUR M.K SREEKUMAR Member CPI(M) General

12 ERAVATHRA KUNJIMUHAMMED Member IUML General

13 MULAYANKAVU SOUTH LEELA.V.P Member IUML SC Woman

14 MULAYANKAVU NORTH BALAGANGADHARAN Member CPI(M) General

15 VANDUMTHARA ASIA P.K Member CPI(M) Woman

16 VALIYAPARAMBU VENUGOPALAN.K Member CPI(M) SC

17 CHUNDAMPATTA WEST N.P SUDHAKARAN Member CPI(M) General

== Kulukkallur Grama Panchayat LSGI Election -2015 ==
Ward No. Ward Name Elected Members Role Party Reservation

1 CHUNDAMPATTA VIRALIKKATTIL NUSAIBA ASHARAF Member CPI(M) Woman

2 NATYAMANGALAM NORTH M K.RASHEEDA GAFOOR Member INC Woman

3 NATYAMANGALAM M. SAIDALAVI MASTER Member IUML General

4 CHUNDAMPATTA EAST MUHAMMED NOORUDHEEN Member INC General

5 THATHNAMPULLY MISITHA SOORAJ Member INDEPENDENT Woman

6 THATHNAMPULLY SOUTH RAJENDRANUNNI Member CPI(M) General

7 MAPPATUKARA WEST RAJAN POOTHANAYIL Member INDEPENDENT General

8 MAPPATUKARA EAST RATHEESH Member INC SC

9 PURAMATHRA V.RAMANI Member CPI(M) Woman

10 PURAMATHRA SOUTH PRASAD CHENDRATHODI Member BJP General

11 KULUKKALLUR RESMI RAJESH Member CPI(M) Woman

12 ERAVATHRA MUMTHAS LAILA KALIMADATHIL Member IUML Woman

13 MULAYANKAVU SOUTH ABDUL KAREEM Member IUML General

14 MULAYANKAVU NORTH SREEJA TEACHER Member CPI(M) SC Woman

15 VANDUMTHARA GOPAKUMAR President INC General

16 VALIYAPARAMBU KADEEJA MECHERIKUNNATH Vice President IUML Woman

17 CHUNDAMPATTA WEST VP.BULKEES YUSUF Member CPI(M) Woman

== Schools in Kulukkallur ==
- Chundampatta GLPS (W)
- Chundampatta South ALPS
- Nattiyamangalam AM LPS
- Kulukkalloor GMLPS
- Kulukkalloor PVALPS
- Kulukkalloor West AMLPS
- Kulukkallur ALPS
- Chundampatta GUPS
- Chundampatta BV UPS
- Kulukkalloor AUPS
- Mulayankavu AUPS

== See also ==
- Kulukkallur railway station
