= Kanjikode railway station =

Railway station in Kerala, India

Kanjikode

General information
- Location: Kanjikode, Palakkad, Kerala; India
- Coordinates: 10.8002°N 76.7547°E
- System: Regional rail, Light rail & Commuter rail station
- Owner: Indian Railways
- Operator: Southern Railway zone
- Line: Jolarpettai–Shoranur line
- Platforms: 2
- Tracks: 4

Construction
- Structure type: At–grade
- Parking: Available

Other information
- Status: Functioning
- Station code: KJKD
- Zone(s): Southern Railway zone
- Division(s): Palakkad
- Fare zone: Indian Railways

History
- Opened: 1904; 122 years ago
Location
- Location within India Location within Kerala

Kanjikode railway station (station code: KJKD) is an NSG–6 category Indian railway station in Palakkad railway division of Southern Railway zone. It is a railway station in the Palakkad district, Kerala and falls under the Palakkad railway division of the Southern Railway zone, Indian Railways.
