= Kulukkallur railway station =

Railway station in Kerala, India

Kulukkallur
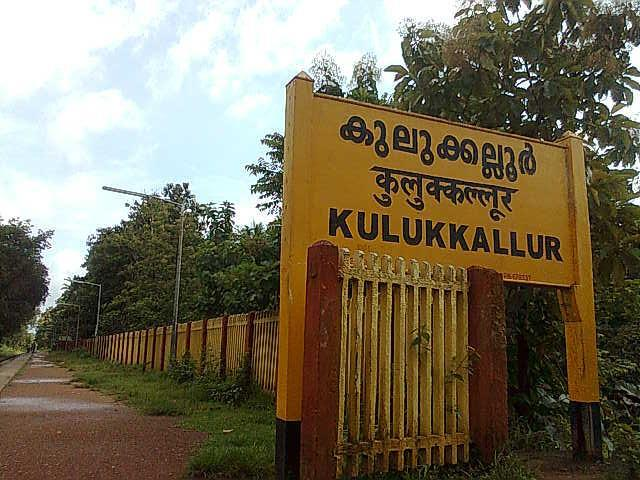
- Railway Signboard

General information
- Location: Palakkad, Kerala; India
- Coordinates: 10.8682°N 76.2390°E
- Operator: Southern Railway
- Line: Nilambur–Shoranur railway line
- Platforms: 1
- Tracks: 1

Other information
- Status: Active
- Station code: KZC

History
- Opened: 1921

Services
Preceding station	Indian Railways	Following station
Vallapuzha towards Shoranur Junction	Southern Railway zone Shoranur–Nilambur section	Cherukara towards Nilambur Road
Route map
Location
- Location within Kerala Location within India

Kulukkallur railway station is a major railway station serving the village of Kulukkallur, near Pattambi in the Palakkad district of Kerala. It lies along the Nilambur–Shoranur railway line branch line of Palakkad division of the Southern Railways. Trains halting at the station connect the town to prominent cities in India such as Nilambur, Shoranur and Angadipuram.

The Station was built as a contractor-operated Halt on 17-02-1958 between Vallapuzha and Cherukara Railway stations.

Construction works are in progress for the second platform so as to upgrade Kulukkallur railway station as a crossing station.
