= Chullimada railway station =

Railway station in Kerala, India

Chullimada

General information
- Location: Chullimada, Palakkad, Kerala; India
- Coordinates: 10.8206°N 76.8040°E
- Elevation: 178 metres (584 ft)
- System: Regional rail, Light rail & Commuter rail station
- Owner: Indian Railways
- Operator: Southern Railway zone
- Line: Jolarpettai–Shoranur line
- Platforms: 2
- Tracks: 2

Construction
- Structure type: At–grade
- Parking: Available

Other information
- Status: Functioning
- Station code: CLMD
- Zone(s): Southern Railway zone
- Division(s): Palakkad
- Fare zone: Indian Railways
Location
- Location within Kerala Location within India

Chullimada railway station (Code:CLMD) is a railway station in Palakkad District, Kerala and falls under the Palakkad railway division of the Southern Railway zone, Indian Railways.
