= Ambalappuzha railway station =

Railway station in Kerala, India

Ambalappuzha

General information
- Location: Ambalappuzha, Alappuzha, Kerala; India
- System: Regional rail, Light rail & Commuter rail station
- Owner: Indian Railways
- Operator: Southern Railway zone
- Line: Kayamkulam-Alappuzha-Ernakulam
- Platforms: 3
- Tracks: 5

Construction
- Structure type: At–grade
- Parking: Available

Other information
- Status: Functioning
- Station code: AMBL
- Zone(s): Southern Railway zone
- Division(s): Thiruvananthapuram
- Fare zone: Indian Railways

History
- Opened: 1989; 37 years ago
Location

Ambalappuzha railway station (station code: AMPA) is an NSG–5 category Indian railway station in Thiruvananthapuram railway division of Southern Railway zone. It is a railway station in Alappuzha District, Kerala and falls under the Thiruvananthapuram railway division of the Southern Railway zone, Indian Railways. The station is a major station on the Ernakulam–Kayamkulam coastal railway line. The station is operated by the Southern Railway zone of the Indian Railways and comes under the Thiruvananthapuram railway division.

== Layout ==
Alappuzha railway station has 3 platforms to handle long distance and passenger trains. Escalators inaugurated at PF#1 of Alappuzha Railway station
