= Palappuram railway station =

Railway station in Kerala, India

Palappuram

General information
- Location: Kayarampara-Meetna Road, Palappuram, Ottapalam, Palakkad district, Kerala; India
- Coordinates: 10.75185°N 76.39804°E
- Elevation: 42 MSL
- System: Indian Railways station
- Owner: Indian Railways
- Operator: Southern Railway zone
- Line: Jolarpettai–Shoranur line
- Platforms: 2

Construction
- Structure type: At–grade
- Parking: Available

Other information
- Status: Functioning
- Station code: PLPM
- Zone(s): Southern Railway zone
- Division(s): Palakkad
- Fare zone: Indian Railways
Location
- Location within India Location within Kerala

Palappuram (Code: PLPM) is a railway station in Palappuram, Ottapalam, Palakkad district, Kerala and falls under the Palakkad railway division of the Southern Railway zone of the Indian Railways.
