= Ernakulam–Kayamkulam coastal line =

Railway line runs along coastal areas of Alappuzha

Ernakulam –Kayamkulam Coastal line

Overview
- Native name: എറണാകുളം -കായംകുളം തീരദേശ തീവണ്ടി പാത
- Status: Operational
- Owner: Indian Railways
- Locale: Kerala
- Termini: Ernakulam Junction; Kayamkulam Junction
- Stations: 20
- Website: www.sr.indianrailways.gov.in

Service
- Type: Regional rail Light rail
- Services: 1
- Operator(s): Southern Railway zone

History
- Opened: 16 October 1989; 36 years ago

Technical
- Line length: 102 km (63 mi)
- Number of tracks: 1
- Track gauge: 1,676 mm (5 ft 6 in)
- Loading gauge: 4,725 mm × 3,660 mm (15 ft 6.0 in × 12 ft 0.1 in) (BG)
- Operating speed: 110 km/h (68 mph)

Ernakulam–Kayamkulam coastal line is a railway line which runs along the coastal areas of Alappuzha, Ernakulam districts in Kerala state of India. The coastal railway line starts as a branch line from Ernakulam Junction railway station towards Alappuzha and joins with the route via Kottayam (Ernakulam–Kottayam–Kayamkulam line) at Kayamkulam Junction. This is the only main track in Kerala yet to be doubled and the single line traffic causes major delays in the route. The coastal line has a total distance of 102 km (63 mi).

== History ==
The genesis of this line traces its origin to the Alappuzha-Kochi Coastal Development Council formed by K.L. Omanappillai in 1962, one of its main agendas was the Ernakulam-Kayamkulam coastal railway line via Alappuzha. To draw public attention to this cause, Mr. Pillai contested five Lok Sabha and Assembly elections using the "train" as his election symbol.

The initial survey for the Ernakulam–Kayamkulam line via Alappuzha was started in 1975. The initial proposed alignment of the railway line from Ernakulam Junction to Alappuzha has been changed after protests from various quarters. This line was mentioned in 1977–78 final budget. The final alignment of the route which was approved was Ernakulam–Konthuruty–Nettor–Kumbalam–Aroor–Cherthala–Alappuzha. The construction of railway line was started on 15 April 1979 and the construction has been divided into two reaches as Ernakulam–Alappuzha reach and Alappuzha–Kayamkulam reach.

=== Ernakulam–Alappuzha section ===
The construction of this coastal railway line in Ernakulam Junction–Alappuzha railway station section was started in 1979. Construction of Alleppey-Ernakulam new B.G. Railway line has been included in the budget for 1979–80, with a proposed outlay, of Rs. 1 crore in the coming financial year 1979–80. Around 140 hectares of land was acquired for laying the railway lines. 11 new railway stations and 6 major bridges have been constructed along this route. The Aroor Bridge is the Longest Bridge in this section having length of 1,849 m (6,066 ft) The total cost outlay was 7 crores and the total length of the railway line is 58 km (36 mi). The line was opened to railway traffic on 16 October 1989.

=== Alappuzha–Kayamkulam section ===
The construction of Alappuzha–Kayamkulam section was started as part of second phase of coastal railway development and the alignment was via Alappuzha–Punnapra–Ambalappuzha–Haripad–Kayamkulam. The total length of the railway line was 44 km (27 mi) and the line was opened to railway traffic on 1992. Thus, the Ernakulam Junction–Alappuzha coastal railway line has been connected to Kayamkulam Junction railway station–Kollam Junction main railway line.

== Stations ==
There are 18 stations along this route. Alappuzha, Cherthala, Haripad, and Ambalappuzha stations are the major stations along this route.

== Electrification and track doubling ==
Ernakulam Junction–Alappuzha–Kayamkulam railway line is fully electrified.

Timeline

- 2012 : The double line work on 14 km (8.7 mi) Kayamkulam Junction–Haripad section has been completed and the double line track was commissioned in January 2012.
- 2019 : Preparatory works for Doubling of the 1,849 m (6,066 ft) long Aroor Bridge was started and later it got hold.
- 2021 : The track doubling work for Haripad– Ambalapuzha was also commissioned. Hence there is a double line from Kayamkulam to Ambalapuzha with a track length of 31 km.

The doubling works for the Ambalapuzha- Ernakulam junction sector is painfully slow. However, as of June 2021, The Railways has sanctioned an additional Rs 510 crore for acquiring land for the doubling of the line from Ernakulam to Thuravoor. This money bas been deposited in the Collectorates of Ernakulam and Alappuzha districts without any further action.

- 2023: No doubling works are initiated in this stretch as of September 2023. Railways decided to complete the Ernakulam Junction - Kumbalam (7.71 km) stretch in the first phase, followed by Kumbalam - Thuravoor (15.59 km) and Thuravoor - Ambalapuzha (50 km) stretches in the second and third phases respectively. Ernakulam - Kumbalam stretch has the most number of bridges. The new estimate is as follows:
  - Ernakulam to Kumbalam : 600.82 crores.
  - Kumbalam to Thuravoor : 825.37 crores.
  - Thuravoor to Ambalapuzha : 1281 crores.
- 2024 :

April: Maximum Speed of the trains in Kayamkulam - Alappuzha - Ernakulam route increased to 110 km/h.
September: Southern Railways has restarted construction of the Aroor-Kumbalam railway bridge. The land acquisition in Ernakulam - Kumbalam stretch completed. The land acquisition in Kumbalam to Thuravoor stretch is in final stage. But Thuravoor to Ambalapuzha stretch did not obtain approval from Indian Railway authorities yet.

- 2025 : Doubling work started in Ernakulam - Kumbalam stretch.

== Rail traffic ==
The Ernakulam–Alappuzha–Kayamkulam coastal line has 20 express trains and 7 passenger trains running along this route.

There is also freight traffic through this line.

== Needed development ==
- A bypass line connecting Cochin Harbour Terminus railway station line with Alappuzha line near Kochu Kadavanthra and Thevara. It will help decongest Ernakulam Junction railway station and help start more south bound trains via Alappuzha. Also CHTS has been reopened to do the same.
- Timely completion of doubling of line and improvement of signalling in a manner such that headway will be minimum. This will help start Kollam - Alappuzha - Kochi suburban trains. This will lead to a circular rail for Kochi.
- Building a connection between Aroor Halt and Kanjiramattom on Ernakulam–Kottayam–Kayamkulam line so that a circular suburban rail network can be developed around Kochi. And decongest Ernakulam yard.
- This line is devoid of any high degree curves and hence is suitable for upgradation of permissible speeds up to 130kmph. Currently the two fastest trains in the state namely Jan Shatabdi Express and Rajdhani Express passes through this line with speeds above 90 kmph at certain reaches.
- Replacement of major level crosses in the section with flyovers. Especially on Haripad - Mavelikkara, Ambalapuzha - Thiruvalla, Cherthala - Arthunkal, Haripad - Edathua roads and at Atlantis Junction of Kochi.
- Development of infrastructure, amenities and last mile connectivity to stations along the line.
- Development of Alappuzha pitline so that the existing pitline can be able to do primary maintenance for trains so that new trains can be operated and the existing originating/terminating trains (such as Alappuzha Chennai Express, Alappuzha Kannur executive express, passenger trains from Alappuzha, etc.) also will be benefited. As of now, only secondary maintenance can be done there due to the lack of Coaching and Wagon Depot.
- The section lacks direct services towards Nilambur–Shoranur line, Kollam–Sengottai Line and Palakkad–Pollachi line.

== See also ==
- Kayamkulam Junction
- Alappuzha railway station
- Ernakulam–Kottayam–Kayamkulam line
- Sabarimala Railway
- Kollam–Sengottai Chord Line
