= Koyilandy railway station =

Railway station in Kerala, India

Koyilandy Railway Station Quilandi Railway Station
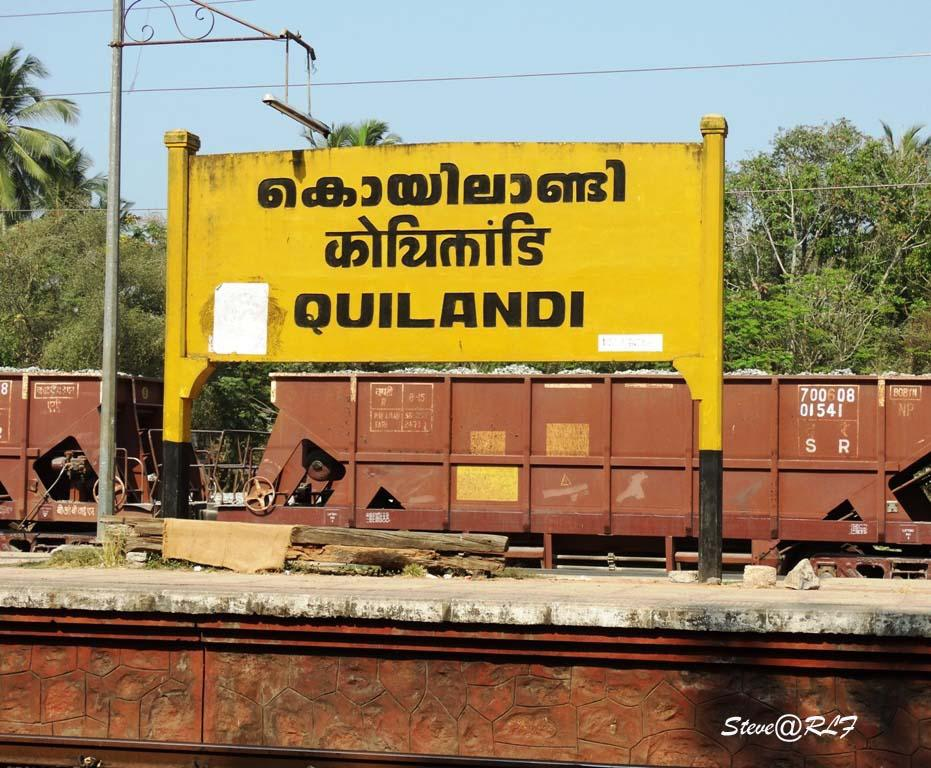
- Koyilandy Station

General information
- Location: Koyilandy, Kozhikode, Kerala; India
- Coordinates: 11.4459°N 75.6937°E
- Elevation: 17 m (56 ft)
- System: Indian Railways station
- Owner: Indian Railways
- Operator: Southern Railway zone
- Line: Shoranur–Mangalore section
- Platforms: 3
- Tracks: 4
- Connections: Bus stand, Taxicab stand, Auto rickshaw stand

Construction
- Structure type: At–grade
- Parking: Available
- Accessible: Disabled access

Other information
- Status: Functioning
- Station code: QLD
- Zone(s): Southern Railway zone
- Division(s): Palakkad

History
- Opened: 1904; 122 years ago
Location
- Location within India Location within Kerala

Koyilandy railway station (also known as Quilandy railway station)(station code: QLD) is an NSG–3 category Indian railway station in Palakkad railway division of Southern Railway zone. It is a railway station in Kozhikode District, Kerala and falls under the Palakkad railway division of the Southern Railway zone, Indian Railways. The station has three platforms, four tracks and four ticket counters including one special counter for disabled citizens. The first station platform has resting areas and a passenger waiting room in the new building.

== Facilities ==
- Reservation counters are open between 6:00 am to 8:00 pm
- IRCTC shops
- State Bank of India ATM center
- Parking Space
- Autorikshaw stand

== See also ==
- List of railway stations in Kerala
- Kozhikode railway station

== Gallery ==
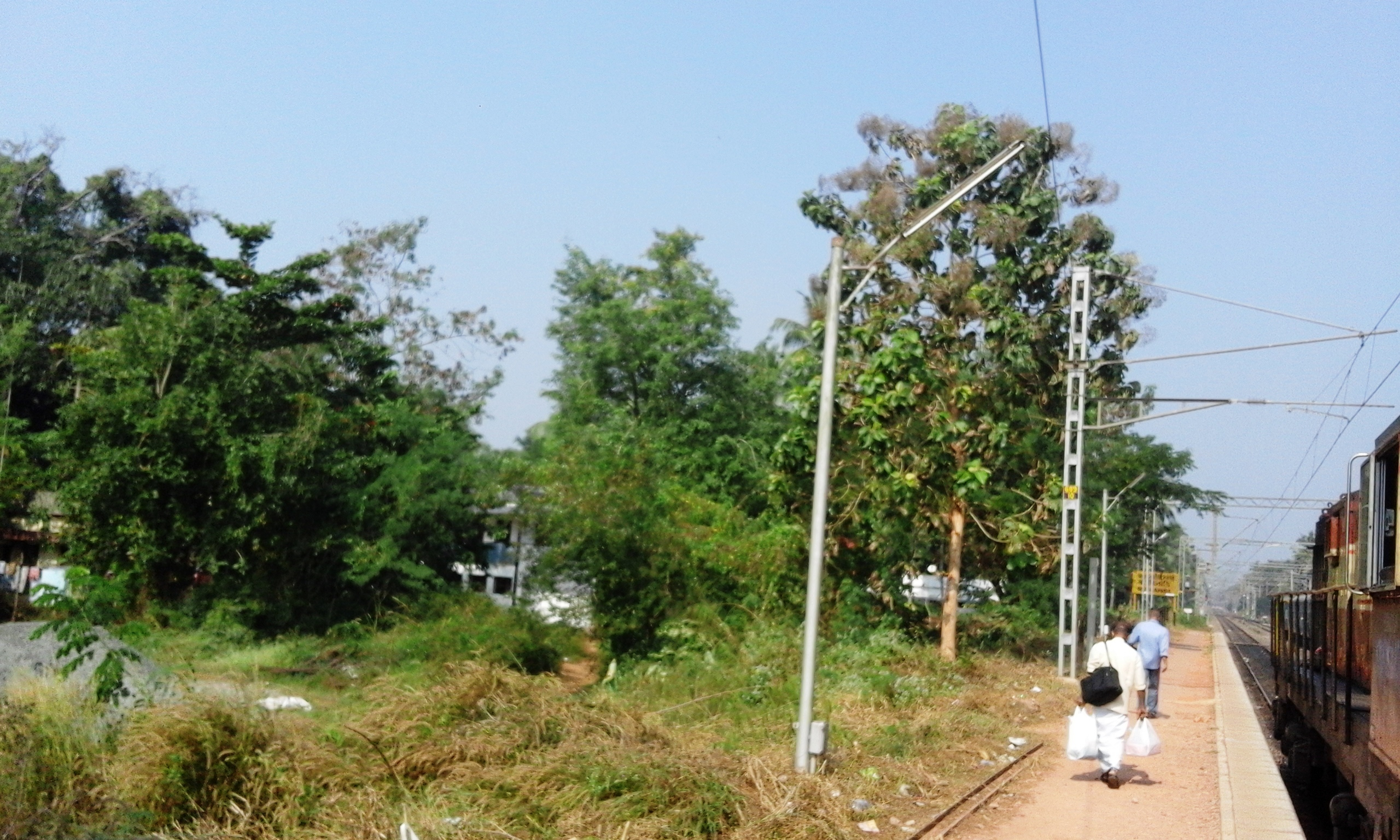
