= Vadanamkurishi railway station =

Railway station in Kerala, India

Nilambur–Shoranur railway line
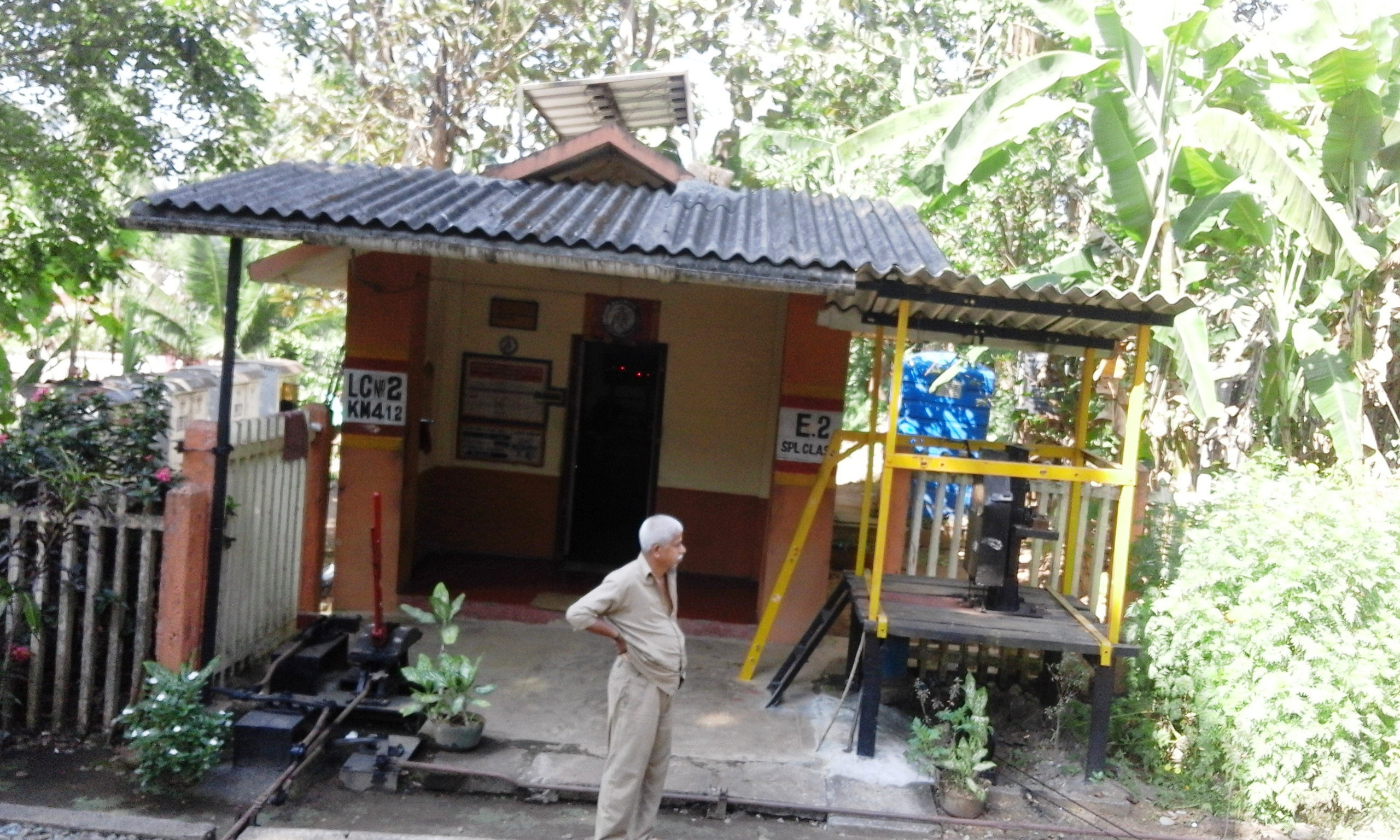
- Vadanamkurishi gate

Overview
- Status: Operational
- Owner: Indian Railways
- Locale: Malappuram, Palakkad
- Coordinates: 10.7878°N 76.2528°E
- Termini: Nilambur Road (NIL); Shoranur Junction (SRR)
- Stations: 11

Service
- Type: Light rail
- System: Southern Railway
- Services: 7
- Operator(s): Southern Railway

History
- Opened: 1921; 104 years ago

Technical
- Line length: 66 kilometres (41 mi)
- Track gauge: 1,676 mm (5 ft 6 in)
- Operating speed: 65 kilometres per hour (40 mph)

Vadanamkurishi railway station is a major railway station serving the town of Shoranur in the Palakkad district of Kerala. It lies in the Shoranur–Mangalore section of the Southern Railways. Trains halting at the station connect the town to prominent cities in India such as Nilambur, Shoranur and Angadipuram.

== Shoranur–Nilambur railway line ==
The Nilambur–Shoranur line is a branch line of the Southern Railway zone in Kerala state and one of the shortest broad-gauge railway lines in India. It is a single line with 66 kilometres (41 mi) length running from Shoranur Junction (in Palakkad district) to Nilambur railway station (in Malappuram district). This station is 4 km from the town of Nilambur on the Kozhikode–Ooty highway. Shoranur–Nilambur Road passenger trains are running on this route. It is 40 kilometres (25 mi) away from Malappuram town.
