= Chirayinkeezhu Assembly constituency =

Constituency of the Kerala legislative assembly in India

Chirayinkeezhu
- Constituency No. 129 for the Kerala Legislative Assembly
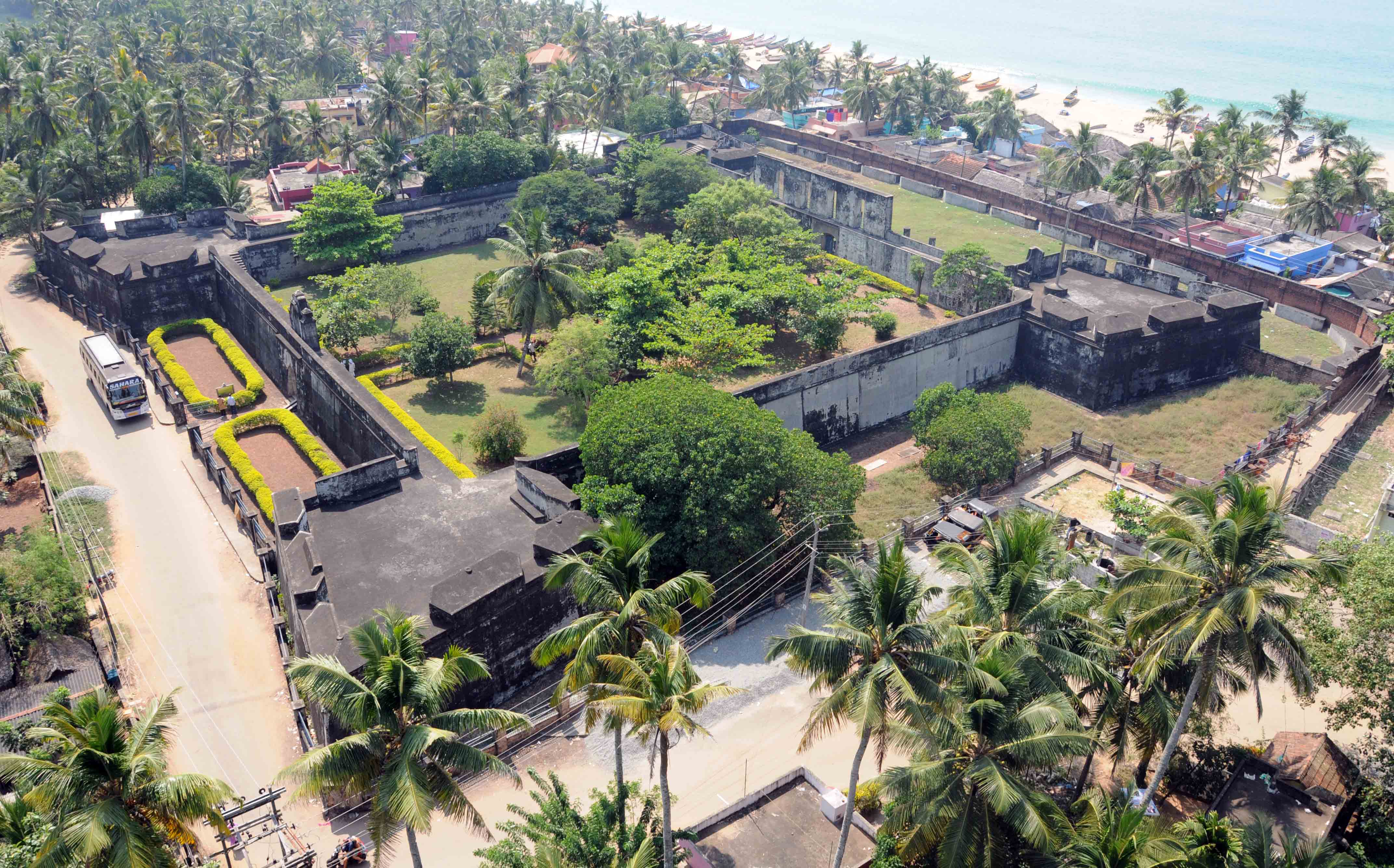
- Anchuthengu Fort

Constituency details
- Country: India
- Region: South India
- State: Kerala
- District: Thiruvananthapuram
- Lok Sabha constituency: Attingal
- Established: 2011
- Total electors: 1,99,220 (2021)
- Reservation: SC

Member of Legislative Assembly
- 16th Kerala Legislative Assembly
- Incumbent Ramya Haridas
- Party: Indian National Congress
- Alliance: UDF
- Elected year: 2026

Chirayinkeezhu State assembly constituency is one of the 140 state legislative assembly constituencies in Kerala in southern India. It is also one of the seven state legislative assembly constituencies included in Attingal Lok Sabha constituency. As of the 2026 assembly elections, the current MLA is Ramya Haridas of INC.

== Local self-governed segments ==
Chirayinkeezhu Assembly constituency is composed of the following local self-governed segments:

Name	Status (Grama panchayat/Municipality)	Taluk
Anchuthengu	Grama panchayat	Chirayinkeezhu
Azhoor	Grama panchayat	Chirayinkeezhu
Chirayinkeezhu	Grama panchayat	Chirayinkeezhu
Kadakkavoor	Grama panchayat	Chirayinkeezhu
Kizhuvilam	Grama panchayat	Chirayinkeezhu
Mudakkal	Grama panchayat	Chirayinkeezhu
Kadinamkulam	Grama panchayat	Thiruvananthapuram
Mangalapuram	Grama panchayat	Thiruvananthapuram

== Members of the Legislative Assembly ==
Election	Member	Party
2011	V. Sasi	Communist Party of India
2016	V. Sasi	Communist Party of India
2021	V. Sasi	Communist Party of India
2026	Ramya Haridas	Indian National Congress

== Election results ==
Percentage change (±%) denotes the change in the number of votes from the immediate previous election.

=== 2026 ===
There were 1,95,562 registered voters in Chirayinkeezhu assembly constituency for the 2026 legislative assembly election.

2026 Kerala Legislative Assembly election: Chirayinkeezhu
Party	Candidate	Votes	%	±%
INC	Ramya Haridas	56,833	38.51	▲5.0
CPI	Manoj B. Edamana	55,411	37.55	▼5.62
BJP	B. S. Anoop	32,920	22.31	▲0.95
NOTA	None of the above	1,042	0.71	▲0.19
BSP	R.Sasi	743	0.50	▼0.26
DHRMP	Anoop Alappuramkunnu	617	0.42	−
Margin of victory		1,422	0.96	▼8.70
Turnout		1,47,566	75.36	▲2.54
INC gain from CPI		Swing	-	

=== 2021 ===
There were 1,99,220 registered voters in Chirayinkeezhu Assembly constituency for the 2021 Kerala Assembly election.

2021 Kerala Legislative Assembly election: Chirayinkeezhu
Party	Candidate	Votes	%	±%
CPI	V. Sasi	62,634	43.17	▼3.58
INC	B. S. Anoop	48,617	33.51	▼2.79
BJP	G. S. Ashanath	30,986	21.36	▲7.24
BSP	Anil Mangalapuram	1,097	0.76	
NOTA	None of the above	758	0.52	
WPOI	G. Anilkumar	616	0.42	▼0.27
Independent	Anoop Gangan	372	0.26	
Margin of victory		14,017	9.66	▼0.69
Turnout		1,45,080	72.82	▲2.60
CPI hold		Swing	▼3.58	

=== 2016 ===
There were 1,97,079 registered voters in the constituency for the 2016 Kerala Assembly election.

2016 Kerala Legislative Assembly election: Chirayinkeezhu
Party	Candidate	Votes	%	±%
CPI	V. Sasi	64,692	46.75	▼6.18
INC	K. S. Ajith Kumar	50,370	36.30	▼5.77
BJP	P. P. Vava	19,478	14.08	
NOTA	None of the above	1,092	0.79	
WPOI	Sasi Panthalam	955	0.69	
Independent	Santhini	639	0.46	
PDP	Ambili V.	589	0.43	
Independent	Ajith Nandancode	226	0.15	
Independent	Shibu	206	0.15	
Independent	Ajith	133	0.10	
Margin of victory		14,322	10.35	▼0.51
Turnout		1,38,380	70.22	▲3.98
CPI hold		Swing	▼6.18	

=== 2011 ===
There were 1,69,988 registered voters in the constituency for the 2011 election.

2011 Kerala Legislative Assembly election: Chirayinkeezhu
Party	Candidate	Votes	%	±%
CPI	V. Sasi	59,601	52.93	
INC	K. Vidyadharan	47,376	42.07	
Independent	Aythiyoor Surendran	2,078	1.85	
BSP	Anil Mangalapuram	1,414	1.26	
Independent	Sajimon Chelayam	1,277	1.13	
LJP	Anilkumar B.	857	0.76	
Margin of victory		12,225	10.86	
Turnout		1,12,603	66.24	
CPI win (new seat)				

== See also ==
- Chirayinkeezhu
- Thiruvananthapuram district
- List of constituencies of the Kerala Legislative Assembly
- 2016 Kerala Legislative Assembly election
