= Chirayinkeezhu taluk =

- Taluk
- Location in Kerala, India
- Coordinates: 8.70°N 76.82°E
- Country: India
- State: Kerala
- District: Thiruvananthapuram
- Established: 1955
- Named for: Chirayinkeezhu
- Headquarters: Attingal

Government
  - Body: Gram panchayat Municipality

Area
  - Total: 215.61 km^{2} (83.25 sq mi)
  - Rank: 5th

Population (2011)
  - Total: 339,785
  - Rank: 4th
  - Density: 1,575.9/km^{2} (4,081.6/sq mi)

Languages
  - Official: Malayalam, English
- Time zone: UTC+5:30 (IST)
- Telephone code: 0470
- Vehicle registration: KL-16

Chirayinkeezhu Taluk is a taluk in the district of Thiruvananthapuram in the Indian state of Kerala. It shares a land border with Varkala Taluk to the North and Thiruvananthapuram Taluk to the South. It comprises 12 panchayats as well as Attingal Municipality. Chirayinkeezhu taluk is the birthplace of several distinguished personalities, including the renowned painter Raja Ravi Varma, poet and social reformer Kumaran Asan, and the actor Prem Nazir.

== Settlements ==
There are 16 villages and one municipality in the taluk.

=== Villages ===
Alamcode, Azhoor, Chirayinkeezhu, Edakkode, Kadakkavoor, Keezhattingal, Kilimanoor, Ponganadu, Koonthalloor, Koduvazhannoor, Mudakkal, Nagaroor, Pazhayakunnummel, Perunguzhi, Pulimath, Sarkara-Chirayinkeezhu, Vakkom, Vellalloor

=== Municipalities ===
Municipality of Attingal is the only one in the taluk

== Places of tourist interest ==
Chirayinkeezh has a network of backwaters and canals, which is quite typical of Kerala. Also there are many Temples and important tourist places. Some of them are given below.

=== Kilimanoor Palace ===
The estate of Kilimanoor originally belonged to a Pillai ruling chief and was forfeited to Travancore by Maharaja Marthanda Varma. The estate comprising several villages was then handed over to the family of the father of the King who had come south from Parappanad in Malabar around 1718.

In 1705 (ME 880) the son and two daughters of Ittammar Raja of Beypore Thattarikovilakam, a Kolathunadu royal house, were adopted into the Royal house of Venad. Ittammar Raja's sister and her sons, Rama Varma and Raghava Varma, settled in Kilimanoor and married the now adopted sisters. Marthanda Varma, the founder of the Kingdom of Travancore, was the son of Raghava Varma. The nephew Sister's son. According to the matrilineal system prevalent at that time children born of the female members only belonged to that house of Raghava Varma, Ravi varma Koil Thampuran, married the sister of Marthanda Varma. Their son became known as Dharma Raja Kartika Thirunnal Rama Varma.

In 1740 when an allied force, the forces were from Kochi, Thekkumkoor, Deshinganad (present kollam) and Purakkad who had enmity towards Marthanda Varma led by Dutchman Captain Hockert supporting the Deshinganadu King, attacked Venad, an army from Kilimanoor resisted and then defeated them. Although a small victory, this was the first time an Indian army had defeated a European power. In 1753, in recognition of this feat, Marthanda Varma exempted the areas controlled by the Kilimanoor palace. Most of the area under the present Kilimanoor and Pazhayakunnummel panchayats. from taxes, and granted them autonomous status. Although under his kingdom. The present palace complex was built at this time, together with the Ayyappa temple. The original temple being at Nerumkaithakotta, near Kozhikode for the family deity, Sastha or Ayyapan.

Velu Thampi Dalawa held meetings at Kilimanoor palace while planning uprisings against the British. He handed over his sword at the palace before going into his final battle against the British, and India's first President, Dr Rajendra Prasad received this sword from the palace and it was kept in the National Museum in Delhi. Afterwards the sword was moved to the Napier Museum, Trivandrum.

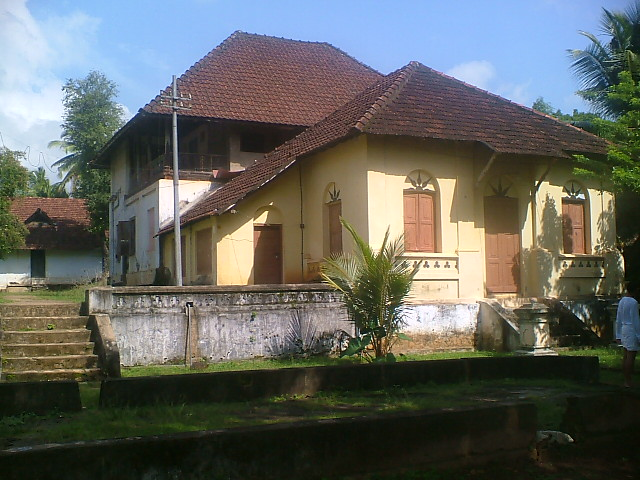
Birthplace of Raja Ravi Varma with his studio in the foreground

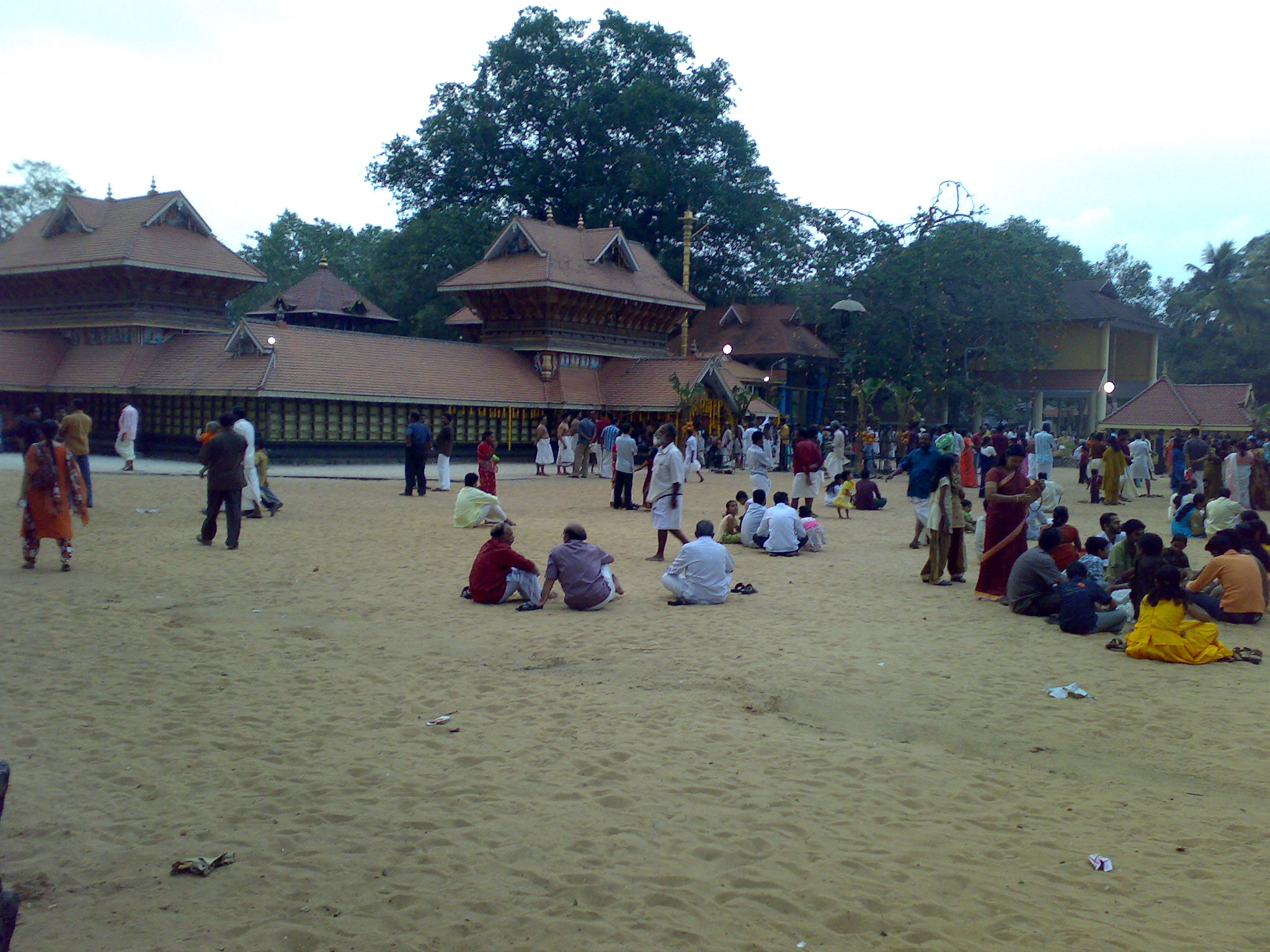
Sarkara devi temple
