= Thiruvananthapuram metropolitan area =

Thiruvananthapuram Metropolitan Area TMA
- Metropolitan area in Thiruvananthapuram
- Location in Kerala, India
- Coordinates: 8.4874°N 76.952°E
- Country: India
- State: Kerala
- District: Thiruvananthapuram

Government
  - Body: Thiruvananthapuram Corporation

Area
  - Total: 542.5 km^{2} (209.5 sq mi)

Population (2011)
  - Total: 1,687,406
  - Density: 3,110/km^{2} (8,056/sq mi)

Languages
  - Official: Malayalam, English
- Time zone: UTC+5:30 (IST)
- Vehicle registration: KL 01, KL 16, KL 19, KL 20, KL 21, KL 22, KL 74, KL 81 KL 15(KSRTC)
- Nearest city: Thiruvananthapuram
- Sex ratio: 1070 ♂/♀
- Lok Sabha constituency: Thiruvananthapuram, Attingal
- Planning agency: Thiruvananthapuram Development Authority (TRIDA)
- Civic agency: Thiruvananthapuram Corporation

Thiruvananthapuram Metropolitan Area is the area consisting of Thiruvananthapuram Corporation and the municipalities of Attingal, Nedumangad and Neyyattinkara, 3 "outgrowths" and 24 census towns. The total population is 1,687,406, which includes 815,200 males and 872,206 females as per 2011 census, making it the second most populous metropolitan area in Kerala after Kochi metropolitan area.

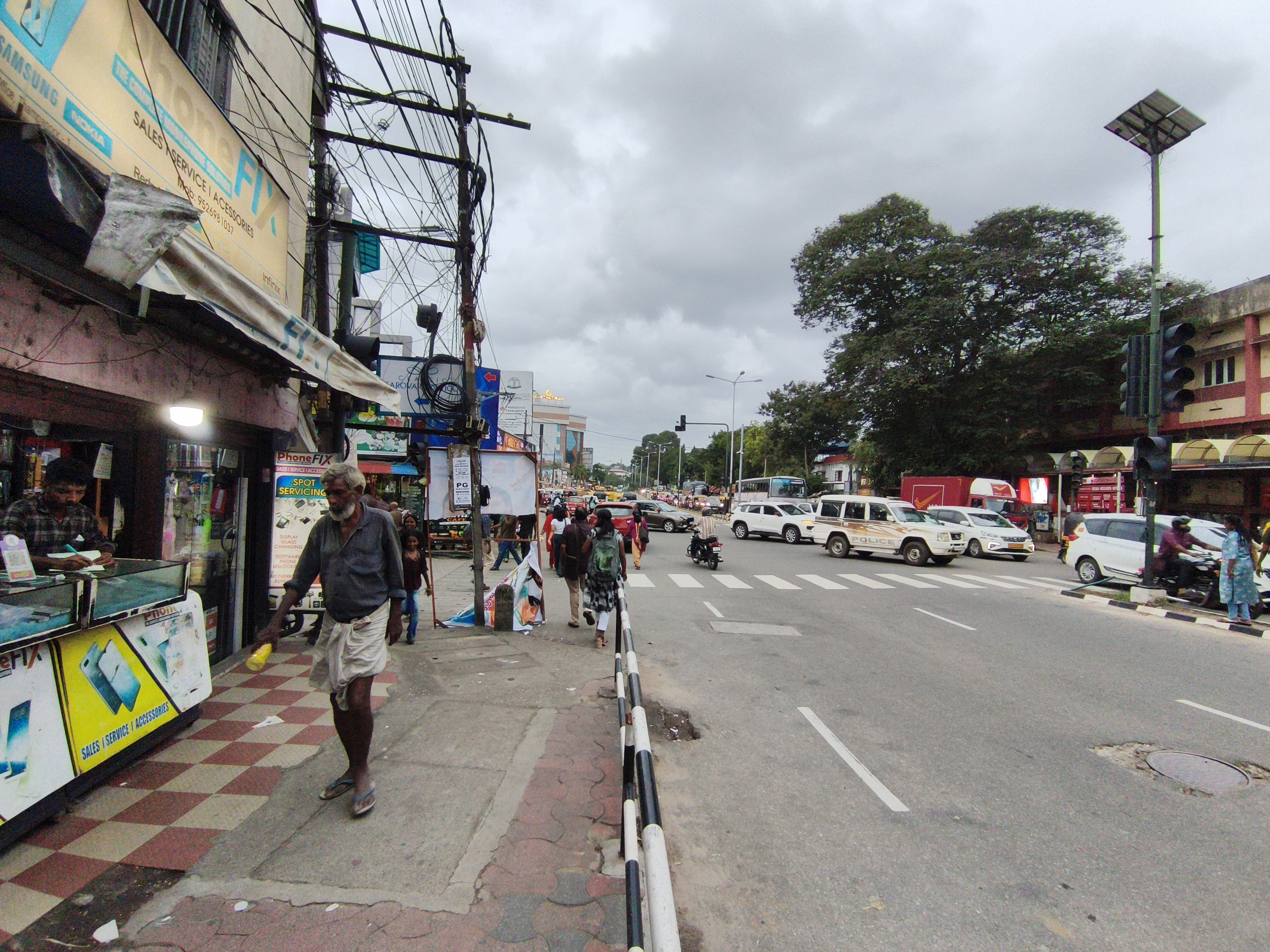
Thampanoor, part of Thiruvananthapuram metropolitan area

== Components ==
No.	Location	Type
1	Thiruvananthapuram	Municipal corporation
2	Attingal	Municipality
3	Neyyattinkara	Municipality
4	Nedumangad	Municipality
5	Chirayinkeezh	Census Town
6	Venganoor	Census Town
7	Kalliyoor	Census Town
8	Menamkulam	Census Town
9	Kadinamkulam	Census Town
10	Andoorkonam	Census Town
11	Pallippuram	Census Town
12	Iroopara	Census Town
13	Veiloor	Census Town
14	Azhoor	Census Town
15	Kizhuvalam - Koonthalloor	Census Town
16	Edakkode	Census Town
17	Vakkom	Census Town
18	Keezhattingal	Census Town
19	Alamcode	Census Town
20	Karakulam	Census Town
21	Vattappara	Census Town
22	Vilappil	Census Town
23	Kulathummal	Census Town
24	Vilavoorkkal	Census Town
25	Pallichal	Census Town
26	Malayinkeezhu	Census Town
27	Balaramapuram	Census Town
28	Athiyannur	Census Town
29	Kadakkavoor	Census Town
30	Kanjiramkulam	Census Town

Thiruvananthapuram Urban Agglomeration population
Year	Pop.	±%
1971	400,000	—
1981	500,000	+25.0%
1991	800,000	+60.0%
2001	889,191	+11.1%
Source: Census of India

== Thiruvananthapuram Capital Region ==
The Thiruvananthapuram Capital Region or TCR is the area proposed by TRIDA (Thiruvananthapuram Development Authority) by joining adjacent municipalities of Attingal, Varkala, Neyyattinkara and Nedumangad with Thiruvananthapuram city. This was proposed for planning the development of the capital region of Kerala more effectively. The TCR covers most part of the Thiruvananthapuram UA and eyes to develop the surrounding municipalities as satellite towns to the main city.

== Thiruvananthapuram metropolitan area redefined by KMRL ==
According to the Comprehensive Mobility Plan submitted by the Kochi Metro Rail Limited for the Trivandrum Metro Rail, the Thiruvananthapuram Metropolitan Area has been officially redefined, with its population fixed at 26 lakhs. The area encompasses the Trivandrum Corporation, three municipalities, and 51 urbanized panchayats, covering a total area of 1,194 square kilometers.

== Links ==
- Infosite, researchgate.net. Accessed 30 August 2024.
