= Anjengo =

Anjengo was an 18th and 19th century British name for:

- Anchuthengu and its associated British East India Company fort and residence.
- Anjengo (1802 ship), a ship launched at Anjengo.
