= Thangassery Enclave =

British enclave in India

Tangasseri Enclave, historically referred to by British administrators as Dutch Quilon, was a tiny British enclave located on the Malabar Coast within the modern-day city of Kollam, Kerala. Spanning an area of just 99 acres (under 0.4 square kilometers), this pocket of land was entirely surrounded by the princely state of Travancore on its landward borders and by the Arabian Sea to its west.

For nearly 150 years, Tangasseri operated under a distinct legal, political, and economic framework from its surrounding geography, functioning as a vital maritime outpost and a unique cultural pocket of British India.

Following the collapse of Dutch influence on the subcontinent, the British East India Company officially assumed control of the territory on October 20, 1795. Rather than integrating the coastal settlement into the expanding princely state of Travancore, the British retained direct sovereignty over Tangasseri. Administratively, the enclave was designated as a part of the Anjengo District (and later the Malabar District) of the Madras Presidency. People from the foreign powers often married locally, and thus Thangassery also became the home of the Anglo-Indian community. It still remains so, but little is left of the population of the Anglo-Indian community.

Tangasseri Arch functioned as a customs check-post and border gateway. Because Tangasseri was a direct part of the Malabar District under the Madras Presidency, it operated under different legal, trade, and tax structures than neighboring Travancore. The archway was specifically erected to regulate and tax trade goods passing into the British enclave and control the influx of people entering the settlement.
