= Geography of Thiruvananthapuram =

The Indian city of Thiruvananthapuram is located in Thiruvananthapuram district in the state of Kerala. The city is located at 8.5°N 76.9°E on the west coast, near the southern tip of mainland India. The city situated on the west coast of India, and is bounded by Arabian Sea to its west and the Western Ghats to its east. The city and the suburbs spans an area of 250 km^{2} (96.53 sq mi). The average elevation of the city is 16 ft above sea level. The highest point within the city limits is the observatory. (60 metres (197 ft)) Agastya Mala, which has an elevation of 1,868 metres (6,129 ft) is only about 60 km from the city. The Ponmudi hill station which has an elevation of 1,100 metres (3,609 ft) is also near the city.

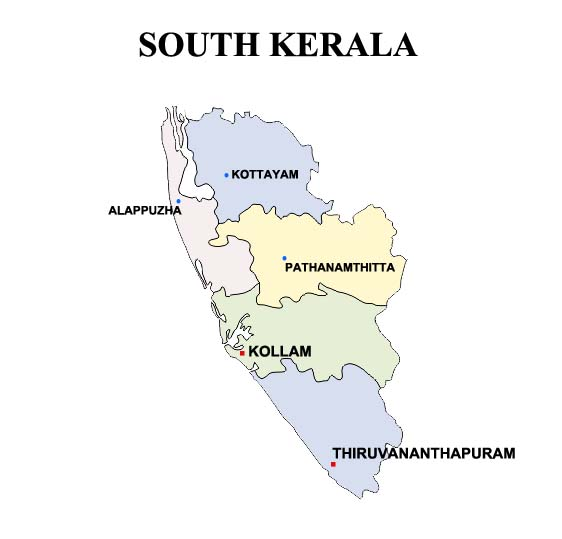
Map of South Kerala

== Geography ==
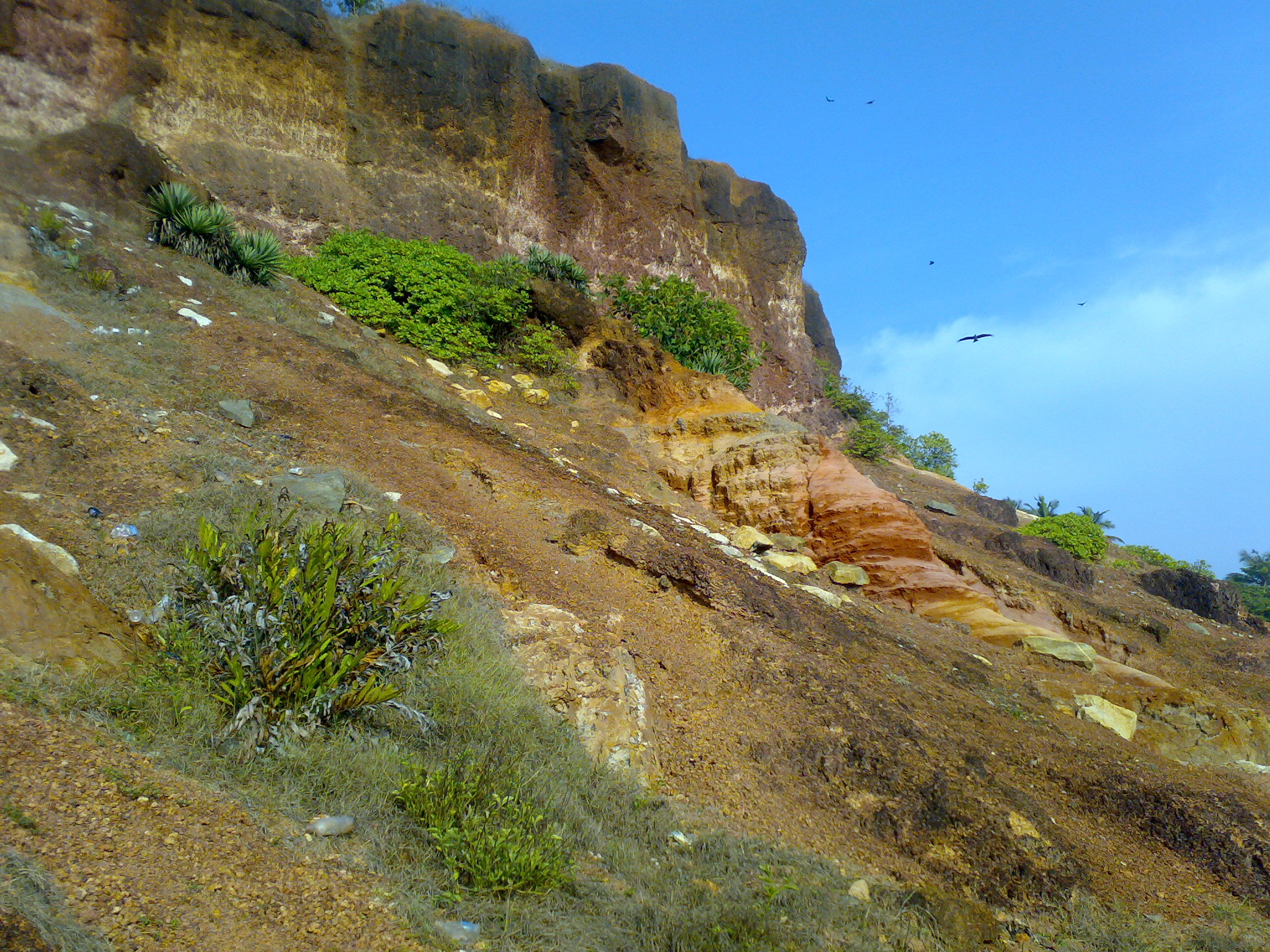
Cliffs at Varkala, Thiruvananthapuram district. It is the only place in southern Kerala where cliffs are found adjacent to the Arabian Sea

The district is situated between North latitudes at 8.17°–8.54° and East longitudes 76.41°–77.17°. The southernmost extremity, Parassala, is just 54 kilometres (34 mi) away from the southern peninsular tip of India, Cape Comorin (Kanya Kumari). The district stretches 78 kilometres (48 mi) along the shores of the Arabian Sea on the west, Kollam district lies on the north with Tirunelveli and Kanyakumari districts of Tamil Nadu on the east and south respectively.

Unlike the flat portion of the Kerala coast, at the northern coastal region cliffs are found adjacent to the Arabian Sea at Varkala. These tertiary sedimentary formation cliffs are considered as a unique geological feature. It is known among geologists as the "Varkala Formation" and a geological monument as declared by the Geological Survey of India.

The district can be divided into three geographical regions: Highlands, Midlands, and Lowlands. The Varkala, Chirayinkeezhu and Thiruvananthapuram taluks are in the midland and lowland regions, the Nedumangad taluk lies in the midland and highland regions, and the Neyyattinkara taluk stretches over all three.

The highland regions on the east and the northeast comprises the Western Ghats. This area is ideal for major cash crops like rubber, tea, cardamom and other spices. Timber trees like teak and rosewood are grown in this region. The Ghats maintain an average elevation of 814 metres (2,671 ft). The part Agasthyarkoodam, which is the second-highest peak in the Western Ghats (1,869 m or 6,132 ft above sea level), lies in the district. The forests in the tail end of Western Ghats form the most diverse and unknown ecosystem in Peninsular India.

The midland region lying between the Western Ghats and lowlands is made up of small and tiny hills and valleys. This is an area of intense agricultural activities. This region is rich in produce such as paddy, tapioca, rubber, eucalyptus, spices and cashews. The lowlands are comparatively narrow, consisting of rivers, deltas and seashore. This area is densely covered with coconut trees. Water bodies cover about 55.25 km^{2} (21.3 sq mi), while forest area is estimated to be 498.61 km^{2} (193 sq mi).

=== Forests ===
Thiruvananthapuram district has a reserve forest area of 495.1 km^{2} (191 sq mi) and vested forest area of 3.534 km^{2} (1.4 sq mi). The forests are spread over three ranges: the Kulathupuzha range in the north, Palode range in the middle, and the Paruthipalli range in the south.

These forests may be broadly classified into three categories: Southern tropical wet evergreen forests, Southern tropical and semi-evergreen forests, and Southern tropical moist deciduous forests. Social forestry programmes are being implemented under the World Bank-aided Kerala Social Forestry Project, National Rural Employment Programme (NREP) and Rural Fuel Wood Schemes to assist small and marginal farmers.

=== Rivers ===
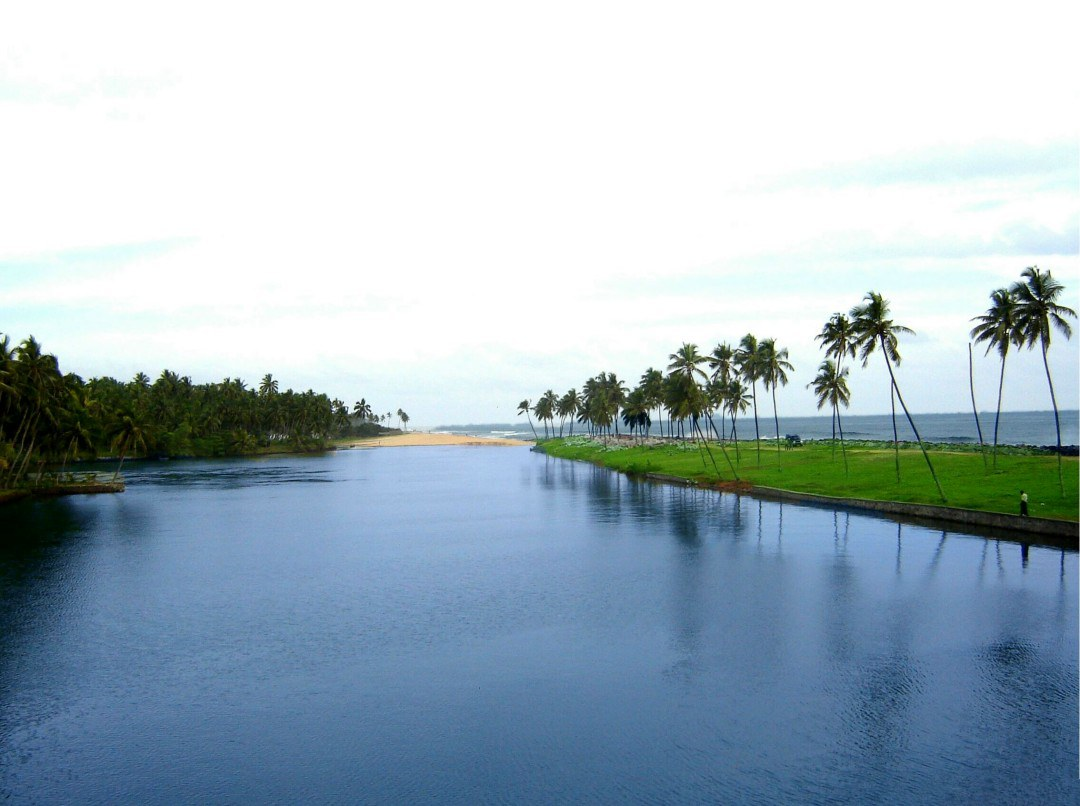
Edava-Nadayara lake Near Thekkumbhagam-Kappil

Among the three rivers in the district, the Neyyar (56 km or 35 mi), the southernmost river of the Kerala state, has its origin in the Agasthyamala, the second-highest peak in the Western Ghats. The Karamana river (67 km or 42 mi) originates from Vayuvanthol (Vazhuvanthol), another mountain in Western Ghats. The Vamanapuram River has its origin from Chemunji Mottai of the Western Ghats. There are 10 major back waters in the district. The major lakes are Veli, Kadinamkulam, Anchuthengu (Anjengo), Kaappil, Akathumuri and the Edava-Nadayara. Besides these, there is a fresh-water lake at Vellayani in Thiruvananthapuram taluk, which has the potential to become the major water source of Thiruvananthapuram city in future.

=== Climate ===
The climate of Thiruvananthapuram district is generally hot tropical. The large forest reserves favourably affect the climate and induce rains. Cold weather is experienced in the mountain ranges, whereas lower down, the weather is bracing and is generally hot in the coastal regions. The mean maximum temperature is 95 °F (35 °C) and the mean minimum temperature is 69 °F (20 °C). As the district stretches from north to south with the Arabian Sea in the west side, the relative humidity is generally high. It rises up to about 95% during the South-West monsoon.

The total annual average rainfall in the district is about 1,500 mm (59 in) per annum. The southwest monsoon, from June to September is the principal rainy season. The district receives most of its annual rainfall in this season. The second rainy season is the Northeast monsoon. It is from October to November.

The district also gets thunderstorm rains in the pre-monsoon months of April and May.

December to February are the coolest months. The average temperature goes down to 69 °F (20 °C) in these months. It is generally considered as the winter season. The summer season starts in February and continues until May. The average temperature goes up to 95 °F (35 °C) in these months.

Climate data for Thiruvananthapuram
Month	Jan	Feb	Mar	Apr	May	Jun	Jul	Aug	Sep	Oct	Nov	Dec	Year
Record high °C (°F)	37 (99)	38 (100)	38 (100)	38 (100)	38 (100)	39 (102)	38 (100)	38 (100)	33 (91)	38 (100)	37 (99)	36 (97)	39 (102)
Mean daily maximum °C (°F)	31.5 (88.7)	31.9 (89.4)	32.6 (90.7)	32.6 (90.7)	31.6 (88.9)	29.7 (85.5)	29.2 (84.6)	29.4 (84.9)	30.0 (86.0)	29.9 (85.8)	30.3 (86.5)	31.0 (87.8)	30.8 (87.4)
Mean daily minimum °C (°F)	22.2 (72.0)	22.8 (73.0)	24.1 (75.4)	24.9 (76.8)	24.7 (76.5)	23.5 (74.3)	23.1 (73.6)	23.2 (73.8)	23.3 (73.9)	23.3 (73.9)	23.1 (73.6)	22.6 (72.7)	23.4 (74.1)
Record low °C (°F)	15 (59)	17 (63)	20 (68)	20 (68)	20 (68)	21 (70)	18 (64)	20 (68)	18 (64)	20 (68)	20 (68)	20 (68)	15 (59)
Average precipitation mm (inches)	22.7 (0.89)	24.4 (0.96)	40.4 (1.59)	117.4 (4.62)	230.4 (9.07)	320.8 (12.63)	226.8 (8.93)	138.1 (5.44)	174.6 (6.87)	281.7 (11.09)	184.5 (7.26)	65.9 (2.59)	1,827.7 (71.96)
Source 1:
Source 2:

== Seismology ==
The Geological Survey of India has identified Thiruvananthapuram as a moderately earthquake-prone urban centre and categorized the city in the Seismic III Zone.
