= Kadakkavoor railway station =

Railway station in Kerala, India

Kadakkavoor

General information
- Location: Kadakkavoor, Thiruvananthapuram, Kerala; India
- Coordinates: 8.6787°N 76.7677°E
- System: Regional rail and Commuter rail station
- Owner: Indian Railways
- Operator: Southern Railway zone
- Line: Kollam–Thiruvananthapuram trunk line
- Platforms: 3

Construction
- Structure type: At-grade
- Parking: Available
- Accessible: Disabled access

Other information
- Status: Functioning
- Station code: KVU
- Zone(s): Southern Railway zone
- Division(s): Thiruvananthapuram
- Fare zone: Indian Railways

History
- Opened: 1918; 108 years ago
- Electrified: 2006
Location
- Location within Kerala Location within India

Kadakkavoor railway station (station code: KVU) is an NSG-6 category railway station on the Kollam–Thiruvananthapuram trunk line, serving Kadakkavoor in Thiruvananthapuram district, Kerala, India. It is in the Thiruvananthapuram railway division of the Southern Railway; the line opened to traffic on 1 January 1918.

The line through Kadakkavoor, part of the Ernakulam–Thiruvananthapuram route, was electrified in December 2006. A refurbished platform at the station was inaugurated in January 2016. A road over-bridge has been proposed to replace the level crossing (No. 570) near the station.

Preceding station	Indian Railways	Following station
Akathumuri towards	Southern Railway zone Kollam–Thiruvananthapuram trunk line	Chirayinkeezhu towards
