= Vennicode =

- village
- Location in Kerala, India Vennicode (India)
- Coordinates: 8°43′0″N 76°46′0″E
- Country: India
- State: Kerala
- District: Thiruvananthapuram
- Talukas: Varkala Taluk

Languages
  - Official: Malayalam, English
- Time zone: UTC+5:30 (IST)
- PIN: 695318
- Vehicle registration: KL-16

Vennicode is an area of Cheruniyoor panchayat in Varkala Taluk of Thiruvananthapuram District State of Kerala in India. The Nearest Railway Station is Akathumuri railway station and Airport is Thiruvananthapuram International Airport.

Vennicode was once the abode of British and Dutch people and the old houses built up by them were called Bungalows. Vennicode was the home of a British man called Venni Saipe who was actively involved in procuring tapioca flour (dried and powdered tapioca) and sourcing it to soldiers during the second world war. The remnants of a customs house built during the British era still exist here located opposite to the Akathumuri Railway station. There is a story that the erstwhile Ruler of Travancore allocated this land (surrounded by water on all three sides) to Ezhava warriors who helped the King to win over Deshaganadu (Pandalam)- Venni means victory, land assigned to victorious people came to be known as Vennicode (Abode of Victory).
