= Kollam–Thiruvananthapuram trunk line =

Railway line in India

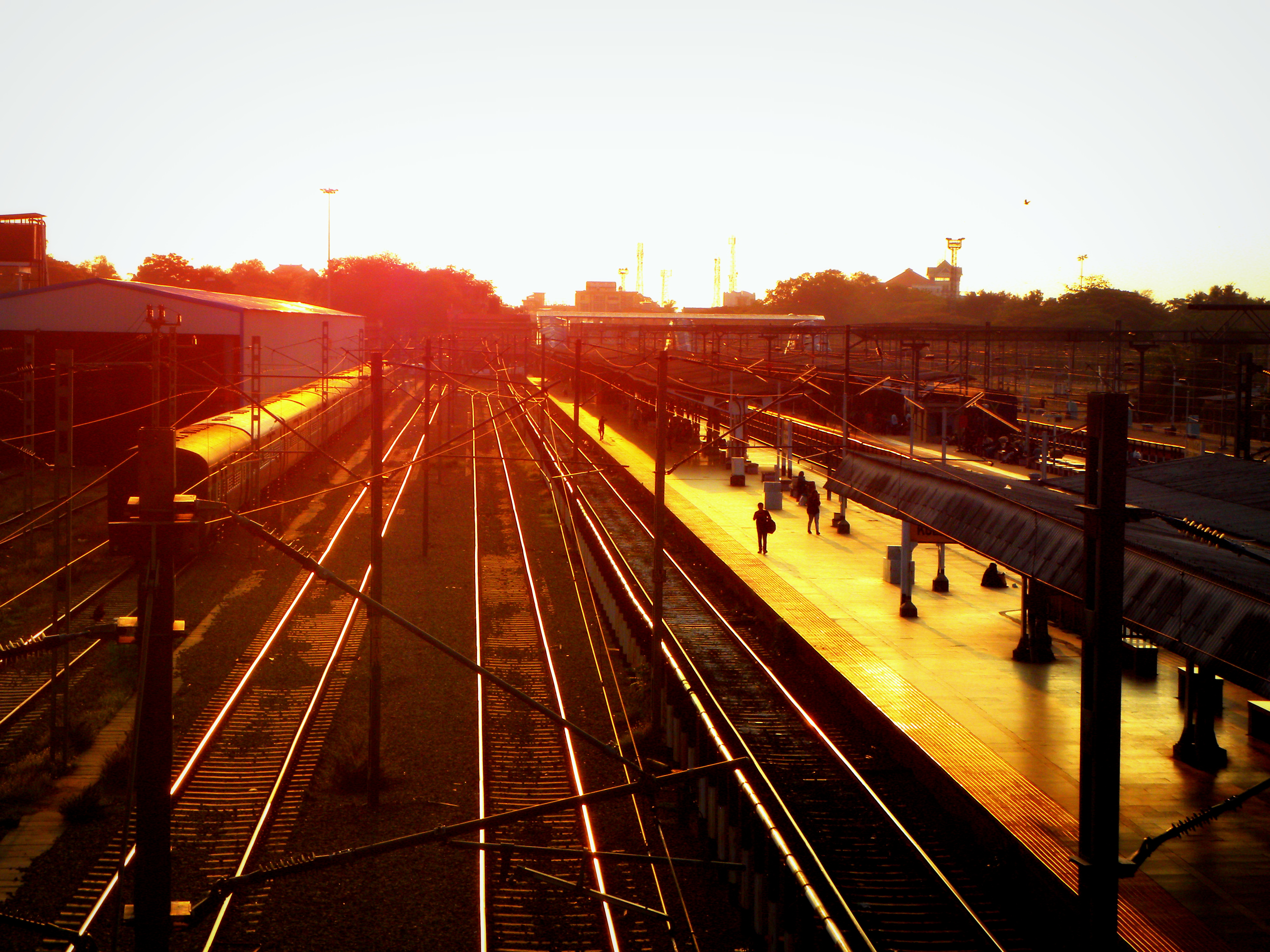
- View of the rail line passing through Kollam Junction

Overview
- Status: Operational
- Owner: Southern Railway zone
- Locale: Kerala
- Termini: Kollam Junction (QLN); Thiruvananthapuram Central (TVC)
- Stations: 18
- Website: Southern Railway

Service
- Type: Inter-city rail
- System: Electrified
- Services: 69 pair express trains 4 pair passenger trains
- Operator: Thiruvananthapuram Div.
- Depot(s): Kochuveli, Thiruvananthapuram, Kollam
- Rolling stock: WAP-1, WAP-4 electric locos; WAP-7 WDS-6, WDM-2, WDM-3A, WDP-4 and WDG-3A, WDG-4

History
- Opened: 4 January 1918; 108 years ago
- Extension up to TVC: 1931; 95 years ago
- Electrification: 2006; 20 years ago

Technical
- Line length: 65 kilometres (40 mi)
- Number of tracks: 2
- Character: At–grade
- Track gauge: 1,676 mm (5 ft 6 in)
- Old gauge: 1,000 mm (3 ft 3 3/8 in)
- Loading gauge: 4,725 mm × 3,660 mm (15 ft 6.0 in × 12 ft 0.1 in) (BG)
- Electrification: 25 kV AC OHLE
- Operating speed: 110 km/h (68 mph)

Kollam–Thiruvananthapuram trunk line is a railway line in Southern Railway zone connecting the cities of Kollam and Thiruvananthapuram in the state of Kerala, India. The line was opened on 4 January 1918 as the extension of Madras–Quilon line during metre gauge era.

== History ==
South Indian Railway Company has opened the Quilon–Sengottai railway line in 1902 with an intention to connect Kollam, the commercial capital of Travancore with Madras. Port of Quilon and the city's commercial reputation has urged the British rulers to connect the city of Quilon with Madras for the smooth transportation of goods including Pepper, Cashew, and spices. Later on 4 January 1918, South Indian Railway Company has opened the Kollam–Thiruvananthapuram extension up to Chala. The terminus was shifted to Trivandrum Central (Thampanoor) and was inaugurated in 1931.

== Administration ==
This line falling under the administrative control of Thiruvananthapuram railway division of the Southern Railway zone connects with Thiruvananthapuram–Kanyakumari line in South, Kollam–Kayamkulam line in North and Kollam–Punalur–Sengottai line in the East.

== Stations ==
| No. | Station | Category | Avg. daily passengers | Avg. daily revenue |
|---|---|---|---|---|
| 1 | Kollam Junction | NSG-2 | 23,285 | 18,48,050 |
| 2 | Eravipuram | HG-2 | 225 | 3,022 |
| 3 | Mayyanad | NSG-6 | 412 | 7,200 |
| 4 | Paravur | NSG-5 | 2,761 | 40,480 |
| 5 | Kappil | HG-3 | 43 | 513 |
| 6 | Edava | NSG-6 | 532 | 3,024 |
| 7 | Varkala Sivagiri | NSG-4 | 11,427 | 3,04,661 |
| 8 | Akathumuri | HG-3 | 34 | 677 |
| 9 | Kadakkavoor | NSG-6 | 967 | 18,844 |
| 10 | Chirayinkeezhu | NSG-5 | 2,581 | 39,965 |
| 11 | Perunguzhi | HG-2 | 93 | 859 |
| 12 | Murukkampuzha | NSG-6 | 195 | 2,937 |
| 13 | Kaniyapuram | HG-2 | 345 | 3,474 |
| 14 | Kazhakoottam | NSG-5 | 1881 | 75,342 |
| 15 | Veli | HG-2 | 62 | 995 |
| 16 | Thiruvananthapuram North | NSG-3 | 1,720 | 666420 |
| 17 | Thiruvananthapuram Pettah | NSG-6 | 914 | 14,307 |
| 18 | Thiruvananthapuram Central | NSG-2 | 39,157 | 52,91,536 |

== Economy ==
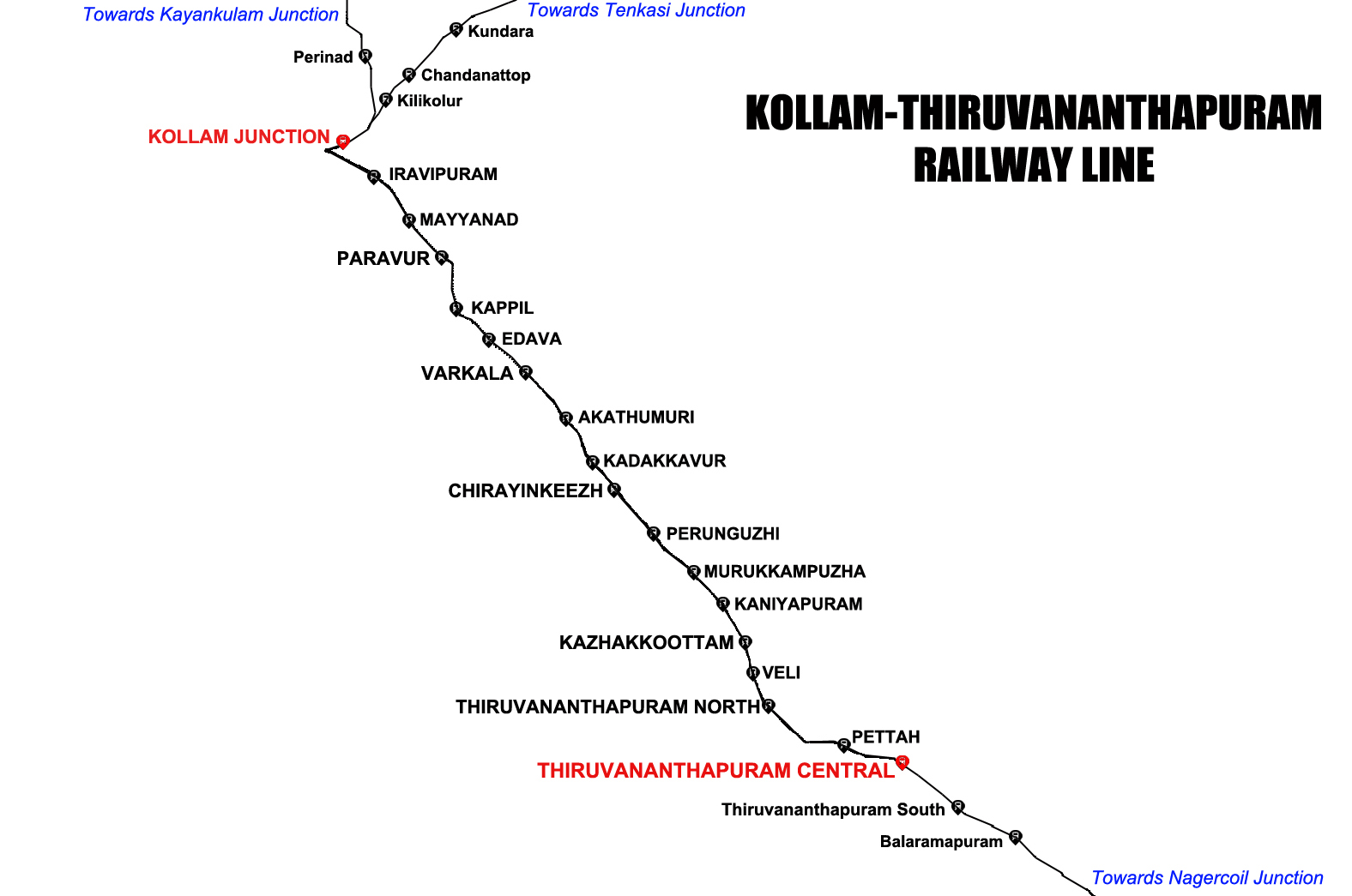
Kollam-Thiruvananthapuram railway line

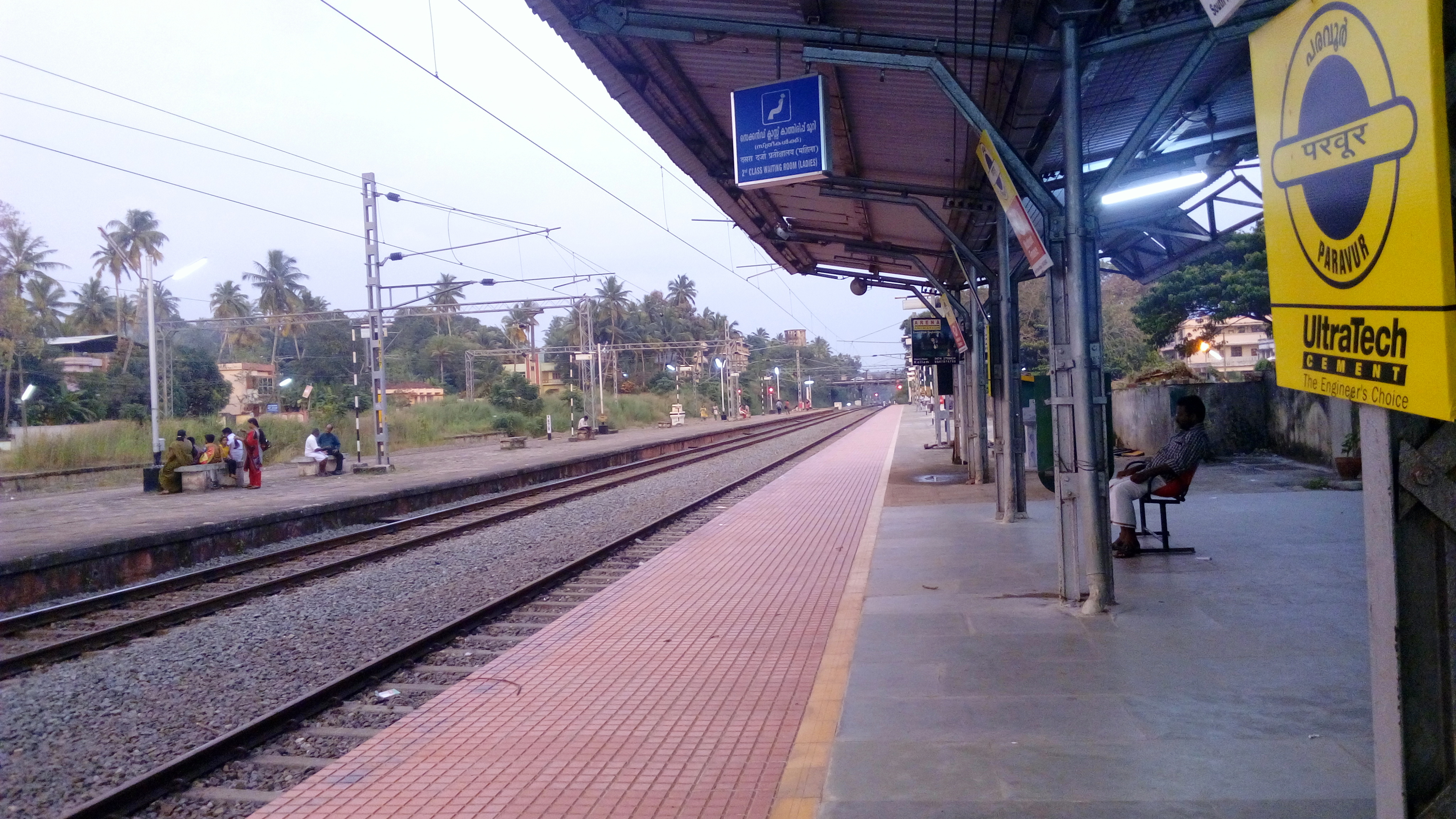
Paravur railway station

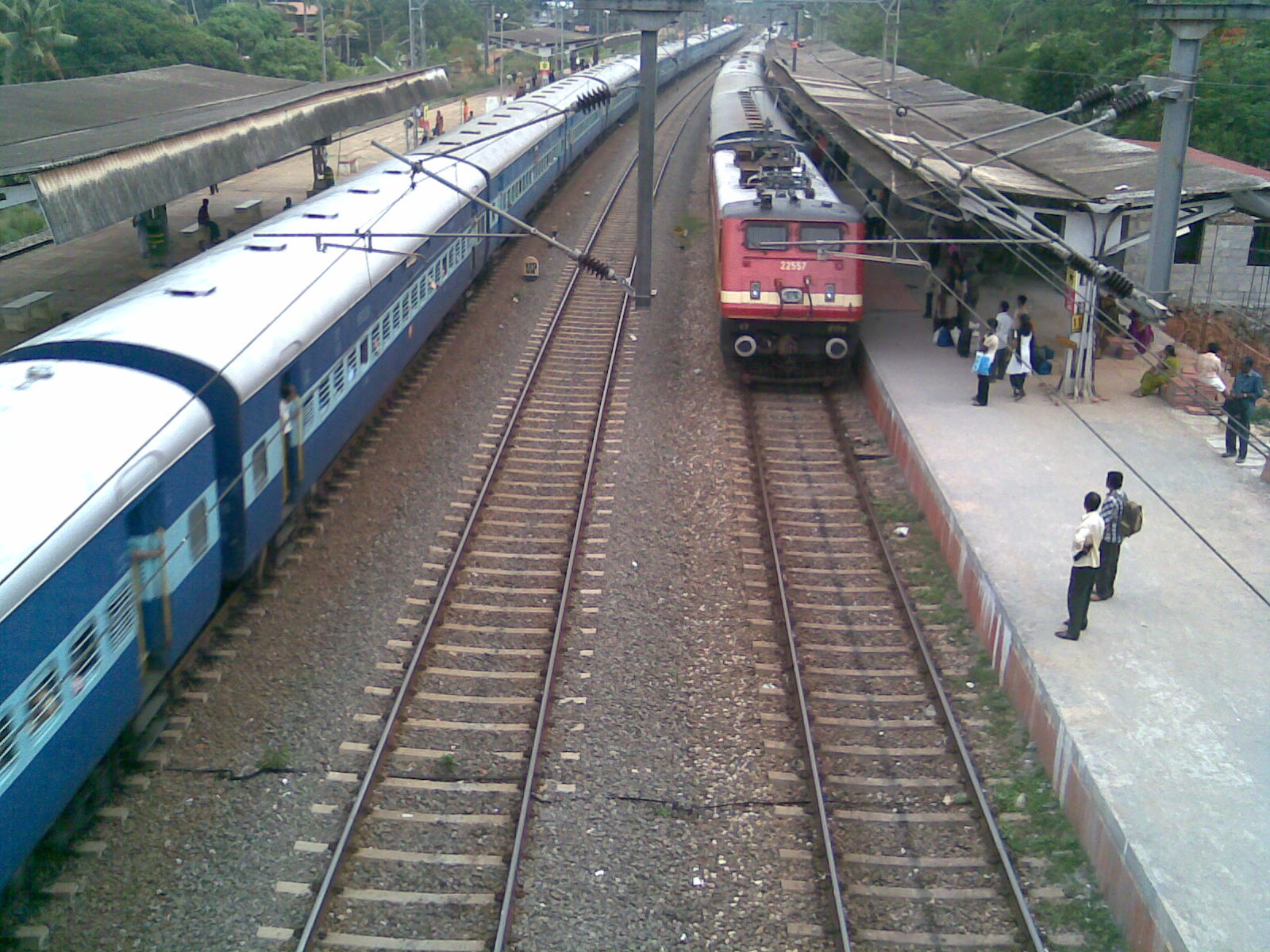
Varkala railway station

Five stations were prominent lying in between Kollam & Thiruvananthapuram posted well above ₹1 crore (equivalent to ₹1.7 crore or US$180,000 in 2023) in annual passenger ticket revenue during the fiscal year 2012-13 and most of their revenue increased during the year 2016–2017.

| No. | Station | Category | Revenue(2018–19) | Revenue(2023–24) |
|---|---|---|---|---|
| 1 | Paravur | NSG 5 | Rs. 1,47,75,303 | Rs. 2,12,46,999 |
| 2 | Varkala | NSG 4 | Rs. 11,12,01,390 | Rs. 21,07,47,961 |
| 3 | Kadakkavoor | NSG 6 | Rs. 68,78,061 | Rs. 82,45,333 |
| 4 | Chirayinkeezhu | NSG 5 | Rs. 1,45,87,352 | Rs. 2,10,73,991 |
| 5 | Kazhakoottam | NSG 5 | Rs. 2,74,99,689 | Rs. 4,07,80,421 |
| 6 | Thiruvananthapuram North | NSG 3 | -- | Rs. 56,81,83,342 |

== Services ==
There are currently 67 pairs of services, including 25 pairs of daily services(4 pairs of passengers, 18 pairs of express trains and 3 pairs of Super Fast trains) plying through Kollam-Thiruvananthapuram line. Kollam Junction is the 2nd busiest railway station in the state in terms of number of services passing through along with trains handled per day and 4th busiest in terms of total annual passengers.
