= Alamcode =

Alamcode may refer to:

- Alamcode, Malappuram, Kerala, India
- Alamcode, Thiruvananthapuram, Kerala, India
