= Keezhattingal (village) =

Keezhattingal (Meaning: Behind of Attingal)
- Location in Kerala, India Keezhattingal (India)
- Coordinates: 8.6891°N 76.7877°E
- Country: India
- State: Kerala
- District: Thiruvananthapuram
- Talukas: Chirayinkeezhu

Government
  - Body: Kadakkavoor

Population (2011)
  - Total: 15,185

Languages
  - Official: Malayalam, English
- Time zone: UTC+5:30 (IST)
- PIN: 695306
- Telephone code
- Vehicle registration: KL-01,KL-16

Keezhattingal is a village in Thiruvananthapuram district in the state of Kerala, India.

== Demographics ==
As of 2011 India census, Keezhattingal had a population of 15185 with 6819 males and 8366 females.
