= Karavaram =

- village
- Location in Kerala, India Karavaram (India)
- Coordinates: 8.75227°N 76.8029°E
- Country: India
- State: Kerala
- District: Thiruvananthapuram
- Talukas: Chirayinkeezhu

Government
  - Body: Gram panchayat

Population (2011)
  - Total: 15,898

Languages
  - Official: Malayalam, English
- Time zone: UTC+5:30 (IST)
- PIN: 695605
- Vehicle registration: KL-16

Karavaram is a village in Chirayinkeezhu Taluk of Trivandrum district in the state of Kerala, India.

== Demographics ==
As of 2011 India census, Karavaram had a population of 15898 with 7275 males and 8623 females.
