= Robert Orme =

East India Company civil servant (1728–1801)

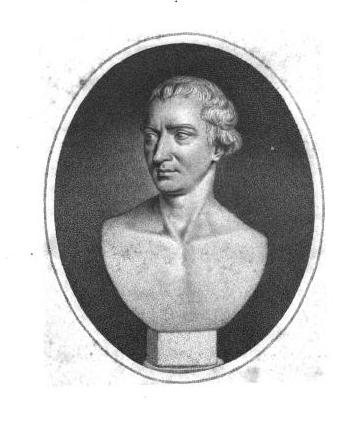
- Robert Orme, after the bust by Joseph Nollekens.
- Born: 25 December 1728; Anjengo, Travancore State
- Died: 13 January 1801 (aged 72); Great Ealing, Middlesex
- Occupation: historian

Robert Orme (25 December 1728 – 13 January 1801) was a British historian of India. Son of a British East India Company physician and surgeon, he entered the service of the Company in Bengal in 1743. He was regarded as an authority on India.

He was appointed as a Member of the Council at Fort St. George, Madras, between 1754 and 1758. In that capacity he was instrumental in the sending of a young Robert Clive as the head of a punitive expedition in 1757 to Calcutta, after the Black Hole incident of 1756. He returned to England in 1760, and was appointed as historiographer to the British East India Company in 1769.

Orme wrote A History of the Military Transactions of the British Nation in Indostan from 1745 (1763–78). He also published Historical Fragments of the Mogul Empire, the Morattoes and English Concerns in Indostan from the year 1659 (1782).

== Life ==
Born on Christmas Day 1728 at Anjengo, Travancore State, India, he was the second son of Alexander Orme, a physician and surgeon in the service of the East India Company. His mother's maiden name was Hill. He was sent when about two years old to the house of his aunt, Mrs. Robert Adams, in Cavendish Square, London. From about 1734 to 1741 he was educated at Harrow School under Dr James Cox, and was then placed for a year in the office of the accountant-general of the Royal African Company.

In 1742 Orme went to Calcutta, where his elder brother William was a Writer in the East India Company. Orme engaged himself in the mercantile house of Jackson & Wedderburn at Calcutta, and made a voyage to Surat. On returning to Calcutta in 1743 he was himself appointed a Writer in the East India Company's service. He acquired a reputation for knowledge of Indian customs, and in 1752 was asked to state his opinion on the regulation of the police in Calcutta. In 1753 he visited England, and during his absence in 1754 was appointed by the court of directors a member of the council at Madras. Returning to India, he arrived at Madras on 14 September 1754. He took an active part in the deliberations of the council respecting the military operations in the Carnatic, 1754–8, and recommended the appointment of Clive to command the expedition against Suráj-ud-Dowlah. Orme was for some years close to Clive, but the friendship was broken off about 1769.

From 1757 to 1758 Orme was commissary and accountant-general. At the end of 1758, his health being poor, he left India with a small fortune. The Grantham, the ship in which he sailed, was captured by the French on 4 January 1759 and taken to Mauritius. Orme ultimately reached Nantes in France in the spring of 1760.

In the autumn of 1760 Orme bought a house in Harley Street, London. He was elected fellow of the Society of Antiquaries of London on 8 November 1770, and from about 1769 till his death was salaried historiographer to the East India Company.

In 1792 Orme retired to Great Ealing, Middlesex, where he died on 13 January 1801, in his 73rd year. He was buried on 21 January in the churchyard of St. Mary's, Ealing where there was a memorial tablet. He was an admirer of Samuel Johnson.

== Works ==
In 1752 Orme drew up part of A General Idea of the Government and People of Indostan. This was afterwards completed, and posthumously published in Orme's Historical Fragments, edition of 1805. Orme was given access to the records at the India House, and obtained information from the Marquis de Bussy-Castelnau, whom he visited in 1773 at his country seat in France.

In London, Orme formed a library of ancient and modern classics, and arranged his materials – collected since 1742 – for an Indian history. In August 1763 he published the first volume of his major work, A History of the Military Transactions of the British Nation in Indostan from the year 1745; vol. ii. was published in two parts in 1778. Orme was complimented on his work by Sir William Jones.

George Bruce Malleson, in his History of the French in India, thought Orme's history generally accurate, though failing to treat the French as principals in the story. Orme told Samuel Parr that in preparing the third volume he completely formed every sentence in his mind before writing it down. A third edition of the work appeared in 1780, a fourth in 1790, a fifth in 1799. There were other editions in 1803 and 1861 in London, and Madras. In 1782 Orme published Historical Fragments of the Mogul Empire, of the Morattoes, and of the English Concerns in Indostan from the year 1659. This was reprinted in 1805 (London), with a memoir of the author, giving some extracts from his correspondence with William Robertson the historian, and others (cf. Edin. Rev. January 1807, p. 391 seq.). Orme's essays "On the Origin of the English Establishment … at Broach and Surat" and "A General Idea of the Government and People of Indostan" were included in this volume.

== Family ==
Orme was married, but this is said to have been unknown even to close friends during his lifetime. The court of directors of the East India Company gave his widow an annuity.

== Legacy ==
A bust of Orme at the age of forty-six, made in 1774 by Joseph Nollekens, was bequeathed to the East India Company; an engraving of it forms the frontispiece to Orme's Historical Fragments, ed. 1805.

Orme bequeathed to his friend and executor, John Roberts, chairman of the court of directors, all his books, manuscripts, &c., with a request – duly carried out – that he would present them to the East India Company. This collection, which went to the library of the India Office, consisted of 51 volumes of printed tracts on India and the East India Company; 231 manuscript volumes, compiled by Orme, containing information on Indian affairs; letters relating to the company's affairs; and maps, charts, plans, &c. In the maps accompanying his published works Orme had marked hundreds of places for the first time. A part of Orme's library had been sold by him at Sotheby's about April 1796, when he gave up his house in Harley Street.
