= Perunguzhi =

- village
- Location in Kerala, India Perunguzhi (India)
- Coordinates: 8.50370°N 76.95219°E
- Country: India
- State: Kerala
- District: Thiruvananthapuram
- Talukas: Chirayinkeezhu

Languages
  - Official: Malayalam, English
- Time zone: UTC+5:30 (IST)
- PIN: 695305
- Telephone code: 91470
- Vehicle registration: KL-16
- Lok Sabha constituency: Attingal
- Vidhan Sabha constituency: Chirayinkeezhu

Perunguzhi is a village in Chirayinkeezh Taluk, Thiruvananthapuram District, Kerala. It is under the jurisdiction of Azhoor Panchayat. There are many temples and backwaters. It is situated 19km south of Varkala and 22km north of Trivandrum City.

== Transportation ==
Perunguzhi lies on the Thiruvananthapuram-Kollam railway route; only passenger trains halt here. There are buses to East Fort. Boat service in Kadinamkulam lake connects Perunguzhi and Perumathura.

== Temples ==
The biggest temple in Perunguzhi is Sree Rajarajaswari temple, which is believed to be over 1000 years old, and also so many temples so many traditions etc

== Economy ==
Coir industry is one of the major businesses in Perunguzhy. Gulf money is the source of people's income.

== Education ==
Govt. L.P. and V.P.U.P and Govt High school are located in the Panchayat of Azhoor.

== Tourism ==
The Agni Kavadi festival is one of the most celebrated day in perunguzhi Sree Rajarajeswari Temple. it draws many devotees. Sarkara Devi Temple, Chirayinkeezh is nearby. "Kadinamkulam Kayal" attracts many tourists.
