= Vettuthura =

- Suburb
- Vettuthura
- Location in Kerala, India
- Coordinates: 8°35′0″N 76°49′0″E
- Country: India
- State: Kerala
- District: Thiruvananthapuram

Languages
  - Official: Malayalam, English
- Time zone: UTC+5:30 (IST)
- PIN: 695303
- Nearest city: Thiruvananthapuram

Vettuthura is a suburb of Thiruvananthapuram, the capital of Kerala, India. The main job in this area is fishing.

== Geography ==
It is located at Kadinamkulam, Thiruvananthapuram Taluk, Kerala, India

== Location ==
Nearest airport is Thiruvananthapuram International Airport and nearest major railway station is Thiruvananthapuram Central. Though the railway station at Kazhakkoottam (Kaniyapuram) is closer, only passenger trains halt there. It is well connected to Thiruvananthapuram city by state road transport buses.The only seaport located near is Vizhinjam International Seaport Thiruvananthapuram
