= Malayinkeezhu =

- Town
- Nickname: Malayinkil
- Location in Kerala, India Malayinkeezhu (India)
- Coordinates: 8°29′21.2″N 77°02′15.3″E
- Country: India
- State: Kerala
- Metro: Thiruvananthapuram Metropolitan Area
- District: Thiruvananthapuram

Government
  - Body: Gram panchayat

Population (2011)
  - Total: 37,350

Languages
  - Official: Malayalam, English
- Time zone: UTC+5:30 (IST)
- PIN: 695571
- Vehicle registration: KL-74

Malayinkeezhu is a suburb of Trivandrum, the largest city and capital of the Indian state of Kerala. It is located at the south-eastern side of Thiruvananthapuram Metropolitan Area, and is at a distance of 13 km from the heart of the city. The town is famous for the religious festival named Malayinkeezhu Aarattu. Neyyar Wildlife Sanctuary, one of the major tourist destinations in Thiruvananthapuram district, is situated 17 km away from the town. The nearest airport is Trivandrum International Airport (16 km) and Balaramapuram Railway Station (9.1 km) is the nearest railway station. The Pincode of Malayinkeezhu Post Office is 695571 which comes under the postal circle of Neyyattinkara region.

== Demographics ==
As per report released by Census India 2011, Malayinkeezhu's population of 37,350 includes 18,250 males and 19,100 females.

The population of children aged 0-6 is 3351 that is 8.97% of total population of Malayinkeezhu. The female sex ratio of Malayinkeezhu is 1047 against Kerala state average of 1084. The child sex ratio of Malayinkeezhu is almost 968 compared to state average of 964. Malayinkeezhu's literacy rate is 95.01% higher than the state average of 94.00%. Male literacy of Malayinkeezhu is almost 96.79% and the female literacy rate is 93.32%.

== Sites ==
The Sree Krishna Swami Temple of Malayinkeezhu is famous for its divinity. Premium residential area in trivandrum

- Major Malayinkeezhu Sree Krishna Swamy Temple

== Industry ==
- Shine Industries
- STM Document Engineering Pvt Ltd
