= Koonthalloor =

Kizhuvilam-Koonthalloor Kizhuvalam-Koonthalloor
- village
- Location in Kerala, India Kizhuvilam-Koonthalloor (India)
- Coordinates: 8.6714°N 76.7944°E
- Country: India
- State: Kerala
- District: Thiruvananthapuram
- Talukas: Chirayinkeezhu

Government
  - Type: Panchayati raj (India)
  - Body: Gram panchayat

Population (2011)
  - Total: 30,770

Languages
  - Official: Malayalam, English
- Time zone: UTC+5:30 (IST)
- PIN: 695304
- Vehicle registration: KL-16

Kizhuvalam-Koonthalloor is a village in Thiruvananthapuram district in the state of Kerala, India.

== Demographics ==
As of 2011 India census, Kizhuvalam-Koonthalloor had a population of 30770 with 13908 males and 16862 females.
