= Alamcode, Thiruvananthapuram =

Alamcode
- Census Town
- Location in Kerala, India Alamcode (India)
- Coordinates: 8.503°N 76.952°E
- Country: India
- State: Kerala
- District: Thiruvananthapuram District
- Talukas: Chirayinkeezhu Taluk

Government
  - Body: Karavaram Grama Panchayat

Area
  - Total: 8.74 km^{2} (3.37 sq mi)

Population (2011)
  - Total: 14,762
  - Density: 1,690/km^{2} (4,370/sq mi)

Languages
  - Official: Malayalam, English
- Time zone: UTC+5:30 (IST)
- PIN: 695102
- Vehicle registration: KL-16

Alamcode is a census town and revenue village of Karavaram grama panchayat in Thiruvananthapuram district, Kerala, India. The nearest Airport is Trivandrum International Airport (33 km) and Kadakkavur Railway Station (6.3 km) is the nearest Railway Station.

== Demographics ==
As of the 2011 Census of India, Alamcode had a population of 14,762 with 6268 males and 7994 females.

== Administration ==
Alamcode revenue village is administered by Karavaram grama panchayat in Chirayinkeezhu block panchayat. The village falls under Chirayinkeezhu taluk for revenue administration. It is part of the Attingal Assembly constituency and the Attingal Lok Sabha constituency.

There is also a separate ward named Alamcode in Attingal municipality. This municipal ward is distinct from the census town of Alamcode in Karavaram Panchayat.
