= Ponganadu =

- town
- Location in Kerala, India Ponganadu (India)
- Coordinates: 8°45′39″N 76°47′46″E
- Country: India
- State: Kerala
- District: Thiruvananthapuram district
- Talukas: Chirayinkeezhu

Government
  - Type: Kilimanoor village
  - Body: Kilimanoor Gram panchayat
- Time zone: UTC+5:30 (IST)
- PIN: 695601
- Telephone code: 0470
- Vehicle registration: KL-01 and KL-16

Ponganadu is a village in the Thiruvananthapuram district, situated in the Indian state of Kerala.
