= Koduvazhannoor =

- village
- Location in Kerala, India Koduvazhannoor (India)
- Coordinates: 8.7276°N 76.8750°E
- Country: India
- State: Kerala
- District: Thiruvananthapuram
- Talukas: Chirayinkeezhu

Government
  - Type: state government
  - Body: Gram panchayat

Population (2011)
  - Total: 10,248

Languages
  - Official: Malayalam, English
- Time zone: UTC+5:30 (IST)
- PIN: 695612
- Vehicle registration: KL-16

Koduvazhannoor is a village in Thiruvananthapuram district in the state of Kerala, India.

== Demographics ==
As of 2011 India census, Koduvazhannoor had a population of 10248 with 4663 males and 5585 females.
