= Vellalloor =

- village
- Location in Kerala, India Vellalloor (India)
- Coordinates: 8.763871°N 76.834467°E
- Country: India
- State: Kerala
- District: Thiruvananthapuram
- Talukas: Chirayinkeezhu

Government
  - Body: Gram panchayat

Population (2011)
  - Total: 11,440

Languages
  - Official: Malayalam, English
- Time zone: UTC+5:30 (IST)
- PIN: 695601
- Vehicle registration: KL-16

Vellalloor is a village in Nagaroor grama panchayat Thiruvananthapuram district in the state of Kerala, India. The village is full of lush green paddy fields. It's around 5 km from Kilimanoor, where the mc road is passing through and 5 km from Kallambalam, where the NH 66 is passing through. Bus service is frequently available from both places.

Main places

The main locations in vellalloor are Keshavapuram, Oonnankallu junction, Palayam junction, Althara junction, cheepilkada junction, jawahar junction, Mavelil junction, mottalil junction, sivanmuku etc.

Educational institutions

Govt.LP School Vellalloor and Vivekodayam UP School are the main schools. Also there are anganavadis in Palayam and Jawahar junction.

== Demographics ==
As of 2011 India census, Vellalloor had a population of 11440 with 5271 males and 6169 females.
