= Poothura =

Human settlement in India

Poothura, is a place near Anjengo and Chirayinkeezhu in the coastal area in the Thiruvananthapuram District of Kerala.
