= Puthucurichy =

- village
- Location in Kerala, India Puthucurichy (India)
- Coordinates: 8°37′0″N 76°48′0″E
- Country: India
- State: Kerala
- District: Thiruvananthapuram

Government
  - Body: Kadinamkulam Gram panchayat

Languages
  - Official: Malayalam, English
- Time zone: UTC+5:30 (IST)
- PIN: 695303
- Telephone code: +91 471-XXXXXXX
- Vehicle registration: KL-22
- Nearest city: Thiruvananthapuram

Puthucurichy (spelled also Puthencurichy/Puthukurichy) is an area on the coast of Thiruvananthapuram Kerala, India. This residential area is situated between Mariyanad and Perumathura on Veli – Perumathura road.

Main landmarks are St. Michael's Church, Muhayyideen Juma Masjid, Puthucurichy Government Hospital, State Bank of Travancore, Telephone Exchange, Post Office.

The nearest Airport is Trivandrum International Airport and Murukkumpuzha Railway Station is the nearest Railway Station.

== Education ==
Schools include Our Lady Of Mercy Higher secondary school, and the Govt. L.P School.
