= Marianad =

Marianad Mariyanadu
- Town
- Location in Kerala, India Marianad (India)
- Coordinates: 8°35′58″N 76°48′57″E
- Country: India
- State: Kerala
- District: Thiruvananthapuram

Languages
  - Official: Malayalam, English
- Time zone: UTC+5:30 (IST)
- PIN: 695303
- Vehicle registration: KL-22
- Nearest city: Kazhakootam
- Lok Sabha constituency: Attingal

Marianad (also spelled Mariyanadu or Mariyanad) is a coastal town in south Indian state of Kerala. It belongs to Kadinamkulam grama panchayat in Thiruvananthapuram district of southern Kerala. Marianad is 25 KM away from Thiruvananthapuram city which is both district headquarters and state capital. Marianad is under the area of Puthukurichy post office and PIN code is 695303.

It is part of the Attingal Lok Sabha constituency

== History ==
Marianad was founded by Bishop Peter Bernard Periera who was the head of the Latin church in Thiruvananthapuram with the help of the Social Service society and other social volunteers. One of the known volunteers was an Italian nurse Lauretta Farina (from Caravaggio, Bergamo, Lombardia) who coordinated schools, health clinics, sports clubs, women's collective, etc. In the late 1970s, the fishers founded cooperative societies to avoid merchant money lenders to sell their fish.

== Economy ==
Marianad and the neighboring villages had trade connections with various Arab countries such as Saudi Arabia and the UAE from the 19th century onwards. The economy of the village is majorly based on fishing and the export of marine products. This industry helped people to develop their infrastructure and education in recent years.and some people are works and studying abroad countries like UK, Australia, Canada, USA etc

== Facilities ==
The major institutions in the government/private sector of Marianad include:

- Our Lady Of Assumption Church, Marianad
- Vidyasadan CBSE Central School, Marianad
- BPBPM Library, Marianad
- St.Xaviers College
- BPBPM Football ground(j)
- Animation Centre
- Muthoot Gold Loan, Pvt Finance, Puthucurichy
- Govt. Hospital, Puthenthope
- District Cooperative bank
- St. Michael's High School, Puthukurichy
- St. Vincent High school, Padinjattumukku
- Our Lady of Mercy Convent, Puthukurichy
- Coir Society, Padinjattumukku
- G Tracks Screen1 & 2 Cinemas Kadinamkulam
- Kadinamkulam Police Station
- State Bank of Travancore
- Jyoti Nilayam English Medium Higher Secondary School
- Government Ayurveda Dispensary
- Grace Motors Mariyanad
- Prince Tailors & Stores

Marianad is well connected by Kerala Transport Corporation buses departing every 30 minutes to Trivandrum city. For Marianad get the bus from Trivandrum bus station which named Perumathura. When driving to Marianad, take a left turn from Kaniyapuram on the Thiruvananthapuram–Kollam National Highway.
