= Edakkode =

- village
- Location in Kerala, India Edakkode (India)
- Coordinates: 8.6654°N 76.8459°E
- Country: India
- State: Kerala
- District: Thiruvananthapuram
- Talukas: Chirayinkeezhu

Government
  - Body: Gram panchayat

Population (2011)
  - Total: 12,994

Languages
  - Official: Malayalam, English
- Time zone: UTC+5:30 (IST)
- PIN: 695104
- Vehicle registration: KL-

Edakkode is a village in Thiruvananthapuram district in the state of Kerala, India.

== Demographics ==
As of 2011 India census, Edakkode had a population of 12994 with 5956 males and 7038 females.
