= Tangasseri Arch =

1939 colonial monument in Kerala, India

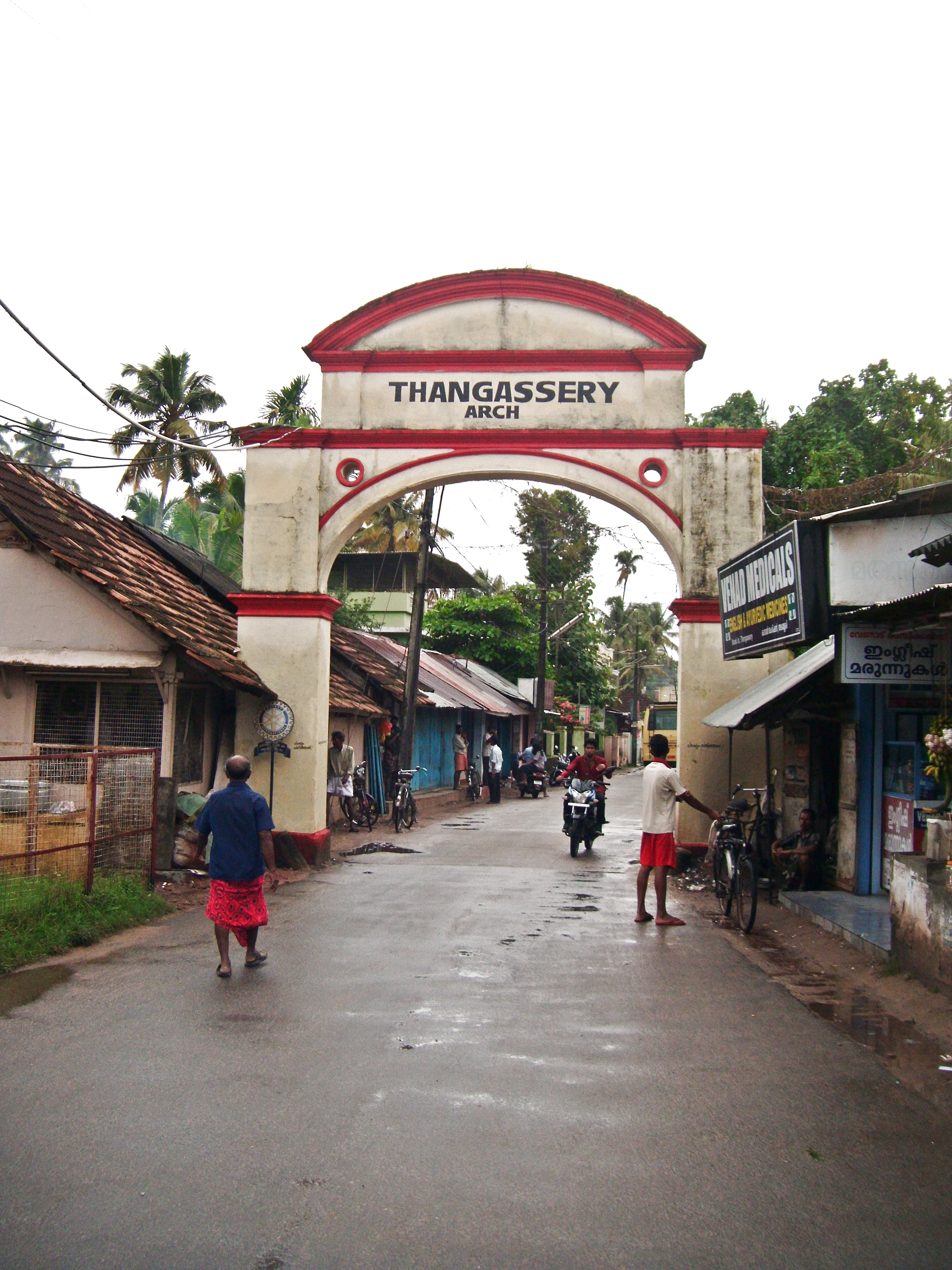
Tangasseri Arch

The Tangasseri Arch (also known as the Tangasseri Kamanam) is a 1939 colonial monument located in the coastal enclave of Tangasseri in Kollam, Kerala, India. Constructed during the British Raj, the arch historically served as the primary land gateway into the 99-acre British-administered territory of Tangasseri, separating it from the surrounding princely state of Travancore.

The structure reflects late-Victorian British colonial public works engineering adapted to local Indian materials. It consists of two massive vertical pillars supporting a large semi-circular archway spanning the main entry road.

Built by the British administration, the arch functioned as a customs check-post and border gateway. Because Tangasseri was a direct part of the Malabar District under the Madras Presidency, it operated under different legal, trade, and tax structures than neighboring Travancore. The archway was specifically erected to regulate and tax trade goods passing into the British enclave and control the influx of people entering the settlement. The junction itself named as Kaval Junction.
