= Chirayinkeezhu railway station =

Railway station in Kerala, India

Chirayinkeezhu

General information
- Location: Chirayinkeezhu, Thiruvananthapuram, Kerala; India
- Coordinates: 8.659597°N 76.7855035°E
- Elevation: 19 m (62 ft)
- System: Regional, light rail and commuter rail station
- Owner: Indian Railways
- Operator: Southern Railway zone
- Line: Kollam–Thiruvananthapuram trunk line
- Platforms: 2
- Tracks: 2

Construction
- Structure type: At–grade
- Parking: Yes
- Accessible: Disabled access

Other information
- Status: Functioning
- Station code: CRY
- Zone(s): Southern Railway zone
- Division(s): Thiruvananthapuram
- Fare zone: Indian Railways

History
- Opened: 1918; 108 years ago
Location
- Location within Kerala Location within India

Chirayinkeezhu railway station (station code: CRY) is an NSG–5 category Indian railway station in Thiruvananthapuram railway division of Southern Railway zone. It is a railway station in Thiruvananthapuram District, Kerala.

== Details of annual passenger earnings from Chirayinkeezhu railway station ==
| Year | Collection | Change in revenue | % Increase |
|---|---|---|---|
| 2015–2016 | Rs. 1,53,08,062 | NA | NA |
| 2016–2017 | Rs. 1,53,14,378 | Rs. 6,316 | 0.04% |
| 2017–2018 | Rs. 1,54,19,697 | Rs. 1,05,319 | 0.68% |
| 2018–2019 | Rs. 1,45,87,352 | Rs. -8,32,345 | -5.39% |

== Service ==
Some of the major trains having halt at the station.

| No. | Train No | Origin | Destination | Train Name |
|---|---|---|---|---|
| 1. | 16347/16348 | Thiruvananthapuram Central | Mangalore Central | Mangalore Express |
| 2. | 16629/16630 | Thiruvananthapuram Central | Mangalore Central | Malabar Express |
| 3. | 16301/16302 | Thiruvananthapuram Central | Shornur Junction | Venad Express |
| 4. | 16303/16304 | Thiruvananthapuram Central | Ernakulam Junction | Vanchinad Express |
| 5. | 16127/16128 | Chennai Egmore | Guruvayur | Guruvayur Express |
| 6. | 16381/16382 | Mumbai CST | Kanyakumari | Jayanthy Janatha Express |
| 7. | 16525/16526 | Bangalore City | Kanyakumari | Island Express |

Passenger Trains

| Sl No. | Train Number | Source | Destination | Name/Type |
|---|---|---|---|---|
| 1 | 56307 | Kollam Junction | Trivandrum Central | Passenger |
| 2 | 56700 | Madurai | Punalur | Passenger |
| 3 | 66304 | Kollam Junction | Kanyakumari | MEMU |
| 4 | 56309 | Kollam Junction | Trivandrum Central | Passenger |
| 5 | 56304 | Nagercoil | Kottayam | Passenger |
| 6 | 56701 | Punalur | Madurai | Passenger |
| 7 | 56308 | Trivandrum Central | Kollam Junction | Passenger |
| 8 | 66305 | Kanyakumari | Kollam Junction | MEMU |
