= Akathumuri railway station =

Railway station in Kerala, India

Akathumuri

General information
- Location: Akathumuri, Varkala, Thiruvananthapuram, Kerala; India
- Coordinates: 8.741°N 76.723°E
- Elevation: 4.57 m (15.0 ft)
- System: Regional rail and Light rail station
- Owner: Indian Railways
- Operator: Southern Railway
- Line: Kollam–Thiruvananthapuram line
- Platforms: 2
- Tracks: 2

Construction
- Structure type: Standard (on ground station)
- Parking: Yes
- Accessible: Disabled access

Other information
- Status: Functioning
- Station code: AMY
- Zone(s): Southern Railway zone
- Division(s): Thiruvananthapuram

History
- Opened: 1918; 108 years ago
- Electrified: 25 kV AC 50 Hz
- Former names: Akathumuri railway station

Passengers
- 2018–19: 34/day Annual Passengers – 12,286 (▲5.65%)
Route map
Location
- Location within Kerala Location within India

Akathumuri (HG3 F category) is one of the 4 railway stations serving the Varkala urban agglomeration in district of Thiruvananthapuram. It is 6 km from Varkala railway station and it is situated in Cheruniyoor Panchayat of Varkala Taluk. It is the nearest minor station for SR Medical College, Sri Sankara Dental College, Golden Island etc. In 2018–19 FY Akathumuri generated ₹2.47lakh profit from 12,286 passengers. It is the 19th most revenue-generating and 20th busiest railway station in Trivandrum district.
