= Mudakkal =

Mudakkal മുദാക്കല്‍ Elamba-Mudakkal
- village
- Nickname: മുദാക്കല്‍
- Location in Kerala, India Mudakkal (India)
- Coordinates: 8.7011°N 76.8589°E
- Country: India
- State: Kerala
- District: Thiruvananthapuram
- Talukas: Chirayinkeezhu

Government
  - Body: Gram panchayat

Population (2011)
  - Total: 20,314

Languages
  - Official: Malayalam, English
- Time zone: UTC+5:30 (IST)
- PIN: 695103
- Vehicle registration: KL-16

Elamba-Mudakkal is a village in Thiruvananthapuram district in the state of Kerala, India.

== Demographics ==
As of 2011 India census, Elamba-Mudakkal had a population of 20314 with 9381 males and 10933 females.
