= Anjengo (1802 ship) =

History

United Kingdom
- Name: Anjengo
- Namesake: Anchuthengu
- Owner: John Tady Dyne (Note: At the time Dyne was the British East India Company's commercial resident at Anjengo.)
- Builder: Captain Iepson, Anjengo
- Launched: 2 October 1802
- Fate: Unknown

General characteristics
- Tons burthen: 260 (bm)
- Length: 76 ft (23 m)
- Beam: 25 ft (8 m)

Anjengo was launched in 1802. At the time she was the largest vessel built at Anjengo. Her ultimate fate is currently unknown.

She had as a figurehead a carving of Diana the Huntress.
