= Kadinamkulam =

- Suburb
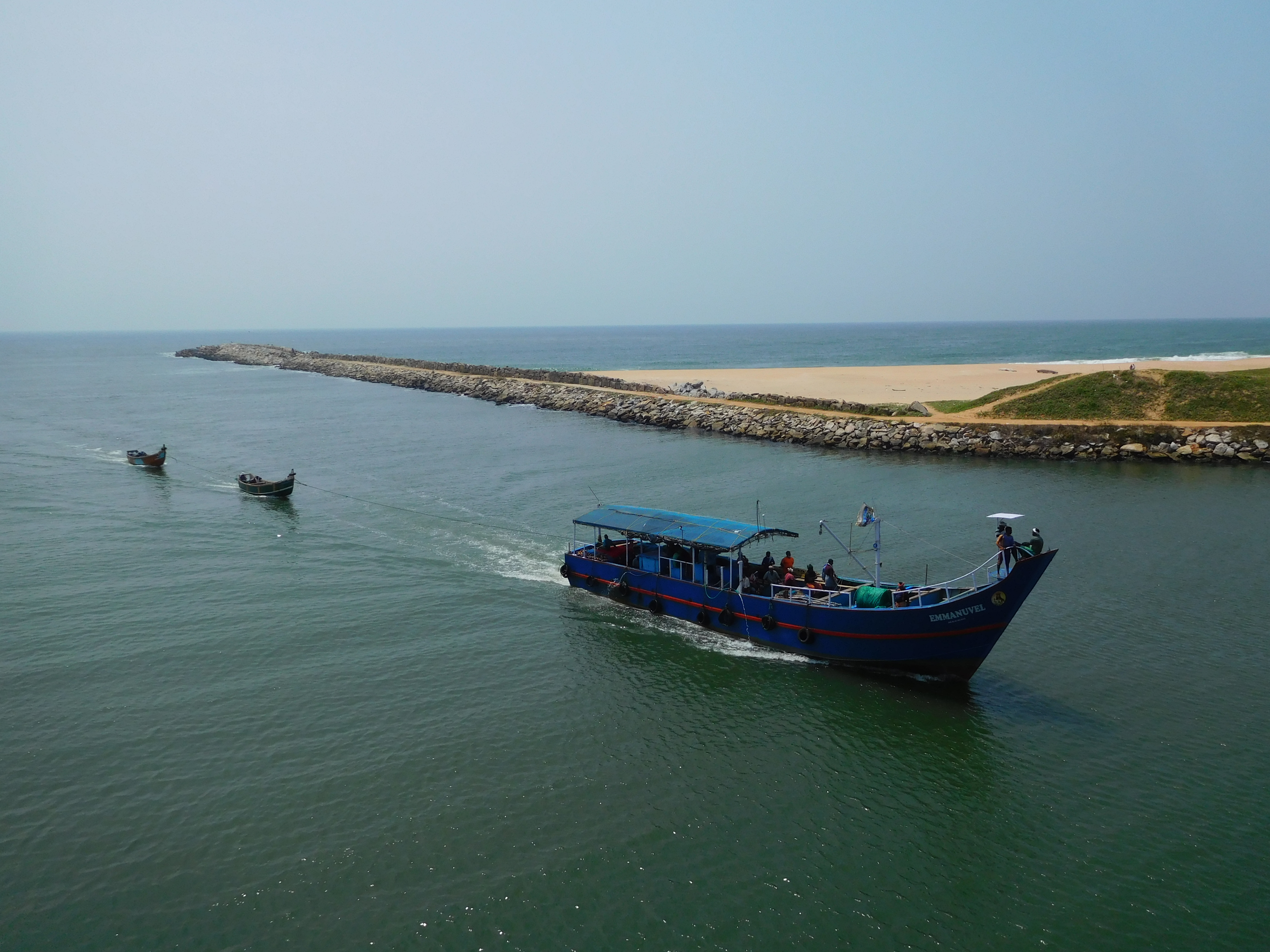
- A Fishing traveler in Kadinamkulam lake

- Location in Kerala, India Kadinamkulam (India)
- Coordinates: 8°36′0″N 76°49′0″E
- Country: India
- State: Kerala
- District: Thiruvananthapuram

Government
  - Body: Gram panchayat

Area
  - Total: 17.68 km^{2} (6.83 sq mi)

Population (2011)
  - Total: 46,476
  - Density: 2,629/km^{2} (6,808/sq mi)

Languages
  - Official: Malayalam, English
- Time zone: UTC+5:30 (IST)
- PIN: 695303
- Vehicle registration: KL-22
- Nearest city: Trivandrum
- Lok Sabha constituency: Attingal

Kadinamkulam is a Panchayat, Village and the northern suburb of Trivandrum City. It is one of the residential and industrial area of Trivandrum City in Kerala, India. It is situated 22 km north of Trivandrum, 20 km from Varkala, 20 km from the Trivandrum International Airport and 22 km from Trivandrum Central Railway station and bus station. National Highway 66 is also 8 km away. Kadinamkulam is surrounded by Kadinamkulam Kayal to the east, the Arabian Sea to the west, Puthucurichy to the north and Vettuthura to the south. Kadinamkulam forms part of Kadinamkulam panchayat of Trivandrum district. Kinfra international apparel park, Marian Engineering College etc. are situated in Menamkulam in Kadinamkulam Panchayat.

In the 2011 census it had a population of 28,868 in 6286 households.

== Economy ==
Kadinamkulam and the neighbouring villages had trade connections with various Arab countries such as Saudi Arabia and the UAE from the 19th century onwards. Until recently abroad countries like UK, Canada, Australia, USA etc., coir and fishing industries helped people to generate their source of income.

== Transportation ==
Kadinamkulam is well connected by Kerala Transport Corporation buses departing every 30 minutes to Trivandrum city. When driving to Kadinamkulam, take a left turn from Kaniyapuram on the Thiruvananthapuram–Kollam National Highway. For Marianad get bus from Trivandram bus station which named Perumathura

== Places of worship ==
Mundanchira muslim jammath, kadinamkulam
Kadinamkulam Mahadeva Temple
One of the most famous Shiva temples in South India. It is among the very few temples in South India where the Darshan (to where the Lord is facing) is towards the west.

Kadinamkulam Padickavilakom Bharanicadu Sree Bhagavathi Temple
The famous Bhadrakali temple located in Kadinamkulam. The festival starts on the Shivrathri day of every year.

Kaniyapuram Masjid
A mosque located in this panchayat.
Our Lady Of Assumption Church Marianad
Our Lady Of Assumption Church Marianad in Thiruvananthapuram
ST Micheal's Church Puthukurichy
One of the most famous St Micheal Church in Trivandrum. This Church was built by the British in 1925. It is also known as Ferona church in Trivandrum. Here the parish was decided by Kollam bishop rite rev father A.M.Bancegar in 1458.
