= Anchuthengu Fort =

Building in India

Coordinates: 8°39′46″N 76°45′52″E

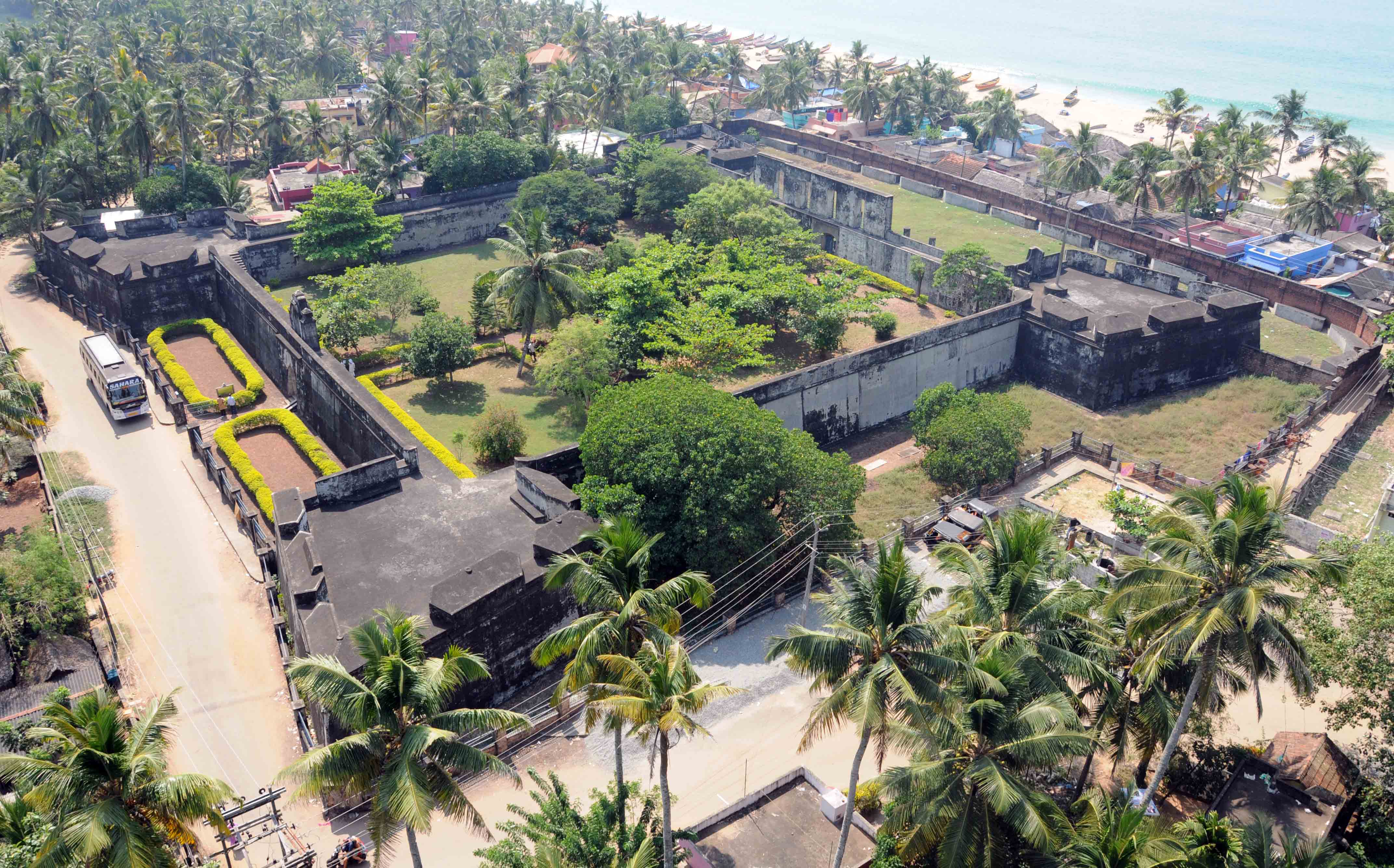
Anchuthengu fort

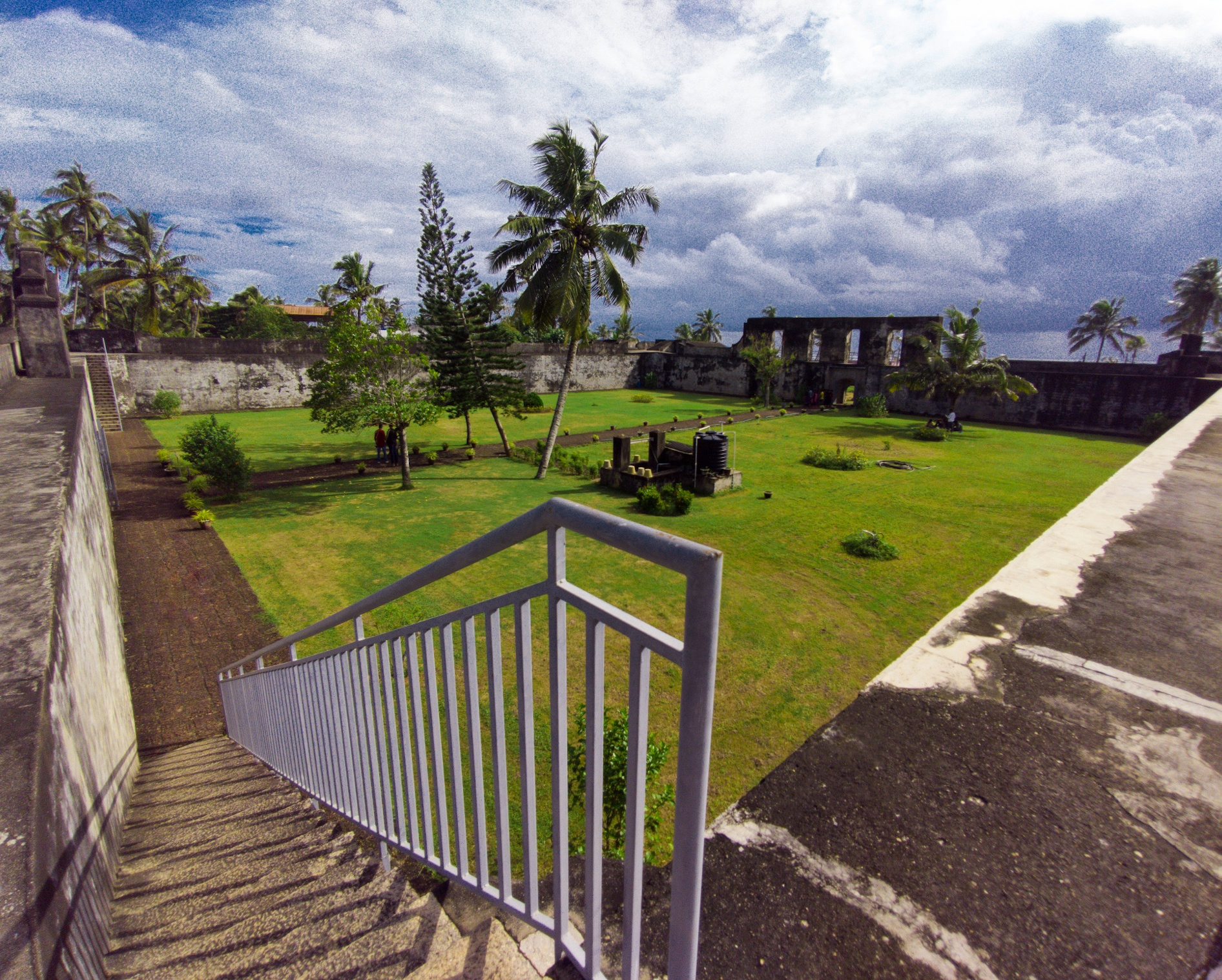
Anjengo Fort

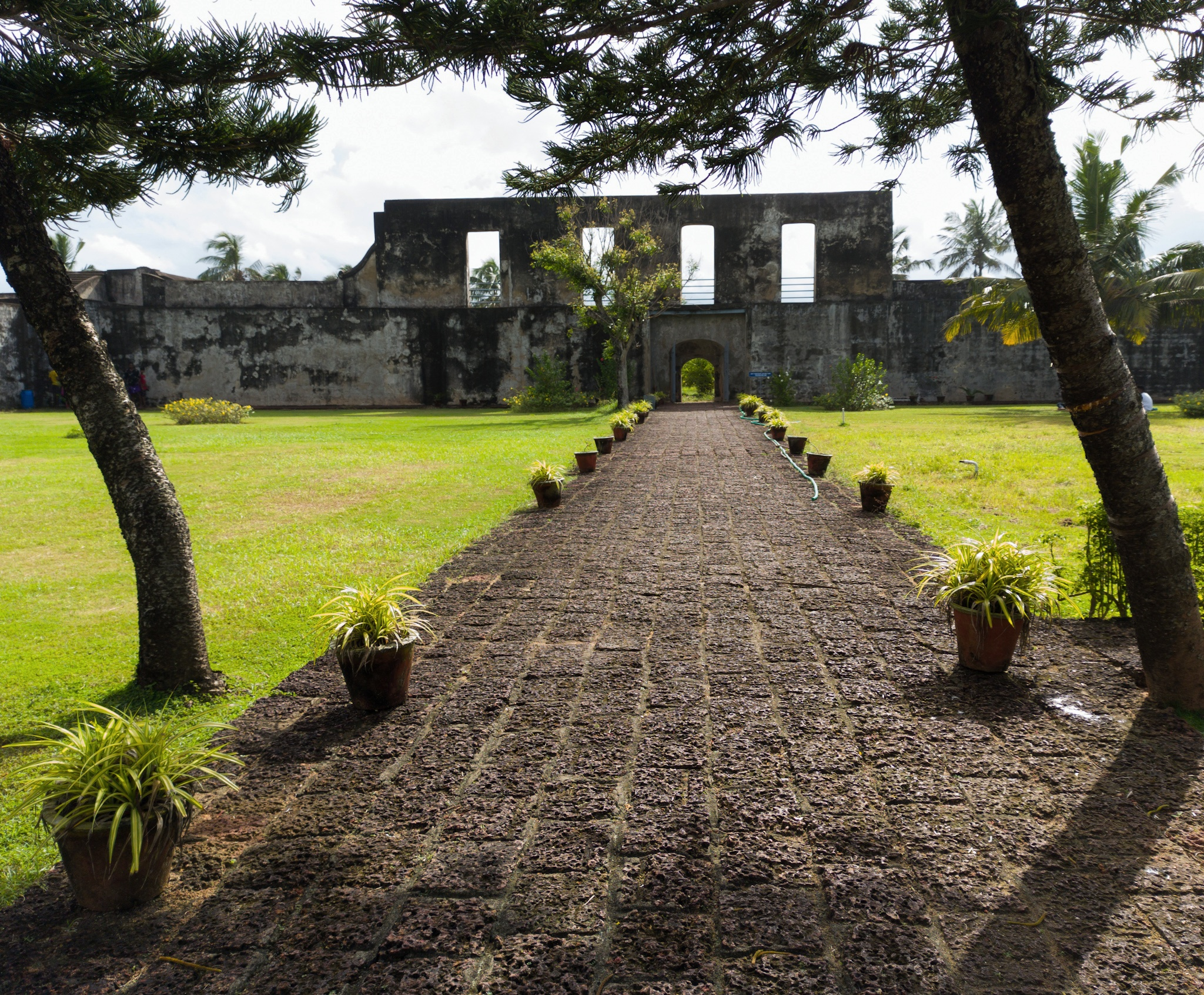
Anchuthengu Fort

The fort was the East India Company's first permanent post on the Malabar Coast. In November 1693, John Brabourne was sent by the British East India Company (EIC) to Attingal, where he obtained from Rani Ashure a grant of a site for a fort on the sandy spit of Anchuthengu (then known as Anjengo), together with the monopoly of the pepper trade of Attingal. The EIC commenced construction in January 1696.

In June 1696 British pirates in the ketch Josiah under Robert Culliford, destroyed the Bengal Pilot Service's sloop Gingali (or Gingalle) at Anjengo.

While construction was ongoing the Dutch lobbied the Rani against the fort's construction, as it would impact adversely on their own trade on the Malabar coast. She ordered Brabourne to stop building but he ignored her orders. The Rani then tried to starve out the British by cutting off supplies; but as they could be supplied from the sea, the land blockade proved ineffectual. She then sent an armed force against Brabourne but he defeated it and a peace was arranged.

The fort was completed in 1699, and a flourishing trade in pepper and cotton cloth speedily grew up. The fort served as the first signaling station for ships arriving from Britain.

The fort is 256 ft (78.0 m) square, with four bastions, each of which mounted eight 18-pounder guns. The walls between the bastions had seven or eight guns. In addition, there was a battery of some twenty 18&24-pounder guns facing the sea. The fort had a garrison of 400 Europeans and 70-80 topasses. Originally Anjengo was second in importance to the EIC only to Bombay Castle.

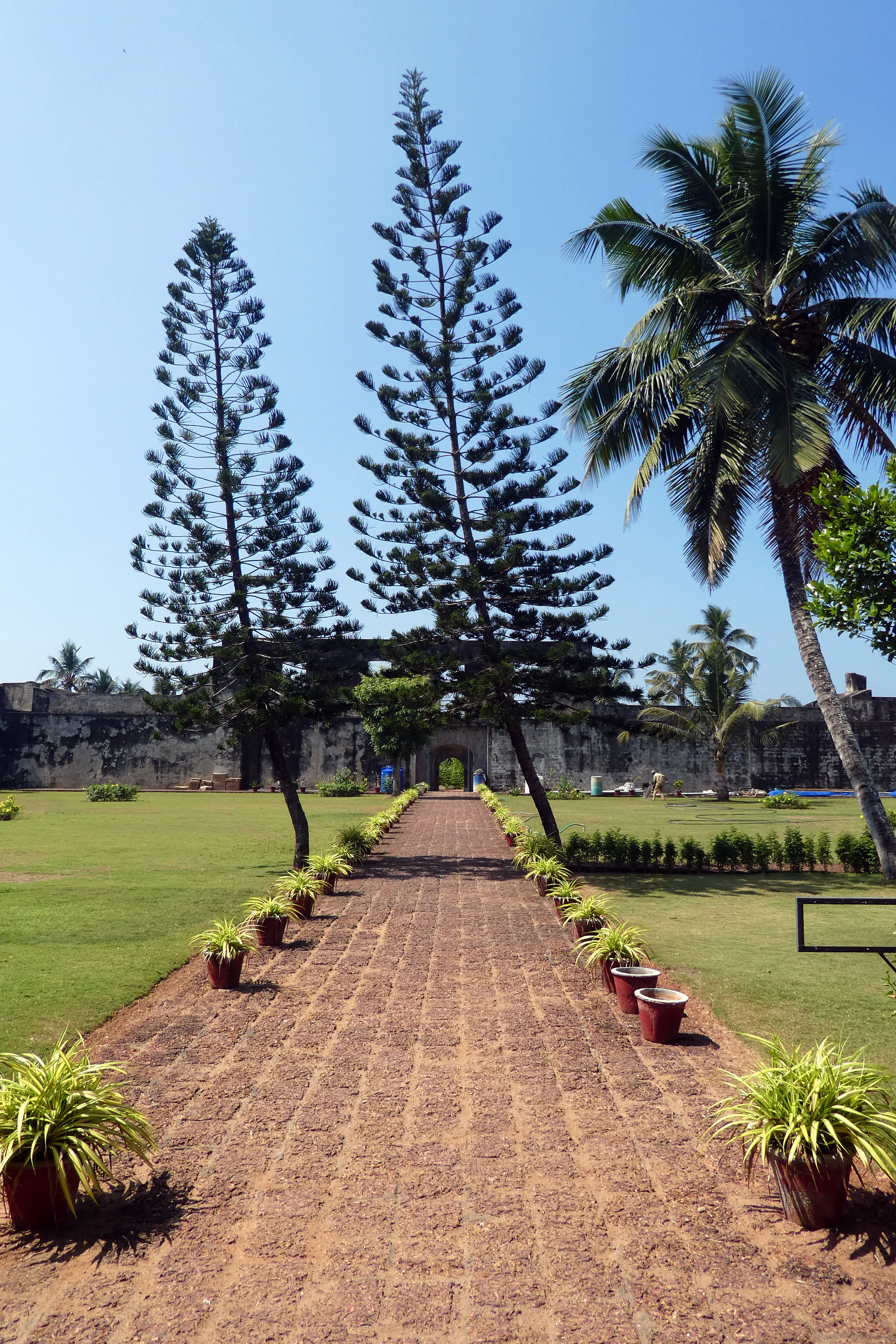
Inside the fort

Of more importance than the attack in 1697 was the incident at Attingal and subsequent siege in April 1721. Brabourne remained in charge of the fort until 1704 when, following the death of his wife, who was buried at the fort, he was succeeded by Simon Cowse. Cowse was in turn replaced by John Kyffin, although he remained at the fort as a free trader. Kyffin exploited his position for self-enrichment and became controversially involved in local politics. Rani Ashure had died some time around 1700 and her successor did not command the same authority (note that Attingal was matriarchal), which contributed to poor relations between her subjects and the British.

By 1717 Kyffin had retired and was replaced by William Gyfford who was if anything even more self serving and divisive than his predecessor and relations with the local people continued to deteriorate.

== The Siege of 1721 ==
In early 1721 in an attempt to improve relations with the Rani, Gyfford proposed to revive the practice of giving her annuals gifts, which had fallen into abeyance seven years before. On 11 April 1721, he travelled four miles up river to Attingal with a party of at least 240 people, including Cowse, and was greeted by a large friendly crowd. Gyfford's men were not carrying any reload ammunition as it was entrusted to the porters. However, the friendliest of the local noblemen was not present and Cowse being suspicious advised a return to the fort; this was endorsed by a message received from the Rani. Gyfford took no notice of these warnings and allowed his party to be contained in a small enclosure. In a gesture of goodwill his men discharged their firearms but then found that their reloads had been taken. Gyfford sent a message to the fort warning the remaining garrison of their plight and promising that he would return that night. However, at some point during the evening or following day his party was attacked and overcome. A small number of men managed to escape, including Cowse although he was killed during his flight, and made their way back to the fort.

Gyfford's wife, Catherine (nee Cooke) who had just been widowed for the third time at the age of 25, together with Cowse's wife, another lady and six children fled with the fort records to Chennai (then Madras) in a small local ship that had just delivered a cargo of cowries from the Maldives.

The fort was now besieged with a residual garrison of 35, mostly pensioners and boys, of whom only 20 were able to use a firearm. About 150 local people living around the fort whose houses had been burnt by the besiegers also took refuge inside. The defense was organised by the gunnery officer, Samuel Ince. On 25 April two EIC ships arrived from Kochi with supplies and 7 reinforcements. A message was also received from the Rajah of Quilon (now Kollam) offering sanctuary to the displaced locals and so 150 women and children were sent into his care. On 1 May a further 52 men arrived from Tellicherry (now Thalassery) and Calicut (now Kozhikode) as reinforcements.

The siege continued without incident until 24 June when there was a vigorous attack on three sides possibly inspired by rumours that the Rajah of Travancore was sending a relieving force. The attack was repelled without any fatalities in the garrison using artillery and grenades and thereafter no serious assault took place. In due course further reinforcements were received from Calicut and the Rani and her loyal subjects sent supplies. Although news of the siege had reached Bombay (now Mumbai) by the beginning of July the monsoon meant that no attempt to relieve the fort until October, when on 17th 300 men arrived from Carwar (now Karwar) and Surat and the fort was relieved.

== Later history ==
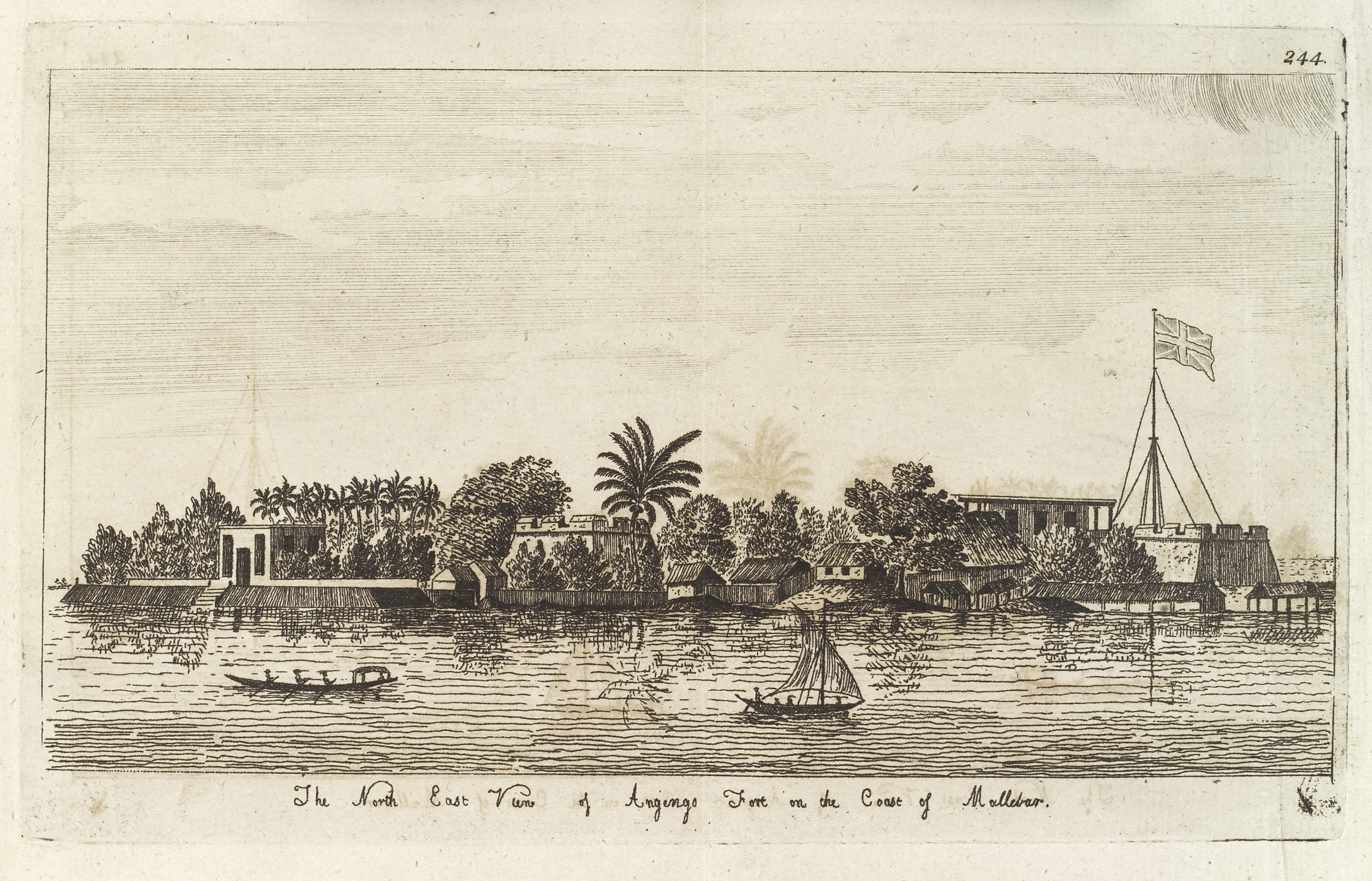
The north east view of Angengo Fort on the coast of Malabar, a sketch circa 1772

The fort played an important role in the Anglo-Mysore Wars. During the Anglo-Mysore wars the EIC stored ammunition at the fort.

In 1792 the EIC reduced Anjengo's formal status to that of a Residency. In 1810 the EIC abolished the Commercial Residency at Anjengo and handed over the responsibility for the fort to the Political Agent at Travancore. In 1813 the factory was closed.

In 1748 the Bombay Dockyard built the snow Luconia for the Anjengo Pilot Service.

In 1802 Anjengo, a ship of 260 tons (bm), was built at Anjengo, the first vessel of that large a size. The owner, John Tady Dyne, was one of the last EIC residents at Anjengo.
