= Azhoor =

- Panchayat
- Location in Kerala, India Azhoor (India)
- Coordinates: 8.648°N 76.8277°E
- Country: India
- State: Kerala
- Metro: Thiruvananthapuram Metropolitan Area
- District: Thiruvananthapuram
- Talukas: Chirayinkeezhu

Government
  - Body: Gram panchayat

Population (2011)
  - Total: 27,390

Languages
  - Official: Malayalam, English
- Time zone: UTC+5:30 (IST)
- PIN: 695304
- Vehicle registration: KL-16

Azhoor is a locality in Chirayinkeezhu, within Thiruvananthapuram district in the state of Kerala, India.

== Demographics ==
As of 2011 India census, Azhoor had a population of 27390 with 12386 males and 15004 females.
