= Akathumuri =

- Village
- Location in Kerala, India Akathumuri (India)
- Coordinates: 8°41′44″N 76°45′27″E
- Country: India
- State: Kerala
- District: Thiruvananthapuram

Government
  - Type: Panchayat
  - Body: Cheruniyoor Panchayat

Area
  - Total: 0.37 km^{2} (0.14 sq mi)

Languages
  - Official: Malayalam, English
- Time zone: UTC+5:30 (IST)
- Vehicle registration: KL-81
- Nearest city: Varkala

Akathumuri is a scenic lakeside village and an education hub in Cheruniyoor panchayat of Varkala Taluk in Thiruvananthapuram district of Kerala, India. Village is situated 7 km (4.3 mi) south of Varkala city centre and 39 km (24 mi) north of Trivandrum City.

== Transport ==
It is connected by road and rail by Akathumuri railway station. The railway station is not an important one, in the Thiruvananthapuram - Kollam route; only passenger trains halt here. Varkala Railway Station is the nearest major railway stations which is 7 km (4.3 mi) away. Thiruvananthapuram International Airport is the nearest airport which is 39 km (24 mi) away.
