= Anchuthengu =

- Anjengo
- Location in Kerala, India Anchuthengu (India)
- 8.4833°N 76.9167°E
- Location: Thiruvananthapuram, India

Site notes
- Architect(s): Portuguese, English
- Architectural styles: Portugal, England

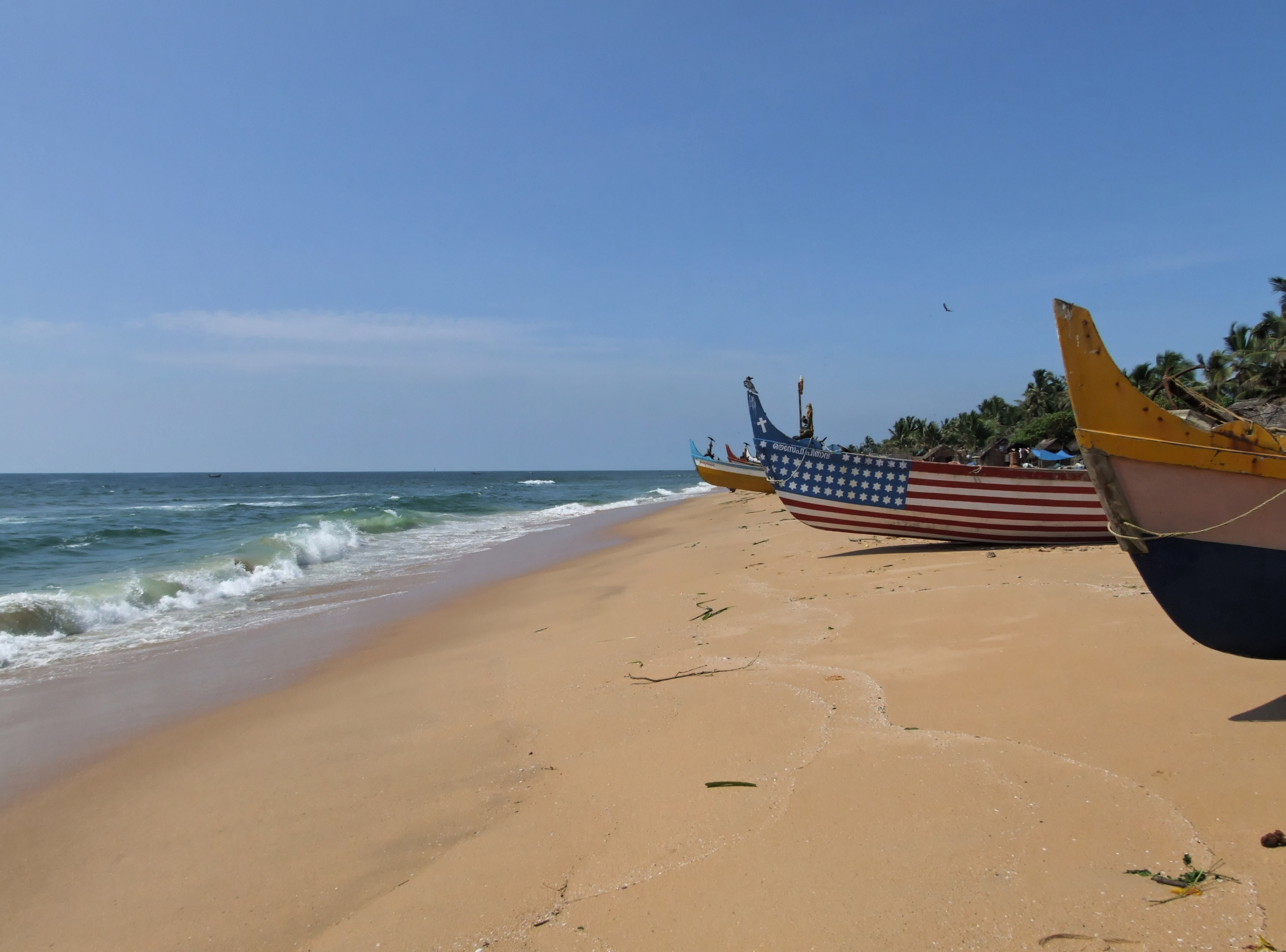
Anjengo Beach

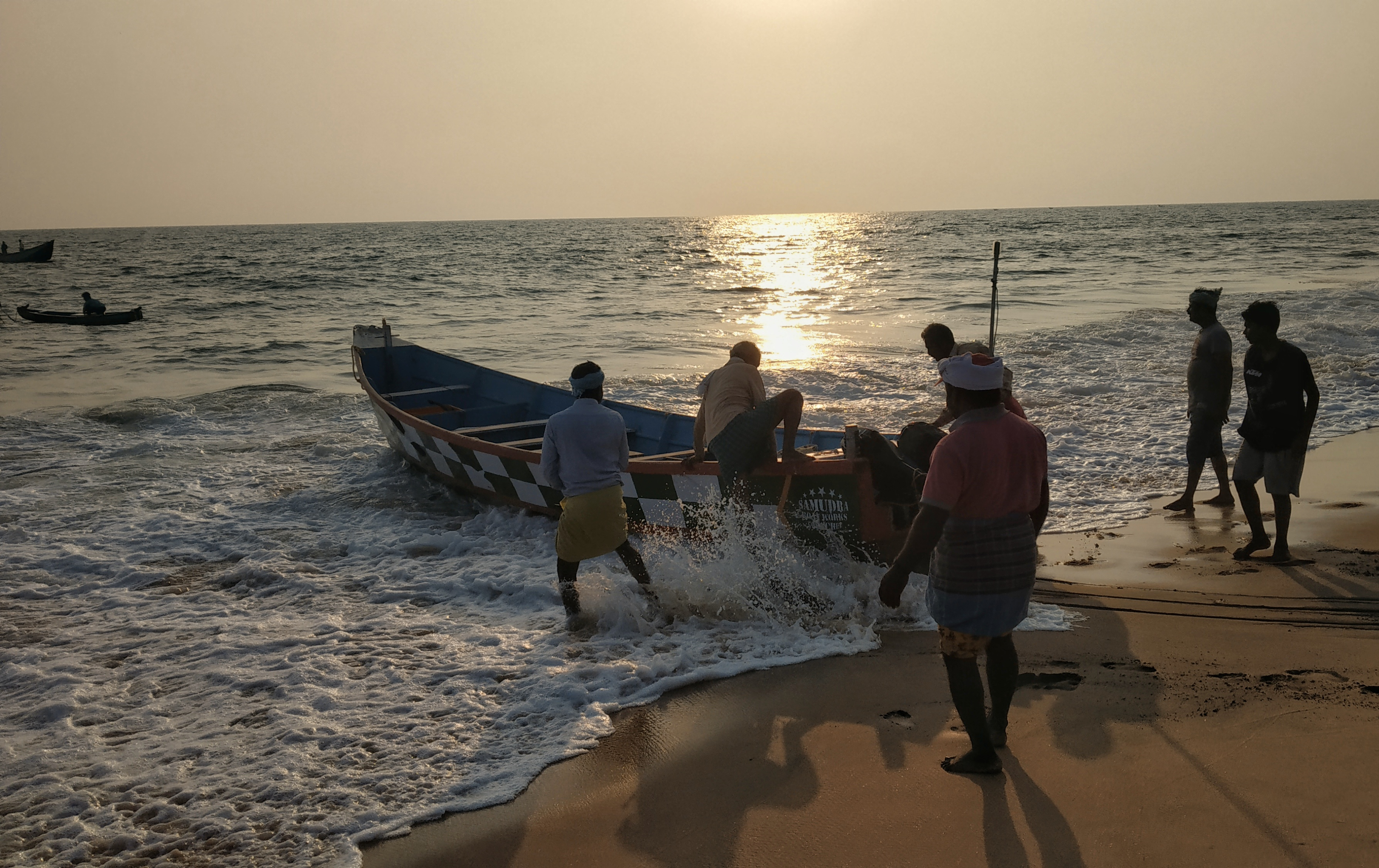
Beach view from Anchuthengu

Anchuthengu ("Five Coconut Palms"), formerly known as Anjengo, Angengo or Anjenga, is a coastal panchayath and town in the Thiruvananthapuram District of Kerala. It is situated 9 km south-west of Varkala Town along Trivandrum - Varkala - Kollam coastal highway.

The town contains old Dutch-style churches, a lighthouse, a 100-year-old convent and school, tombs of Dutch and British sailors and soldiers, and the remains of the Anchuthengu Fort. Kaikara village, the birthplace of the famous Malayalam poet Kumaran Asan, is located nearby. Temples in the area are Parambil Sree Bhadrakali Yogeeshwara Kshethram and Sree Bala Subrahmanya Swami Kshethram.

Anchuthengu is about 29 kilometers (18 mi) north of Thiruvananthapuram. The nearest airport is Thiruvananthapuram International Airport. Kadakkavur Railway Station is 2 kilometers (1.2 mi) away.

== History ==
Anjengo is located in an oxbow at the mouth of Parvathy Puthanaar canal. Originally, it was an old Dutch settlement between Kollam and Thiruvananthapuram, and near Varkala.

In 1694, the Queen of Attingal granted the British East India Company (EIC) the right to establish a factory and a fort at Anjengo, which became the company's first trade settlement in Kerala. The Anjengo Fort was erected in 1694–8. Because of its location, it was an occasional port of call for East Indiamen.

In 1728 Anjengo was the birthplace of Robert Orme (1728–1801), historiographer of the East India Company, and in 1744 of Eliza Draper who would become a muse and correspondent of Laurence Sterne. The fort played an important role in the Anglo-Mysore Wars of the 18th century but, by the 19th century, the fort was considered an unnecessary expense. The EIC abandoned it, and the factory, in 1813.

In the 19th century, the town remained known for its excellent ropes (manufactured from the local palms) and also exported pepper, homespun cotton cloth, and drugs. Anchuthengu was a part of Malabar District during British Raj.

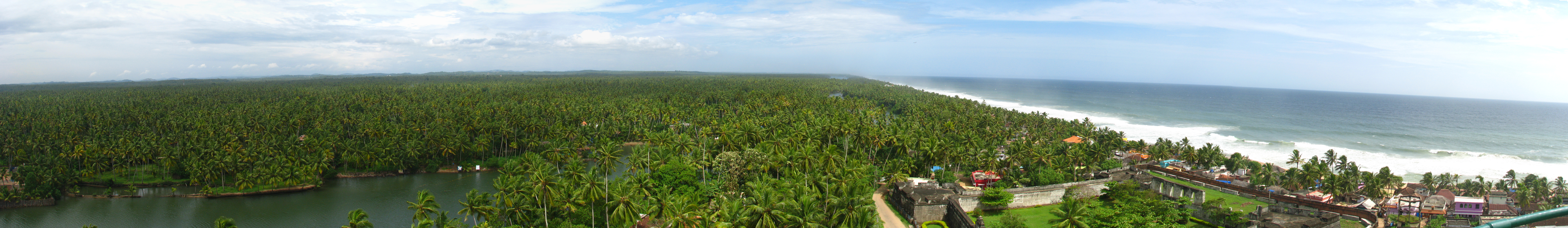
View of Anjuthengu from the light house

== See also ==
- Poothura
