= Kadakkavoor =

Village in Kerala, India

- Village
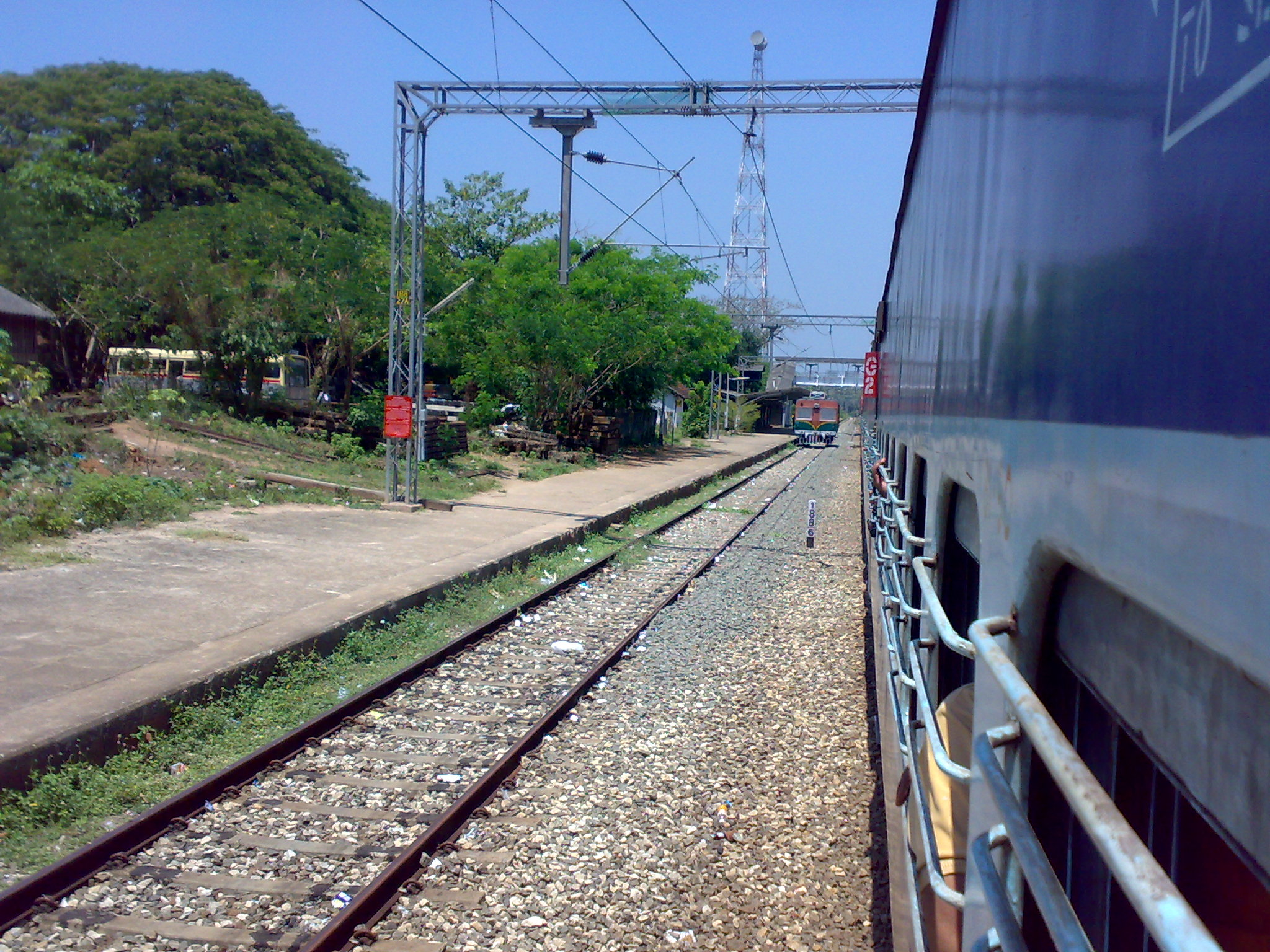
- Kadakkavoor railway station

- Location in Kerala, India Kadakkavoor (India)
- Coordinates: 8.6857°N 76.7557°E
- Country: India
- State: Kerala
- District: Thiruvananthapuram
- Taluk: Chirayinkeezhu

Government
  - Body: Kadakkavoor grama panchayat
  - President: Sheela S.

Population (2011)
  - Total: 22,632

Languages
  - Official: Malayalam, English
- Time zone: UTC+5:30 (IST)
- PIN: 695306
- Telephone code: 0470
- Vehicle registration: KL-16

Kadakkavoor (also spelled Kadakkavur) is a village in Chirayinkeezhu taluk, Thiruvananthapuram district, Kerala, India. It lies about 8 km north-west of Attingal, on the Thiruvananthapuram–Kollam section of the Southern Railway, and is a centre of the coir industry. The village forms a grama panchayat and had a population of 22,632 at the 2011 census. The coastal settlement of Anchuthengu was historically an enclave within Kadakkavoor.

== History ==
Anjengo (now Anchuthengu), the coastal site of an early European trading post, was historically an enclave within the village of Kadakkavoor. The Quilon–Trivandrum railway, on which Kadakkavoor lies, opened to traffic on 1 January 1918. The Trivandrum district's earliest registered trade union, the Chirayinkil Taluk Coir Workers' Union, was established at Vakkom in Kadakkavoor on 6 December 1940.

== Demographics ==
At the 2011 India census, Kadakkavoor had a population of 22,632 in 5,144 households, comprising 10,880 males and 11,752 females.

== Governance ==
Kadakkavoor is administered by the Kadakkavoor grama panchayat, which is divided into 16 wards. Following the 2020 local body elections, Sheela S. of the CPI(M) was elected panchayat president and Prakash R. vice-president.

Wards of Kadakkavoor grama panchayat
No.	Name	No.	Name
1	Melattingal	9	Oottuparambu
2	Sankaramangalam	10	Railway Station
3	Keezhattingal	11	Kadakkavur
4	Vilayilmoola	12	Nilakkamukku
5	Sasthamnada	13	Bhajanamadam
6	Thinavila	14	Mananakku
7	Ayikkudi	15	Perumkulam
8	Thekkumbhagam	16	Kalloorkonam

== Economy ==
Kadakkavoor is a centre of the coir industry, which processes fibre from coconut husk; coir, cotton weaving and oil pressing have historically been its main industries. The village has a service co-operative bank.

== Education and healthcare ==
Kadakkavoor has six primary schools, four middle schools, four secondary schools and two senior secondary schools; the nearest degree college lies 5–10 km away. The village has a primary health centre, a maternity and child welfare centre, a family welfare centre and an alternative-medicine hospital; the nearest community health centre is more than 10 km away.

== Transportation ==
Kadakkavoor is served by Kadakkavoor railway station on the Thiruvananthapuram–Kollam section of the Southern Railway. Land has been acquired for a railway over-bridge at the Kadakkavoor–Murukkumpuzha level crossing (LC No. 570).

== Landmarks ==
A shrine dedicated to Sastha stands by the shore of the Anchuthengu backwater. The village is also the site of the Daivapura temple, consecrated to Bhagavathi, where Ulakuda Perumal is honoured. The village also has a Roman Catholic church.
