= Chirayinkeezhu =

- Town
- ചിറയിൻകീഴ്
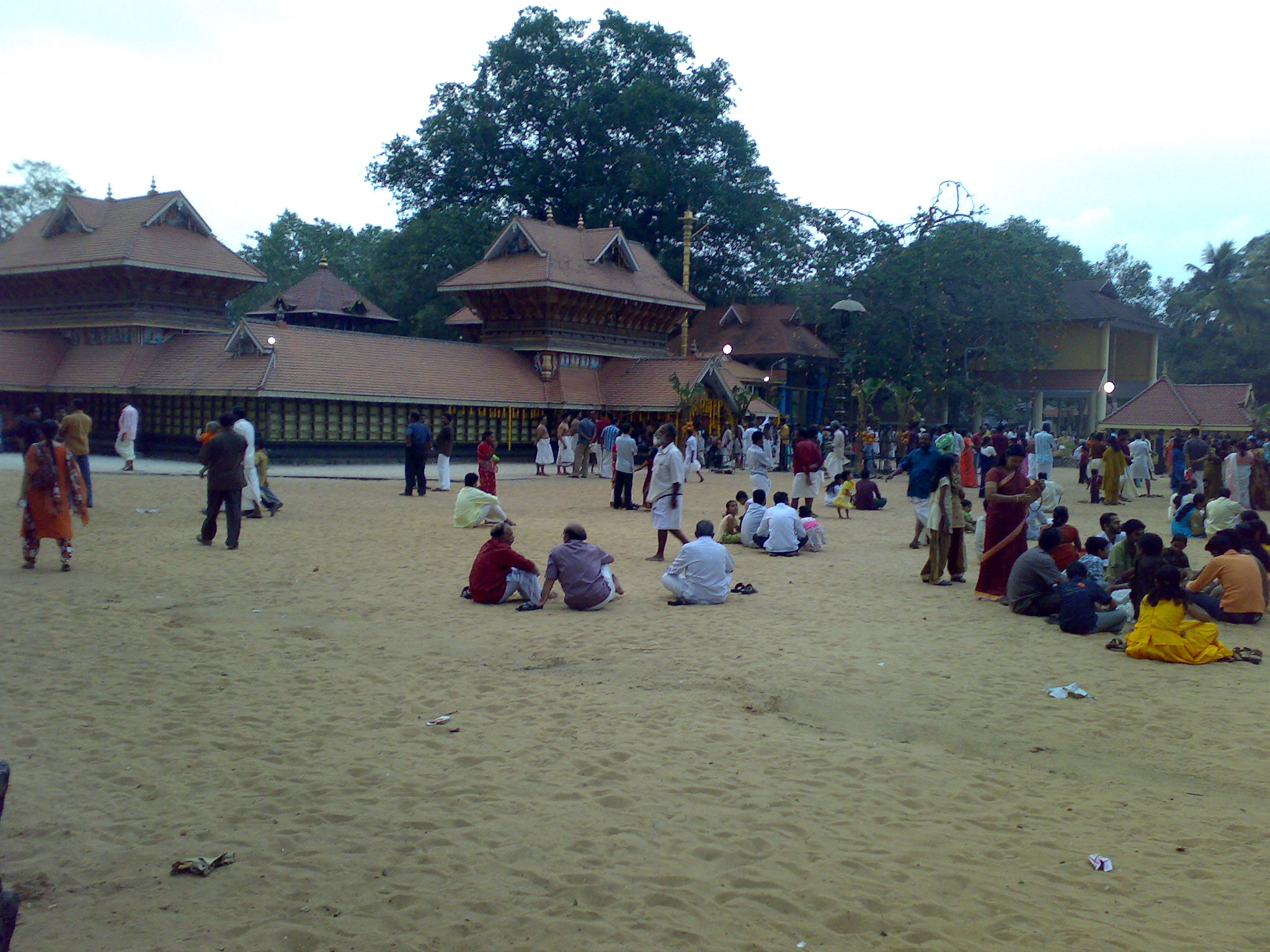
- Sarkara Devi Temple

- Location in Kerala, India Chirayinkeezhu (India)
- Coordinates: 8.70°N 76.82°E
- Country: India
- State: Kerala
- District: Thiruvananthapuram
- Taluk: Chirayinkeezhu

Government
  - Type: Panchayati raj (India)
  - Body: Gram panchayat

Area
  - Total: 15 km^{2} (5.8 sq mi)

Population
  - Total: 29,907
  - Density: 2,000/km^{2} (5,200/sq mi)

Languages
  - Official: Malayalam,
- Time zone: UTC+5:30 (IST)
- PIN: 695304
- Telephone code: 0470
- ISO 3166 code: IN-KL
- Vehicle registration: KL-16
- Nearest city: Thiruvananthapuram
- Lok Sabha constituency: Attingal
- Website: Official website

Chirayinkeezhu is a town in the Thiruvananthapuram district in the Indian state of Kerala. It was also the hometown of famous Malayalam film actor Prem Nazir. It is the seat of Chirayinkeezhu taluk. It has the famous bhadrakali temple Sarkara bhagavathi temple. It is surrounded by Attigal, Kadakkavour, Ayoor, Mudapuram. The Chirayinkeezhu Railway Station is situated here. The nearest airport is Thiruvananthapuram International Airport.

== Anjengo Fort ==
The well known Anjengo Fort (Anchutengu kotta) is on the way from Chirayinkil to Varkala via Kadakkavoor. Old Dutch-style churches, the lighthouse, a 100-year-old convent and school, tombs of Dutch and British sailors and soldiers, and the remains of the fort are major points of interest here. Anchuthengu has a beautiful and clean beach. Kaikara village, the birthplace of the famous Malayalam poet Kumaran Asan, is located nearby. In the past, post arrived through the Thiruvananthapuram-Kochi Canal at Anchal Kadavu to Pulimootil Kadavu Post Office.

== Transport ==
Chirayinkeezhu is located 28 kilometres (17 mi) north of Kerala's capital city Thiruvananthapuram. The nearest airport is Thiruvananthapuram International Airport. Chirayinkeezhu railway station is the nearest railway station. The town is 28 kilometres (17 mi) from Thiruvananthapuram Central Railway Station and 37 kilometres (23 mi) from Kollam Junction railway station. There are frequent regular private bus services connecting with Attingal, Kadakkavur and Varkala. Kerala Road Transport Corporation (KSRTC) operates daily bus services from Thiruvananthapuram, Perumathura and Pothencode amongst others.

More than ten express trains and all passing passenger trains stop at Chirayinkil railway station. It is on the Thriuvananthapuram-Kollam rail route. The Malabar Express, Guruvayoor-Chennai Egmore Express, Vanchinad Express, Venad Express Parasuram Express Island Express and Thiruvananthapuram-Kannur Express all pass through this station. Traveling south, Thiruvananthapuram Central Railway Station is the nearest major railhead. To the north, Varkala Sivagiri is the nearest main station.

== State Government Offices ==
- Chirayinkeezhu, Sub Registrar Office
- PWD, Buildings Section
- LSGD Office
- Panchayath Office
- Excise office
- Taluk Hospital

== See also ==
- Poothura
