= List of railway stations in Trivandrum =

This is the list of railway stations serving the district of Trivandrum in the Indian state of Kerala.

- Kappil Railway Station
- Edava Railway Station
- Varkala Railway Station
- Akathumuri railway station
- Kadakkavoor railway station
- Chirayinkeezhu railway station
- Perunguzhi Railway Station
- Murukkumpuzha Railway Station
- Kaniyapuram railway station
- Kazhakoottam railway station
- Veli Railway Station
- Thiruvananthapuram North railway station
- Thiruvananthapuram Pettah railway station
- Thiruvananthapuram Central
- Thiruvananthapuram South railway station
- Balaramapuram railway station
- Neyyattinkara railway station
- Amaravila Railway Station
- Dhanuvachapuram Railway Station
- Parassala Railway Station
