= Transport in Thiruvananthapuram =

The Indian city of Thiruvananthapuram has a well-developed transport infrastructure. The city and its suburbs may be traversed using road and rail. Within the city, city buses, taxis and auto rickshaws provide mobility. Scooters and motorcycles are the favored means of personal transport. Ola, Uber and other taxi services operate there.

== Road ==
National Highway 66 (old NH 47) passes through the city. Thiruvananthapuram can be accessed from the North South Corridor National Highway 44, via NH 544 (old NH-47) at Salem, and at Kochi via NH 66. It connects southern cities such as Kollam, Kochi, Thrissur, Palakkad, Coimbatore and Salem.

From the south NH 66 at Kanyakumari provides the North South Corridor (NH 44). It passes through Nagercoil.

The city is connected by state highways such as SH 1, SH 2 and SH 45. The Main Central Road (MC Road) is the arterial State Highway in Kerala. It starts from National Highway NH 47 at Kesavadasapuram in the city. It connects Angamaly through Kottayam with the capital city.

Mahatma Gandhi road is the major multi-lane arterial road which starts from East Fort (Kizhakke kotta) and ends near the LMS Church in the Museum road. The main wholesale business market of the city, Chalai Bazaar, Kerala Government Secretariat, Kerala University, University Stadium etc. are along this road. Another important road is the Kowdiar road, also known as the Royal Road, as it leads to Kowdiar Palace. The Kerala Lok Bhavan is also situated in this road.

The exponential growth of service and IT-based sectors coupled with its prominence as the state capital and tourist center has strained transport infrastructure. Mitigating projects include the construction of flyovers and underpasses. The first phase includes 42 km of six-lane and four-lane dual carriage ways. Although road construction is of a high standard, with appropriate marking and signage; a majority of Tier-II roads remain too narrow for the levels of traffic using them.

=== Bus ===
The Central City Bus Terminal is located at East Fort (Kizhakke kotta), near Padmanabha Swamy temple. Intra-city public transport is dominated by the state-owned KSRTC (Kerala State Road Transport Corporation). Private bus services are also available within the corporation limits. KSRTC city services operate from six depots: City depot, Vikas Bhavan, Peroorkada, Pappanamcode, Kaniyapuram and Vellanad. These services were revamped in 2005 with the introduction of modern buses and electronic ticketing.

KSRTC operates services of various classes like ordinary/Ananthapuri, City Fast, and Fast Passenger in the city. KSRTC's City Circular, City Shuttle and City Radial services are operated throughout the Thiruvananthapuram Metropolitan Area, connecting all the major outskirts of the city.

The Central bus station is located 1 km away from East Fort at Thampanoor, opposite to Thiruvananthapuram Central Railway Station. The terminal connects Thiruvananthapuram to the other parts of Kerala as well as to other states.

== Rail ==
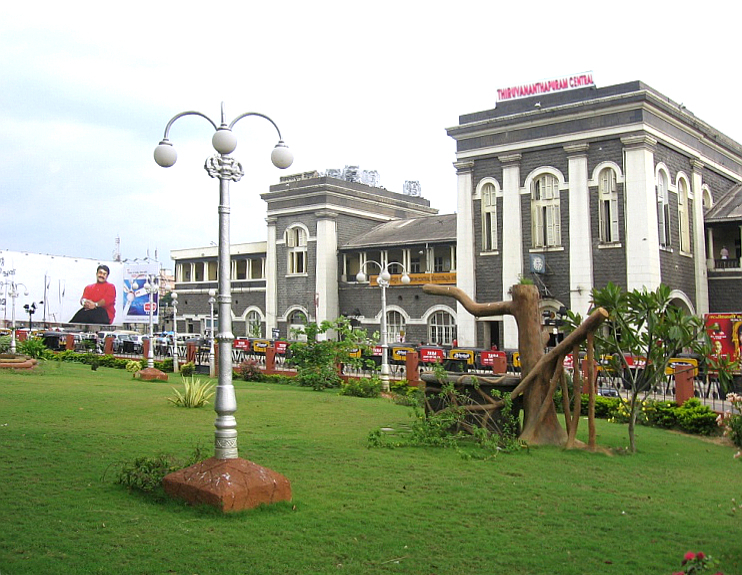
Trivandrum Central railway station

The Central railway station is located at Thampanoor, 8 km from the airport. Six railway stations operate within city limits, including Thiruvananthapuram central station and seven stations that serve the metropolitan area. Thiruvananthapuram Pettah, Thiruvananthapuram North railway station, Kazhakoottam and Veli Railway Stations are located towards the north and Thiruvananthapuram South railway station to the south within the city limits. Kaniyapuram, Murukkumpuzha, Perunguzhi, Chirayinkeezhu, Kadakkavur towards north and Balaramapuram and Neyyattinkara railway stations towards south serves the metropolitan area.

The city is connected by rail to almost all the major cities like Delhi, Mumbai, Chennai, Bengaluru, Hyderabad, Pune, Madurai, Coimbatore, Trichy etc. on daily basis, while cities like Amritsar, Chandigarh, Dehradun, Ahmedabad, Kanpur, Jammu, Dibrugarh, Lucknow, Bilaspur, Indore, Howrah and Guwahati on weekly/bi/tri weekly basis. Thiruvananthapuram North railway station is a satellite station developed to ease the congestion at Thiruvananthapuram Central. Thiruvananthapuram is the first major South Indian city on the longest train route towards North in India, Kanyakumari to Dibrugarh.

There is also a proposal to convert Thiruvananthapuram South railway station into a second satellite terminal station for Thiruvananthapuram Central with more pit lines and a maintenance yard.

== Air ==
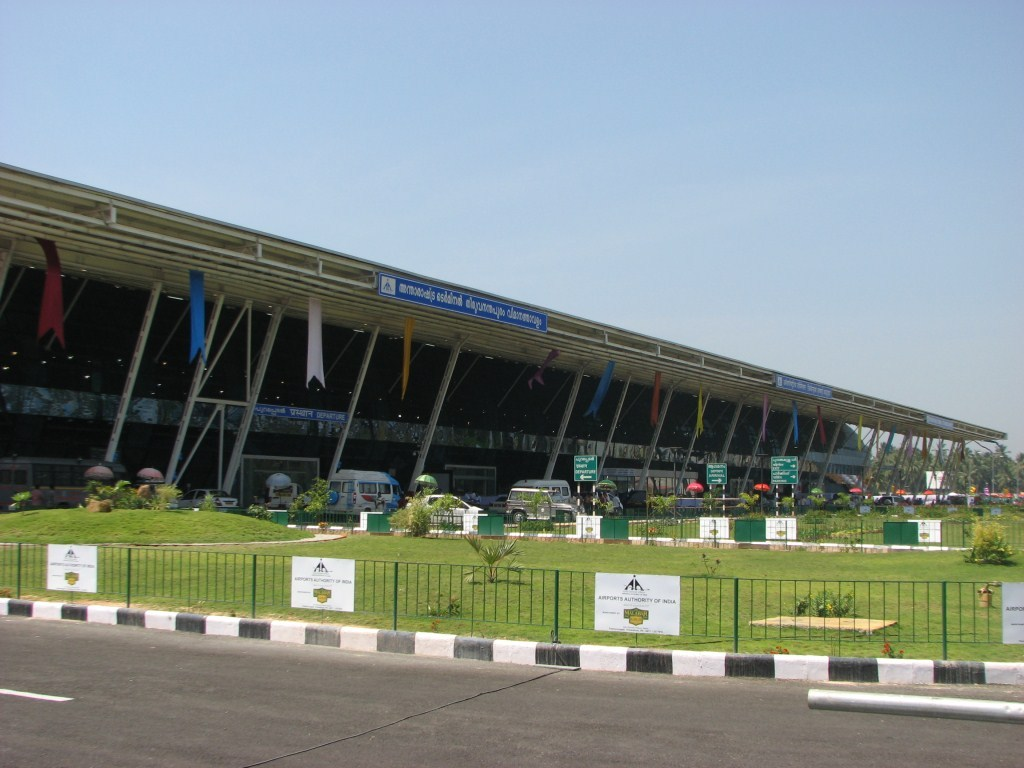
Terminal 2 entrance of Thiruvananthapuram International Airport

The Baggage Carousel of Terminal 2

Thiruvananthapuram International Airport offers direct flights to the Middle East, Singapore, Malaysia, Maldives and Sri Lanka.

The airport is approximately 3.7 kilometres (2.3 mi) due west from the city center. Apart from scheduled flights, many chartered flights from Europe operate during tourist season (around December).

Thiruvananthapuram International Airport is the southernmost airport in India and the closest to neighboring countries such as Sri Lanka and Maldives.

== Port ==
India's first deep water Transshipment terminal Vizhinjam International Seaport Thiruvananthapuram is located in Thiruvananthapuram. The natural sea depth facilitates the maintenance of deep draft with limited dredging. It is one of the deepest ports in India. It is in close proximity to the international shipping lanes between Europe and the Far East.
