= Thiruvananthapuram North–Yesvantpur Garib Rath Express =

Train in India

Thiruvananthapuram North - Yesvantpur Junction Garib Rath Superfast Express
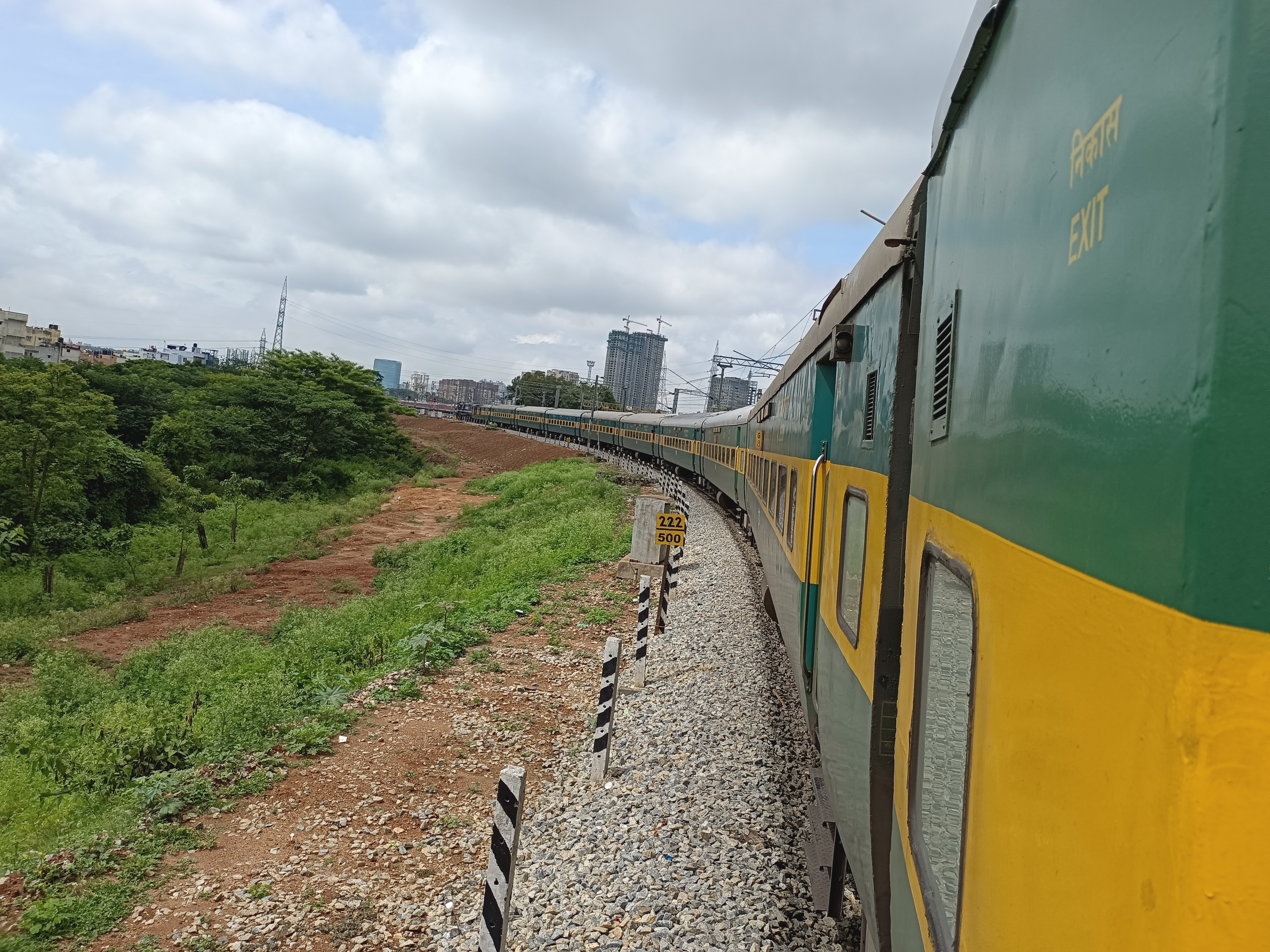

Overview
- Service type: Garib Rath Express
- First service: 24 February 2009; 17 years ago
- Current operator: South Western Railway

Route
- Termini: Yesvantpur (YPR); Thiruvananthapuram North (TVCN)
- Stops: 17
- Distance travelled: 801 km (498 mi)
- Average journey time: 16 hours 15 minutes
- Service frequency: 3 days a week.
- Train number: 12257 / 12258

On-board services
- Class: AC 3 tier Economy
- Seating arrangements: No
- Sleeping arrangements: Yes
- Auto-rack arrangements: YES
- Catering facilities: E-catering
- Observation facilities: Large windows
- Baggage facilities: Available
- Other facilities: Below the seats

Technical
- Rolling stock: LHB coach (from 18/6/2024)
- Track gauge: 1,676 mm (5 ft 6 in)
- Electrification: Yes
- Operating speed: 130 km/h (81 mph) maximum, 58 km/h (36 mph) average including halts.

The 12257 / 12258 Thiruvananthapuram North–Yesvantpur Garib Rath Express is a Superfast Garib Rath Express. The service was introduced in 2005 by Indian railway minister Lalu Prasad Yadav. It is an air conditioned Express train that can run at the same speed as Rajdhani Express or Shatabdi Express. The Express also offers inexpensive ticket fares compared to other premium trains. It is also faster than other express trains.

Thiruvananthapuram North is the satellite terminal station of the Express in Thiruvananthapuram, capital city of Kerala and Yeshvantpur is a satellite terminal located in an industrial-cum-residential area in the north western part of Bangalore City, capital of Karnataka. It is operated by the South Western Railway Zone. It runs on a single line from Baiyappanahalli (Bangalore) to Salem, and on a double line from Salem to Thiruvananthapuram North.

== About Garib Rath Express ==
The Garib Rath (literally: "Poor Man's Chariot") is a no-frills air-conditioned train started by the Indian Railways in 2005 to provide cheaper air-conditioned travels to passengers who cannot afford normal fares of air conditioned class in normal trains. As the fares are less than two-thirds of the fares for air conditioned classes in other trains, the distance between each seat or berth is less, the seats and berths are narrower and each coach has more seats and berths than in air-conditioned coaches in other trains. Only seating and three-tier (83 seats) accommodation is provided in Garib Rath. The passengers are not provided free bedding or food. The maximum speed of Garib Rath trains is around 130 kmph, nearly the same as Rajdhani's top speed.

== Engine used ==
before electrified route stretch, this train used to run with WDP-4D and WDM-3A during ICF rake still active.Since the route is completely electrified, it is hauled by a Krishnarajapuram(KJM) shed WAP-7.

== Coaches ==
The Thiruvananthapuram North–Yesvantpur Garib Rath Express runs using an LHB rake (earlier was ICF rake) and has 16 AC 3 tier economy coaches. It does not have AC Chair Car coaches like some Garib Rath trains. The number of coaches on the train is increased / decreased as per demand. There is no pantry car but catering is arranged on board the train. Since ICF Garib Rath rake was cancelled run now they upgraded with LHB coaches

== Coach position ==
Coach position for 12257 Yesvantpur - Thiruvananthapuram North Garib Rath Express

Loco	1	2	3	4	5	6	7	8	9	10	11	12	13	14	15	16	17	19
	EOG	G16	G15	G14	G13	G12	G11	G10	G9	G8	G7	G6	G5	G4	G3	G2	G1	EOG

Coach position for 12258 Thiruvananthapuram North - Yesvantpur Garib Rath Express

Loco	1	2	3	4	5	6	7	8	9	10	11	12	13	14	15	16	17	19
	EOG	G1	G2	G3	G4	G5	G6	G7	G8	G9	G10	G11	B12	G13	G14	G15	G16	EOG

== Schedule ==
Train Number - (12258) YESVANTPUR GR ( Thiruvananthapuram North to YESVANTPUR ) runs on Monday, Wednesday & Friday
SNo	Station Code	Station Name	Arrival Time	Departure Time	Halt Time(In minutes)	Distance	Day
1	KCVL	Thiruvananthapuram North	17:00	--	0	1	
2	QLN	KOLLAM JN	17:50	17:55	05:00	59	1
3	KYJ	KAYAMKULAM JN	18:40	18:42	02:00	100	1
4	MVLK	MAVELIKARA	18:52	18:53	01:00	107	1
5	CNGR	CHENGANNUR	19:04	19:05	01:00	120	1
6	TRVL	THIRUVALLA	19:15	19:16	01:00	127	1
7	CGY	CHANGANASERI	19:26	19:27	01:00	137	1
8	KTYM	KOTTAYAM	19:57	20:00	03:00	155	1
9	ERN	ERNAKULAM TOWN	21:20	21:25	05:00	217	1
10	AWY	ALUVA	21:48	21:50	02:00	234	1
11	TCR	THRISSUR	22:40	22:43	03:00	288	1
12	PGT	PALAKKAD JN	00:10	00:15	05:00	365	2
13	CBE	COIMBATORE JN	01:37	01:40	03:00	420	2
14	ED	ERODE JN	03:10	03:15	05:00	520	2
15	SA	SALEM JN	04:12	04:15	03:00	583	2
16	DPJ	DHARMAPURI	05:58	06:00	02:00	649	2
17	HSRA	HOSUR	07:28	07:30	02:00	741	2
18	BAND	BANASWADI	08:28	08:30	02:00	793	2
19	YPR	YESVANTPUR JN	09:45	--	--	808	2

Train Number - (12257) Thiruvananthapuram North GR (YESVANTPUR JN to Thiruvananthapuram North ) runs on Tuesday, Thursday & Sunday
SNo	Station Code	Station Name	Arrival Time	Departure Time	Halt Time(In minutes)	Distance	Day
1	YPR	YESVANTPUR JN	--	20:45	--	0	1
2	BAND	BANASWADI	21:32	21:33	02:00	15	1
3	HSRA	HOSUR	22:15	22:16	02:00	67	1
4	DPJ	DHARMAPURI	23:33	23:35	02:00	159	1
5	SA	SALEM JN	01:18	01:20	02:00	225	2
6	ED	ERODE JN	02:17	02:20	03:00	288	2
7	CBE	COIMBATORE JN	03:57	04:00	03:00	388	2
8	PGT	PALAKKAD JN	05:05	05:10	05:00	443	2
9	TCR	THRISSUR	06:35	06:37	03:00	520	2
10	AWY	ALUVA	07:48	07:50	02:00	574	2
11	ERN	ERNAKULAM TOWN	08:27	08:30	03:00	591	2
12	KTYM	KOTTAYAM	09:40	09:42	02:00	647	2
13	CGY	CHANGANASERI	10:02	10:03	01:00	665	2
14	TRVL	THIRUVALLA	10:12	10:13	01:00	673	2
15	CNGR	CHENGANNUR	10:24	10:25	01:00	688	2
16	MVLK	MAVELIKARA	10:35	10:36	01:00	701	2
17	KYJ	KAYAMKULAM JN	10:50	10:52	02:00	708	2
18	QLN	KOLLAM JN	11:20	11:25	05:00	749	2
19	KCVL	Thiruvananthapuram North	13:20	--	--	808	2

== See also ==
- Mysuru–Kochuveli Express
- Kochuveli-SMVT Bengaluru Humsafar Express
- Yesvantpur–Kochuveli AC Express
