= Mysuru–Thiruvananthapuram North Express =

Train in India

Mysuru Junction –Thiruvananthapuram North Express
Overview
- Service type: Express
- Locale: Kerala, Tamilnadu, Andhra Pradesh, Karnataka
- First service: 1 January 1996; 30 years ago
- Current operator: Southern Railway zone
- Ridership: Trivandrum division, Southern railway

Route
- Termini: Mysore Junction (MYS); Thiruvananthapuram North (TVCN)
- Stops: 24
- Distance travelled: 966 km (600 mi)
- Average journey time: 18 hours 35 minutes
- Service frequency: Daily (Note: Runs seven days in a week for every direction.)
- Train number: 16315 / 16316

On-board services
- Classes: AC Three tier Economy,AC 2 tier, AC 3 tier, Sleeper class, General Unreserved
- Seating arrangements: No
- Sleeping arrangements: Yes
- Catering facilities: On-board catering, E-catering
- Observation facilities: Large windows
- Entertainment facilities: No
- Baggage facilities: No
- Other facilities: Below the seats

Technical
- Rolling stock: LHB coach
- Track gauge: 1,676 mm (5 ft 6 in)
- Electrification: Yes
- Operating speed: 51 km/h (32 mph) average including halts.

The 16315 / 16316 Mysuru–Thiruvananthapuram North Express is an Express train belonging to Southern Railway zone that runs between Mysore Junction and Thiruvananthapuram North of Thiruvananthapuram the capital of Kerala in India. It is currently being operated with 16315/16316 train numbers on a daily basis. The train was extended from Bangalore City to Mysore Junction w.e.f. from 29 September 2019. This train was introduced as a result of many protests by Kerala passengers for a second train between Trivandum and Bangalore. This train is the successor of the "Trivandum Central Bangalore Weekly express".

== Service ==
The 16315 Mysore–Thiruvananthapuram North Express (Previously also known as KOCHUVELI Express) has an average speed of 46 km/h and covers 961 km in 20 hours 45 minutes. The 16316 Thiruvananthapuram North–Mysore Express has an average speed of 52 km/h and covers 961 km in 18 hours 35 minutes.

== Route and halts ==
The important halts of the train are:

- Mysore Junction
- Mandya
- Maddur
- Ramanagaram
- Kengeri
- KSR Bengaluru
- Bengaluru Cantonment
- Krishnarajapuram
- Bangarapet Junction
- Kuppam
- Tiruppattur
- Salem Junction
- Erode Junction
- Tiruppur
- Coimbatore Junction
- Palakkad Junction
- Thrissur
- Aluva
- Ernakulam Junction
- Cherthala
- Alappuzha
- Ambalappuzha
- Haripad
- Kayamkulam Junction
- Kollam Junction
- Thiruvananthapuram North

== Coach composition ==
The train has LHB rakes with a maximum permissible speed of 130 km/h. The train consists of 24 coaches:

- 3 AC Three tier Economy
- 1 AC II Tier
- 3 AC III Tier
- 13 Sleeper coaches
- 3 General Unreserved
- 2 EOG

LHB rakes are allotted with effect from 28-07-2018. India Rail Info

== Traction ==
Both trains are hauled by Royapuram-based WAP-7 electric locomotives from Mysore Junction to Thiruvananthapuram North, and vice versa.

== Timetable ==
- 16315 – Starts from Mysore daily at 12:45 hrs IST and reaches Thiruvananthapuram North next day at 9:15 AM IST
- 16316 – Starts from Thiruvananthapuram North daily at 16:45 hrs IST and reaches Mysore next day at 11:15 Hrs IST

== See also ==
- Yesvantpur–Kochuveli AC Express
- Kochuveli–Yesvantpur Garib Rath Express
- Kochuveli–SMVT Bengaluru Humsafar Express
