= Thiruvananthapuram North–SMVT Bengaluru Humsafar Express =

Train in India

Overview
- Service type: Humsafar Express
- First service: 20 October 2018; 7 years ago
- Current operator: Southern Railways

Route
- Termini: Thiruvananthapuram North (TVCN); Sir M. Visvesaraya Terminal, Bengaluru (SMVB)
- Stops: 12
- Distance travelled: 826 km (513 mi)
- Average journey time: 16h 40m
- Service frequency: Bi-weekly
- Train number: 16319 / 16320

On-board services
- Class: AC 3 tier
- Seating arrangements: No
- Sleeping arrangements: Yes
- Catering facilities: Available
- Observation facilities: Large windows
- Baggage facilities: Yes

Technical
- Rolling stock: LHB Humsafar
- Track gauge: 1,676 mm (5 ft 6 in)
- Operating speed: 50 km/h (31 mph) Avg. Speed

The 16319/16320 Thiruvananthapuram North - SMVT Bengaluru Humsafar Express is an express train of the Indian Railways connecting Thiruvananthapuram North in Kerala and SMVT in Karnataka. It is currently being operated with 16319/16320 train numbers on bi-weekly basis.

== Coach composition ==
The train was designed by Indian Railways. It runs with a composition of 16 AC 3-tier and 2 Second class sleeper coaches.The train has standard LHB Modern High Speed rake with unique Humsafar Livery It includes a LED screen which shows passengers information about other stations and other information. An announcement system for the train is expected to be implemented in the future.

== Service ==
It averages 50 km/h as 16319/Kochuveli - SMVT Humsafar Express starts on Thursday and Saturday from Thiruvananthapuram North covering 828 km in 16 h 40 m & 59 km/h as 16320/SMVT - Kochuveli Humsafar Express starts on Sunday and Friday from Sir M. Visvesaraya Terminal, Bengaluru covering 826 km in 14 h 05 m.

== Timing ==
Train Number	Station Code	Departure Station	Departure Time	Departure Day	Arrival Station	Arrival Time	Arrival Day
16319	TVCN	Thiruvananthapuram North	5:30 PM	Thursday, Saturday	SMVT Bengaluru	10:00 AM	Friday, Sunday
16320	SMVB	SMVT Bengaluru	7:00 PM	Sunday, Friday	Thiruvananthapuram North	10:00 AM	Monday, Saturday

== Coach position ==
Coach position for 16319 Thiruvananthapuram North-SMVT Bengaluru Humsafar Express

Loco	1	2	3	4	5	6	7	8	9	10	11	12	13	14	15	16	17	19	20	21
	EOG	S1	S2	B1	B2	B3	B4	B5	B6	B7	B8	B9	B10	B11	B12	B13	B14	B15	B16	EOG

Coach position for 16320 SMVT Bengaluru-Thiruvananthapuram North Humsafar Express

Loco	1	2	3	4	5	6	7	8	9	10	11	12	13	14	15	16	17	19	20	21
	EOG	B16	B15	B14	B13	B12	B11	B10	B9	B8	B7	B6	B5	B4	B3	B2	B1	S2	S1	EOG

== Traction ==
Both trains are hauled by a Royapuram / Erode based WAP 7 (HOG) equipped locomotive on its entire journey.

== Route and halts ==
- Thiruvananthapuram North
- Kollam Junction
- Chengannur
- Kottayam
- Ernakulam Town
- Thrissur
- Palakkad Junction
- Coimbatore Junction
- Erode Junction
- Salem Junction
- Bangarapet Junction
- Krishnarajapuram
- Sir M. Visvesaraya Terminal, Bengaluru

== See also ==
- Kochuveli railway station
- Kochuveli Yesvantpur Garib Rath Express
- Mysuru Junction–Kochuveli Express
- Yesvantpur–Kochuveli AC Express
