= Andoorkonam =

- Village
- Location in India Andoorkonam (India)
- Coordinates: 8°35′49″N 76°51′59″E
- Country: India
- State: Kerala
- District: Thiruvananthapuram
- Taluk: Thiruvananthapuram

Population (2011)
  - Total: 15,557
- Time zone: UTC+5:30 (IST)
- Postal code: 695584
- Vehicle Code Range: KL-22, KL-01

Andoorkonam is a village and gram panchayat Near Kaniyapuram in Thiruvananthapuram Taluk in the Indian state of Kerala.

It is located approximately 20 km from the Thiruvananthapuram Central Railway Station. Andoorkonam is noted for its reserves of Kaolinite (china clay). The temple of Sree Ramadasa Ashram is nearby.

== Demographics ==
As of the 2011 Indian census, Andoorkonam had a population of 15,557 with 7,488 males and 8,069 females.

== Geography ==
The Village is surrounded by Pallippuram Village to the west, Iroopara Village to the east, and Kazhakoottam Village to the south.
