= Thiruvananthapuram Pettah railway station =

Railway station in Kerala, India

Thiruvananthapuram Pettah Trivandrum Pettah

General information
- Location: Thiruvananthapuram, Kerala; India
- Coordinates: 8.495°N 76.932°E
- Elevation: 18 metres (59 ft)
- System: Indian Railways station
- Operator: Indian Railways
- Line: Kollam–Thiruvananthapuram trunk line
- Platforms: 2
- Tracks: 2

Construction
- Structure type: at-grade
- Parking: Limited surface parking

Other information
- Status: Active
- Station code: TVP
- Zone(s): Southern Railway zone
- Division(s): Thiruvananthapuram
Route map
Location
- Location within India Location within Kerala

Thiruvananthapuram Pettah railway station (station code: TVP) is an NSG–6 category Indian railway station in the Thiruvananthapuram railway division of the Southern Railway zone [1]. It is a railway station for intercity trains, located at Thiruvananthapuram, in the Indian state of Kerala [2]. The station is only 2.5 kilometres (1.6 mi) from the Thiruvananthapuram Central station. Most incoming trains from the Kollam direction (from the north) halt here for the convenience of passengers in the general area and to reduce the crowd at Thiruvananthapuram Central. But very few outgoing trains to the north have a halt at Pettah.

== See also ==
- Transport in Thiruvananthapuram
- Kochuveli railway station
- Kazhakoottam railway station
- Pettah
- Nemom railway station
