= Pallippuram, Thiruvananthapuram =

Pallippuram
- suburb
- Location in Kerala, India Pallippuram (India)
- Coordinates: 8°36′0″N 76°51′0″E
- Country: India
- State: Kerala
- District: Thiruvananthapuram

Languages
  - Official: Malayalam, English
- Time zone: UTC+5:30 (IST)
- PIN: 695316
- Vehicle registration: KL- 22, KL- 01
- Coastline: 0 kilometres (0 mi)

Pallippuram is a northern suburb of Thiruvananthapuram city of Thiruvananthapuram district, Kerala. It is one of the fastest urbanising area of the Thiruvananthapuram UA.Technocity is situated in this area.

== Geography ==
It is located at 8°36′0″N 76°51′0″E.

== Location ==
Pallippuram is located on National Highway 66, 4 km north of Kazhakkoottam and 16.5 km north Of Thiruvananthapuram International Airport

Nearest airport is Thiruvananthapuram International Airport and nearest major railway station is Thiruvananthapuram Central. It is well connected to Thiruvananthapuram city by state road transport buses.

== CRPF Group Centre ==
The Central Reserve Police Force has a group centre located at Pallippuram with a training intake capacity of 1,000 men. It acts as the major administrative and operational headquarters for multiple battalions in the region.
