= Kazhakoottam flyover =

Flyover in Kerala

- കഴക്കൂട്ടം മേൽപ്പാലം
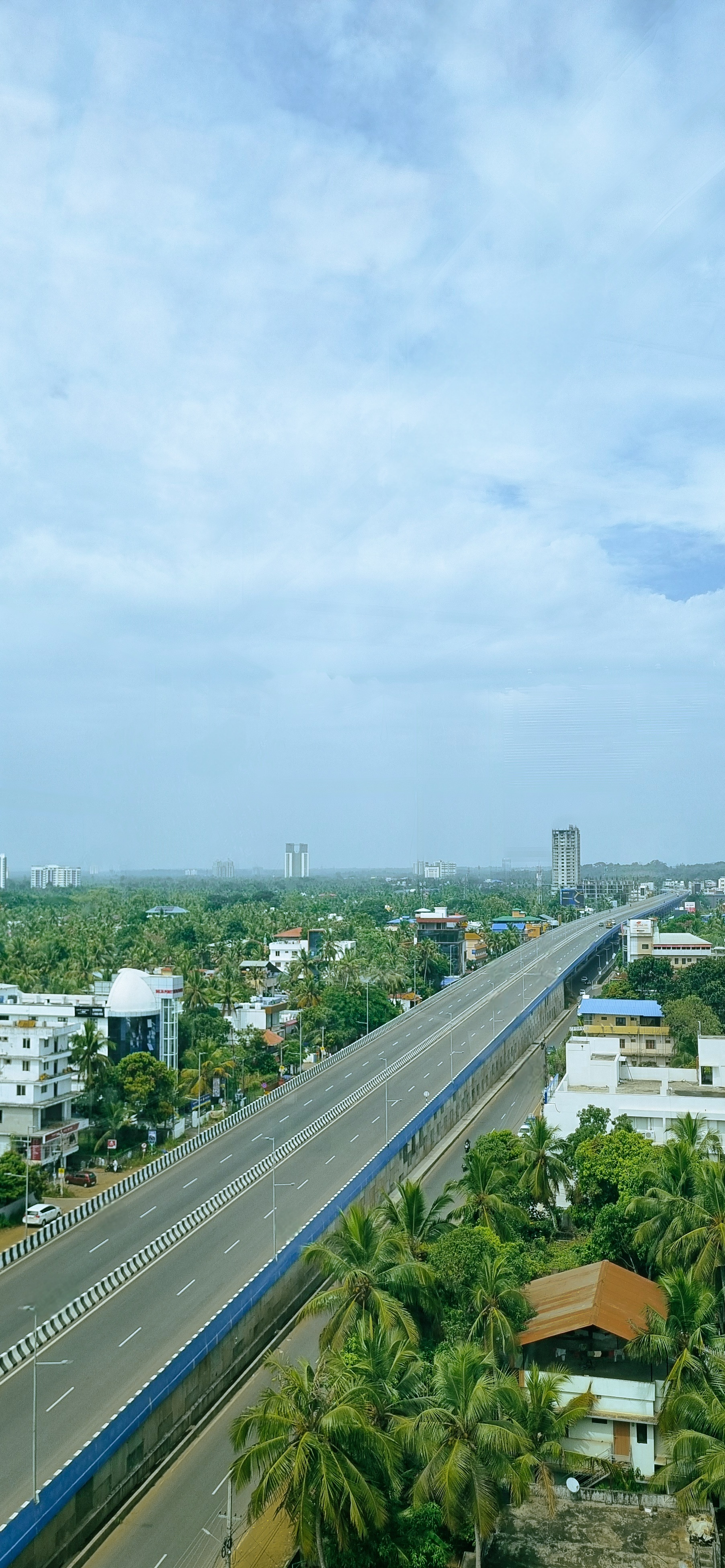

Route information
- Maintained by NHAI
- Length: 2.4 km (1.5 mi)
- Existed: 3 December 2022–present

Major junctions
- South end: Techno Park, phase 3
- North end: Kazhakoottam

Location
- Country: India
- Major cities: Thiruvananthapuram

Highway system
- Roads in India; Expressways; National; State; Asian

Kazhakoottam flyover is a flyover, that is a part of the NH 66 in Kerala, India. The 2.7 km long four line flyover is the longest elevated highway in Kerala. The flyover runs above the Kazhakootam junction, where the original national highway intersects with the bypass road. Vehicles travelling from Kollam can enter the elevated highway near the CSI Mission Hospital in Kazhakootam.

== Overview ==
The flyover is 22 metres wide and contains 61 pillars and 420 girders. Its development began in December 2018 at a cost of Rs 195.5 crore and the construction was supposed to be finished in two years. It starts from CSI Mission Hospital at Kazhakkoottam to Techno Park phase-III. The construction of the flyover started with the announcement that it would be open to public in two years. But it got delayed due to many reasons including the COVID lockdown. Originally, the flyover was scheduled to open on 1 November 2022. It was later moved to 15 November and again to 29 November. The inauguration date was again postponed to 2 December and the venue was decided. However the inauguration was cancelled due to the unavailability of Union minister Nitin Gadkari. As the protests intensified, the National Highways Authority of India opened the flyover unofficially to public on 3 December and official inauguration was postponed to 15 December.
