= Kazhakuttam railway station =

Railway station in Kerala, India

Kazhakoottam
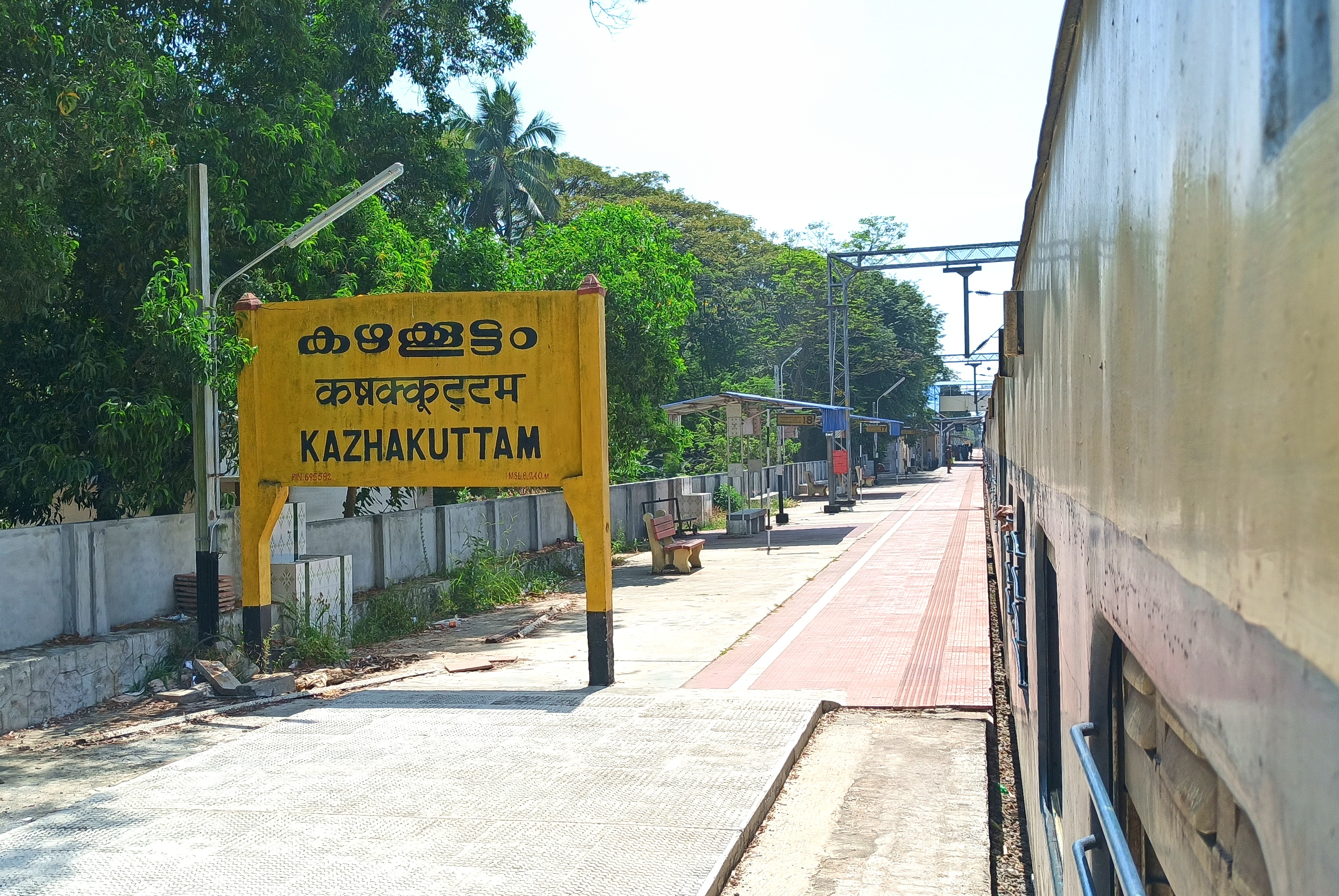

General information
- Location: Kazhakoottam, Thiruvananthapuram, Thiruvananthapuram district, Kerala; India
- Coordinates: 8.556°N 76.872°E
- Elevation: 16 m (52 ft)
- System: Indian Railways station
- Line: Kollam–Thiruvananthapuram trunk line
- Platforms: 3
- Tracks: 4

Construction
- Structure type: Standard (on-ground station)
- Accessible: Disabled access

Other information
- Status: Functioning
- Station code: KZK
- Zone(s): Southern Railway zone
- Division(s): Thiruvananthapuram
Route map
Location
- Location within India Location within Kerala

Kazhakuttam railway station (station code: KZK) is an NSG–5 category Indian railway station in Thiruvananthapuram railway division of Southern Railway zone. It is one of the 5 railway stations serving the Indian city of Thiruvananthapuram, the capital of the state of Kerala. It lies on the Kollam–Thiruvananthapuram rail line. Kazhakuttam is currently the 4th-most revenue generating railway station in Thiruvananthapuram district. The station falls under the Thiruvananthapuram railway division of the Southern Railway Zone, Indian Railways. Kaniyapuram and Veli railway stations are the nearby stations on the north and south, respectively.

== Significance ==
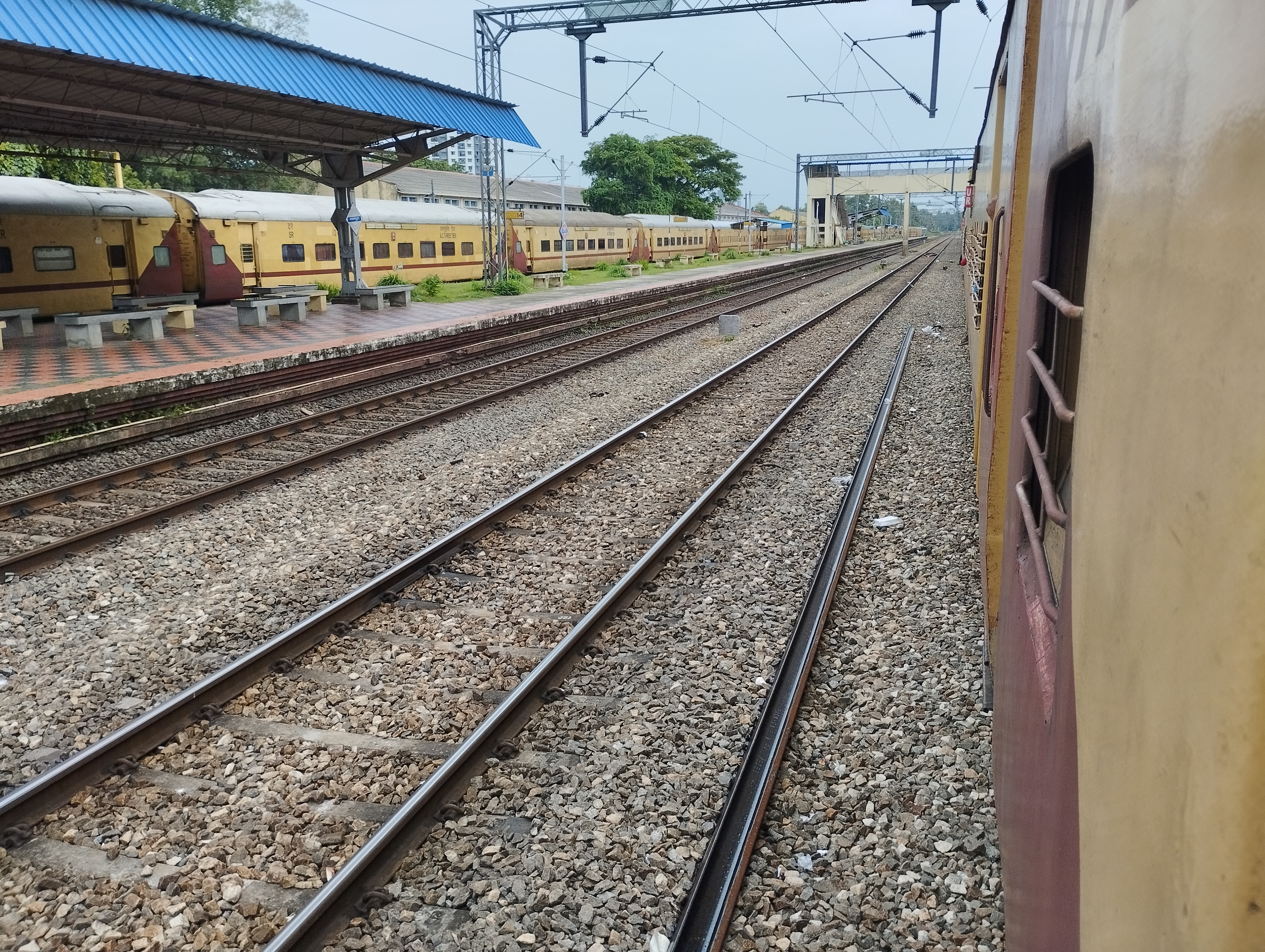
Kazhakuttam railway station

It is located at Kazhakoottam, which is significant for its proximity to the IT hub of the state Technopark, Sainik School, Kinfra Film and Video Park, Vikram Sarabhai Space Centre, DCSMAT media school, PRASAD film lab, Vismayas Max. Employees of Technopark and VSSC hugely rely on this station. Food Corporation of India godown is also situated in the railway station premises.

== Layout ==
The station has currently three platforms. Recently, a basic food kiosk has been also added. A high-resolution, LED-based integrated passenger information system has been introduced at Thiruvananthapuram Central, Kollam, Ernakulam Jn and Thrissur, and will soon be introduced at Kazhakkoottam.

== Services ==
Some of the trains stopping at the station:

Express trains

No.	Train no	Origin	Destination	Train name
1.	16629/16630	Thiruvananthapuram Central	Mangalore Central	Malabar Express
2.	16303/16304	Thiruvananthapuram Central	Ernakulam Junction	Vanchinad Express
3.	16649/16650	Nagercoil Junction	Mangalore Central	Parasuram Express
4.	12697/12698	Chennai Central	Thiruvanananthapuram Central	Chennai–Thiruvananthapuram Express
5.	16525/16526	Bangalore City	Kanyakumari	Island Express

Passenger Trains

Sl No.	Train number	Source	Destination	Name/Type
1	56307	Kollam Junction	Thiruvananthapuram Central	Passenger
2	56700	Madurai	Punalur	Passenger
3	66304	Kollam Junction	Kanyakumari	MEMU
4	56309	Kollam Junction	Thiruvananthapuram Central	Passenger
5	56304	Nagercoil	Kottayam	Passenger
6	56701	Punalur	Madurai	Passenger
7	56715	Punalur	Kanniyakumari	Passenger
8	56716	Kanniyakumari	Punalur	Passenger
9	66305	Kanyakumari	Kollam Junction	MEMU
10	56308	Thiruvananthapuram Central	Kollam Junction	Passenger

== See also ==
- Thiruvananthapuram Central
- Kochuveli railway station
