= Thampanoor =

- Neighbourhood
- Location in Kerala Location in India
- Coordinates: 08°26′25″N 76°55′25″E
- Country: India
- State: Kerala
- District: Thiruvananthapuram
- Talukas: Thiruvananthapuram

Government
  - Type: Municipal Corporation
  - Body: Thiruvananthapuram Municipal Corporation
  - Councillor: Harikumar

Languages
  - Official: Malayalam, English
- Time zone: UTC+5:30 (IST)
- Telephone code: 0471
- Vehicle registration: KL-01
- Coastline: 0 kilometres (0 mi)
- Climate: Tropical monsoon (Köppen)
- Avg. summer temperature: 35 °C (95 °F)
- Avg. winter temperature: 20 °C (68 °F)

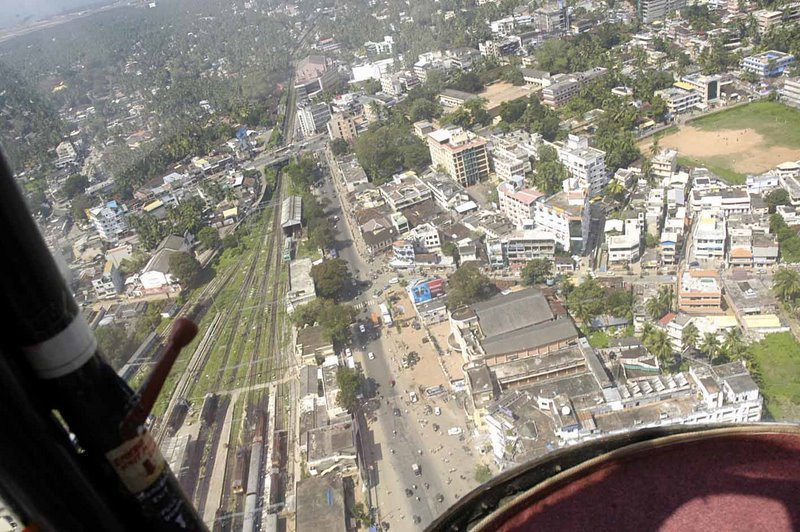
Aerial view of Thampanoor, towards the north

Thampanoor is the geographic center (CBD) of the Indian city of Thiruvananthapuram. The busiest railway station of the state in terms of daily passengers, Thiruvananthapuram Central (Station Code: TVC), is located at Thampanoor. It caters an average of 40,908 passengers a day (2017–2018), making it as the busiest railway station in Kerala. Opposite to the railway station is the major Bus Terminal of Kerala, the Central Bus Station, Thiruvananthapuram (TVM) which is the largest and the busiest Bus station in the state connecting to almost all the parts of the State and other interstate cities. Thampanoor is administered by Thiruvananthapuram Corporation. Councillor of Thampanoor Corporation Ward is Harikumar. It falls under the Thiruvananthapuram (State Assembly constituency) which inturn comes under one of the seven assemblies under the Thiruvananthapuram (Lok Sabha constituency).

Thampanoor is also the hub of a variety of hotel suites and lodging facilities, suiting the needs of all types of passengers. Some of which include Apollo Dimora, Hyacinth, Central Residency, Hotel Horizon, Greenland Lodging, Hotel Chaithram and numerous other big and small lodging facilities and restaurants. Thampanoor also houses many major Cinema Halls of the city, including Kairali, Sree, Nila, Aries Plex, New, Sree Kumar, Sree Vishakh, etc. Shopping Malls such as Pothys, Smart Bazaar, etc., are located around here. The S.S Kovil Road in Thampanoor is the state hub to numerous coaching centres for various Competitive Exams for securing Government Jobs such as Indian Civil Services, Bank, SSC, UPSC, Kerala PSC, etc. Thampanoor is also home to Regional offices of major newspapers and medias such as Malayala Manorama, Deshabhimani, Mangalam, Asianet News, News18 Kerala, Janamtv etc. It also consists of the headquarters of the Thiruvananthapuram railway division, one of the six administrative divisions of the Southern Railway Zone of the Indian Railways just at a mile distance, and the Kerala State Road Transport Corporation (KSRTC), one of the country's oldest state-run public bus transport services, in the Central Bus Station.

Thampanoor Railway Station is connected by daily train services to various major cities in India such as Delhi, Mumbai, Kolkata, Chennai, Bengaluru, Hyderabad, Kanyakumari, Madurai, Tiruchirappalli, Kochi, Kozhikode etc. Daily bus services, both KSRTC and private services are available from here to major cities in India.

Padmanabhaswamy Temple at East Fort, Trivandrum, is located just a mile away from Thampanoor Junction. Trivandrum Museums and Zoo is located about two miles away from here. Chalai Bazaar, one of the busiest market in the state, is located less than a mile from Thampanoor. Local Bus Service to any place in Trivandrum are available either from Thampanoor or East Fort which is located almost a mile apart. Thiruvananthapuram North Railway Station, the Satellite Rail Terminal of Trivandrum City, is located 7.9 km (4.9 mi) away from Thampanoor and can be reached by bus or local passenger trains. Thiruvananthapuram International Airport is located 4.3 km (2.7 mi) away. Thampanoor Police Station is located near the Railway Station.
