= Aluva KSRTC bus station =

State transport bus station

Aluva KSRTC bus station ആലുവ കെ.എസ്സ്.ആര്‍.ടി.സി ബസ്സ്‌ സ്റ്റേഷന്‍
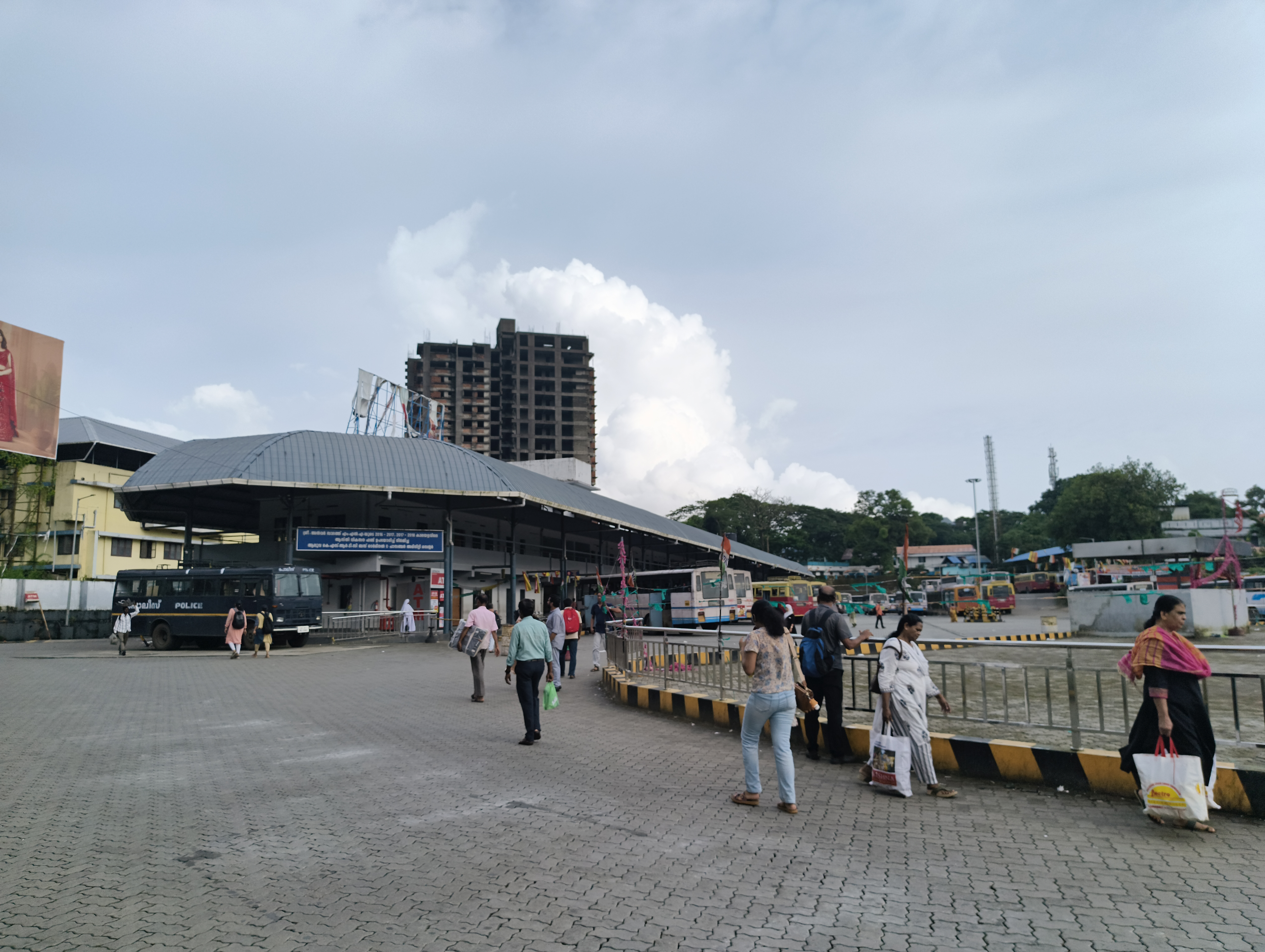
- Aluva KSRTC Bus Station after renovation in 2025

General information
- Location: Railway station road, Aluva, Ernakulam, Kerala
- Coordinates: 10.108°N 76.356°E
- System: Bus station
- Owner: Kerala State Road Transport Corporation (KSRTC)
- Operator: KSRTC
- Bus stands: (Towards TVM, KZKD, MNR & EKM)
- Bus operators: List: KSRTC (Interstate & Intrastate); KURTC (Intrastate)
- Connections: Bus; Aluva railway station Aluva metro station

Construction
- Structure type: At grade
- Parking: Yes

Other information
- Station code: ALV
- Fare zone: Ernakulam Zone

History
- Opened: ?
Location

Aluva KSRTC bus station is a transport hub in the Indian city of Aluva, owned and operated by the Kerala State Road Transport Corporation (KSRTC). An important transport hub in the state, the station is located left aside Aluva railway station, one of the busiest railway stations in the Ernakulam district, and a kilometre away from Aluva metro station of Kochi Metro.

== Overview ==
A prominent transport hub in the state, around 30000 people use the bus services from the station. Passengers travelling to Munnar high range rely heavily on the Aluva bus station making it one of the busiest stations in central Kerala.

== Renovation ==
Aluva KSRTC bus station entrance

In 2019, the authorities announced a ₹ 6 crore renovation project for the construction of a new bus terminal and passenger amenity center by demolishing the old terminal block. After multiple delays, new two-storey building with a total area of 30,155 square feet was inaugurated and opened to public in February 2024. On the ground floor, there is a ticket counter, a station office, a police aid post, six stalls, a 170-seat waiting area, a canteen and a waiting room for men and women. The first floor have five office rooms and a 43-seat waiting area. 55 shops would be later provided for commercial activities. The station have parking facilities for 30 buses and can normally handle 20 buses at a time. In addition, there are parking facilities for 110 two-wheelers and 110 cars.

== See also ==
- Ernakulam KSRTC Bus Station
