= Veli Railway Station =

Railway station in Kerala, India

Veli

General information
- Location: Veli, Thiruvananthapuram, Thiruvananthapuram, Kerala; India
- Coordinates: 8.556°N 76.872°E
- Elevation: 16 m (52 ft)
- System: Indian Railways station
- Line: Kollam–Thiruvananthapuram trunk line
- Platforms: 3
- Tracks: 4

Construction
- Structure type: Standard (on-ground station)
- Accessible: Disabled access

Other information
- Status: Functioning
- Station code: VELI
- Zone(s): Southern Railway zone
- Division(s): Thiruvananthapuram
Route map
Location
- Location within India Location within Kerala

Veli railway station (Code:VELI) is a railway stations serving the Indian city of Trivandrum, the capital of the state of Kerala. It lies on the Kollam–Thiruvananthapuram rail line. Veli lake is situated near the railway station in Trivandrum district. The station falls under the Thiruvananthapuram railway division of the Southern Railway Zone, Indian Railways. Kazhakoottam and Kochuveli railway stations are the nearby stations on the north and south, respectively.

== Significance ==
It is located near Kazhakoottam, which is significant for its proximity to the IT hub of the state Technopark, Sainik School, Kinfra Film and Video Park, Vikram Sarabhai Space Centre, DCSMAT media school, PRASAD film lab, Vismayas Max. Employees of Technopark and Vikram Sarabhai Space Centre hugely rely on this station. Food Corporation of India godown is also situated in the railway station premises.

== Layout ==
The station has currently two platforms.

== Services ==
Some passenger trains stop at the station.

Express trains

No.	Origin	Destination
1.	Thiruvananthapuram Central	Kollam Junction
2.	Kollam Junction	Thiruvananthapuram Central
3.	Nagercoil Junction	Kottayam

Passenger Trains

Sl No.	Train number	Source	Destination	Name/Type
1	56307	Kollam Junction	Trivandrum Central	Passenger
2	56700	Madurai	Punalur	Passenger
3	66304	Kollam Junction	Kanyakumari	MEMU
4	56309	Kollam Junction	Trivandrum Central	Passenger
5	56304	Nagercoil	Kottayam	Passenger
6	56701	Punalur	Madurai	Passenger
7	56715	Punalur	Kanniyakumari	Passenger
8	56716	Kanniyakumari	Punalur	Passenger
9	66305	Kanyakumari	Kollam Junction	MEMU
10	56308	Trivandrum Central	Kollam Junction	Passenger

== See also ==
- Trivandrum Central
- Kochuveli railway station
- Indian Rail Info
