= Aluva railway station =

Railway station in Aluva, Kerala, India

Aluva Alwaye
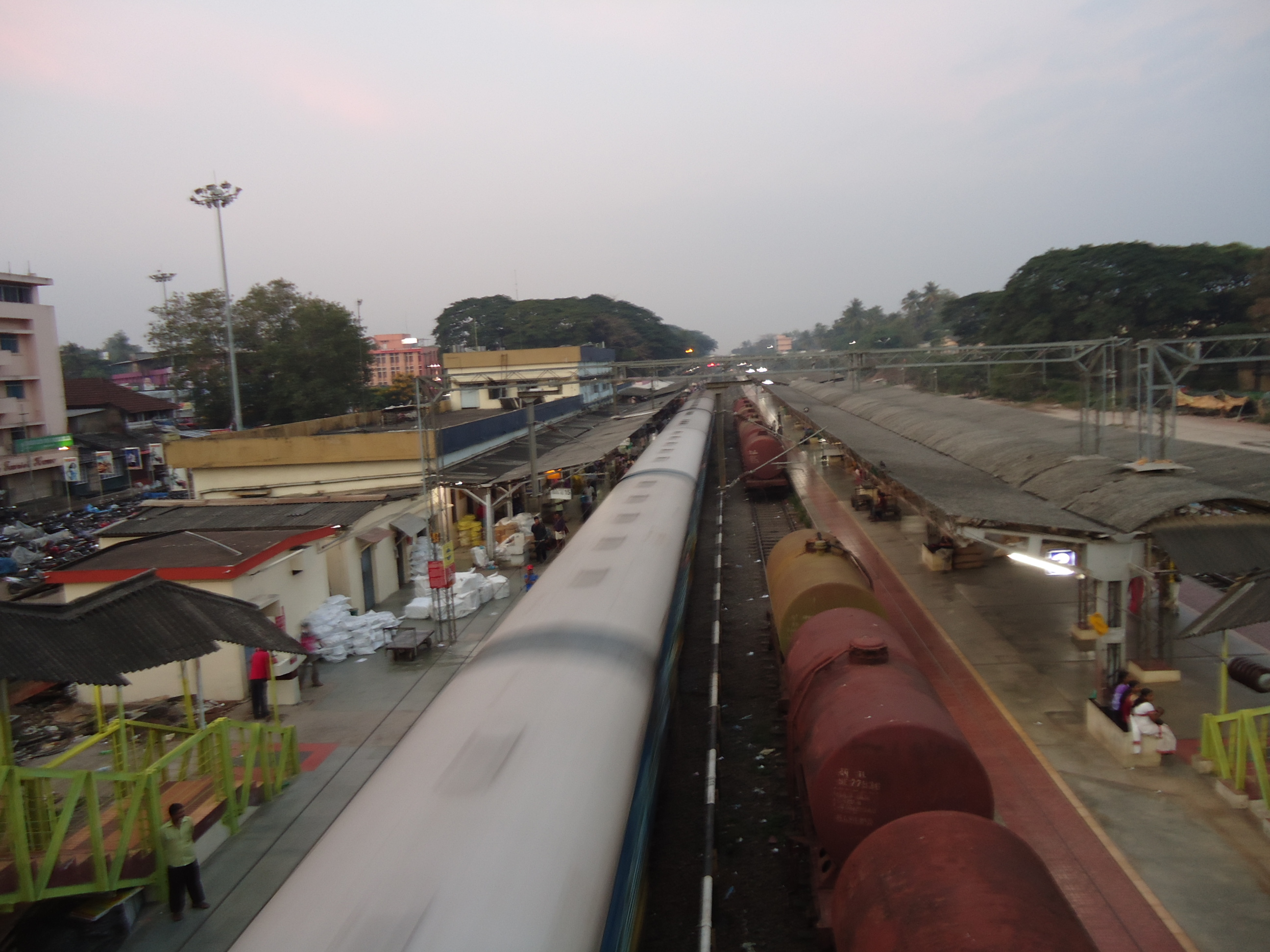
- A view of Aluva station in 2011. Three platforms are visible.

General information
- Location: Railway Station Road, Aluva, Kochi, Kerala
- Coordinates: 10.108°N 76.356°E
- Elevation: 12 m (39 ft)
- System: Station of Shoranur–Cochin Harbour section and Southern Railways.
- Owner: Ministry of Railways, Indian Railways
- Platforms: 3
- Tracks: 6
- Connections: Aluva KSRTC, Aluva metro

Construction
- Structure type: Standard on-ground station
- Platform levels: 1

Other information
- Status: Active
- Station code: AWY
- Fare zone: Southern Railways

Passengers
- 12,160 per day

Services
Preceding station	Indian Railways	Following station
Chovvara towards Shoranur Junction	Southern Railway zone Shoranur–Cochin Harbour section	Kalamassery towards Cochin Harbour Terminus
Route map
Location

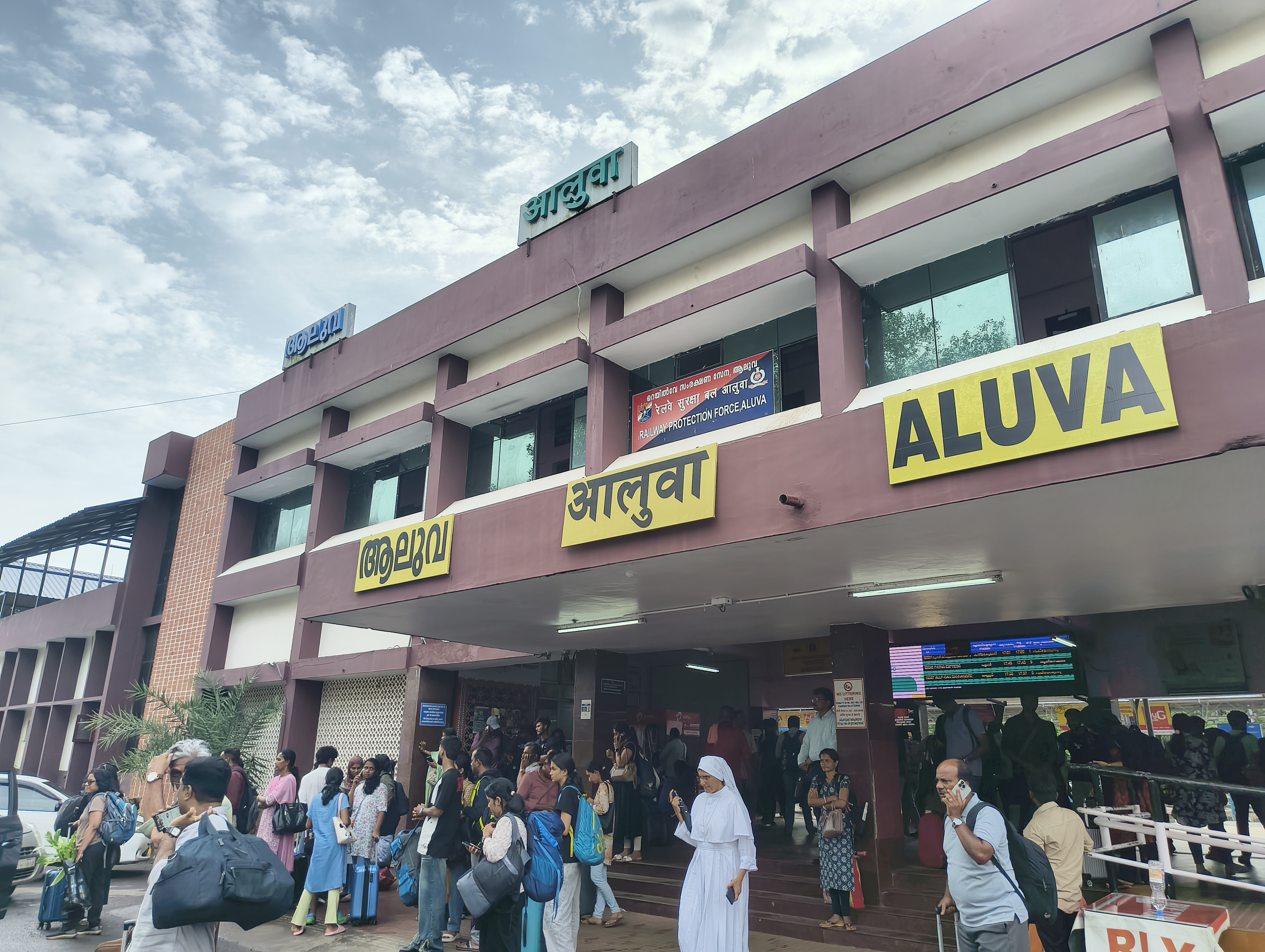
Entry of Aluva Railway Station

Aluva railway station (station code: AWY) is an NSG–3 category Indian railway station in Thiruvananthapuram railway division of Southern Railway zone. It is a railway station mainly catering to the passengers from the northern part of the city of Kochi in the Indian state of Kerala. The station lies in the Shoranur–Cochin Harbour section of Thiruvananthapuram railway division. It is located right aside Aluva KSRTC bus stand, one of the main bus terminals in the city of Kochi, and a kilometre away from Aluva metro station of the Kochi Metro.

Aluva is an important halting stop for all passenger trains passing through the region except Rajadhani Express and a few super fast trains. It is a convenient station to alight for passengers traveling to Kalamassery, North Paravur, Idukki District, Kodungallur, Perumbavoor, Kakkanad, Kizhakkambalam, Kothamangalam and Muvattupuzha. It also serves passengers to and from Cochin International Airport. It is the third busiest railway station in Kochi, after Ernakulam Junction railway station and Ernakulam Town railway station. The station also handles the highest number of migrant labourers in the state since it is closest to Perumbavoor, a suburban town in Kochi Urban Agglomeration.

== Layout ==
Aluva railway station has 3 platforms to handle long distance and passenger trains and 1 platform to handle cargo.

== Revenue ==
Aluva railway station is a high-revenue-earning station for Thiruvananthapuram railway division. In the financial year 2018–19 it earned 63,38,17,308 rupees (63.38 crores), the third highest in Ernakulam district, fifth highest in Kerala after Thiruvananthapuram Central in Thiruvananthapuram (184.48 crores), Ernakulam Junction railway station in Kochi (163.38 crores), Thrissur railway station in Thrissur (106.74 crores), Ernakulam Town railway station in Kochi (67.38 crores), and 19th highest in Southern Railways.

== Trains passing through Aluva railway station ==
Train No:	Origin	Destination	Train name
22639/22640	Alappuzha	Chennai	Alappuzha Express
13352/13351	Alappuzha	Dhanbad	Tata Express
16307/16308	Alappuzha	Kannur	Alappuzha Kannur Express
16341/16342	Guruvayur	Thiruvananthapuram Central	Guruvayur Thiruvananthapuram Express
12512/12511	Thiruvananthapuram North	Gorakhpur Junction	Raptisagar SF Express
12625/12626	Thiruvananthapuram Central	New Delhi	Kerala Express
16302/16301	Thiruvananthapuram Central	Shornur Junction	Venad Express
16326/16325	Thiruvananthapuram Central	Indore Junction	Ahilyanagari Express
16332/16331	Thiruvananthapuram Central	Mumbai Chatrapati Shivaji Terminus	Mumbai Express
16346/16345	Thiruvananthapuram Central	Lokmanya Tilak Terminus	Netravathi Express
16604/16603	Thiruvananthapuram Central	Mangalore	Maveli Express
16316/16315	Kochuveli	Bangalore	Kochuveli Bangalore Express
19577/19578	Tirunelveli	jamnagar	Happa Express
12788/12787	Tirunelveli	Bilaspur	Bilaspur Superfast Express
16128/16127	Guruvayur	Chennai Egmore	Guruvayur Express
16606/16605	Thiruvananthapuram Central	Mangalore	Ernad Express
12507/12508	Thiruvananthapuram Central	Guwahati	Thiruvananthapuram Guwahati Super Fast Express
12617/12618	Ernakulam South	H.Nizamuddin	Mangala Lakshadweep Express
12645/12646	Ernakulam South	H.Nizamuddin	Millenium Express
16187/16188	Ernakulam South	Karaikal	Tea Garden Express
16305/16306	Ernakulam South	Kannur	Intercity Express
16307/16308	Ernakulam South	Kannur	Executive Express
12678/12677	Ernakulam South	Bangalore	Intercity Express
12683/12684	Ernakulam South	Bangalore	Superfast Express
22607/22608	Ernakulam South	Bangalore	Superfast Express
10216/10215	Ernakulam South	Madgon	Madagon Express
22669/22670	Ernakulam South	Patna	Patna Express
Ernakulam South	Patna	Patna Express	
16337/16338	Ernakulam South	Okha	Okha Express
12522/12521	Ernakulam South	Barauni	Raptisagar Express
11098/11097	Ernakulam South	Pune	Poorna Express
12977/12978	Ernakulam South	Ajmer	Marusagar Express
22816/22817	Ernakulam South	Bilaspur	Bilaspur Express
16649/16650	Mangalore	Nagercoil	Parasuram Express
17229/17230	Thiruvananthapuram Central	Secunderabad Junction	Sabari Express
16381/16382	Pune Junction	Kanyakumari	Jayanthi Janatha Express
16525/16526	Kanyakumari	Bangalore	Island Express
12623/12624	Chennai	Thiruvananthapuram Central	Thiruvananthapuram Mail
12257/12258	Kochuveli	Yeswantpur	Yeswantpur Express
16629/16630	Thiruvananthapuram Central	Mangalore	Malabar Express
16347/16348	Trivandrum	Mangalore	Mangalore Express
16343/16344	Thiruvananthapuram Central	Madurai Junction	Amritha Express
16327/16328	Korba	Thiruvananthapuram Central	Korba Express
16317/16318	Kanyakumari	Jammutawi	Himsagar Express
16311/16312	Kochuveli	Bikaner	Kochuveli Bikaner express
12515/12516	Thiruvananthapuram Central	Guwahati	Thiruvananthapuram Guwahati Superfast Express
12659/12660	Nagercoil	shalimar	Gurudev Express
16333/16334	Thiruvananthapuram Central	Veraval	Veraval Express
16335/16336	Gandhidham	Nagercoil	Nagercoil Gandhidham Express
16302/16301	Thiruvananthapuram Central	Shoranur Junction	Venad Express
12075/12076	Thiruvananthapuram Central	Kozhikode	Janshatabdi Express
22633/22634	Thiruvananthapuram Central	Nizamuddin	Nizamuddin SF Express
18567/18568	Kollam Junction	Vishakapatanam	Kollam–Visakhapatnam Express

== Passenger trains passing through Aluva railway station ==
Train No:	Origin	Destination
56608	Ernakulam South	Shoranur
56606	Ernakulam South	Shoranur
66612	Ernakulam South	Palakad Jn (MEMU)
56375	Ernakulam South	Guruvayur
56370	Ernakulam South	Guruvayur
56606	Ernakulam South	Guruvayur
56363	Ernakulam South	Nilambur
56366	Punalur	Guruvayur
56608	Ernakulam South	Guruvayur
