= Thiruvananthapuram South railway station =

Railway station in Kerala, India

Thiruvananthapuram South (TVCS)
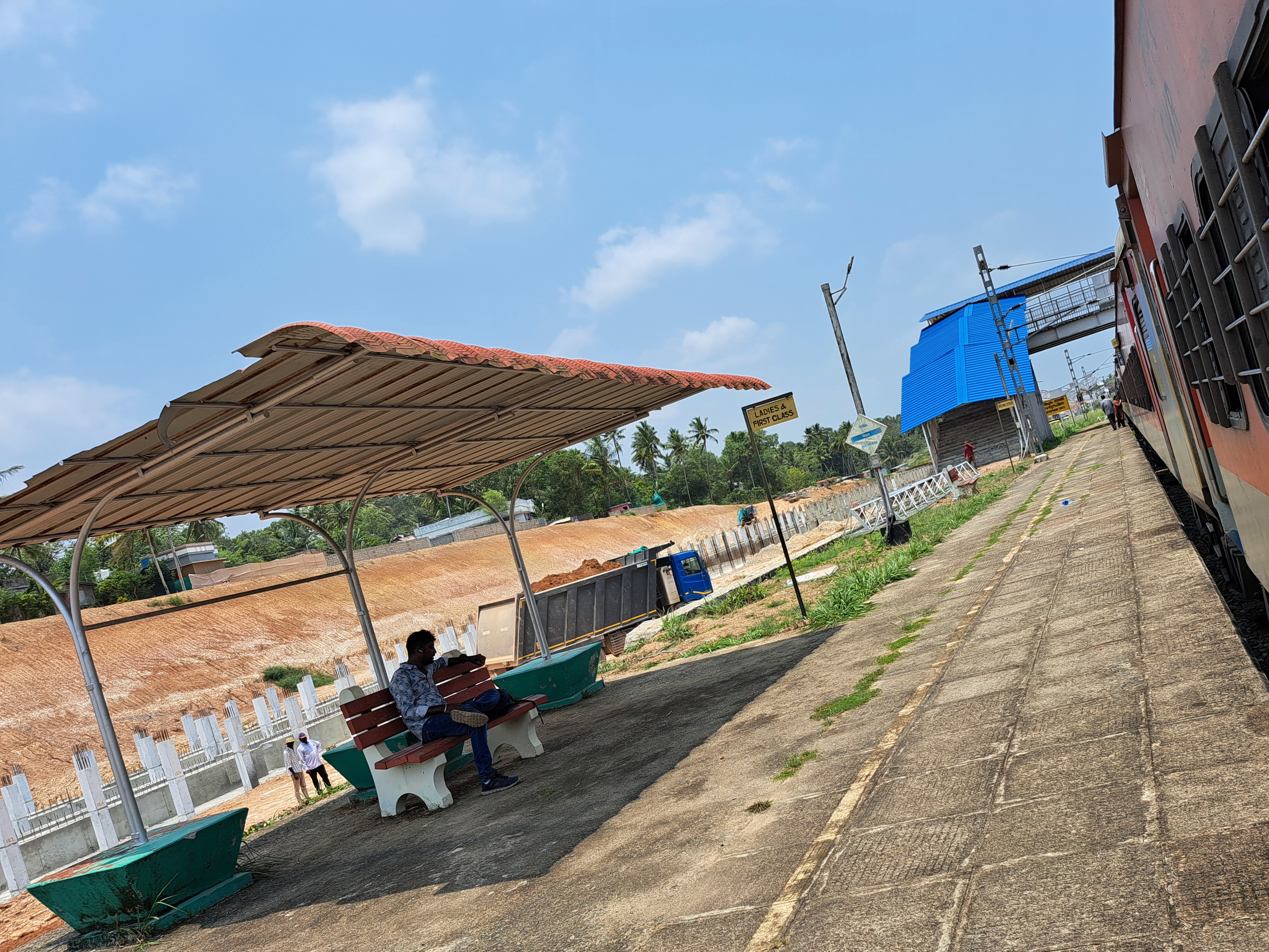

General information
- Location: Nemom, Thiruvananthapuram, Kerala; India
- Coordinates: 8.454°N 77.0105°E
- Elevation: 28 metres (92 ft)
- System: Indian Railways station
- Owner: Indian Railways
- Operator: Indian Railways
- Line: Thiruvananthapuram–Nagercoil–Kanyakumari line
- Platforms: 2

Construction
- Structure type: Standard (on-ground station)
- Parking: Yes
- Accessible: Disabled access

Other information
- Status: Functioning
- Station code: NEM
- Zone(s): Southern Railway zone
- Division(s): Thiruvananthapuram

History
- Opened: 1979
- Rebuilt: 2019
Route map
Location
- Location within Kerala

Thiruvananthapuram South Railway station (formerly Nemom railway station, Station Code: TVCS) is an NSG–6 category Indian railway station in Thiruvananthapuram railway division of Southern Railway zone. It is one of the six railway stations serving the city of Thiruvananthapuram which is also proposed to act as the second satellite station to Thiruvananthapuram Central railway station in the state of Kerala, India.

== Train operating centre ==
Indian Railways have finalised a proposal for setting up an operating centre in Nemom, for trains departing from and terminating at Thiruvananthapuram Central. All coach maintenance activities performed in Thiruvananthapuram Central is proposed to be transferred to Nemom once the operating centre is commissioned. Railways has proposed to set up 10 pit lines for maintenance of 30 trains, 12 stabling lines, sick lines and staff quarters at Nemom.

== Proposed new passenger terminal ==
The Ministry of Railways, in its budget for fiscal year 2011–2012, announced to develop Nemom as second satellite passenger terminal to Thiruvananthapuram Central. Thiruvananthapuram thus will become the first city in Kerala to have two satellite stations. Nemom will soon be developed as a full-fledged Passenger Terminus (Coaching Terminal) with 5 platforms and will act as a terminus station for trains coming to Thiruvananthapuram Central, thereby reducing rush/congestion in the station.

An amount of Rs. 77.30 crores have been allotted for the first phase of the new Terminal, as per Shri O. Rajagopal M.L.A., as reported by the media including The Hindu.

It is also proposed to lay one more track between Nemom and Kochuveli to ease the traffic in this corridor. This stretch will become the first in the state to have a three-line service.

Extension of proposed Sabari rail line from Erumely via Pathanamthitta, Punalur, Nedumanagadu is expected to connect with proposed Nemom terminal. The station is on the way of renaming to Thiruvananthapuram South Terminal.

== See also ==
- Indian Railways
- Transport in Thiruvananthapuram
- Thiruvananthapuram Central
- Thiruvanathapuram North railway station
- Thiruvananthapuram Pettah railway station
