= Thiruvananthapuram Central KSRTC bus station =

Bus station in Kerala, India

Central bus station Thiruvananthapuram
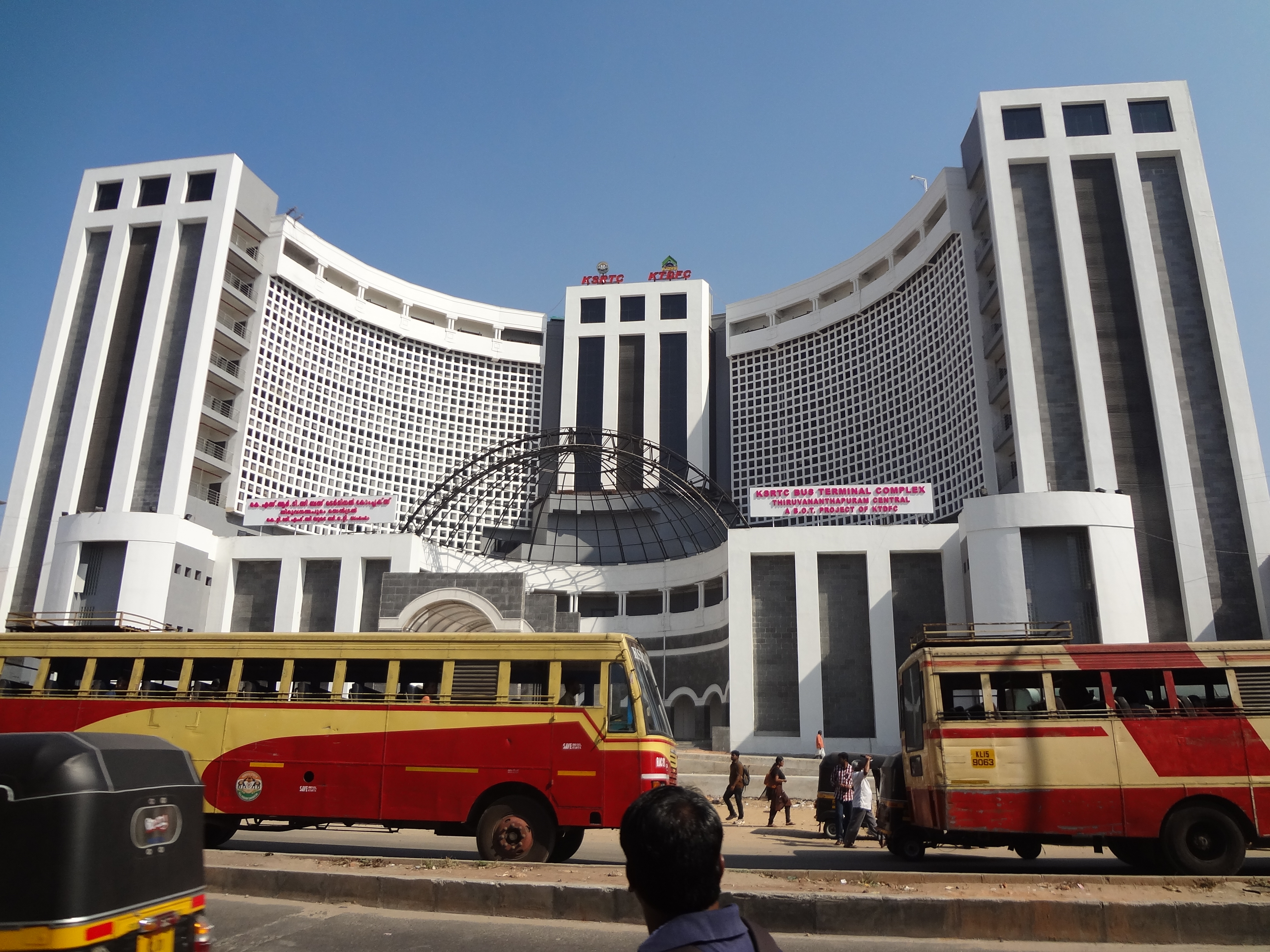
- KSRTC bus terminal complex at Thampanoor, Thiruvananthapuram

General information
- Location: Thampanoor, Thiruvananthapuram; India
- Coordinates: 8.488°N 76.952°E
- System: Bus station
- Owner: Kerala State Road Transport Corporation (KSRTC)
- Operator: KSRTC
- Platforms: 29 bus bays

Construction
- Structure type: At grade
- Platform levels: 12
- Parking: Yes

History
- Rebuilt: February 2014

Passengers
- 94,000
Location

Central bus station, also called Thampanoor bus station, is a bus station in Thiruvananthapuram, Kerala, India. It is located opposite the Trivandrum Central railway station at Thampanoor. It is the largest and busiest bus terminal in Kerala with 7.41 acres serving the buses traveling on all routes in Kerala and other inter-state destinations such as Chennai, Bangalore, Mysore, Nagercoil, and Kanyakumari. It is also the headquarters of the Kerala State Road Transport Corporation (KSRTC). A High-tech terminal complex was constructed by Harrisons Malayalam Limited Engineering Department, a Kerala-based construction contracting company.

== History ==
The work for the new central bus terminal at Thampanoor started by March 2010 and was opened to public on 3 February 2014 by the Chief Minister of Kerala, Shri. Oommen Chandy.

== Overview ==
The 12-storied complex has a floor area of 24,984 sq m is on the southern side of the KSRTC premises facing Ponnara Sreedhar Park. The project is a joint venture of the Kerala Transport Development Finance Corporation (KTDFC) and the KSRTC, being implemented on build–operate–transfer (BOT) concept. Central Bus Station Thiruvananthapuram (30,573.54 meter square / 3.25 Lakhs S.F) is the third largest Bus station after Kozhikode and Kasargode.

The Central bus station has been divided into four zones. The arrival bus bay zone consists of 5 platforms and departure bus bay zone with passenger facilities consists of 25 platforms. The bus terminal supporting facility zone consists of space for idle bus parking, repair garage, fuel-filling facility, and a commercial zone which includes shopping complex, a multiplex, and an international convention center.

Most of the floors inside the terminal are marked for commercial purposes, which include central lobby and parking facilities. Space has been provided for setting up offices and other institutions from the fourth floor. The bus operations within the terminal will be taken care by the front office on the ground floor whereas the four-storied administrative block, set up behind the terminal will cater to the administration of the Central KSRTC Depot. This High-tech terminal complex was constructed by Harrisons Malayalam Limited Engineering Department, a Kerala-based construction contracting company. The terminal can handle about 2,500 to 3,400 schedules a day. It caters to about 1240 bus arrivals and 1250 departures daily out of which 45% trips are long-distance buses and 55% the Moffusil buses (short distance, within Thiruvananthapuram district). The Central bus station has been divided into four zones.

== Services ==
Central bus station, Thampanoor, serves as the main boarding & alighting point in Thiruvananthapuram for all the passengers travelling outside city and state. It is being managed by KSRTC, with a majority of buses catering to long distances services and short distance (Moffusil) buses.

From Central bus station, KSRTC mainly operates long-distance bus services with in Kerala state and to various district headquarters. Interstate bus services towards Chennai, Bangalore, Kanyakumari, Nagercoil from Thiruvananthapuram also starts from Central bus station only

== Future developments planned ==
It is proposed to shift the long-distance buses (within districts of Kerala and inter state buses) to Enchakkal bus terminal. The bus terminal is a green field project proposed to be equipped with bus infrastructure and passenger facilities.

A flyover has also been proposed from the complex to the railway station for the hassle-free movement of the commuters arriving in the buses and trains.

== See also ==
- Transport in Thiruvananthapuram
- KSRTC
