= Sabari Superfast Express =

Train in India

Thiruvananthapuram Central - Secundrabad Junction Sabari Superfast Express
Overview
- Service type: Superfast Express
- Locale: Kerala, Tamilnadu, Andhra Pradesh & Telangana
- First service: 6 April 1987; 39 years ago
- Current operator: Southern Railway
- Ridership: Trivandrum Division

Route
- Termini: Thiruvananthapuram Central (TVC); Secunderabad (SC)
- Stops: 40
- Distance travelled: 1,555 km (966 mi)
- Average journey time: 28 hours (Approx.)
- Service frequency: Daily
- Train number: 20629 / 20630

On-board services
- Classes: AC First Class, AC 2 Tier, AC 3 Tier, Sleeper Class, General Unreserved
- Seating arrangements: Yes
- Sleeping arrangements: Yes
- Catering facilities: Available
- Observation facilities: Large windows
- Baggage facilities: Yes
- Other facilities: Below the seats

Technical
- Rolling stock: LHB coach
- Track gauge: 1,676 mm (5 ft 6 in)
- Electrification: Yes, Fully Electrified Route
- Operating speed: 55 km/h (34 mph) average including halts.
Route map
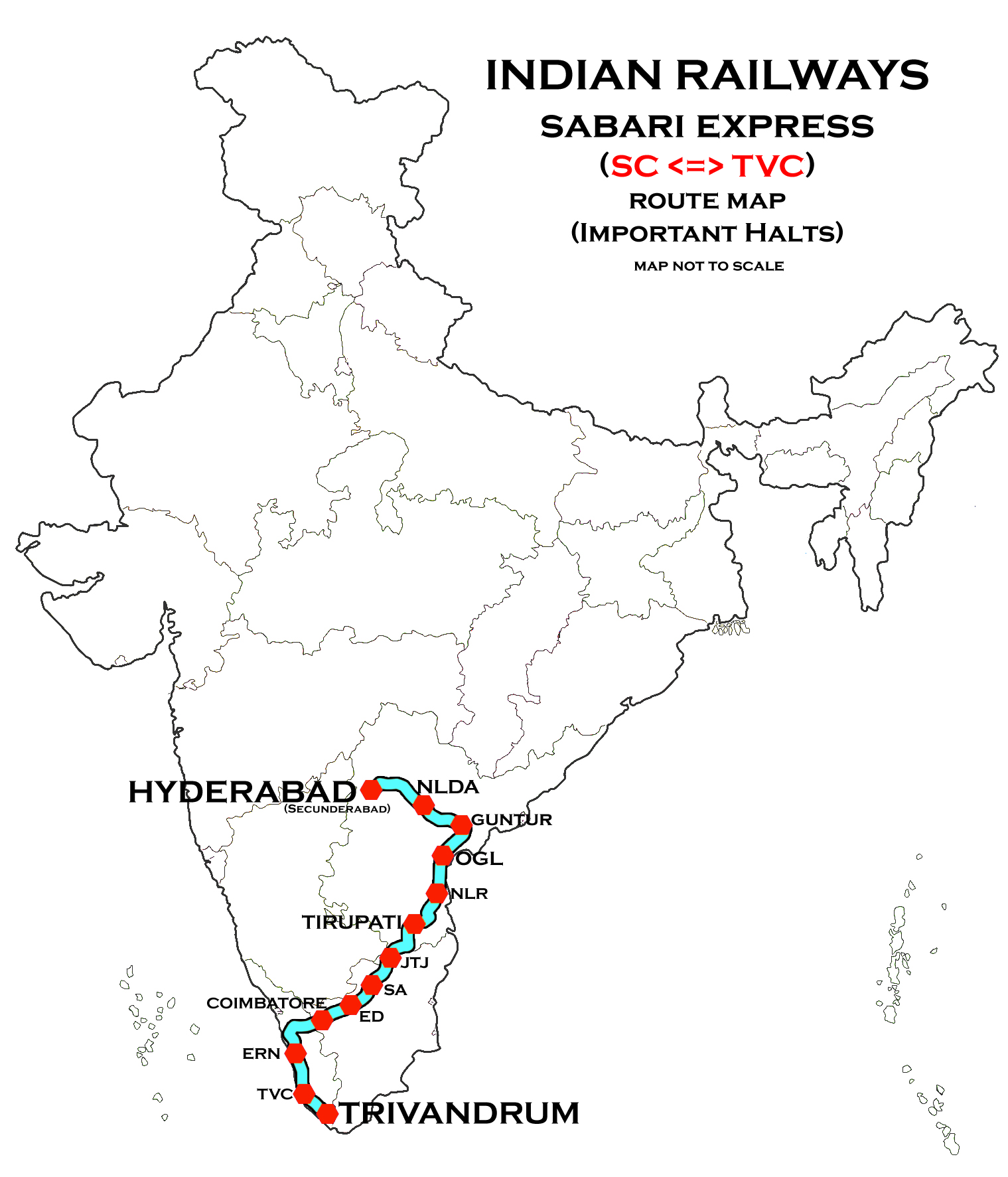

The 20629 / 20630 Sabari Superfast Express is the train operated in the route between Trivandrum and Secunderabad. It is one of the most in demand trains and runs with heavy waiting list throughout the year. The Train is currently under the ownership of Southern Railway zone of the Indian Railways. It runs between Secunderabad Junction and Thiruvananthapuram Central. The train got a Shin Chan themed makeup in June 2026.

It is one of the 2 trains which are running between Hyderabad and Kerala. The train has a pantry car attached. It is always crowded with devotees looking to travel to the Sabarimala Temple.

== Etymology ==
The train is named after the famous Hindu pilgrimage site, the Sabarimala Temple.

== History ==
It was a mail express train and started its first service 37 years ago, on 6 April 1987.

Earlier the train used to run between Hyderabad Deccan and Cochin Harbour Terminus railway station from1987 till 2005. It was extended to Thiruvananthapuram Central from 27 March 2005.

The Train Category got Upgraded from Mail Express to Superfast Service from 29th September 2025.

== Schedule ==
The train from Thiruvananthapuram Central to Secunderabad Junction leaves at 6:45 AM and arrives at 11:00 AM the next day. It carries the number 20630.

The train in the opposite direction, from Secunderabad Junction to Thiruvananthapuram Central, leaves at 02:25 PM and arrives at 06:20 PM the next day. It uses the number 20629.

The total distance covered by this train is 1555 km (974 miles). The average journey takes approximately 28 hours.

== Important halting stations ==
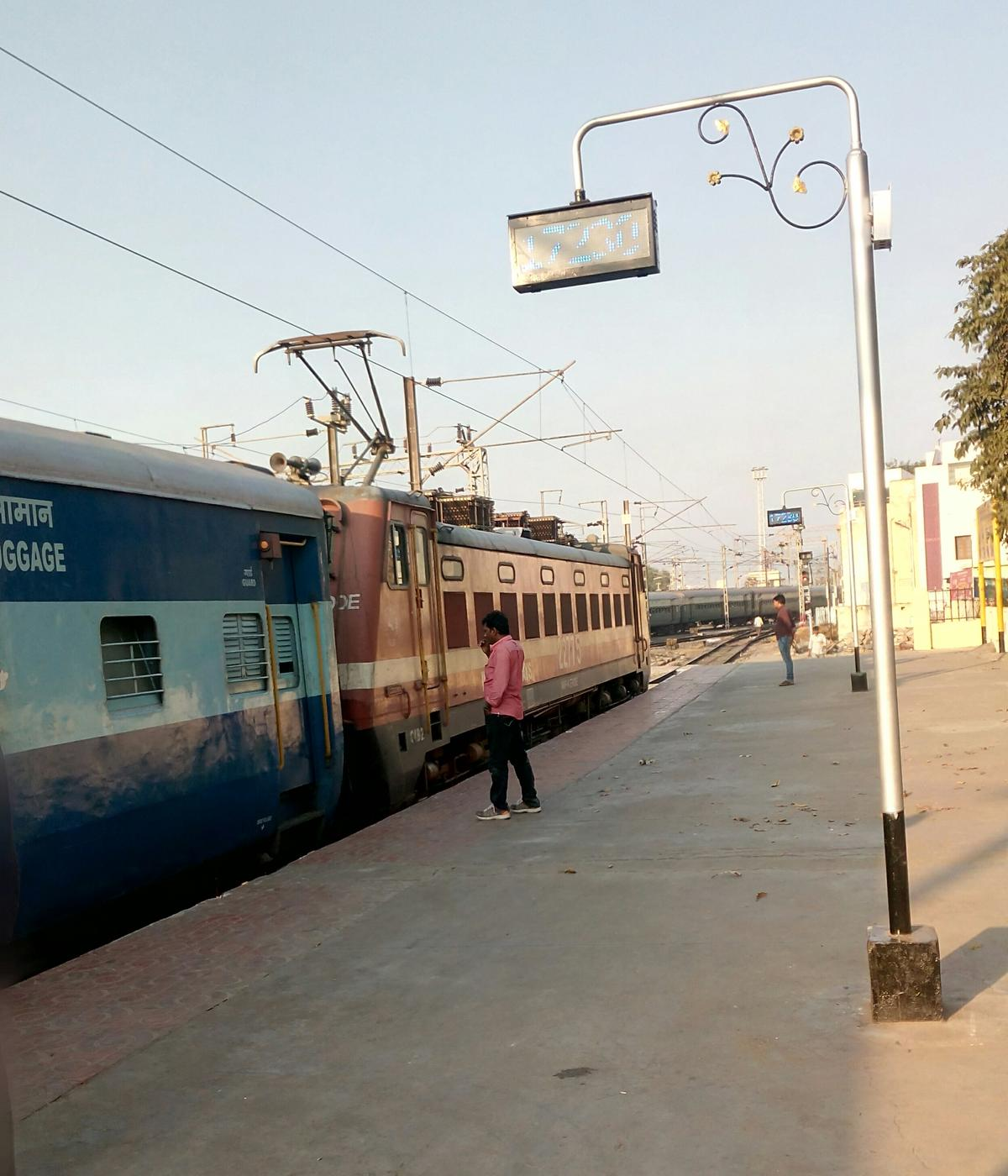
Sabari express at Guntur Railway Station

- Thiruvananthapuram Central
- Varkala
- Kollam Junction
- Karunagappalli
- Kayamkulam
- Mavelikara
- Chengannur
- Thiruvalla
- Changanasseri
- Kottayam
- Ernakulam Town (North)
- Aluva
- Thrissur
- Wadakkancherry
- Ottapalam
- Palakkad Junction
- Coimbatore Junction
- Tiruppur
- Erode Junction
- Salem Junction
- Morappur
- Jolarpettai Junction
- Katpadi Junction
- Chittoor
- Tirupathi
- Renigunta Junction
- Gudur Junction
- Nellore
- Singarayakonda
- Ongole
- Chirala
- Bapatla
- Nidubrolu
- Tenali Junction
- Guntur Junction
- sattenapalle
- Piduguralla
- Nadikudi
- Miryalguda
- Nalgonda
- Charlapalli
- Secunderabad Junction

== Rake sharing ==
This train runs with 3 dedicated rakes with primary maintenance at Trivandrum Central. This Train Had Rake sharing with Tirupathi - Secundrabad Junction Padmavathi Superfast Express till 2025

== Traction ==
Previously hauled by a WAP-4, the train is now regularly hauled by either a Lallaguda Loco Shed based WAP-7 or Royapuram Loco Shed based WAP-7 electric locomotive on its entire journey.
