= Kaniyapuram =

- suburb
- Location in Kerala, India
- Coordinates: 8°35′15″N 76°51′24″E
- Country: India
- State: Kerala
- District: Thiruvananthapuram

Population (2011)
  - Total: 41,250

Languages
  - Official: Malayalam, English
- Time zone: UTC+5:30 (IST)
- PIN: 695301
- Telephone code: +91 471-XXXXXXX
- Vehicle registration: KL 22
- Lok Sabha constituency: Trivandrum

Kaniyapuram is a residential and IT industrial area of Thiruvananthapuram metropolitan area of Thiruvananthapuram city around 17 kilometres (11 mi) from Thiruvananthapuram, Kerala, India. The main centre of Kaniyapuram area is located in NH-66 in between Kazhakkoottam and Pallippuram CRPF Base. The Kaniyapuram locality (Kaniyapuram pradesam) is a vast area and expands to; Andoorkonam in the East, Parvathy Puthanar in the West, Vetturoad in the South and Pallippuram (CRPF Base) in the North. The Kaniyapuram town belongs to the Andoorkonam Panchayat, although Andoorkonam still remains a village 3 kilometres (1.9 mi) to the east.The main town in Kaniyapuram is Alummoodu junction. Kaniyapuram Belongs To Andoorkonam Panchayat & Kadinamkulam Panchayat . Kaniyapuram Eastern areas are in Andoorkonam Panchayat Kaniyapuram Western areas are in Kadinamkulam Panchayat Both Areas Have Same pincode 695301

== History ==
The name "Kaniyapuram" is believed to have derived from the word "Kaniyan Puram - the domain of Kaniyans /Ganak- astrologists" or " Kaniyar Puram - the place of Kaniyars - the proponents of Kaniyar Kali, a temple art form" or "Ganika Puram (the place of Ganikas - the courtesans").

The Lebbas are amongst the very prominent clan of Kaniyapuram. According to documented history, the Lebbas migrated from Tamil Nadu in the early 1650s to Kerala. It is believed that they established in Kaniyapuram as early as the 1650s and established themselves as traders in Kaniyapuram. They were successful merchants and operated almost all the business in Kaniyapuram until recent times.

The Lebbas' main contribution to the Kaniyapuram society is the establishment of The Muslim High School, Kaniyapuram. The school was founded by late S Ahmed Kunju Lebba in 1947. The school had played a major role in the educational and social development of the area. Students from far away places such as Chirayinkil, Perumathura, Kazhakkoottam, Pothencode etc.

It is stated in "Insight" the Bimonthly Journal of Ambedkar Study Circle, Jawaharlal Nehru University (JNU), Delhi, that during the early 1900s Dalit Movement, "Walk to Freedom" led by the famous Dalit reformist, Ayyankali, the youngsters got out on the Kaniyapuram streets to win their basic rights; and the Kaniyapuram Dalit farmers did participate in an agrarian strike by not showing up in the paddy fields (1907).

Being surrounded by coconut groves and backwaters, coir and associated industries were aplenty in the yesteryears and considered the main occupation of Kaniyapuram residents. However, this industry is currently in doldrums and struggling for survival.

Until three decades, water transport was the main mean of goods transportation from Kaniyapuram. Coconuts and coir products were transported to Kollam and Alappuzha from Kaniyapuram, through Parvathi Puthannaar and Kadinam Lake in large covered wooden boats (kettuvallam) and were loaded from the jetties located at Kadavil, Anakkapilla and Channankara.

The water transportation through Parvathi Puthannaar which played a crucial role in the lives of many traders in Kaniyapuram came into disuse after the advent of railways and the National Highways. In 2002 the state Government undertook a dredging and widening project to revitalise the canal to attract tourists.

== Accessibility ==
- Kaniyapuram is 14 km towards north from Thiruvananthapuram city.
- Thiruvananthapuram International Airport, KSRTC Bus Depot Thiruvananthapuram and Thiruvananthapuram Central Railway Station are just around 14 km from Kaniyapuram with easy road and railroad connections.
- National Highway 66 is crisscrossed by a number of rural roads.
- From Vetturoad one road towards east lead to Saink School-Kattayikkonam-Chanthavila, connecting to Pothencode and MC Road..
- Another road from Vetturoad toward west connects to Chittattumukku-St.Andrews-Puthenthopu-Menamkulam-Station Kadavu etc.
- One road from Kaniyapuram centre towards west connects to Murukkumpuzha-Chirayinkil, Masthan jn., pallinada, jawacottage, Channankara-Perumathura, Padinjattumukku-Puthenthope etc.
- Another road from Pallippuram towards east lead to Andoorkonam, Pothencode etc.
- Several panchayath roads connect every nook-and-corner of Kaniyapuram locality.

== Notable people ==
- Alikunju Shastri - Freedom Fighter and Former MLA, Kerala Legislative Assembly, 1960.
- AD.M.A VAHID - EX MLA KERALA LEGISLATIVE ASSEMBLY 2001 TO2016
