= Thiruvananthapuram North–Yesvantpur AC Express =

Passenger train

Thiruvananthapuram North – Yesvantpur Junction AC Express

Overview
- Service type: AC Express
- Status: Operational
- Locale: Kerala, Tamil Nadu, and Karnataka
- First service: 2 May 2013
- Current operator: South Western Railway

Route
- Termini: Thiruvananthapuram North (KCVL); Yesvantpur Junction (YPR)
- Stops: 16
- Distance travelled: 860 km (530 mi)
- Average journey time: 15 hours 40 minutes
- Service frequency: Weekly
- Train number: 16561/16562

On-board services
- Classes: AC 1st class, AC 2 tier, AC 3 tier
- Seating arrangements: Not Available
- Sleeping arrangements: Available
- Auto-rack arrangements: No
- Catering facilities: Pantry car On-board catering E-catering
- Observation facilities: Large windows
- Baggage facilities: YES

Technical
- Rolling stock: LHB coach
- Track gauge: 5 ft 6 in (1,676 mm) broad gauge
- Operating speed: 120 km/h (75 mph) (including halts)

Thiruvananthapuram North–Yesvantpur AC Express, train numbers 16561/16562, is a fully air conditioned passenger train service between Thiruvananthapuram North and Yesvantpur Junction stations.

== Schedule ==
Train number	Station code	Departure station	Departure time	Departure day	Arrival station	Arrival time	Arrival day
16561	YPR	Yesvantpur Junction	3:20 PM	Thursday	Thiruvananthapuram North	6:20 AM	Friday
16562	KCVL	Thiruvananthapuram North	12:50 PM (afternoon)	Friday	Yesvantpur Junction	4:15 AM	Saturday

== Coaches ==
The Kochuveli–Yesvantpur AC Express has 1 AC first class, 1 AC 2 tier, 16 AC 3 tier & 2 end on generator coaches. In addition, it carries a pantry car coach.

== Rake sharing ==
12213/12214 – Yeshvantapur–Delhi Sarai Rohilla AC Duronto Express
