= Kazhakoottam =

Kazhakkoottam
- Suburb
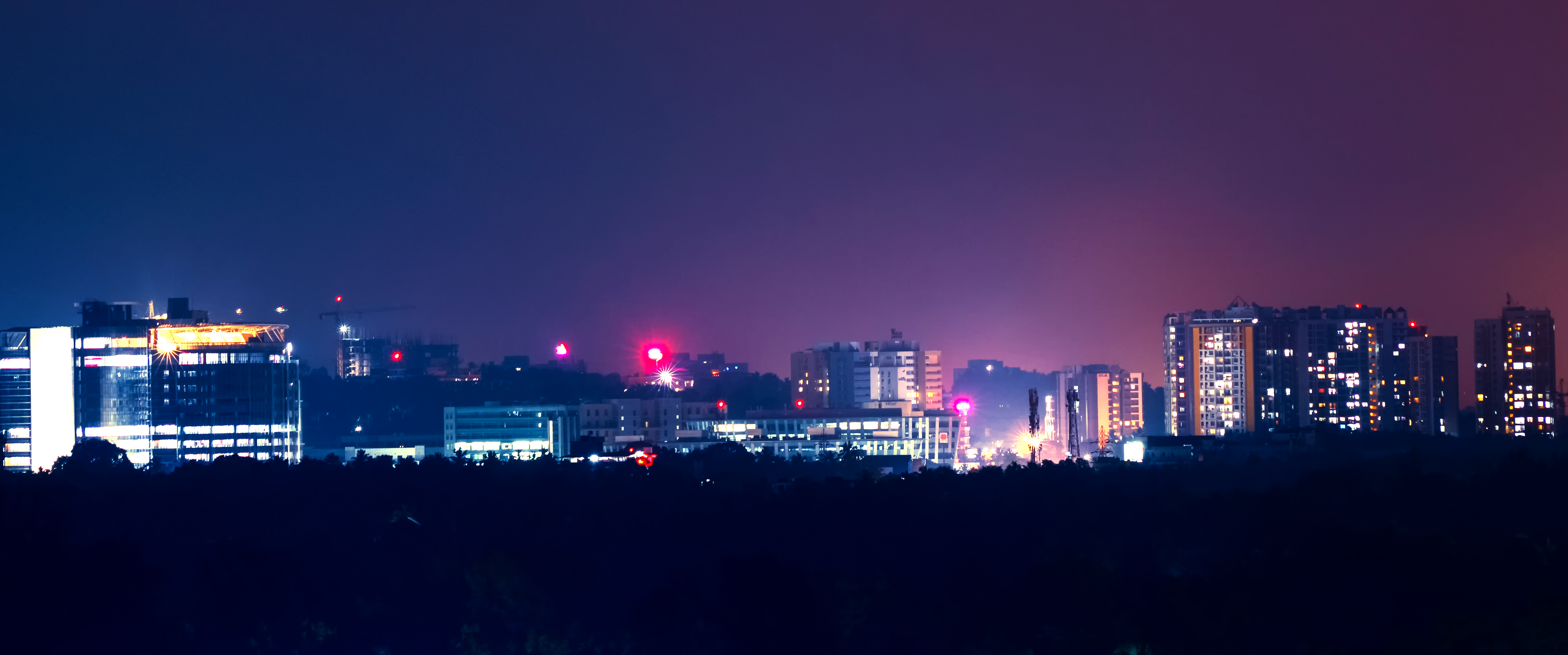
- Skyline of Kazhakoottam area with the Technopark Phase I campus

- Location in Kerala, India
- Coordinates: 8°33′56″N 76°52′29″E
- Country: India
- State: Kerala
- District: Thiruvananthapuram

Government
  - Body: Thiruvananthapuram Corporation
  - MLA: V. Muraleedharan; BJP
- Time zone: UTC+5:30 (IST)
- PIN: 695582, 695585
- Telephone code: +91 471-XXXXXXX
- Vehicle registration: KL- 22

Kazhakkoottam is a major urban area in the city of Thiruvananthapuram, India. The largest IT park in the country in terms of developed area, Technopark, along with Technocity-an upcoming integrated IT township-is situated at 6km North of Kazhakoottam. Hence, it is known as the Information Technology capital of Kerala. It is one of the fastest-growing areas of the state.

== History ==
Kazhakkoottam was the centre of power for Kazhakuttathu Ugran Pillai who was prominent among the so-called Ettuveetil Pillamar (Pillais from Eight Houses) who rebelled against Travancore King Marthanda Varma in the late 18th century. After defeating Pillai, Varma destroyed his palace and replaced it with a pond. To redeem himself, he built a temple to Krishna nearby. Both the pond and the temple survive. The Kazhakuttom Mahadeva Temple is believed to be 1000 years old.

== Administration ==
Kazhakootam is the 1st ward in Thiruvananthapuram Corporation which is administered by the Mayor. Kazhakoottam assembly constituency is one of the 140 assemblies of the Kerala Legislative Assembly. It is represented by V. Muraleedharan from BJP 2026 onwards. The Kazhakootam constituency also belongs to the greater Thiruvananthapuram Lok Sabha Constituency which is represented by Dr. Shashi Tharoor MP (Indian National Congress) from 2009 onwards in the Indian Parliament.
Kazhakuttam ward councillor Prashanth. S from CPI(M) was elected from December 2025.

== Transportation ==
Kazhakoottam is a major junction where the National Highway 66 (India) Kazhakkoottam Bypass and the main road towards the city are joined. It is well connected to all major destinations in the city by bus services from Kazhakoottam. Kazhakoottam is only 15 kilometres (9 mi) away from Thiruvananthapuram city centre. The nearest airport is Thiruvananthapuram International Airport which is at a distance of 14 km. The nearest railway station is Kazhakuttam railway station.

== Institutions ==
- Technopark
- KINFRA Apparel Park, Menamkulam
- KINFRA Film and Video Park, Chanthavila
- Rajiv Gandhi Institute of Biotechnology
- Regional Women's Training Institute
- Marian Engineering College
- Marian College of Architecture
- Marian Arts& Science College
- Marian Business School
- St. Xavier's College, Thumba
- St. Thomas Institute for Science and Technology
- A. J. School of Nursing

== Major attractions ==
- Vikram Sarabhai Space centre Space Museum – 5 km
- Thumba Beach – 3.5 km
- Greenfield International Stadium – 2 km
- Lulu Mall – 7 km
- Mall of Travancore – 12 km
- Akkulam Tourist Village – 8 km
- Madavoorpara Rock Cut Temple Kattaikonam – 7 km
- Magic Planet – 3 km
- Veli Tourist Village-9Km
- St. Andrews Beach - 4km

== Government offices ==
- Pothencode Block Panchayat Office (Erstwhile Kazhakkottam Block Panchayat)
- Kazhakkottam Village Office
- Kerala State Electricity Board Kazhakkoottam
- Kazhakkoottam Sub Registrar Office
- Kazhakkoottam SRTO Office (Located In Kattaikonam)

== Academic institutions In Kazhakkoottam ==
- Sainik School Kazhakkoottam
- Government HSS, Kazhakkoottam
- Christ Nagar International School
- Galaxy Infant School, Vetturoad
- Jyothis Central School, Kazhakkoottam
- Alan Feldman Public School, Elippakuzhi
- Al Uthuman English Medium School
- Our Public School

 Academic institutions Near Kazhakkoottam

- MGHSS Kaniyapuram
- MHS Kaniyapuram
- Jyothi Nilayam Senior Secondary School, St Andrews
- Bright Central School, Kaniyapuram
- VSSC Central School, Thumba
- St. Thomas Institute for Science & Technology, Chanthavila
- University of Kerala, Kariavattom Campus
- Trivandrum Engineering College, Sreekariyam

== Notable people ==
- Premkumar – Actor
- V. Muraleedharan
- Shobha Surendran
- Kadampalli Surendran
- Adv V. V. Rajesh
- Adv VK Prasanth

== See also ==
- Kaniyapuram
- Chanthavila
- Technopark, Trivandrum
- Thiruvananthapuram Central railway station
