= Thiruvananthapuram North railway station =

Railway station in Kerala, India

Thiruvananthapuram North Railway station (TVCN)
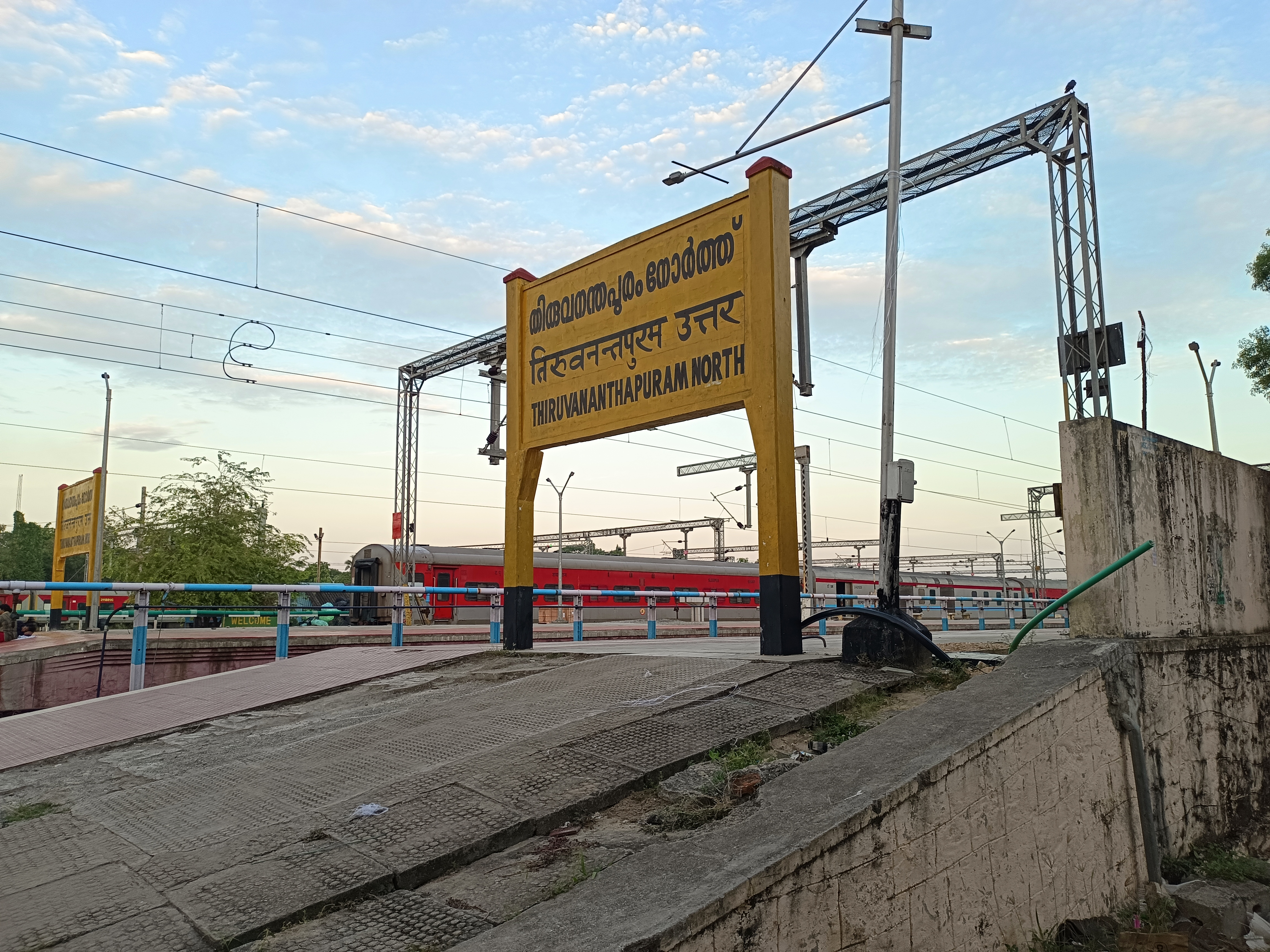
- Name board of Thiruvananthapuram North railway station

General information
- Other names: Kochuveli
- Location: Kochuveli, Thiruvananthapuram, India
- Coordinates: 8.509°N 76.897°E
- Elevation: 10 m (33 ft)
- System: Indian Railways station
- Owner: Indian Railways
- Operator: Southern Railways
- Line: Kollam–Thiruvananthapuram line
- Platforms: 6
- Tracks: 13

Construction
- Structure type: Standard (on-ground station)
- Parking: Available
- Accessible: Disabled access

Other information
- Status: Functioning
- Station code: TVCN
- Zone(s): Southern Railway

History
- Opened: 2005
- Closed: 2019
- Rebuilt: 2022
- Former names: Kochuveli

Passengers
- 60,00000: 4,559 ▲100% (-)
Location
- Location within Kerala Location within India

Thiruvananthapuram North Railway Station (station code: TVCN), formerly Kochuveli railway station (old station code: KCVL), is an NSG–3 category Indian railway station in Thiruvananthapuram railway division of Southern Railway zone. It is a satellite passenger railway station of Thiruvananthapuram. It is being developed to ease congestion at Thiruvananthapuram Central.

Some trains presently operating from Thiruvananthapuram Central, including the Sabari Express, will commence the journey from Thiruvananthapuram North railway station once the station is completely developed. Thiruvananthapuram North railway station also caters to special trains during busy seasons. The trains connect this station to cities like New Delhi, Amritsar, Chandigarh, Rishikesh, Hubli, Bengaluru, Mangaluru, Mysuru, Madgaon, Bhavnagar, Porbandar, Mumbai, Ahmedabad, Indore, Surat, Nilambur, Jodhpur, Sri Ganganagar and Nagercoil.

== Facilities ==
- One Foot Overbridge with elevator facility on PF4.
- Computerised Reservation Ticket Counter
- Computerised Unreserved Ticket Counter
- Public Address System

== Accessibility ==
The station is situated 1.2 km from the NH 66 Thiruvananthapuram–Kanyakumari bypass road and 8 km from Central bus station Thiruvananthapuram. Kerala State Road Transport Corporation operates a low-floor AC feeder bus from Thiruvananthapuram North terminal to Thiruvananthapuram city for the benefit of long-distance passengers. The buses are operated from the station at timings based on train arrivals. The nearest bus stop on the NH 66 Kazhakoottam–Kovalam bypass road is World Market Junction from where commuters can use the Kerala State Road Transport Corporation buses towards various places in Thiruvananthapuram city and Kazhakoottam.

== Future developments at Thiruvananthapuram North Terminal ==
A pedestrian overbridge connecting platforms on the eastern and the western sides is long-awaited. Platforms 2 and 3 are now fully operational. Thiruvananthapuram North, the satellite terminal of Thiruvananthapuram, is also poised for growth, with the present six platforms and a total of ten once fully developed. The coach care centre, which is undergoing construction, is yet to be completed. Construction of a sickline complex and two pit lines is expected to be completed by May 2025.

== See also ==
- Thiruvananthapuram Central
- Thiruvananthapuram South railway station
- Thiruvananthapuram Pettah
- Kazhakuttam
- Veli
