= Thiruvananthapuram Central railway station =

Railway station in Thiruvananthapuram, Kerala, India

Thiruvananthapuram Central
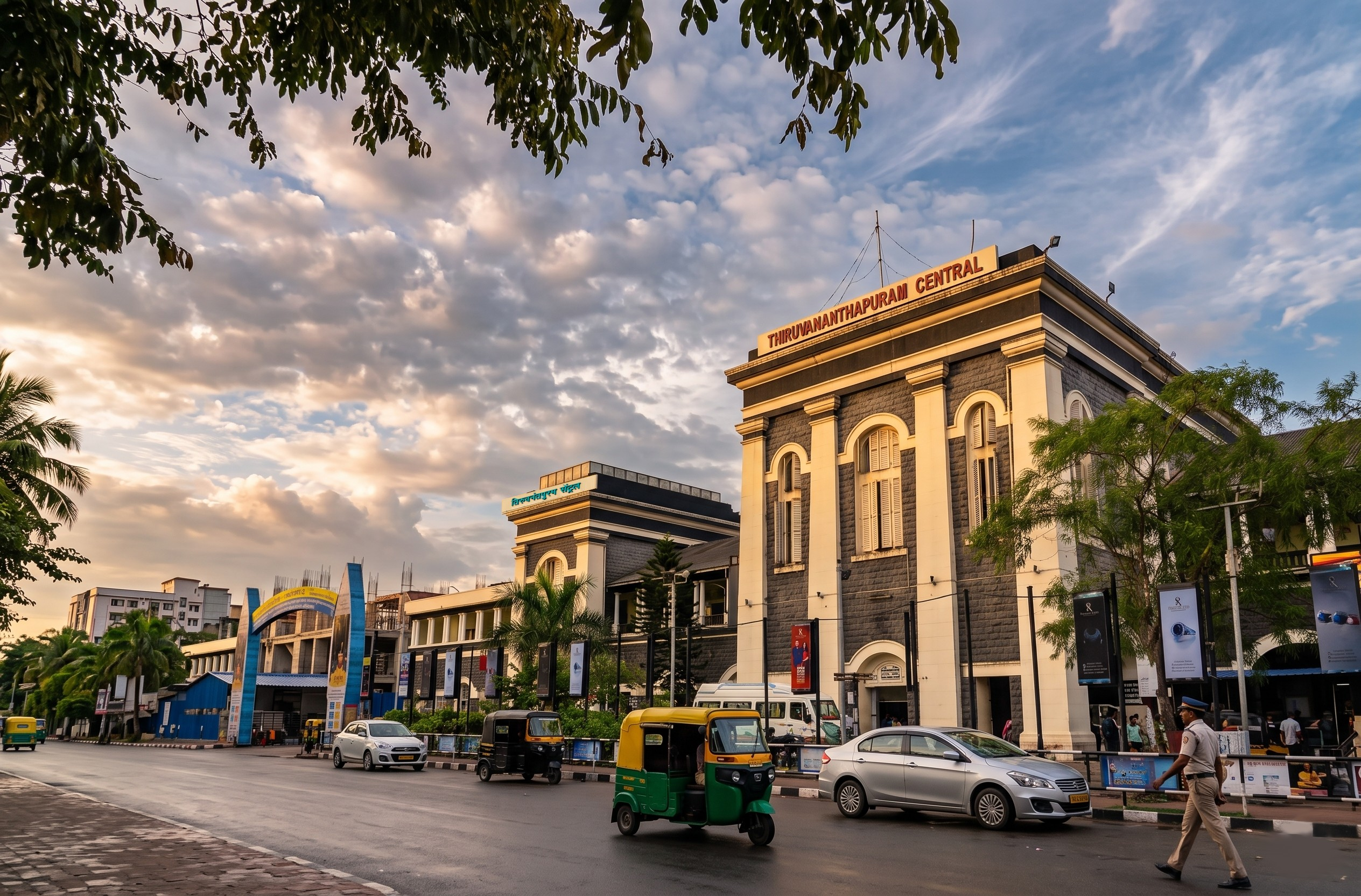
- Thiruvananthapuram Central main building.

General information
- Other names: Thambanoor Railway Station
- Location: Thampanoor, Thiruvananthapuram, Kerala, India 🇮🇳
- Coordinates: 8.4874°N 76.952°E
- Elevation: 6.740 metres (22.11 ft)
- System: Indian Railways station
- Owner: Indian Railways
- Operator: Southern Railways Thiruvananthapuram Division
- Lines: Kollam–Thiruvananthapuram trunk line Thiruvananthapuram–Nagercoil–Kanyakumari line
- Platforms: 5
- Tracks: 16
- Connections: , taxi stand, pre-paid auto service

Construction
- Structure type: Standard (on ground station)
- Parking: Available
- Accessible: Disabled access

Other information
- Status: Functioning
- Station code: TVC
- Zone(s): Southern Railway zone
- Division(s): Thiruvananthapuram

History
- Opened: 4 November 1931; 95 years ago
- Closed: 1940
- Rebuilt: 1955, 2025 (Planned)
- Electrified: Yes (since 2005 December)
- Former names: Travancore Central

Passengers
- 2017–19: 40,908 per day Annual passengers – 14,292,407
- Rank: 1 (in Kerala); 1 (in Thiruvananthapuram railway division)
Location
- Location within Kerala Location within India
- Interactive map

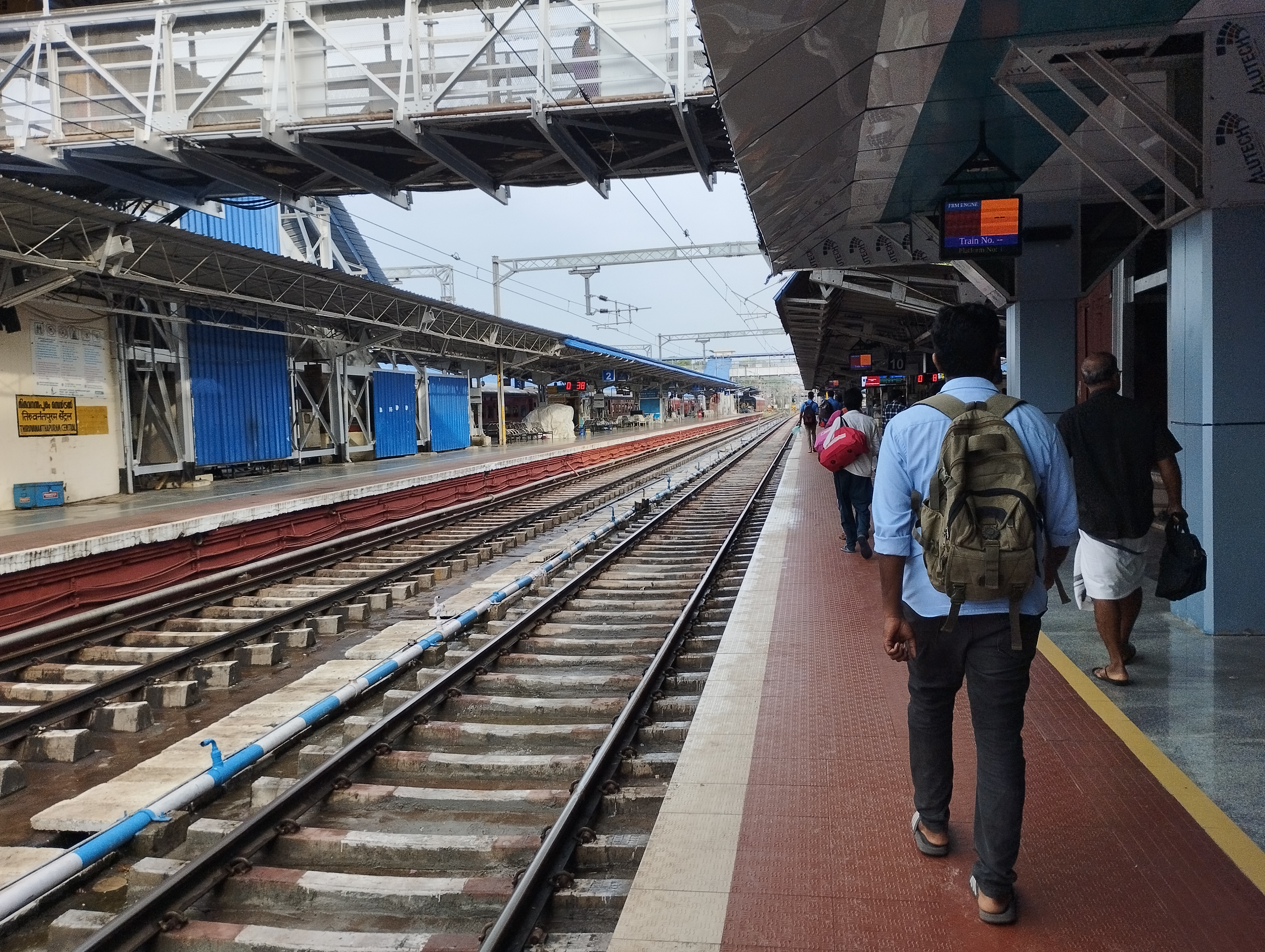
Triavandrum Railway Station Platform 1

Thiruvananthapuram Central (station code: TVC) is an NSG–2 category railway station in Thiruvananthapuram railway division of Southern Railway zone. It is a major railway station that serves the city of Thiruvananthapuram, the capital of Kerala. It is Kerala's busiest railway station. The station building, a landmark of the city, is located in Thampanoor opposite the central bus stand. Thiruvananthapuram Central railway station is the highest profit earning railway station in Kerala and the most crowded and busiest railway station in Kerala. Most high priority and superfast express trains originate from here like TVC Rajdhani Express.

A number of long-distance trains depart from Thiruvananthapuram Central. Thiruvananthapuram is the first tier-2 city in the south along India's longest train routes: the Kanyakumari–Thiruvananthapuram–Dibrugarh Vivek Express route and the Kanyakumari–Thiruvananthapuram–Jammu Tawi–Shri Mata Vaishno Devi Katra Himsagar Express route. A second terminal (the South Terminal) was opened in 2004 to handle passenger traffic, and the West Terminal opened in 2007. To reduce congestion, the station has 16 tracks.

== History ==
The Madras–Quilon line was extended to Thiruvananthapuram, the capital of the princely state of Travancore, and was opened on 4 January 1918. The line terminated at Chackai, the trading centre of Thiruvananthapuram. M. E. Watts, dewan of Travancore, extended the rail line to the heart of the city. The terminus was moved to its present location at Thiruvananthapuram Central in 1931. The station was built during the reign of Sethu Lakshmi Bayi, the maharani of Travancore, and was inaugurated on 4 November 1931. No bricks were used for the station's construction; it was built with rock masonry. Thiruvananthapuram was a branch-line station, but the maharani built it on a par with its counterparts in India's major cities. The station was built to handle two departures per day in 1931, and had one platform. The single-line platform continued until the 1970s; the extended platform accommodated trains as a metre-gauge line until the gauge conversion. The platform could accommodate two trains at a time.

== Layout ==
The station has five platforms to handle long and short-distance trains, and two entrances. The main entrance is opposite the central bus station, and the west entrance is on Power House Road. The train-care centre is adjacent to this entrance. The Nemom and Kochuveli stations were announced in the railway budget as satellite terminals of Thiruvananthapuram Central. The Kochuveli satellite terminal has begun operation with trains originating from Thiruvananthapuram Central.

== Security ==
Thiruvananthapuram Central was Kerala's first station to install video surveillance. A networked electronic surveillance system was installed by the Railway Protection Force (RPF) to improve security and monitor passengers arriving at the station.

== Future plans ==
The conversion of Thiruvananthapuram Central to world-class standards was announced in the railway budget. Former Union Minister for Railways Lalu Prasad laid the foundation stone for the station's expansion and modernization in December 2006. Tenders were invited for feasibility studies for the project. More than ₹1 billion (US$11 million) was needed for the first phase of this project. A new complex will be built, covering 1,000,000 square feet (93,000 m^{2}), and modern facilities (including an office and commercial complex) are planned. A proposed passenger terminal at Nemom was announced in the rail budget, but work has not yet begun. It is estimated that a consortium would be needed for the Thiruvananthapuram Central expansion, due to the size of the project..Nemom Terminus Project Construction Started just in this year

== Major trains ==
Popular trains originating or terminating at Thiruvananthapuram Central
Train no	Train name	Remarks
12431 / 12432	Thiruvananthapuram Rajdhani Express	Longest-running Rajdhani Express; Travels the third-longest non-stop run of Indian Railways (457 km in 6 hours) between Hazrat Nizamuddin and Kota.
20634 / 20633	Kasaragod Vande Bharat Express	First Vande Bharat Express train in Kerala
20632 / 20631	Mangaluru Vande Bharat Express	Second Vande Bharat Express train in Kerala
16122 / 16121	Amrit Bharat Express	Thiruvananthapuram Central to Chennai Amrit Bharat Express
12625 / 12626	Kerala Express	Train connecting India's capital city (New Delhi) to Kerala's capital city(Thiruvanathapuram)
12643 / 12644	Swarna Jayanti Express	Longest-running Swarna Jayanti Superfast Express
12624 / 12623	Thiruvananthapuram–Chennai Mail	Started service in 1944 from Madras Central to Cochin Harbour Terminus, later extended to Trivandrum in 1977.; It was the second express train running through Kerala and the first from south Kerala at the time of commencement of service.; Only mail express train currently having service in Kerala.; A best seller comedy thriller film named No.20 Madras Mail released in 1990 was recorded within the moving train.
20630 / 20629	Sabari Express	Started as Mail/Express between Hyderabad Deccan and Cochin Harbour Terminus railway station in April 1987.; Extended to Thiruvananthapuram Central in March 2005.; Upgraded to Superfast Express in September 2025.
16302 / 16301	Venad Express	One of the oldest daily intercity trains in Kerala (started service in 1972).
12507 / 12508	Aronai Express	Longest-running Superfast train; Least punctual long-distance train (average delay on a trip is about 10–12 hours)

== Incident ==
A shunting engine trailed through at point 57A near the relay interlocking cabin and damaged the point and signal gears in the Thiruvananthapuram Central yard in 2018. There were no casualties.

== Gallery ==
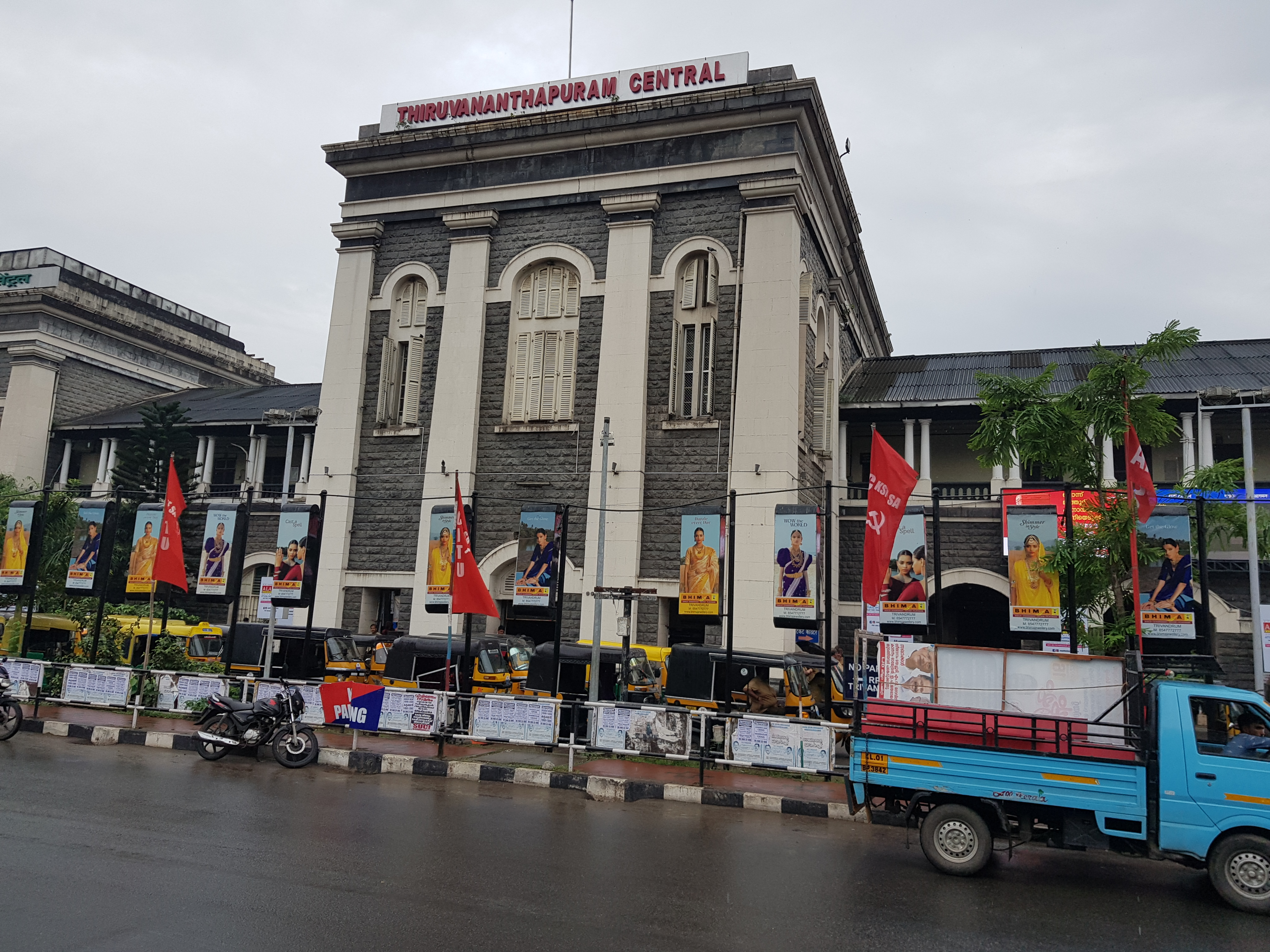
The station

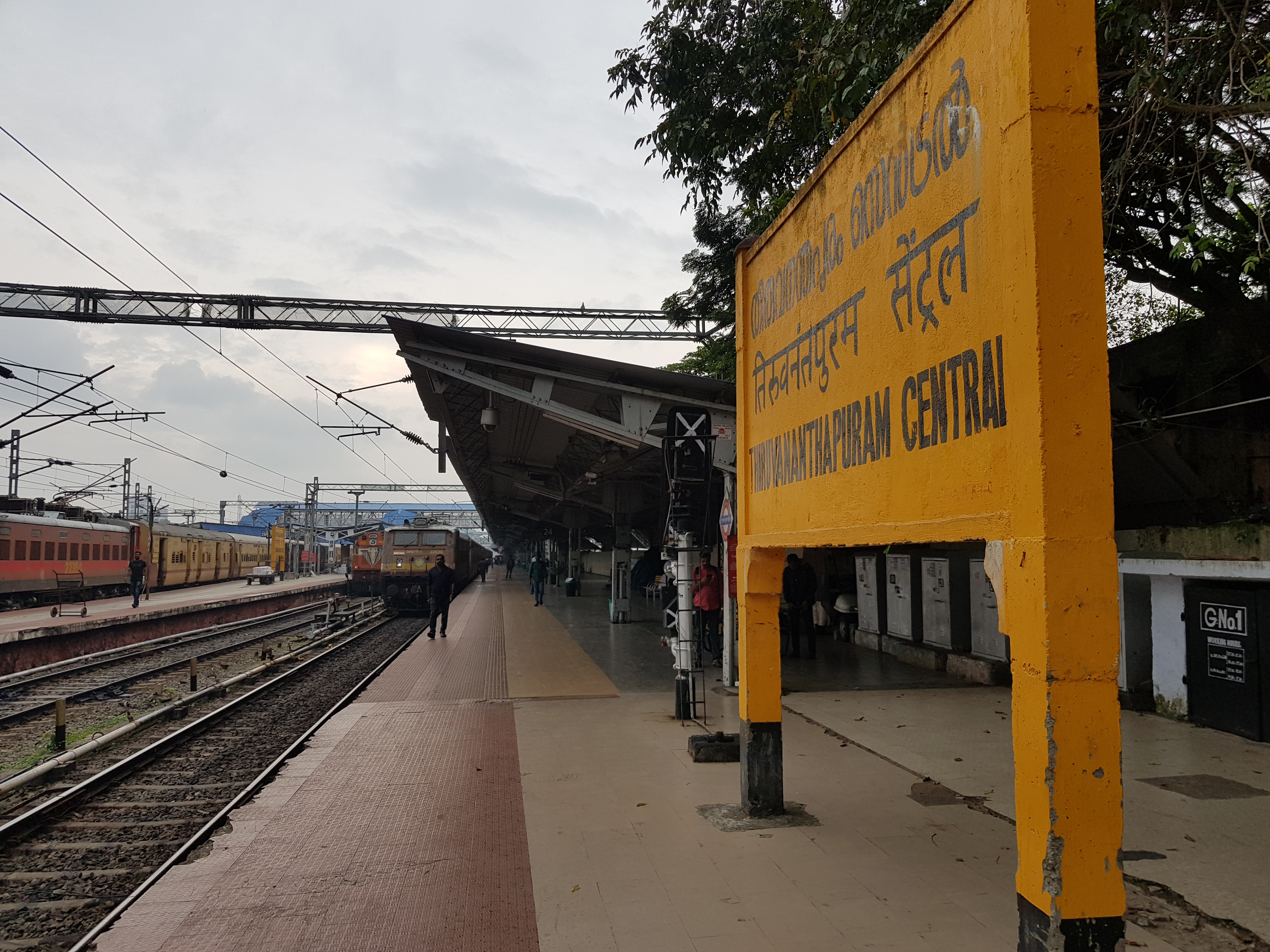
Trackside

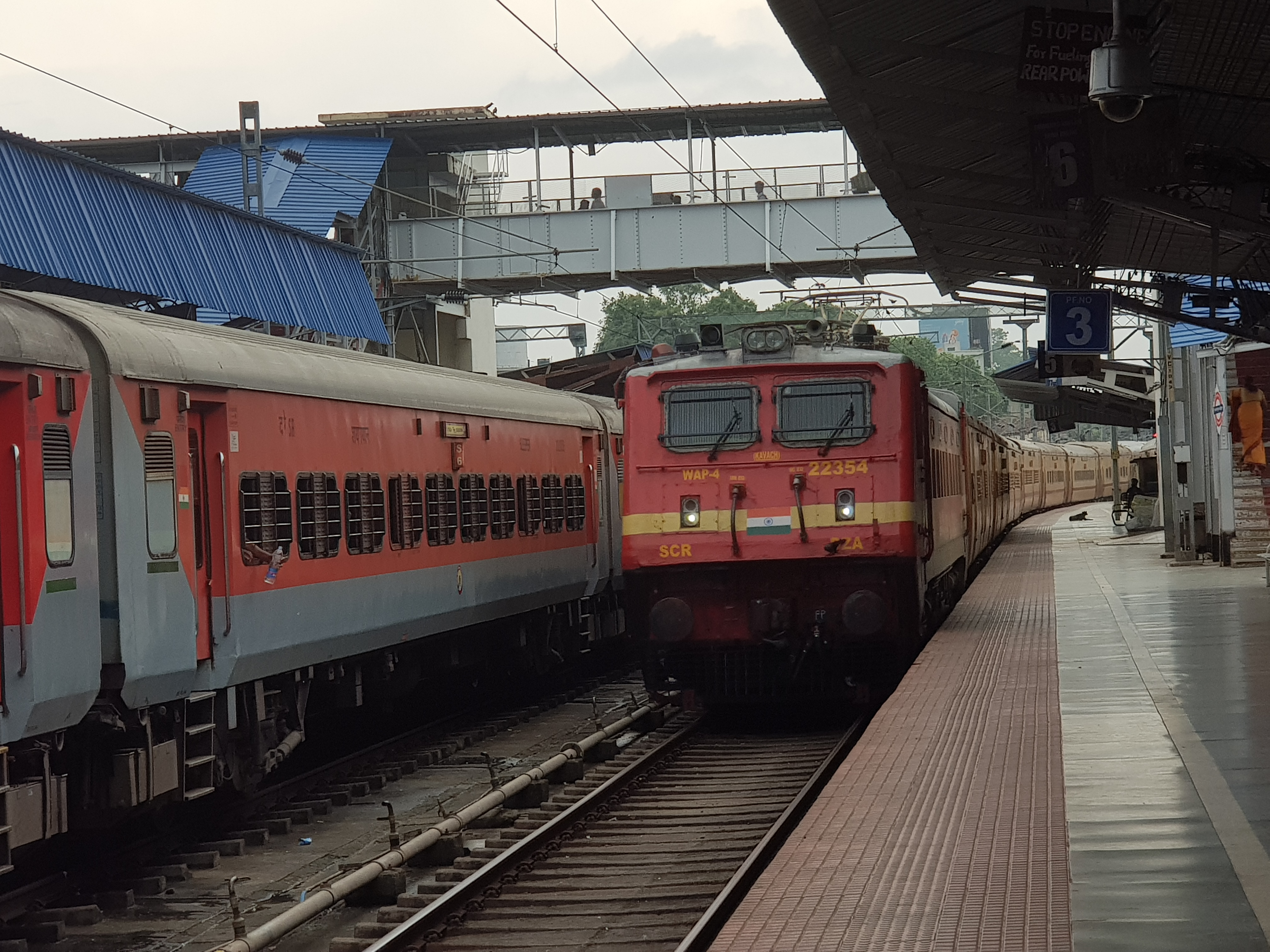
Train entering the station

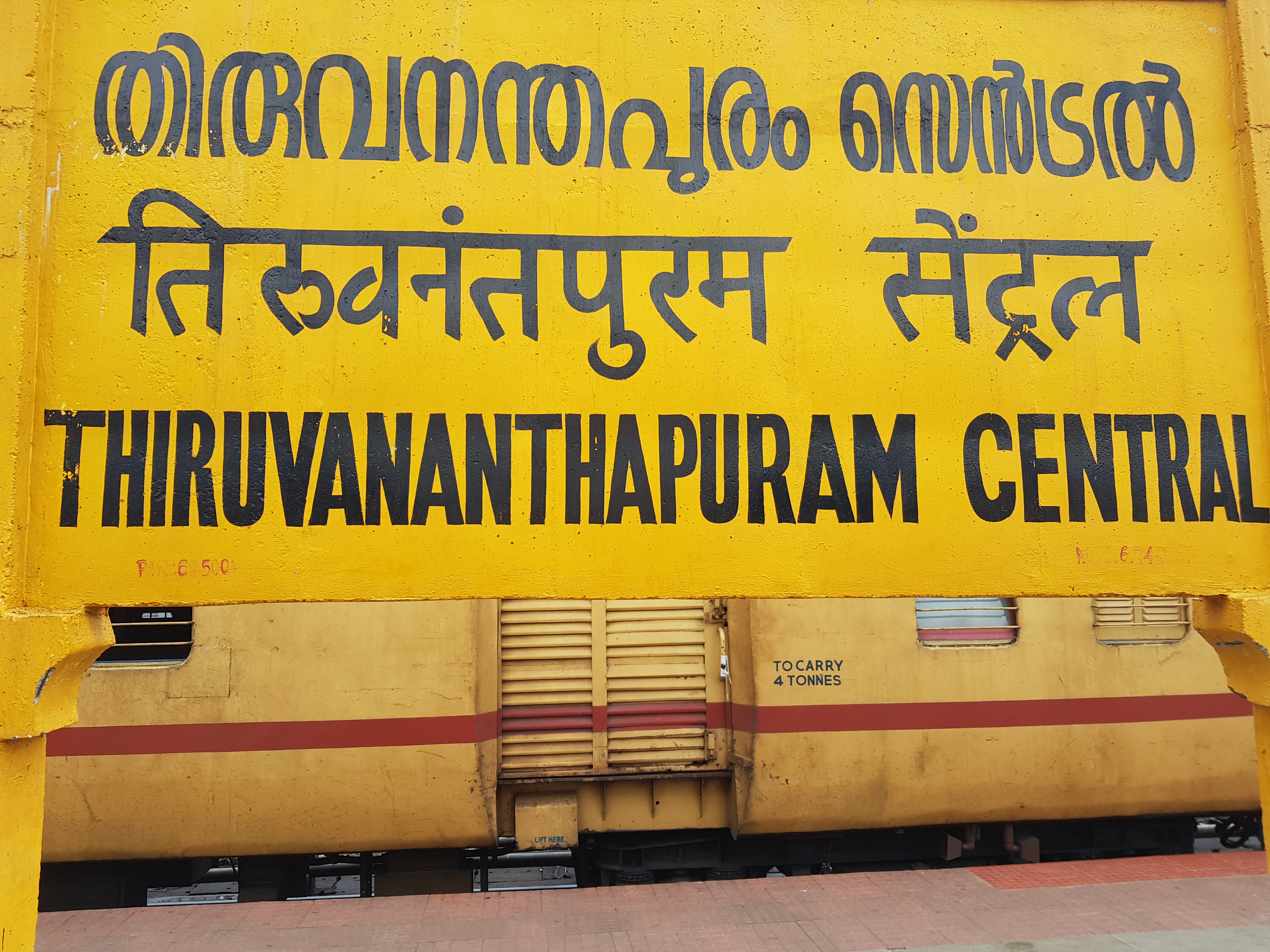
Signage

== See also ==
- Thiruvananthapuram North
- Thiruvananthapuram South
- Ernakulam Junction
