= Shankumugham Beach =

Important beach in Trivandrum

Shankhumugham Beach
- Beach
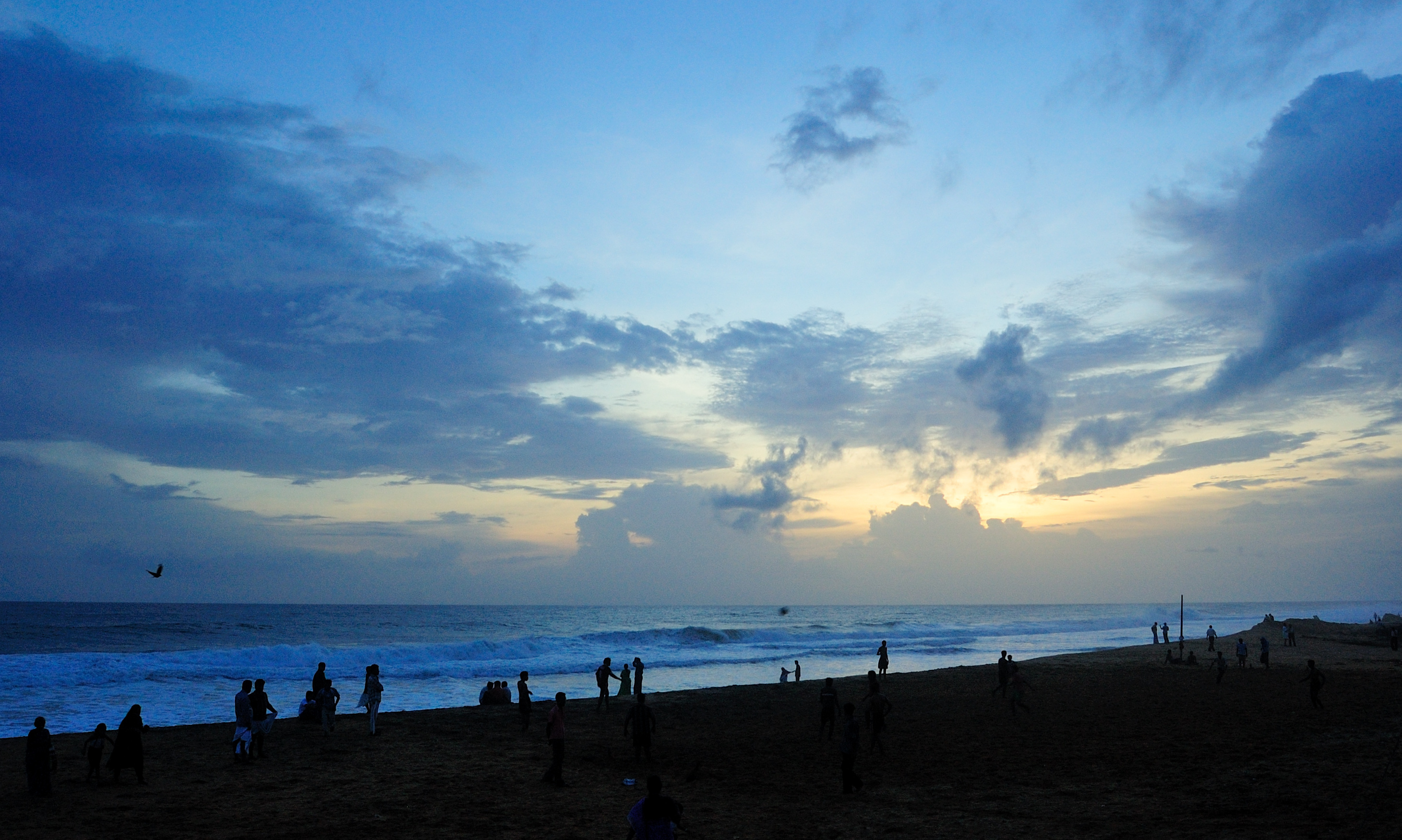
- Shankumugham beach, Thiruvananthapuram

- Location within Kerala
- Coordinates: 8.48112950°N 76.91237030°E
- Location: Thiruvananthapuram, Kerala, India
- Patrolled by: Kerala Police; Beach Lifeguards

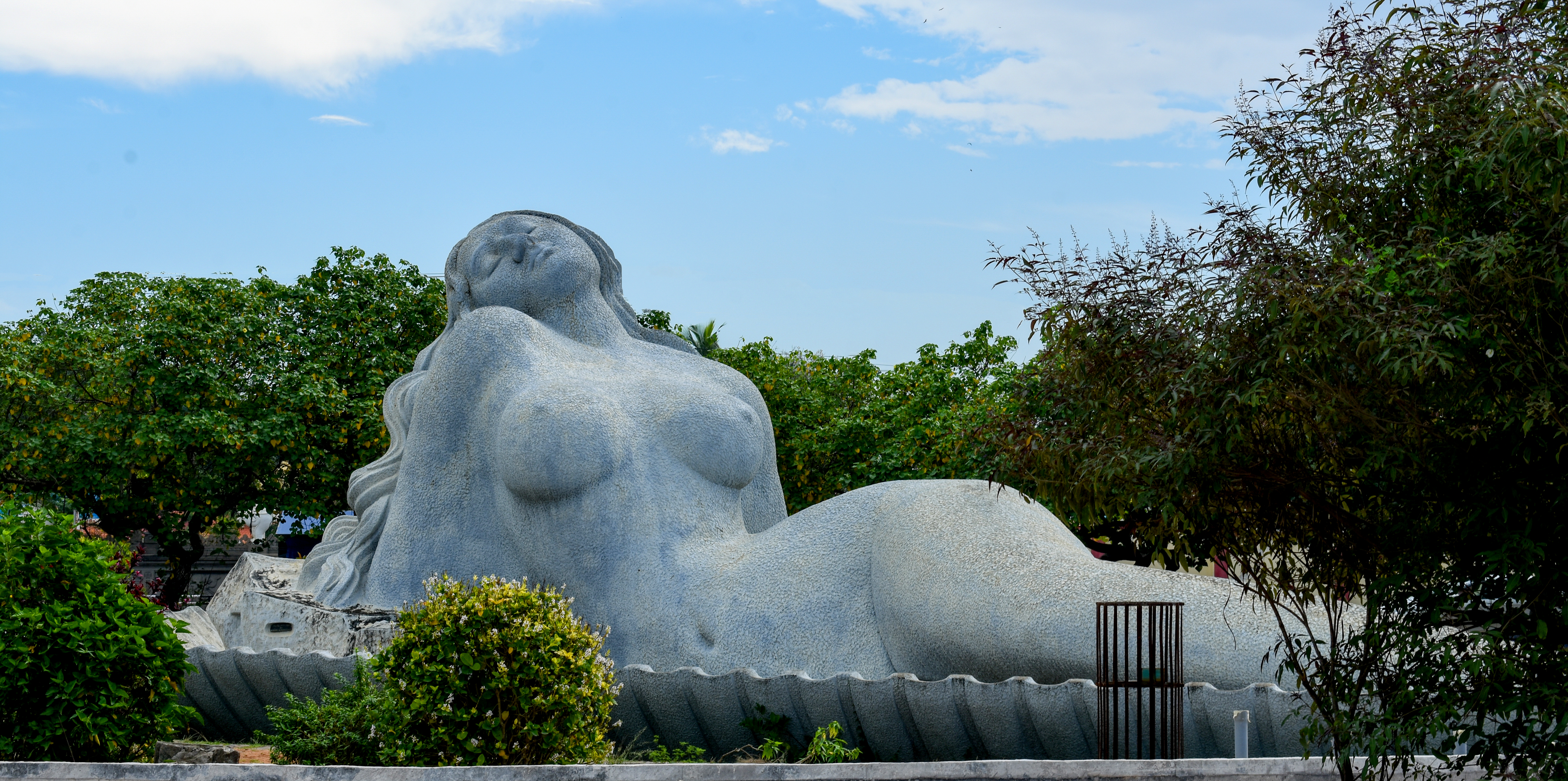
Sagarakanyaka at Shankumughom beach at Thiruvananthapuram

Shankumugham Beach is a beach in Thiruvananthapuram district of Kerala, south India. The beach is on the western side of Thiruvananthapuram and is very close to Thiruvananthapuram International Airport.

Shanghumugham beach is considered as the ‘Arattukadavu’ of Sri Ananthapadmanabhan - the presiding deity of the city. Thousands of Hindus perform ‘Bali Tharpanam’ during special occasions. Shankhumugham is the prime location for Ganesh Nimarjan at the time of Ganesh Chaturthi.

On the Arattu day at Thiruvananthapuram, idols of Lord Padmanabhaswamy, Lord Narasimha, and Lord Krishna are taken in procession to the Laccadive Sea at Shanghumugham beach. His Highness the now-titular Maharaja of Travancore leads the procession with the royal sword in hand while escorted by members of the royal family, armed guards, temple authorities, mounted police, and officers. After the ceremonial bath at Shanghumugham, the idols are taken back in procession, thus marking the conclusion of the festival.

The sculpture of Sagarakanyaka, a mermaid, by Kanayi Kunhiraman is an added attraction. This giant statue is more than 35 metres long. The 'Jawaharlal Nehru Park of Traffic signs for children' is situated here, which is helpful for the children to understand the traffic rules while playing in the park. The park also provides cycling facilities for small children.

The military area of Southern Air Command of the Indian Air Force and part of the main airport are situated near Shankumugham Beach.

== Coastal erosion and effect on the beach ==
Coastal erosion along the Thiruvananthapuram coastline has caused significant reduction in the beach area. A study from 2022 found that the region including the Shankumugham beach observed an erosion of 4.73 meters per year. The Shankumugham-Airport road along the beach was closed due to excessive erosion.

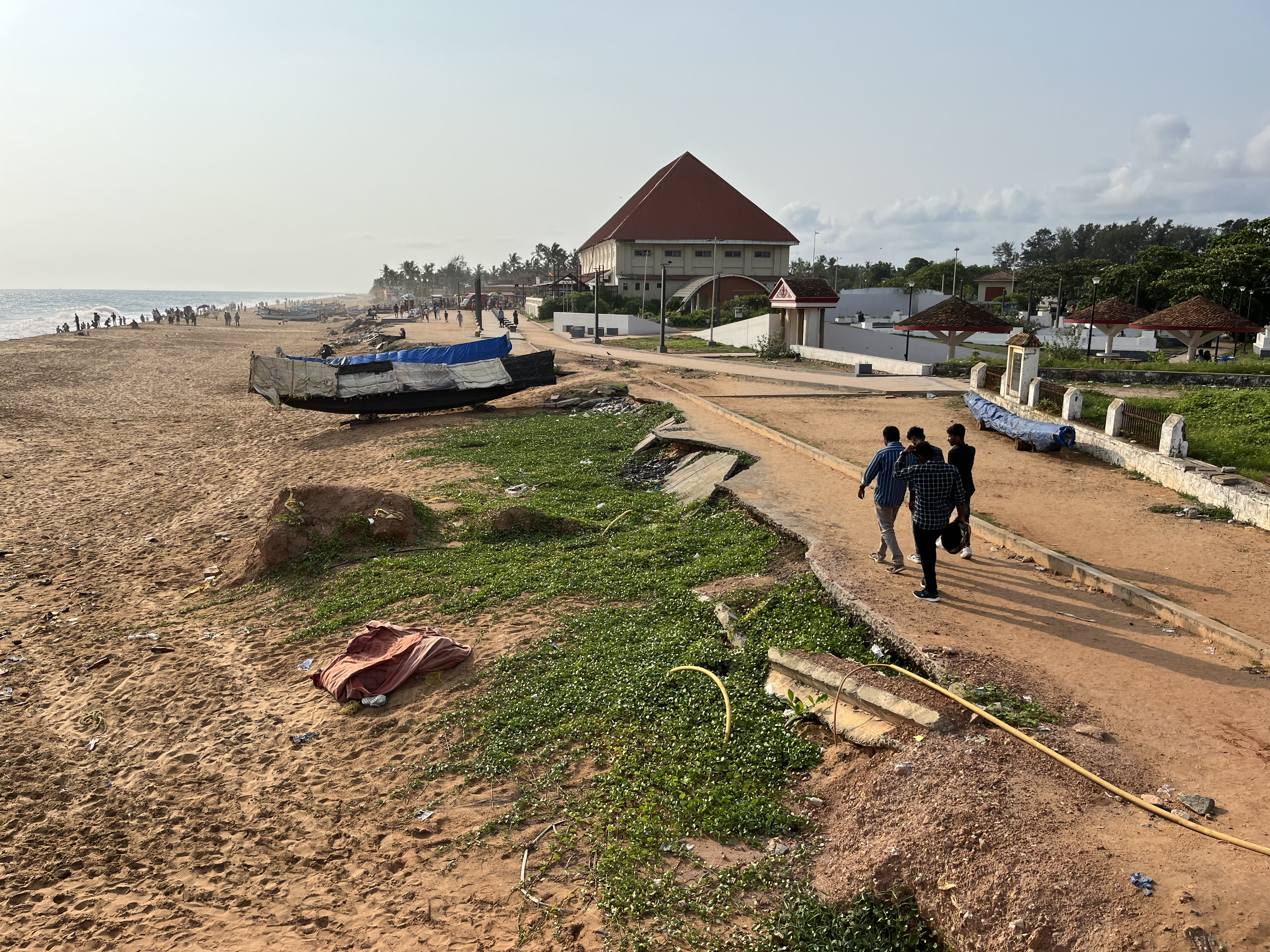
Remains of the Shankumugham airport road after sea erosion

== See also ==
Thiruvananthapuram Tourist spots

== How to reach ==
- Nearest city - Thiruvananthapuram - 8 km
- Nearest railway station - Thiruvananthapuram Central and Kochuveli railway station
- Nearest airport - Thiruvananthapuram International Airport
- Nearest bus station - Central Bus Station Thiruvananthapuram

== Picture gallery ==
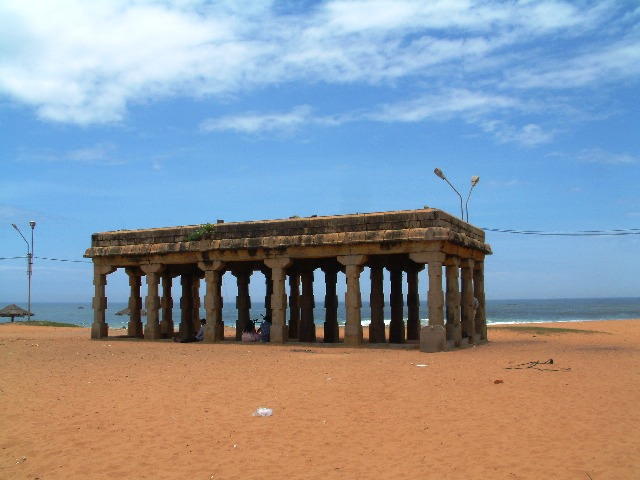
Aaratu Mandapam

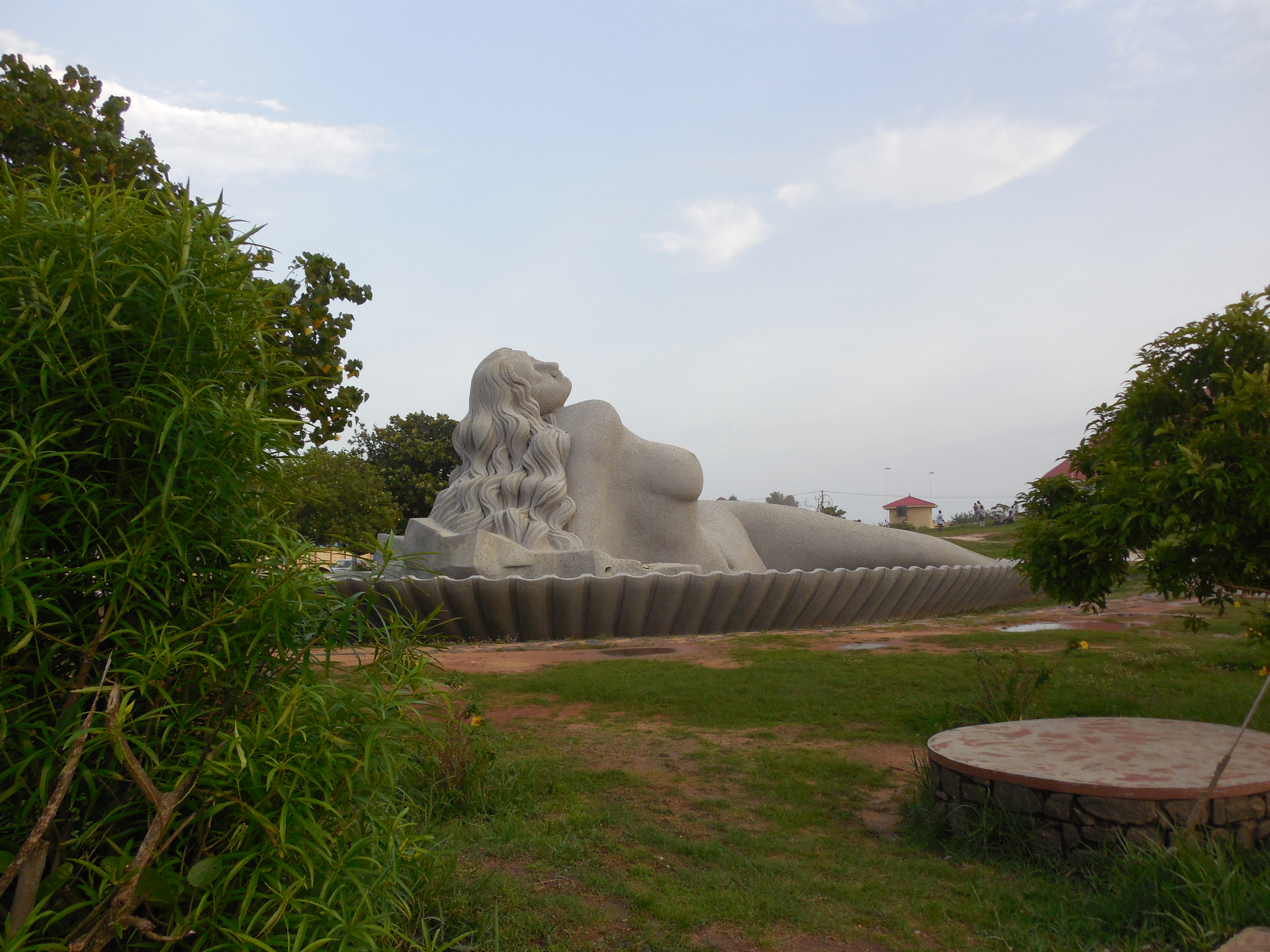
Sagarakanyaka or Jalakanyaka

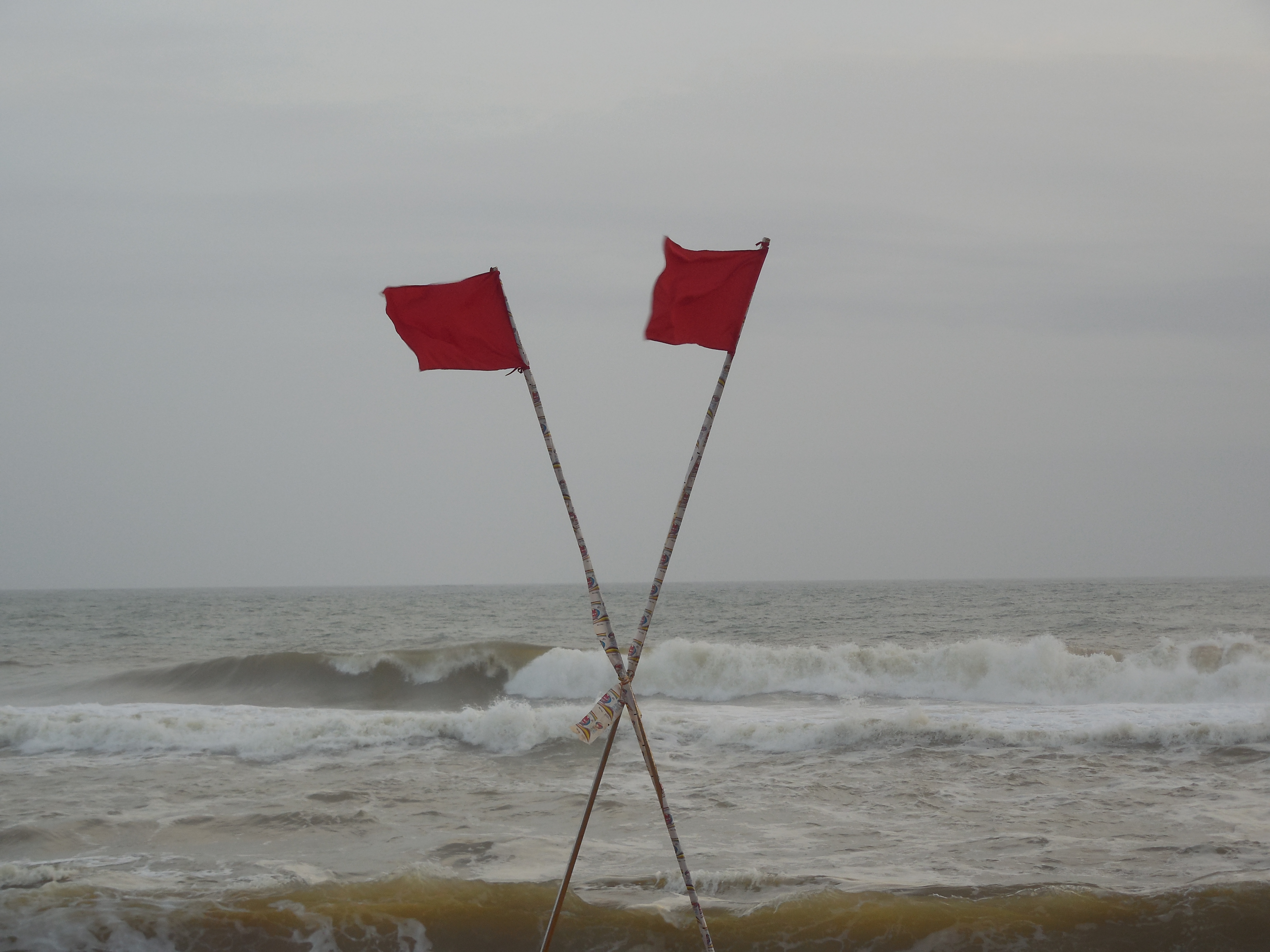
High tide warning at the beach during one of the monsoon days

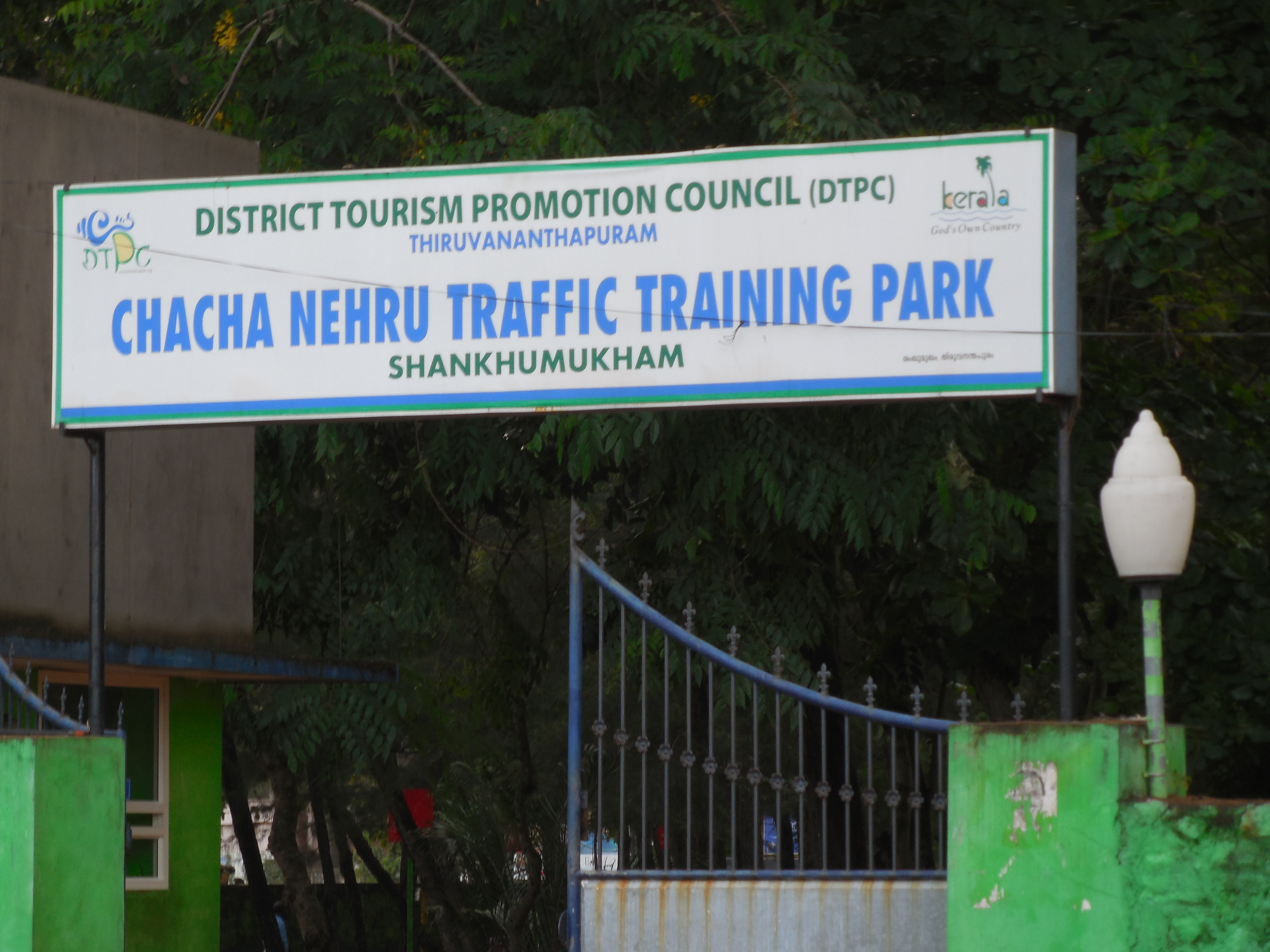
Chacha Nehru Traffic Training Park

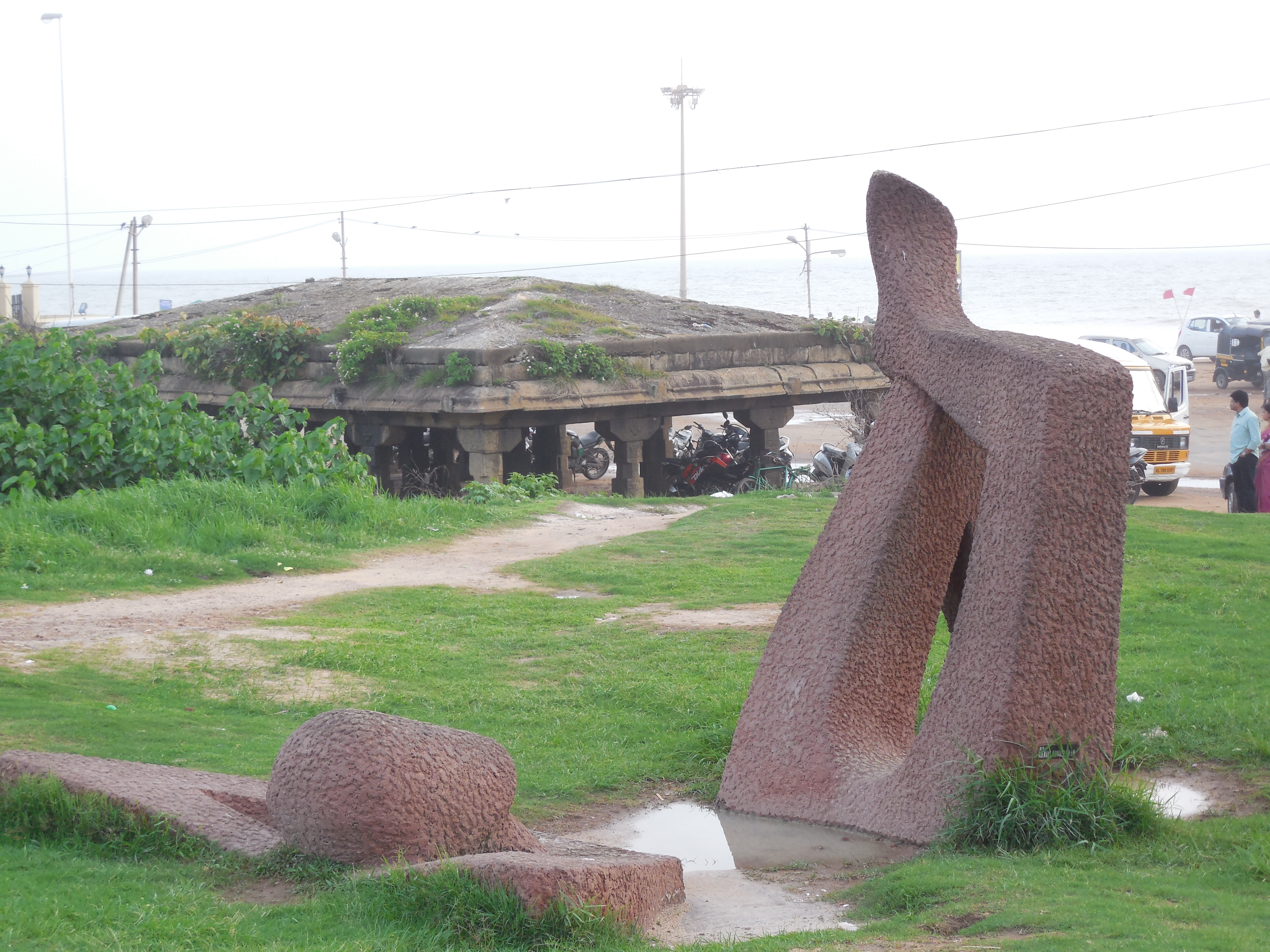
A sculpture at the beach

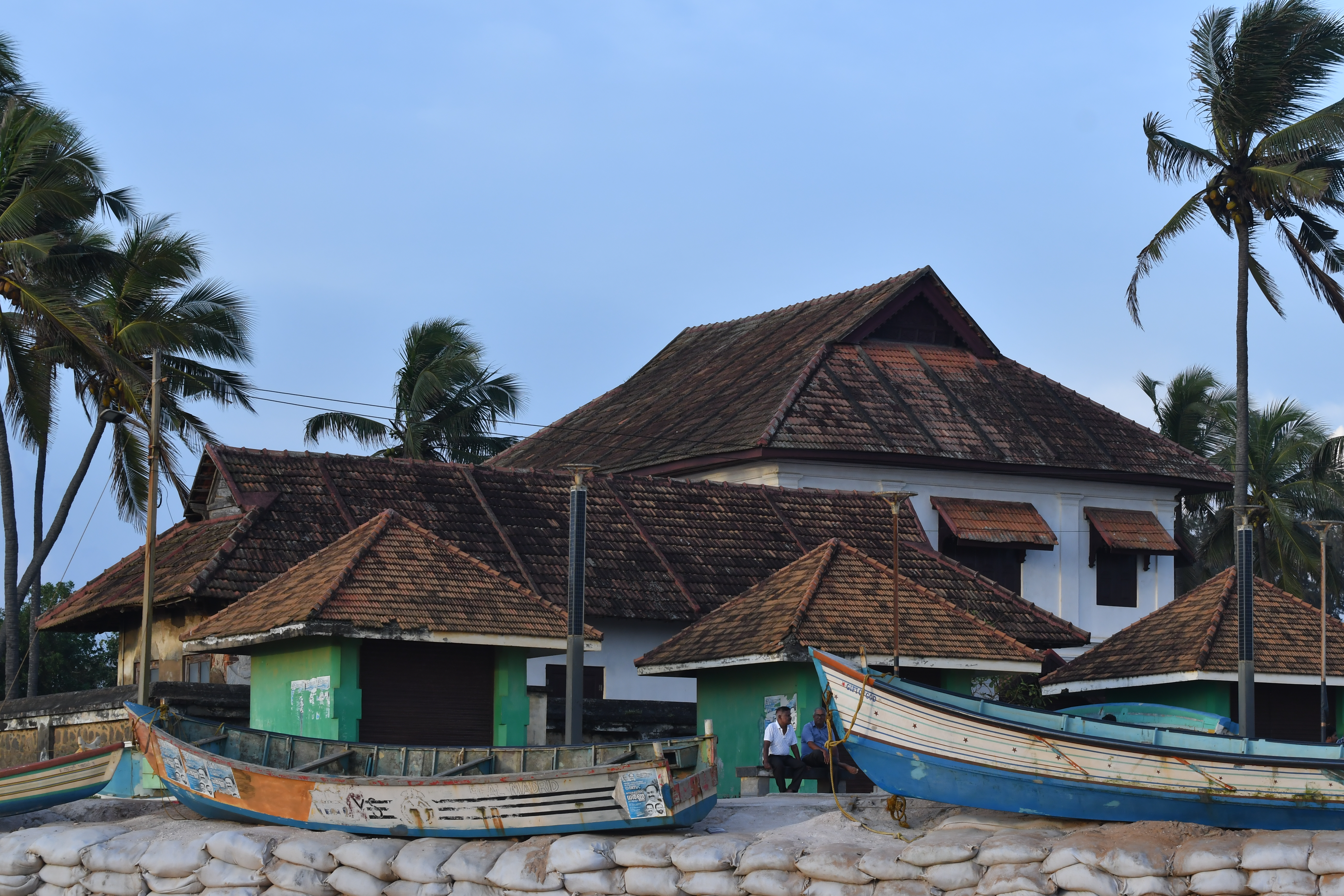
