= Aakkulam =

- Location in Thiruvananthapuram City, India Aakkulam (India)
- Coordinates: 8°31′39″N 76°54′30″E
- Country: India
- State: Kerala

Government
  - Body: Thiruvananthapuram Corporation

Languages
  - Official: Malayalam, English
- Time zone: UTC+5:30 (IST)
- Vehicle registration: KL- 22

Aakkulam is a region in Thiruvananthapuram city, the capital of Kerala state in India. It is about 10 km from Thiruvananthapuram city center. situated where the Akkulam Lake joins the sea.

Akkulam Tourist village and Akkulam Boat Club are the major picnic spots in the area. The LuLu Mall Thiruvananthapuram mall is located near it. A small park was recently built near the lake for recreational activities. In 2025, the Aakkulam-Chettuva stretch of the West Coast Waterway was scheduled for commissioning, aiming to establish a new passenger boat route from the lake.

The Southern Air Command of the Indian Air Force is located at Aakkulam.

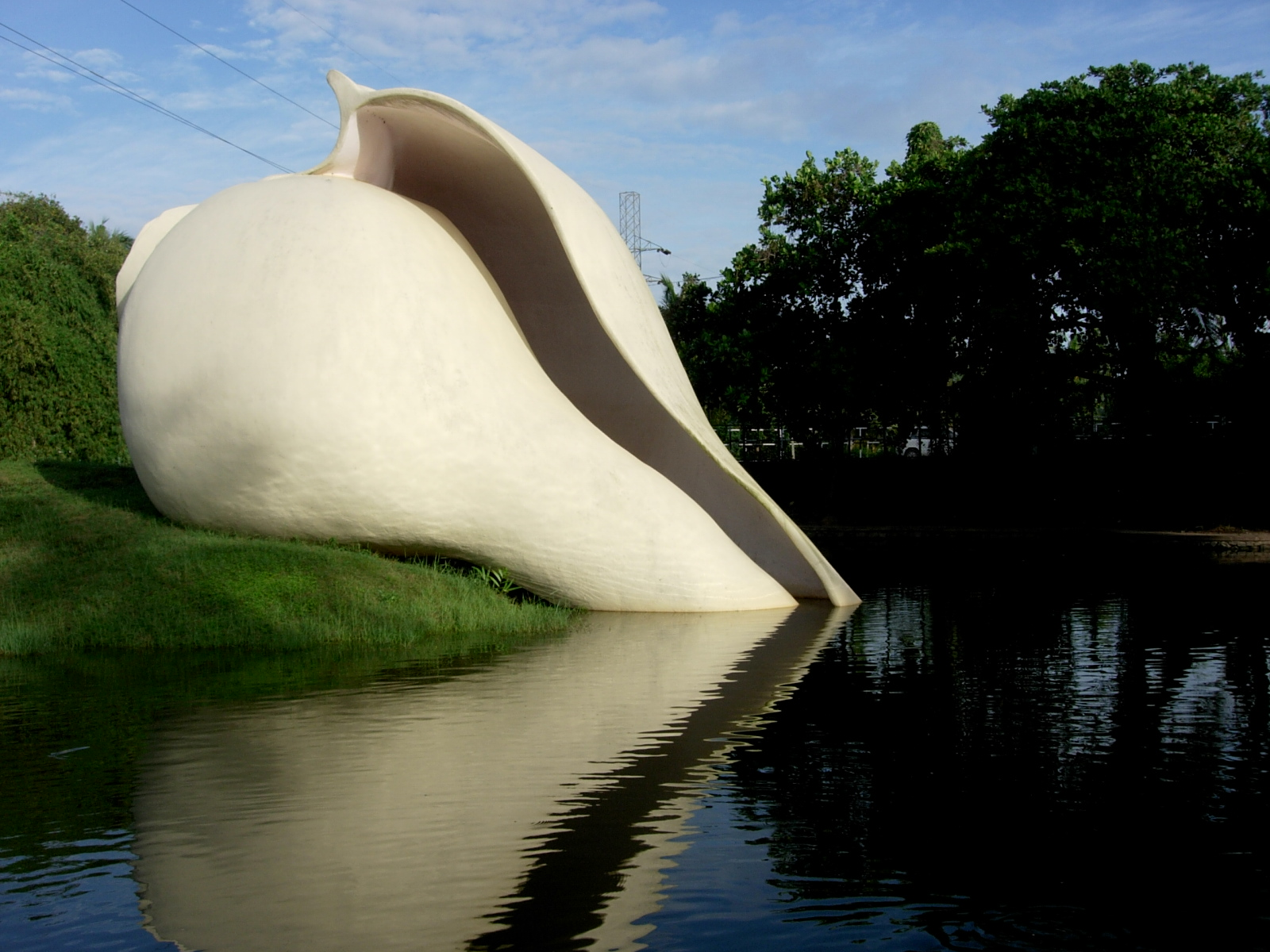
A sculpture at the Akkulam tourism village.

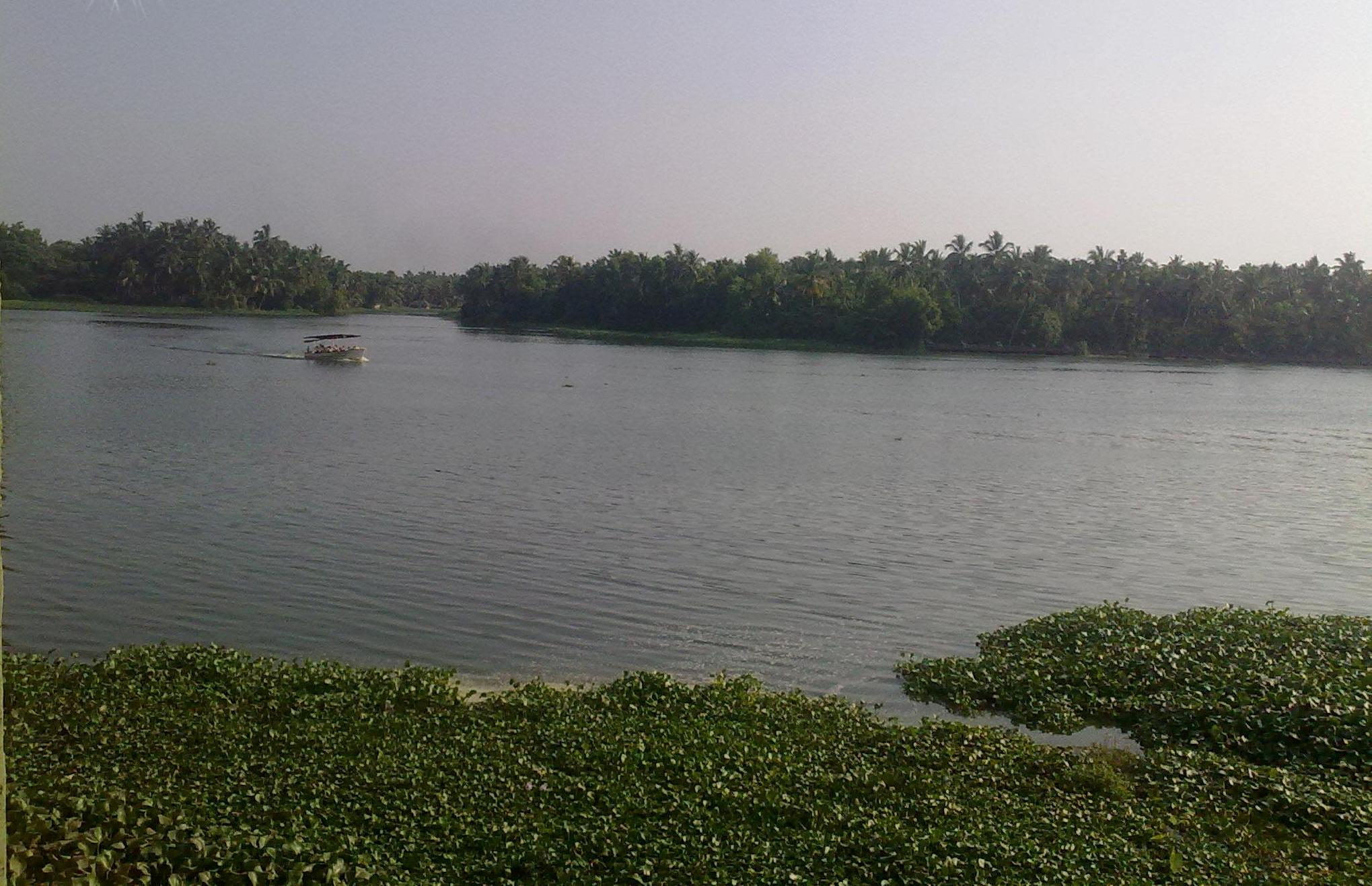
Aakkulam lake

== See also ==
- Tourism in Thiruvananthapuram
- Tourism in Kerala
- Ulloor
