= Kanayi Kunhiraman =

Indian sculptor (b. 1937)

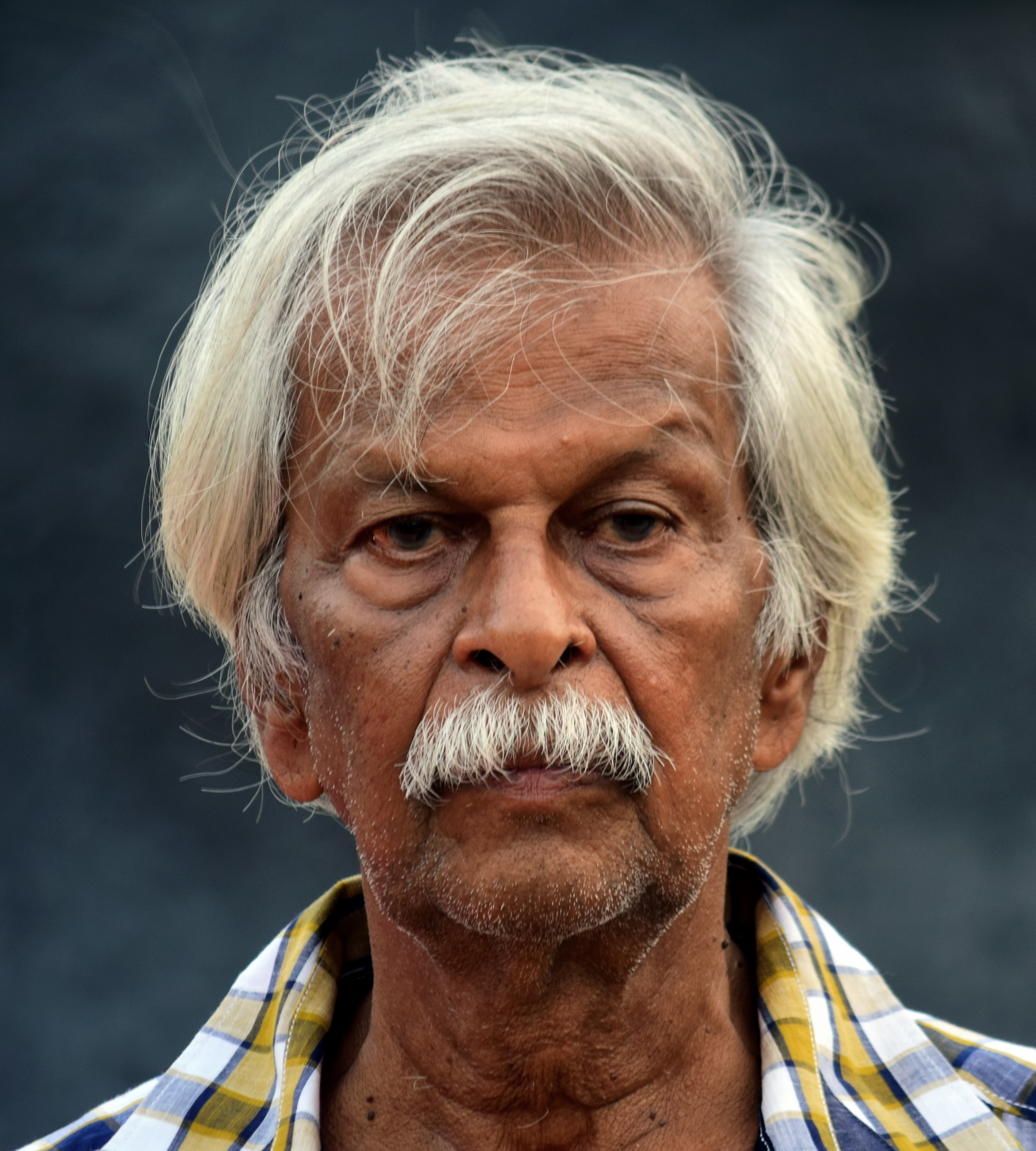
- Kunhiraman in 2019
- Born: 25 July 1937 (age 88); Kuttamath, Kasaragod district, Kerala, British India
- Occupation: Sculptor
- Years active: 1960–present
- Notable work: Tamilnadu Woman; Malampuzha Yakshi; Sagarakanyaka; Mukkola Perumal
- Spouse: Nalini
- Awards: Raja Ravi Varma Award 2005; Thikkurissy Award 2006; MS Nanjunda Rao National Award 2018
- Website: www.kanayikunhiraman.com

Kanayi Kunhiraman (born 25 July 1937) is an Indian sculptor, best known for his outsize sculptures such as Yakshi of Malampuzha Dam Gardens, Sagarakanyaka at Shankumugham Beach and Mukkola Perumal trinity in Kochi. Taught by K. C. S. Paniker, he is a former chairman of the Lalit Kala Academy, India's national academy of fine arts. The Government of Kerala awarded him the inaugural Raja Ravi Varma Award in 2005. He is also a recipient of the Thikkurissy Award and the inaugural MS Nanjunda Rao National Award of the Karnataka Chitrakala Parishath. In 2022, he was honoured with Kerala Sree Award, third highest civilian award given by the Government of Kerala.

== Biography ==
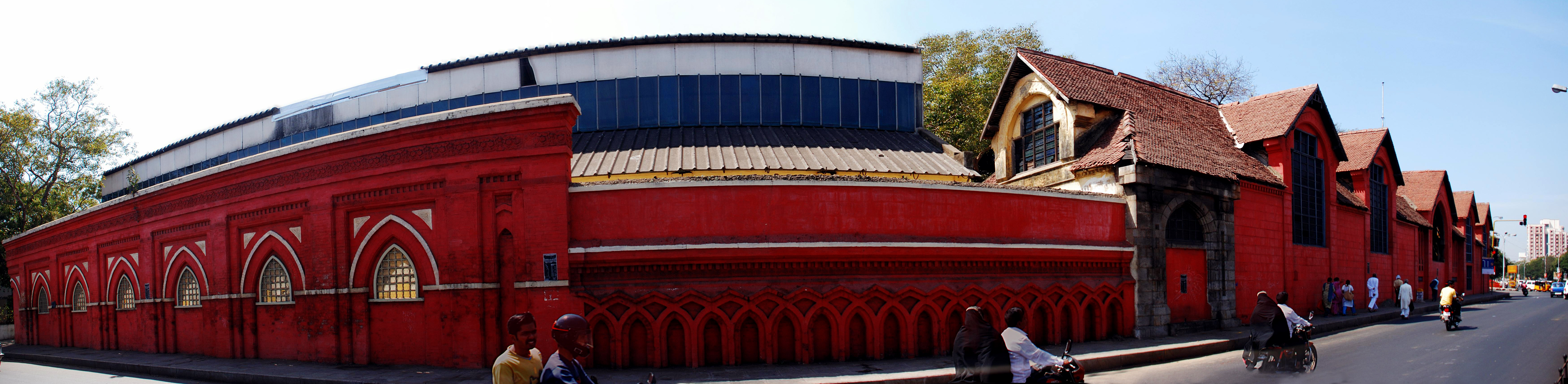
Government College of Fine Arts, Chennai

Kunhiraman was born on 25 July 1937 at Kuttamath in Hosdurg Taluk of Kanhangad in Kasaragod District of the south Indian state of Kerala. After early schooling at the local schools in Kuttamath and Puthaott, he joined Raja's high school, Nileshwaram to pass the Secondary School Leaving Certificate examination in 1957. A teacher at his school, by name Krishnan Kutty, encouraged him to pursue his artistic interests but he did not get encouragement from his family which forced him to flee home to Chennai where he studied sculpture at the Government College of Fine Arts, Chennai. It was during his days here, Kunhiraman had the opportunity to come in contact with K. C. S. Paniker who was a faculty and later, the principal of the institution. After completing the course, he worked as a part-time teacher at Ethiraj College for Women from 1961 but when he received the Commonwealth Scholarship, he moved to England to study at the Slade School of Fine Art in 1965; he spent three years at the school. On his return to Kerala, he undertook a number of assignments and in 1976, he was invited to head the department of sculpture of the College of Fine Arts Trivandrum; he would also serve the institution as its principal until 1978 when he was nominated as the chair of the Kerala Lalithakala Akademi; he would also chair the academy again in 2001.

Kunhiraman is married to Nalini.

== Legacy ==
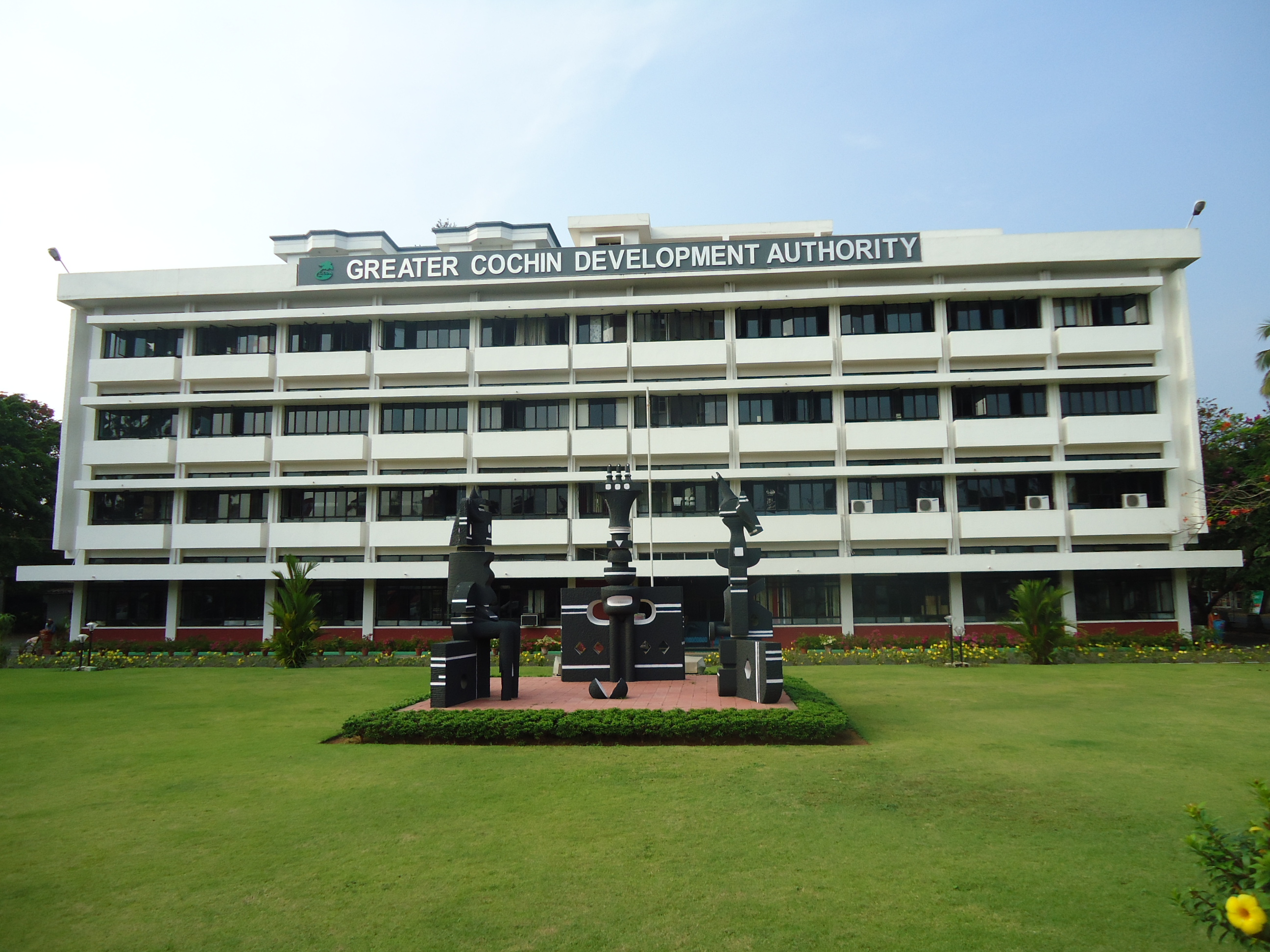
Mukkola Perumal in front of GCDA building

On his return to Kerala from Chennai, Kunhiraman was commissioned by the irrigation department of Kerala, on recommendation from K. C. S. Paniker, for an art work to be installed at the Malampuzha dam garden and he created Yakshi, a 5.5-metre (18 ft) statue of a naked woman, sitting on the lawns; the sensuality of the sculpture drew protests from traditionalists. Two years later, he was invited by the Greater Cochin Development Authority (GCDA) for two sculptures in the premises of their new office in Kadavanthra and he created Environmental Pieces and Mukkola Perumal, both concrete sculptures. He also created a sculpture, Fertility at Ambalamedu premises of the Fertilisers and Chemicals Travancore. In 1990, he completed the Jalakanyaka (Mermaid), a 23-metre (75 ft) sculpture at Shankumugham Beach, in Thiruvananthapuram; The beach also has another of his sculptures titled, Snake.

The bronze bust of K. P. P. Nambiar, the Padma Bhushan winning technocrat, and the bust of K. C. Mammen Mappillai are two conventional sculptures created by Kunhiraman. Amma in Payyambalam, Akshara Shilpam in Kottayam, Conch, Seats, Nandi and Embrace at Veli Tourist Village, are some of his other works. Melathara and Kalithara, dedicated to public with the accompaniment from a violin concert by L. Athira Krishna in Kollam in 2008. and the Aksharashilpam, at the premises of the public library in Kottayam feature among his more recent works. He has also published on poetry anthology, titled, Kānāyi Kuñhirāmant̲e Kavitakaḷ.

== Awards and honours ==
Kunhiraman, who has designed many of the statuettes for various awards in Kerala, was selected by Kerala Lalithakala Akademi for their annual award, Raja Ravi Varma Award, in 2005, making him the first sculptor to receive the honour. He received the Thikkurissy Award in 2006 and Karnataka Chitrakala Parishath awarded him the inaugural MS Nanjunda Rao National Award for Art in 2018. Lalit Kala Akademi, the national academy of India for fine arts, published a book on Kunhiraman's works in 2008. In 2011, he received the T. K. Ramakrishnan Award instituted by Abu Dhabi Sakthi Theatres for his overall contribution. He was conferred the Kerala Sree award instituted by Government of Kerala in 2022.

== Selected works ==
Year	Work	Medium	Venue	Place
1953	Mother and Child	Concrete		Payyambalam, Kannur
1957	Beggar	Plaster of Paris	Government College of Fine Arts	Chennai
1957	Jawaan	Bronze	State Bank of India	Chennai
1958	A figure	Bronze	Victoria and Albert Museum	London
1958	Mother and Father	Concrete	Government College of Fine Arts	Chennai
1958	Portrait of the Painter Rani Poovaiah	Concrete	Government College of Fine Arts	Chennai
1964	Amma (Mother)	Granite	Private Collection	New Delhi
1969	Yakshi	Concrete	Malampuzha dam garden	Malampuzha
1971	Fertility	Concrete	FACT	Ambalamedu
1972	Environmental Pieces	Concrete	GCDA Complex	Kochi
1973	Mukkola Perumal	Concrete	GCDA Complex	Kochi
1975	Horse	Junk sculpture	National Gallery of Modern Art	New Delhi
1976	Relief	Concrete	Mullakkal Temple	Alappuzha
1985	Kengal Hanumanthaiah	Bronze	Vidhana Soudha	Bengaluru
1986	Embrace	Concrete	Veli Tourist Village	Thiruvananthapuram
1986	The Conch	Concrete,	Veli Tourist Village	Thiruvananthapuram
1986	Aattam	Concrete	Veli Tourist Village	Thiruvananthapuram
1990	Relaxation	Concrete	Shankumugham Beach	Thiruvananthapuram
1990	Sagarakanyaka (The Mermaid)	Concrete	Shankumugham Beach	Thiruvananthapuram
1992	Snake	Concrete	Shankumugham Beach	Thiruvananthapuram
1998	Nandi	Concrete	Veli Tourist Village	Thiruvananthapuram
2001	Infinity	Bronze		
2001	Labour's Hand	Bronze		
2001	Seats	Concrete	Payyambalam Beach	Kannur
2001	Thai (Mother)	Concrete	Payyambalam Beach	Kannur
2008	Melathara and Kalithara	Concrete	Sopanam Complex	Kollam
2015	Aksharashilpam	Concrete	Public Library	Kottayam
2018	Reclining figure	Concrete	Mahakavi Kumaranasan Memorial	Thonnakkal
2018	Kumaran Asan	Bronze	Mahakavi Kumaranasan Memorial	Thonnakkal
2018	Vikram Sarabhai	Bronze	Indian Space Research Organisation	Bengaluru

== Books on Kanayai Kunhiraman ==
- Puṣhparāj, Nēmaṃ (2012). Kānāyi Kuñhirāman: Br̥hadākāraṅgaḷuṭe śhilppi. Kerala: State Institute of Languages. ISBN 9788176381284. OCLC 869823336.
- Vijayakumār Mēnōn (2008). Kanayi Kunhiraman. New Delhi: Lalit Kala Akademi. ISBN 9788187507345. OCLC 289070886.

== Gallery ==
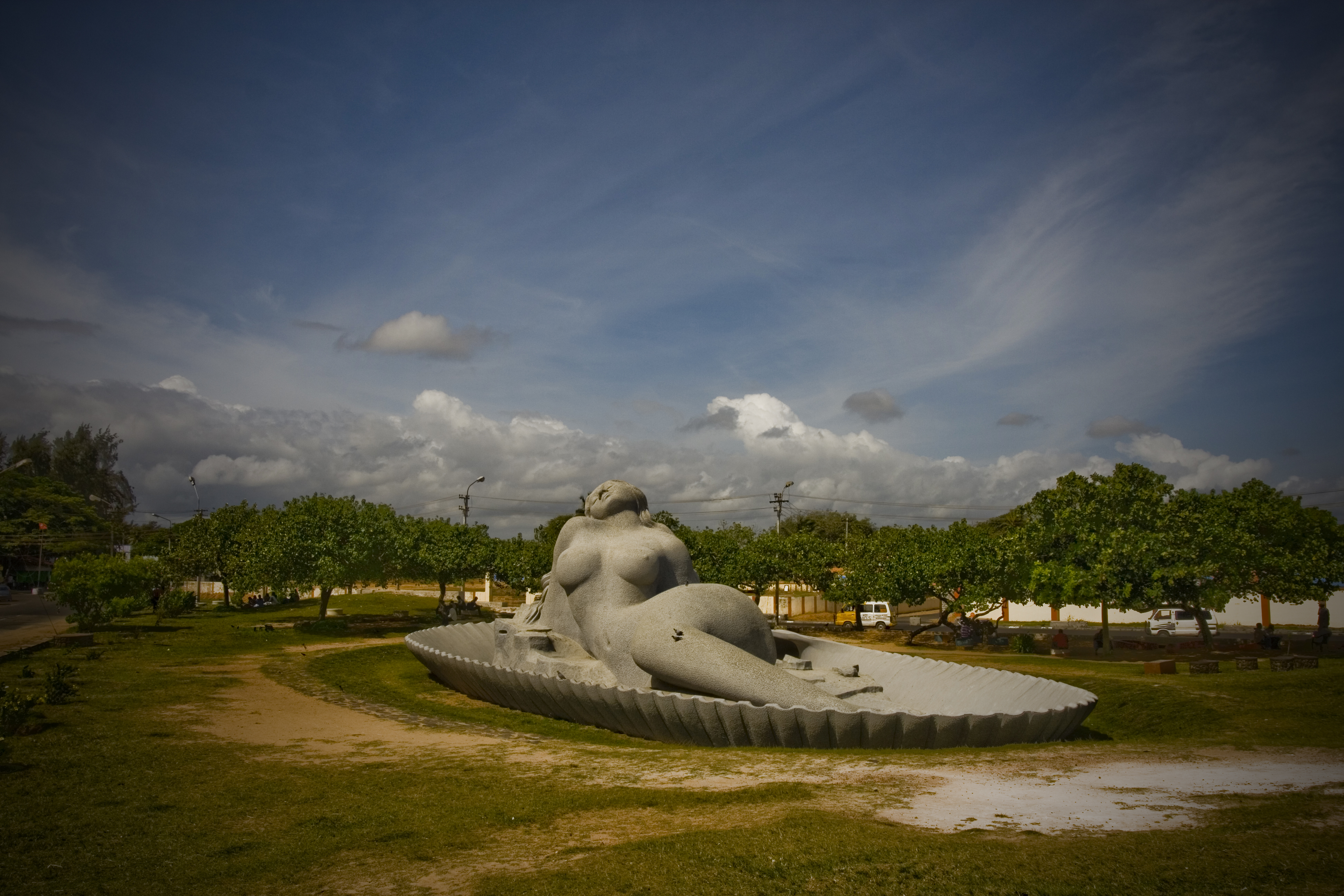
Mermaid (Jalakanyaka) at Shankumugham Beach, Thiruvananthapuram.

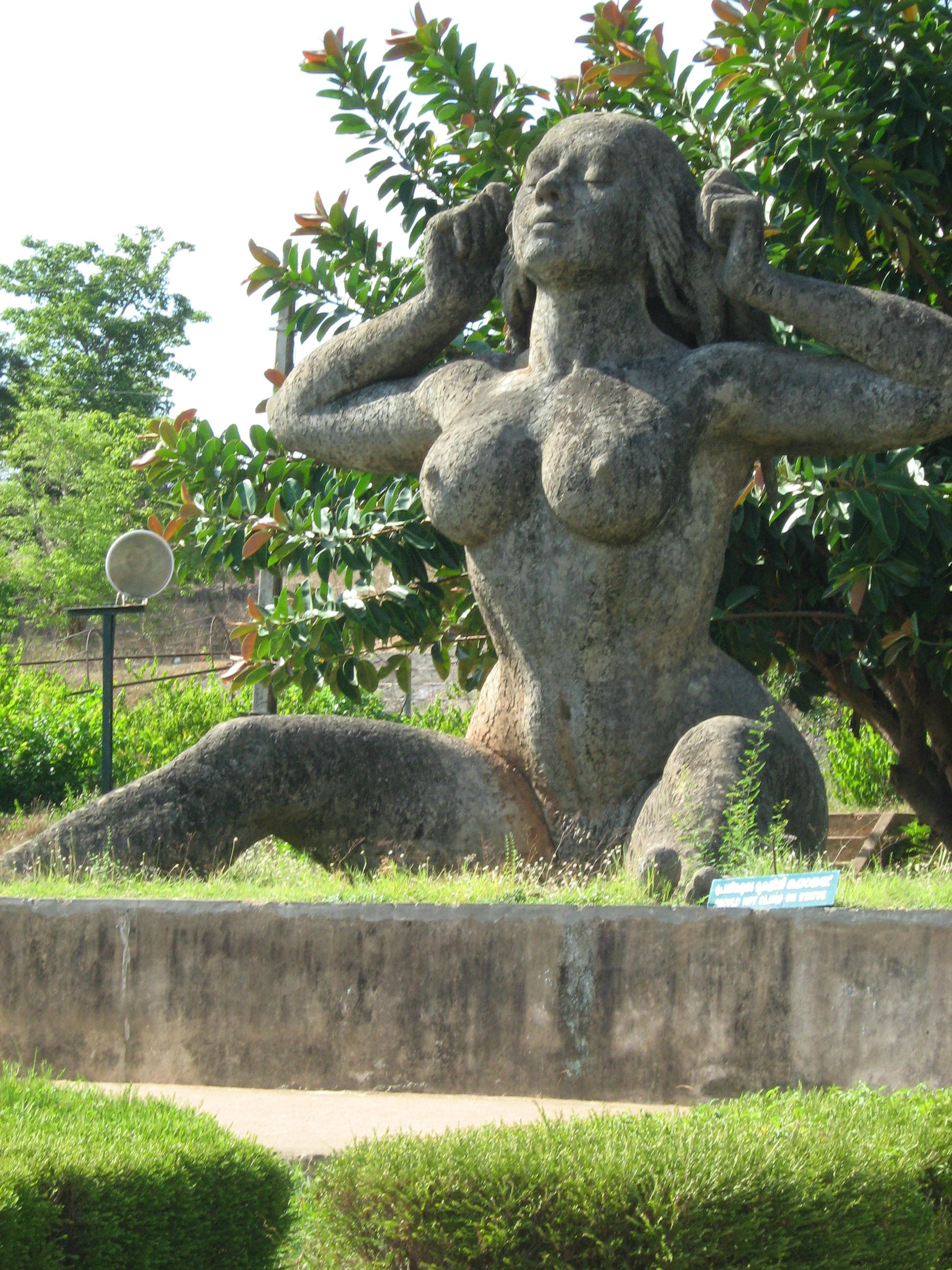
Yakshi at the Malampuzha dam garden

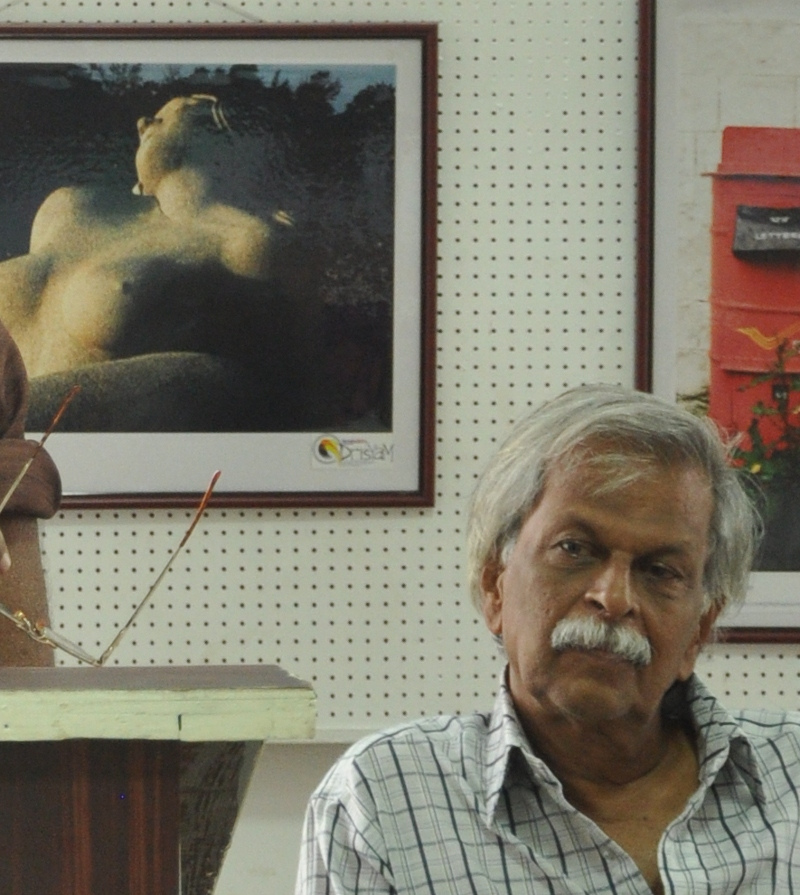
Kanayi with the photo of Jalakanyaka in the backdrop

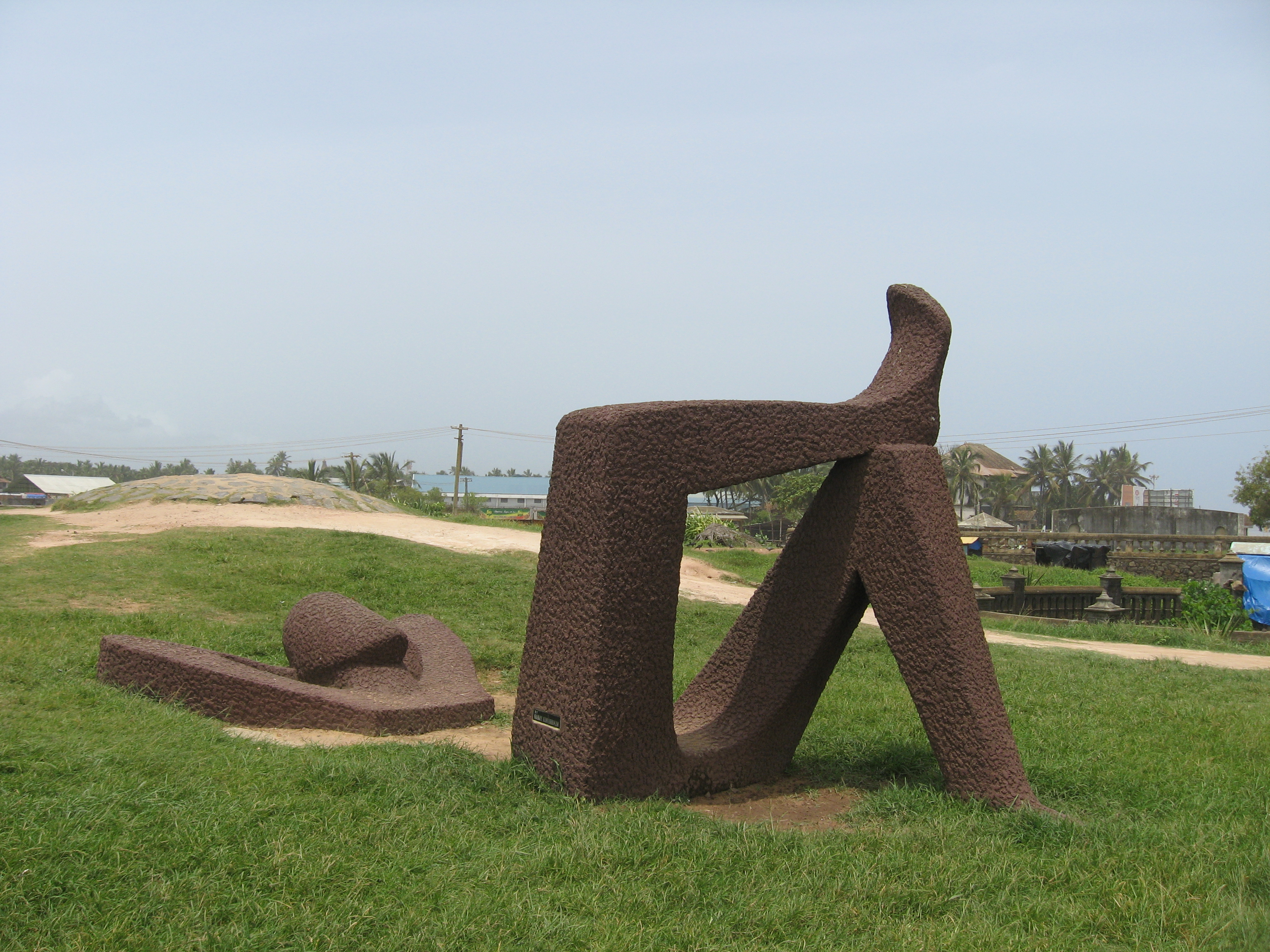
Another sculpture at Shankumugham Beach

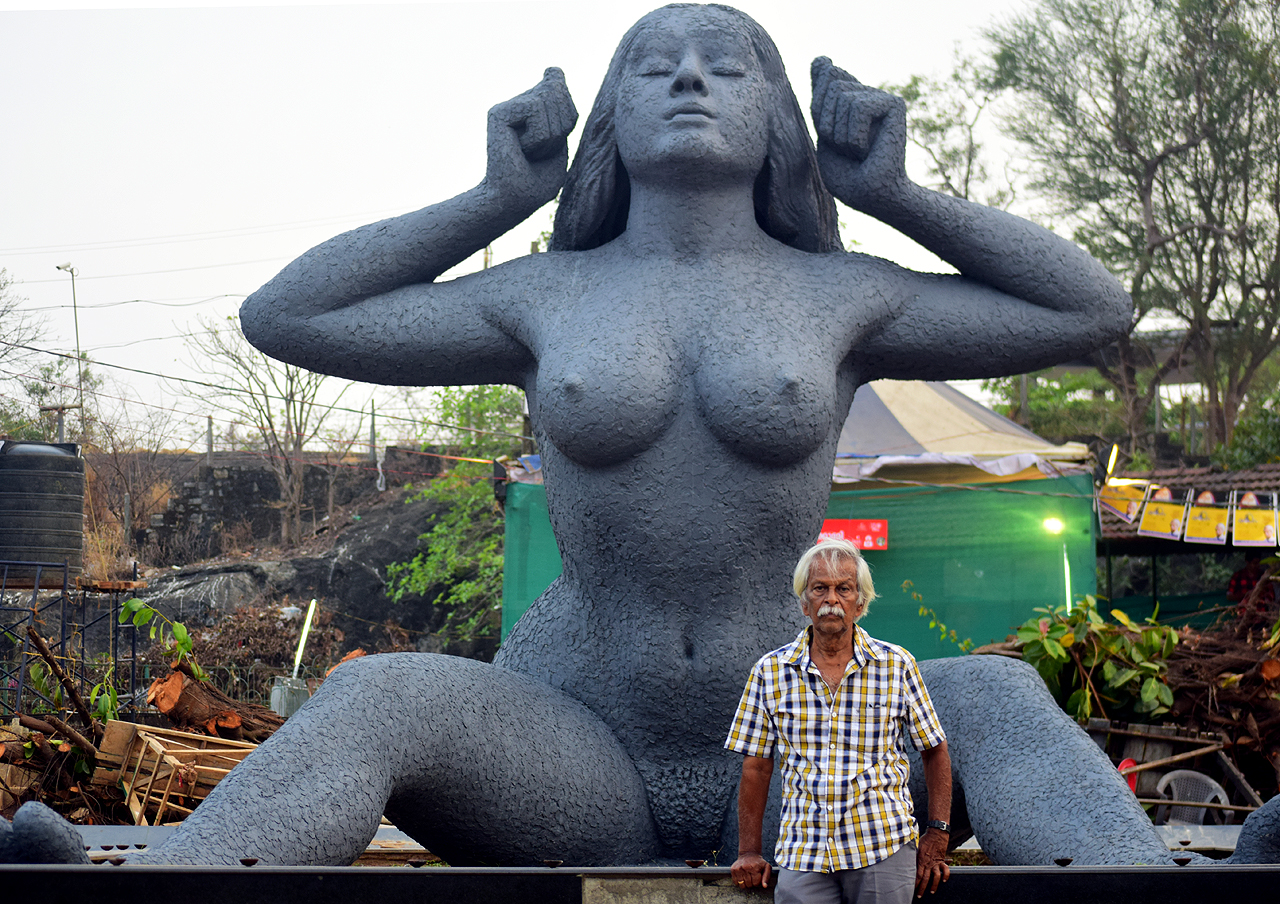
The sculptor and Yakshi

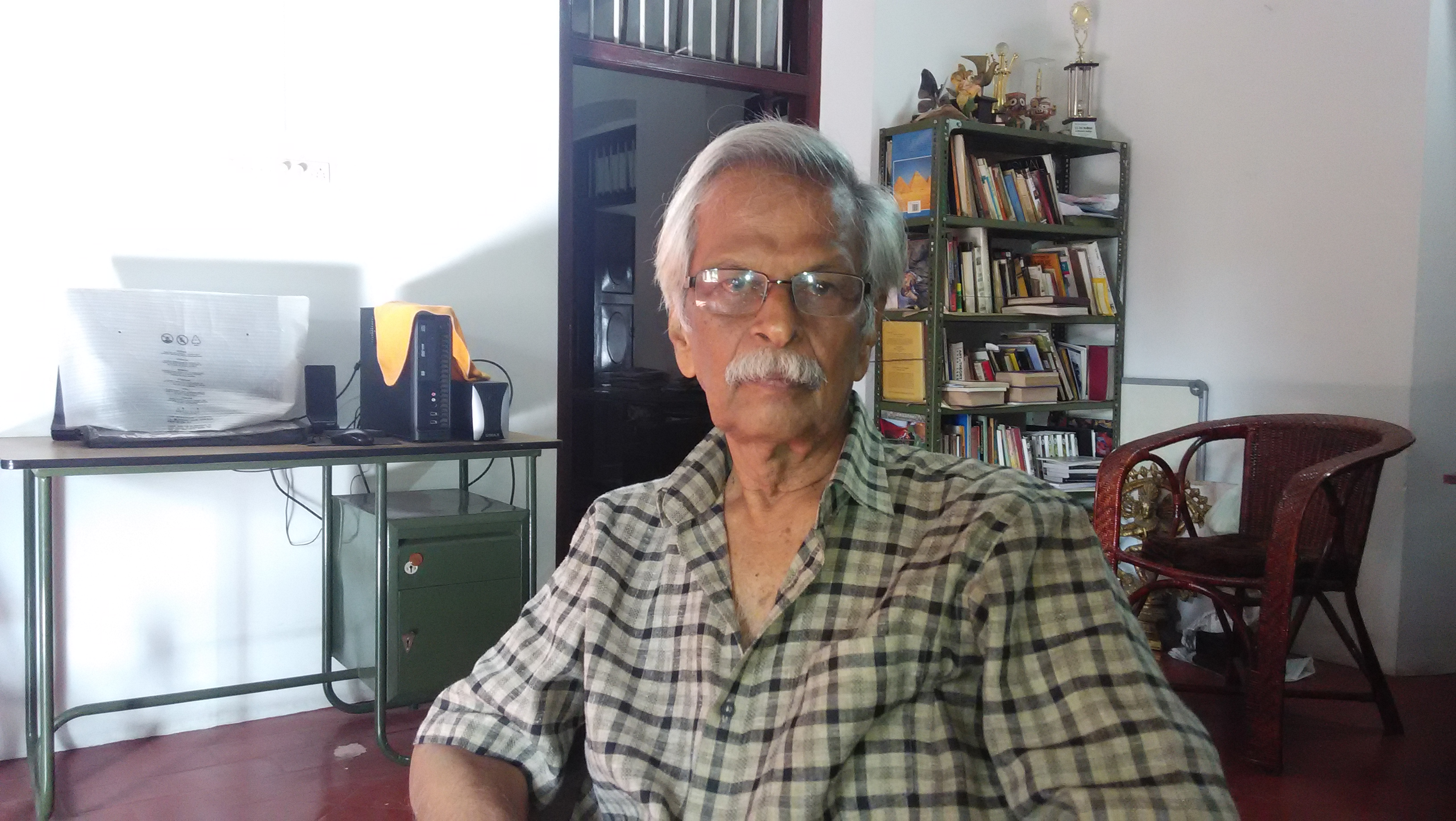
Kanayi Kunhiraman at Thiruvananthapuram

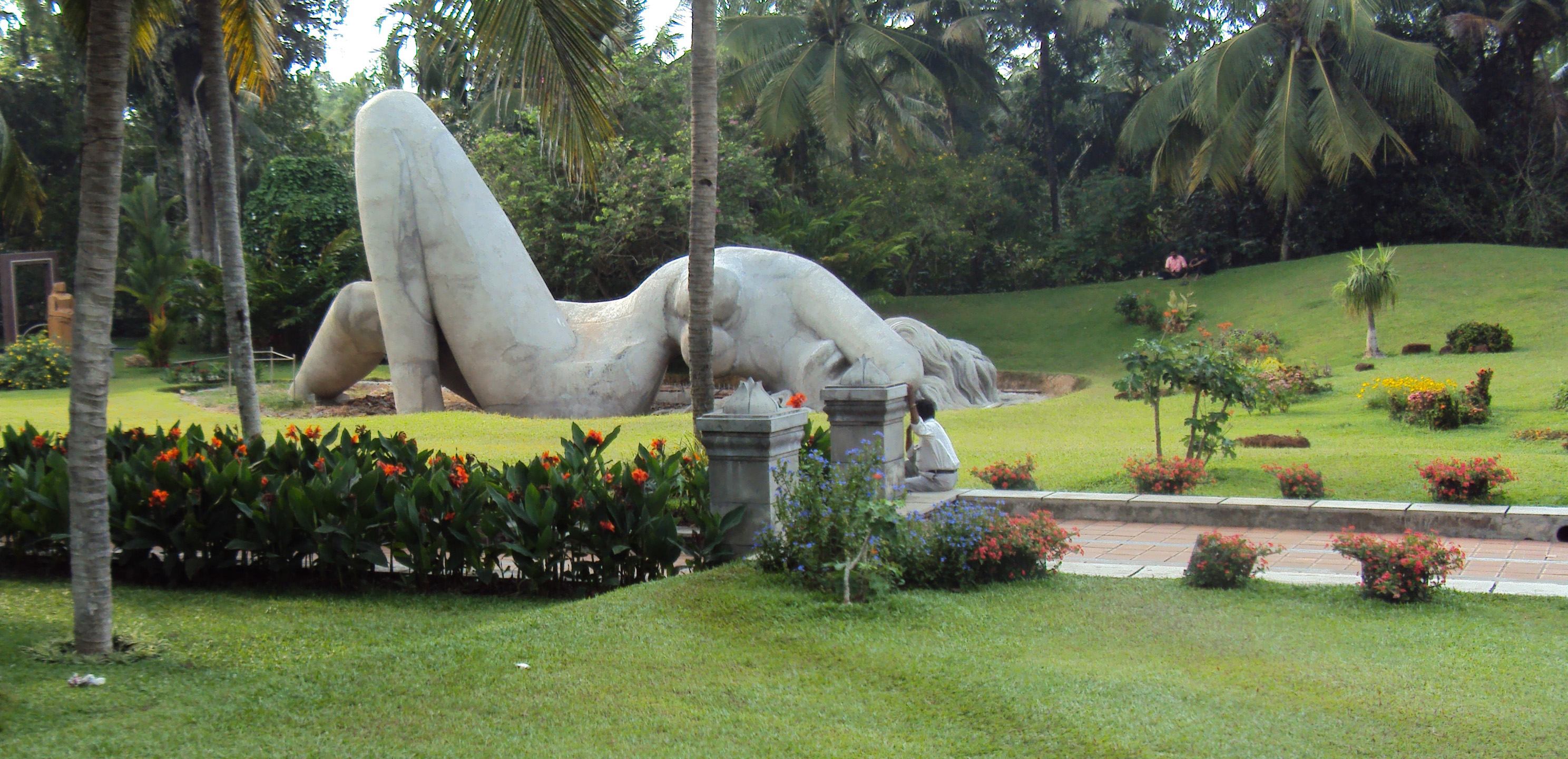
Kumaran Asan Smarakam at Thonnakkal

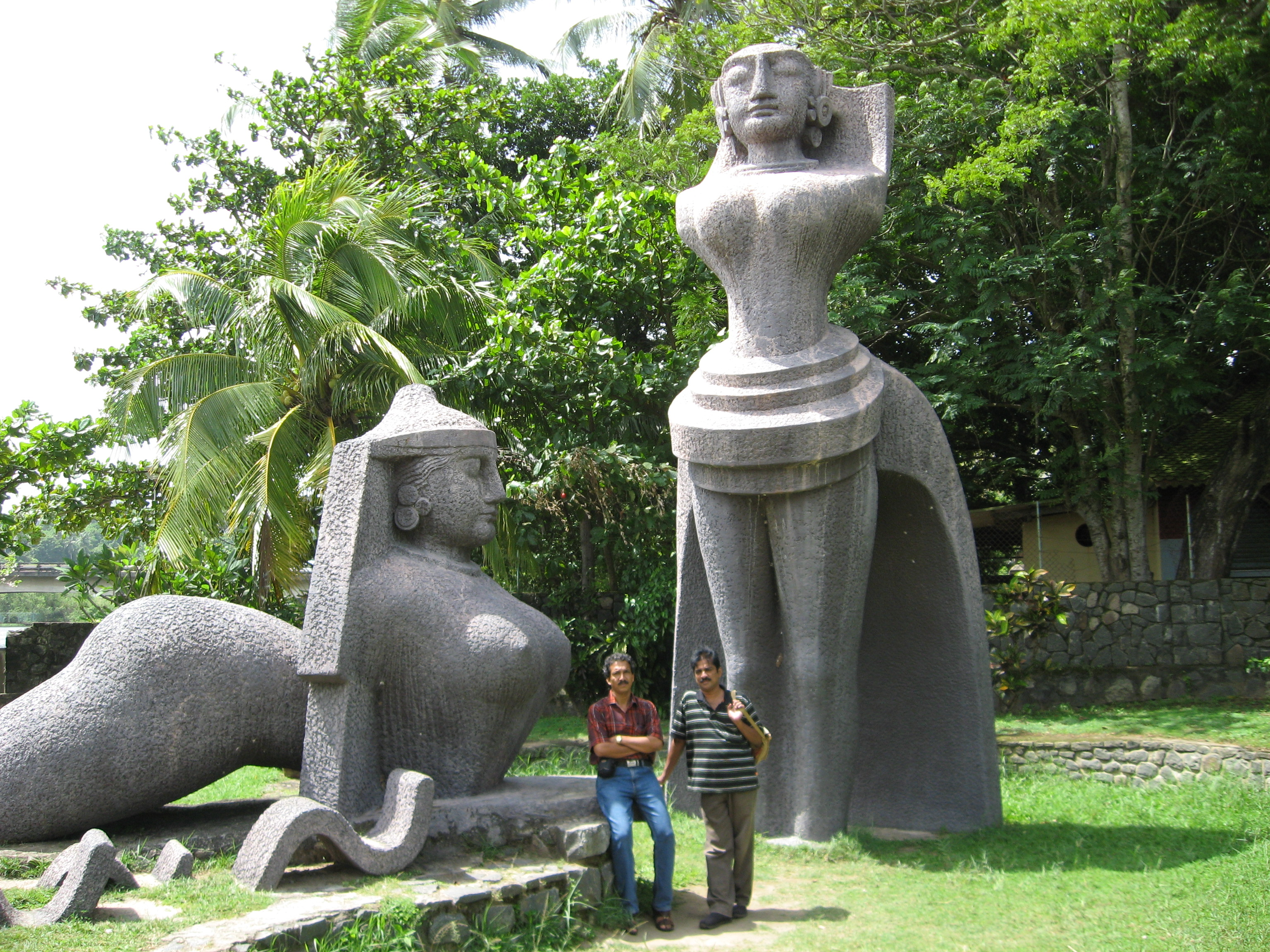
Aattam at Veli Tourist Village

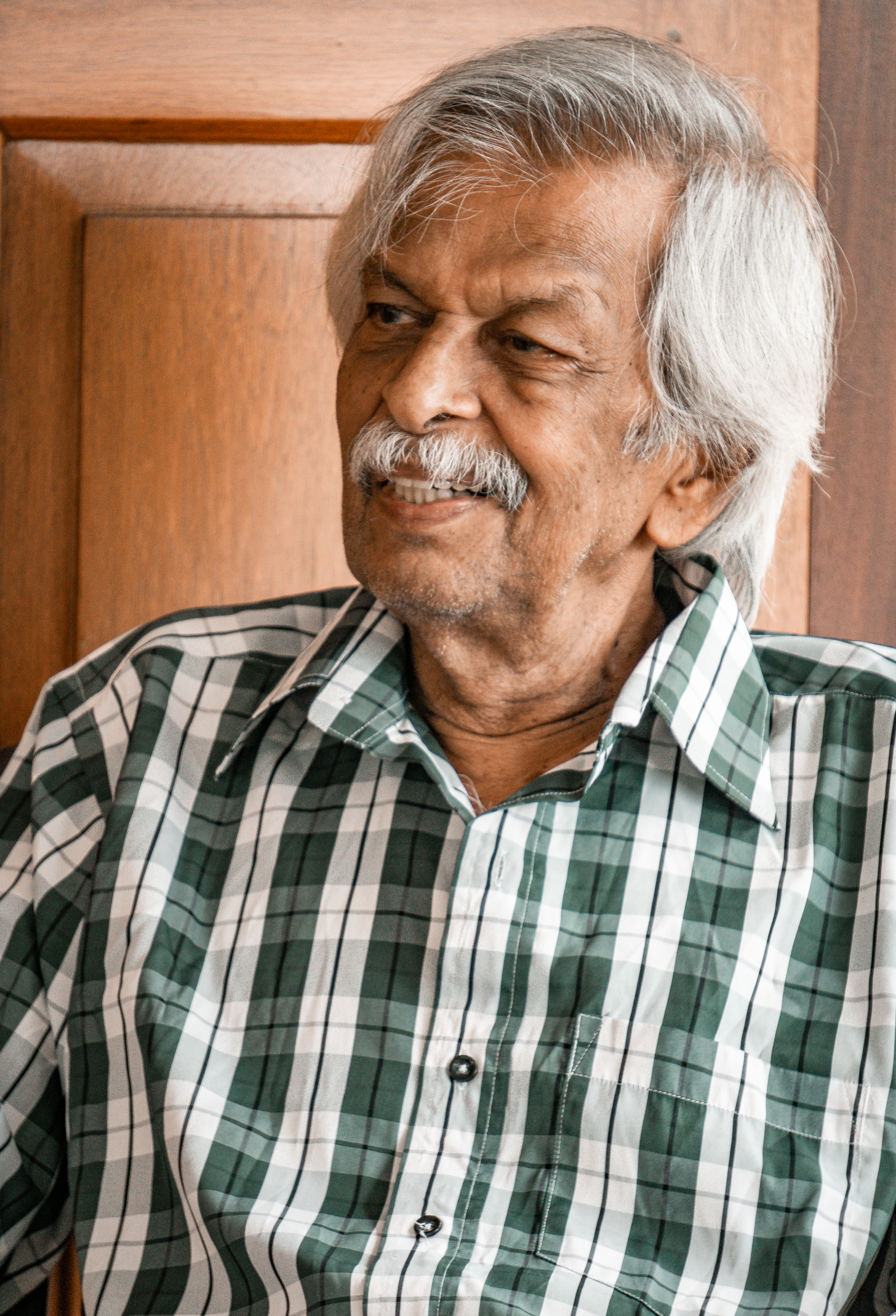
