= Sagarakanyaka =

Largest merperson sculpture in the world

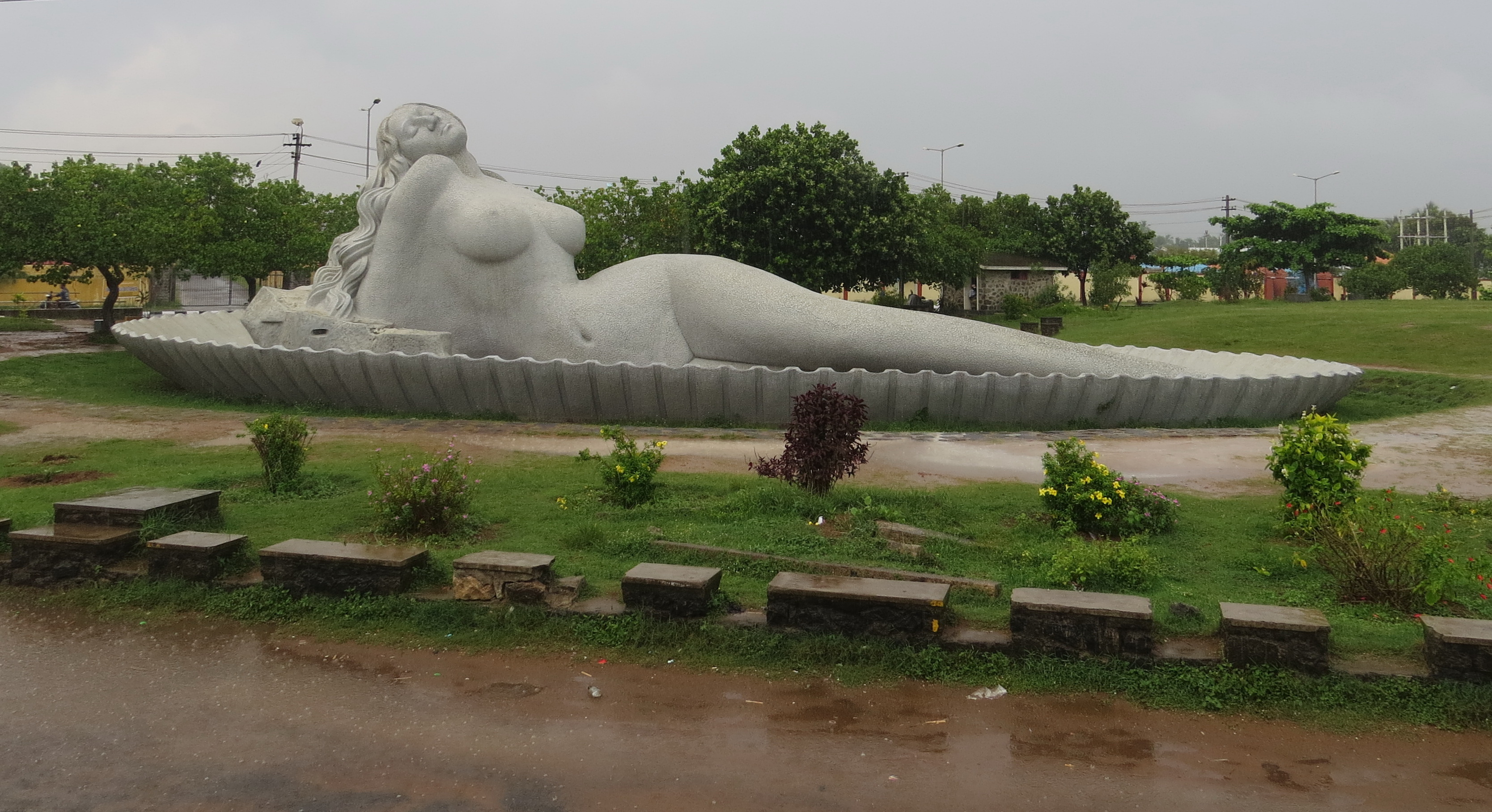
- Artist: Kanayi Kunhiraman
- Year: 1992
- Dimensions: 1,100 cm × 2,700 cm (35 ft × 87 ft)
- Location: Shankumugham Beach, Thiruvananthapuram; 8.4811295°N 76.9123703°E
- Owner: Government of Kerala

Sagarakanyaka is a sculpture of a mermaid situated at the Shankumugham Beach, Kerala. Sculpted by Kanayi Kunhiraman, it is adjudged by the Guinness Book of World Records as the largest merperson sculpture in the world. It has a length of 87 ft and a height of 25 ft. Kunhiraman took two years to complete the sculpture which was finally completed in 1992.

== Overview ==
Kunhiraman completed the sculpture without taking any remuneration. During the construction, the District Collector ordered to stop the construction of the sculpture by saying it was obscene. But K. Karunakaran, who was the Chief Minister at that time intervened and suggested the completion of the sculpture upon the request of Kunhiraman. In October 2022, it was adjudged as the largest merperson sculpture in the world by the Guinness Book of World Records.
