= Mall of Travancore =

Mall of Travancore (MOT)

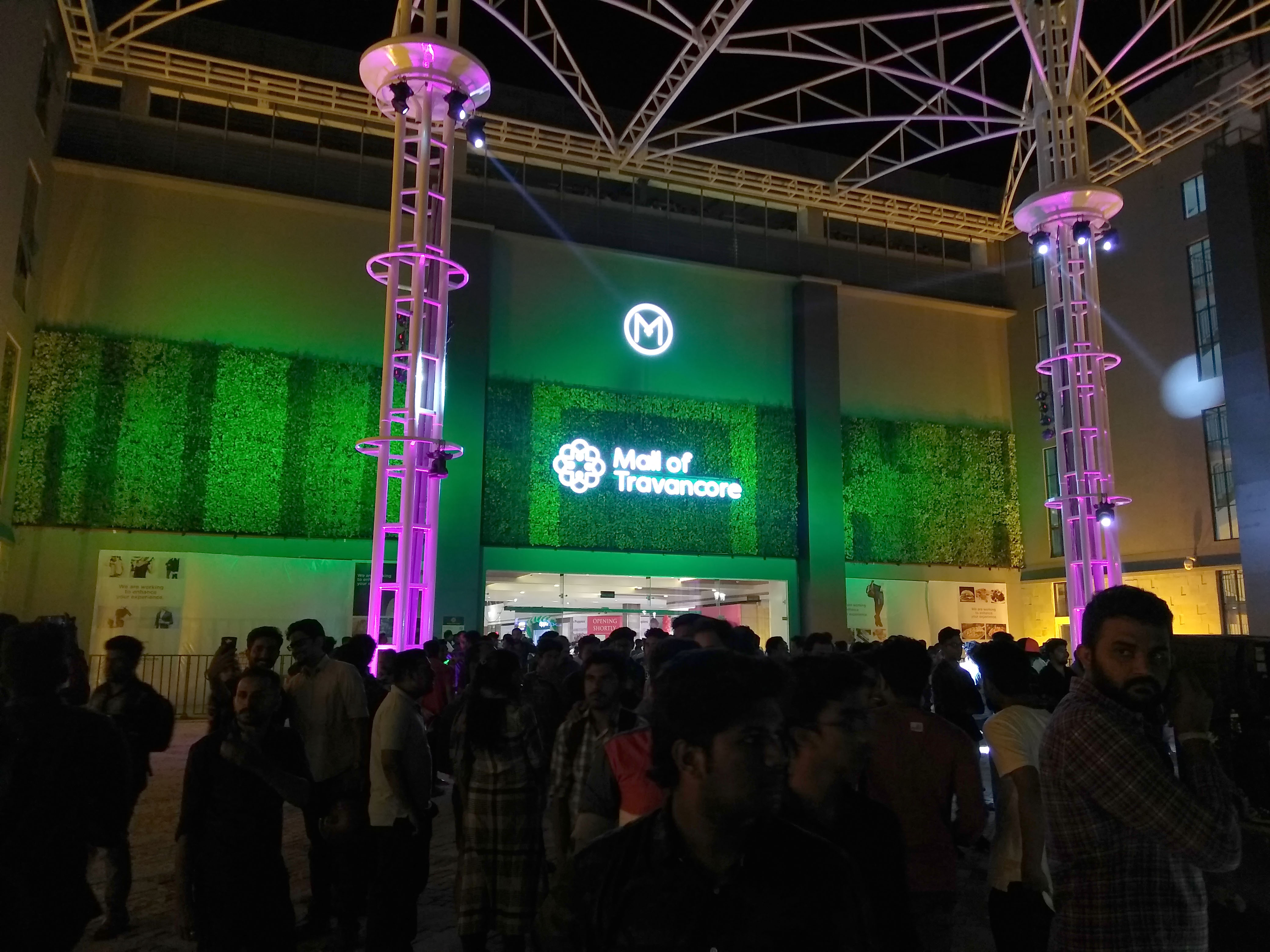
- Main entrance to the mall
- Location: Thiruvananthapuram, India
- Coordinates: 8.4872°N 76.9255°E
- Address: NH 66, Near International Airport, Thiruvananthapuram, Kerala
- Opened: March 23, 2018; 8 years ago
- Developer: Malabar Developers
- Owner: Malabar Group
- Architect: Shijeesh M Das
- Num. of stores: 300+
- Floor area: 700,000 square feet (65,000 m^{2})
- Floors: 4
- Parking: 2500+
- Public transit: KSRTC
- Website: malloftravancore.com

Mall of Travancore (MOT) is a shopping mall located in Thiruvananthapuram, Kerala, India. Developed by Malabar Group, it is the first shopping mall in Thiruvananthapuram. The Mall was initiated by Malabar Developers in 2014 and was completed in 2018. It covers an area of 700,000 square feet (65,000 m^{^{2}}). This is the second largest mall in Thiruvananthapuram after the Lulu Mall. The mall has three floors of retail space, comprising more than 150 retailers.

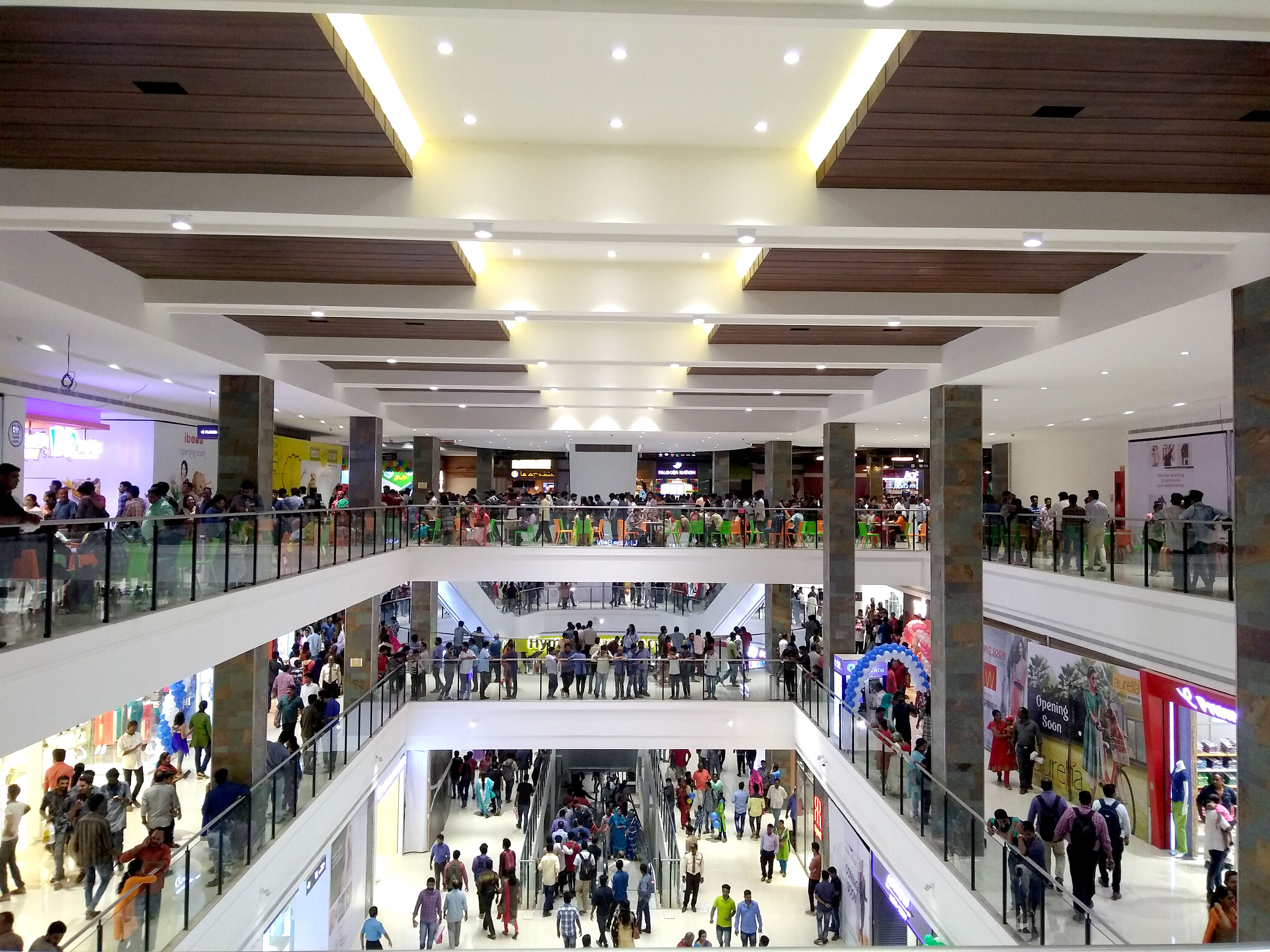
Interior of Mall of Travancore

== Location ==
Situated at NH 66, Eanchakal, Chakkai Junction, right in front of Thiruvananthapuram International Airport, Mall of Travancore is located in Thiruvananthapuram, Kerala, India. The mall is just 650 m away from the airport.

== Facilities and features ==
The mall has an area of 7 lakh sq ft in four floors with the capacity to accommodate 150 stores, A multiplex with 6 screens and a VIP screen by Cinépolis, a hypermarket, jewellery showrooms, electronics and home appliances showroom, showrooms of lifestyle products, a food court and a large entertainment centre with 11 indoor rides, a 9D theatre, 60 video kiosks, a 1.5 km dedicated jogging track and parking facility for around 1,000 cars and 1,200 two-wheelers are some of the amenities at the mall. As of January 2021, The mall contains shops like Azad Star, Ibaco, Muffin House, Chai Chai, Kailash Parbat, Naga's, KFC, McDonald's, Burger King, Taco Bell, Baskin Robbins, Chicking, Noodle King, Fujian Express, Green Apple and many more.

== Green Mall ==
As the first Green Mall in the India, the Mall of Travancore has taken up several measures towards an Eco-friendly environment. The facade of the mall has a vertical garden that covers 70% of the wall. The mall has three organic waste converters each with a total capacity to treat 2.5 tonnes of waste each day. To manage other waste, the mall has a sewage treatment plant with an ability to process over three lakh litres of waste per day. The mall restricts the use of plastic in the premises and the food court uses reusable cutlery.

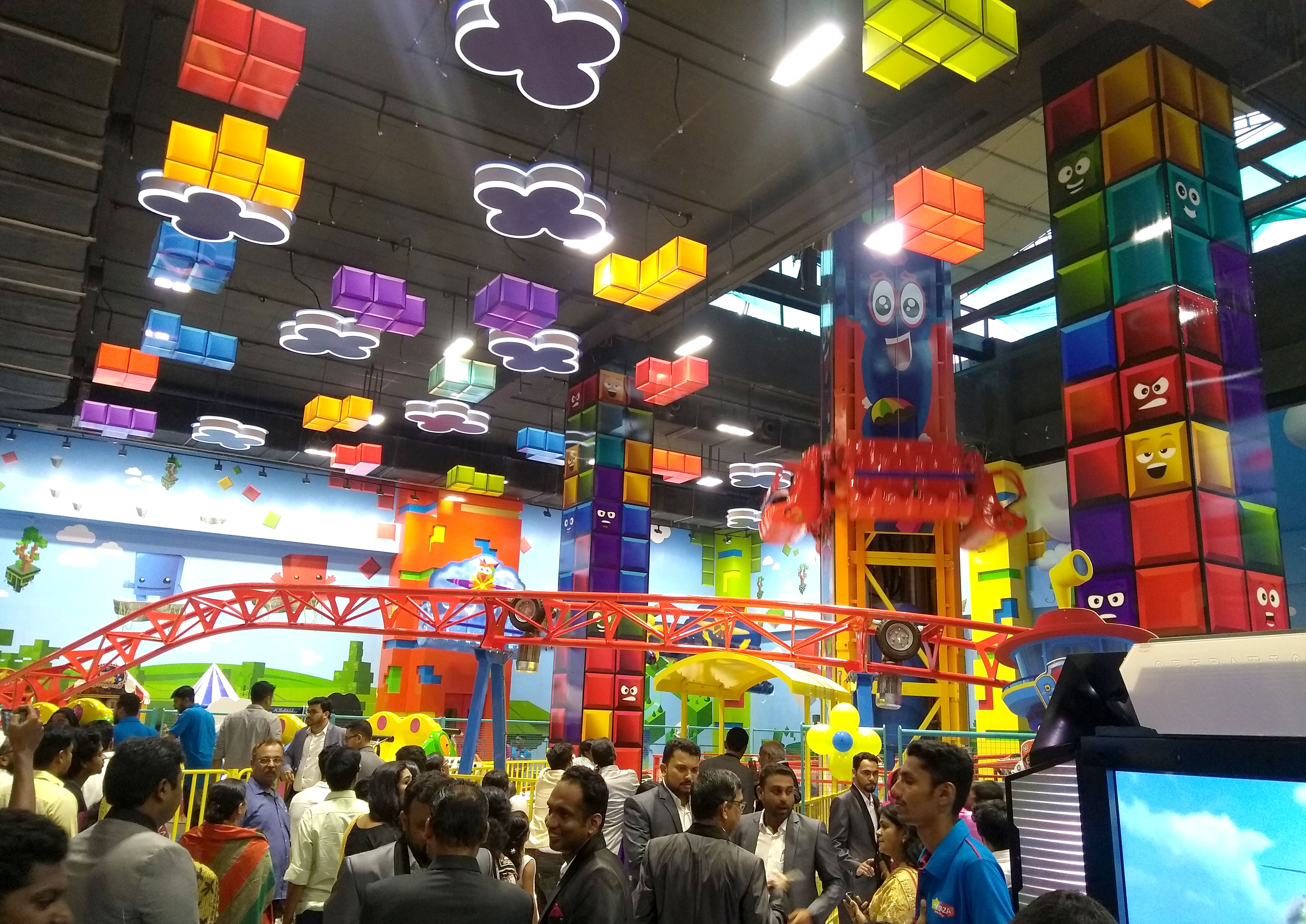
Kids Playing Area

== See also ==
- Taurus Zentrum
- Lulu Mall, Thiruvananthapuram
