= Taurus Zentrum =

Upcoming International Shopping Mall in Trivandrum, Kerala

Taurus Zentrum Mall, Thiruvananthapuram
- Location: Thiruvananthapuram, Kerala, India
- Coordinates: 8°32′57″N 76°52′47″E
- Address: NH 66, Thiruvananthapuram, Kerala, India
- Opened: 2027
- Owner: Taurus Investment Holdings
- Architect: Benoy
- Num. of stores: 300
- Floor area: 1,200,000 square feet (110,000 m^{2}) (Total built up area)
- Floors: 6
- Parking: 2000+
- Public transit: KSRTC
- Website: downtowntvm.com

Taurus Zentrum is an upcoming shopping mall in Thiruvananthapuram, Kerala, India. The mall is owned and managed by Taurus Investment Holdings. Upon completion, it would be one of the largest malls in the country with a total built up area of 1,200,000 square feet (110,000 m^{2}). The Mall is designed by the international architectural firm, Benoy.

The shopping mall is located near National Highway 66 at Technopark Phase III. The mall will have a multiplex with 15 screens by Cinépolis. Also will have both IMAX and 4DX format screens .

== History ==
Taurus Zentrum is part of the Taurus Downtown Trivandrum project by Taurus Investment Holdings at Technopark. The proposal had come up in the Emerging Kerala investors summit held by the Government of Kerala in 2012. The framework agreement was signed in September 2015 and the project started construction in October 2018.

== Description and Features ==
The mall will have Kerala's largest multiplex and first Megaplex with 15 screens by Cinépolis. The mall will also have both IMAX and 4DX screens.

This mall has a digital user experience system and parking spaces for more than 2000 cars.

After completion this will become second largest mall in Thiruvananthapuram after the Lulu Mall.

== See also ==
- Mall of Travancore
- Lulu Mall, Thiruvananthapuram
