= Lulu Mall, Thiruvananthapuram =

Shopping mall in Kerala, India

LuLu Mall Thiruvananthapuram

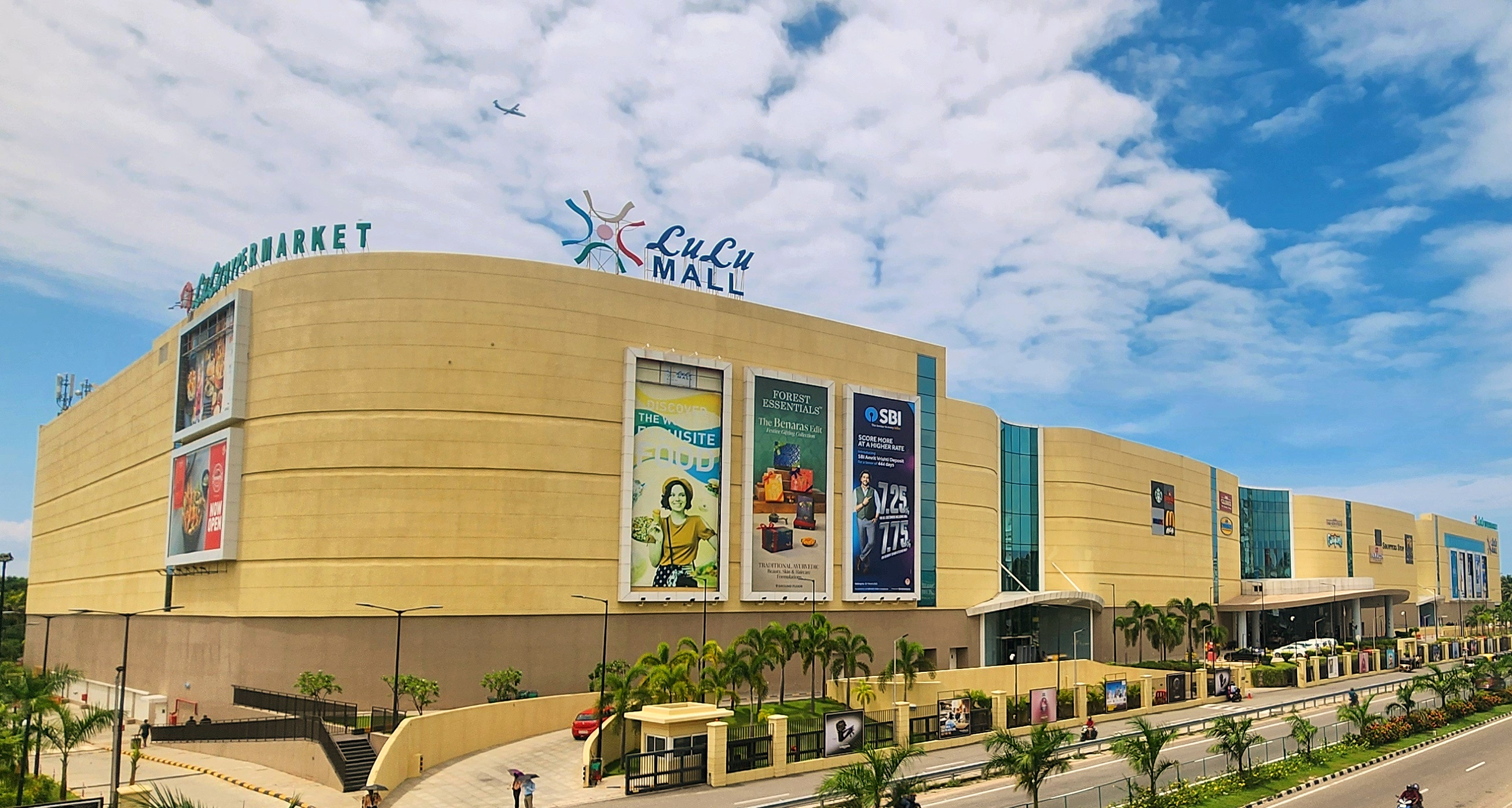
- Lulu International Shopping Mall
- Location: Aakkulam, Thiruvananthapuram, Kerala, India
- Coordinates: 8°30′55″N 76°53′55″E
- Address: NH 66
- Opened: 17 December 2021
- Developer: Sobha Pvt. Limited
- Owner: LuLu Group International
- Architect: Design International
- Num. of stores: 300+
- Num. of anchor tenants: 12
- Floor area: 2,200,003 sq ft (204,387.0 m^{2})
- Floors: LG+G+2
- Parking: 3800+
- Public transit: Thiruvananthapuram North railway station, 2 km (1.2 mi), Central bus station Thiruvananthapuram, 8 km (5.0 mi)
- Website: www.thiruvananthapuram.lulumall.in

Lulu Mall Thiruvananthapuram is a shopping mall located in Thiruvananthapuram, the capital city of Kerala, India. With a total built up area of 22,00,003 sq.ft, it is the biggest mall in Kerala and one of the largest malls in India.

The shopping mall is located along the side of National Highway 66 at Aakkulam near Technopark the biggest IT park in Kerala. The mall has around 300 national and international brands and 12 anchor stores including a Lulu Hypermarket, largest indoor entertainment zone in the country, a multilevel car parking space for more than 3,800 cars. It also has the largest food court in India with a capacity for 2500 people serving various regional, international cuisines. The mall houses Kerala's only PVR Superplex having 12 screens and the state's first IMAX screen by PVR cinemas. The property is owned and managed by M.A. Yusuff Ali, the chairman and managing director of LuLu Group International.

== History ==
Initially LuLu Group International planned to construct a relatively smaller mall in Pattom, Thiruvananthapuram with an investment of ₹500 crore (US$52 million). But later they bought a 46 acres land in Aakkulam along the highway and made the decision to build a bigger mall with a projected budget of ₹2,000 crore (US$210 million). The construction was started in August 2016 but the works were interrupted several times due to the COVID-19 pandemic restrictions put up by both the State and Central Governments which cost an additional ₹ 220 crores for the project. It was inaugurated by Sri. Pinarayi Vijayan, the honourable Chief Minister of Kerala in the presence of H.E. Dr. Thani bin Ahmed Al Zeyoudi, the honourable Minister for Foreign Trade United Arab Emirates on 16 December 2021 and opened to the public on 17 December 2021.

== Description and features ==
The shopping mall is located along the side of National Highway 66 at Aakkulam. The mall has a parking space for up to 3,800 cars with traffic management systems like ANPR. The mall has a food court with a capacity for 2,500 people and a 12 screen multiplex which include 4DX screen and IMAX also by PVR Cinemas.

== Transport ==
- Thiruvananthapuram North Railway Station, 2 km (1.2 mi)
- Thiruvananthapuram Central City Railway Station, 8 km (5.0 mi)
- Thiruvanathapuram Central Bus Station, 8 km (5.0 mi)
- Thiruvananthapuram International Airport, 5 km (3.1 mi)
- Thiruvanathapuram - Vizhijam International Seaport, 20 km (12 mi)

== See also ==
- Mall of Travancore
- Taurus Zentrum
