= Yakshi (sculpture) =

Sculpture in Kerala, India

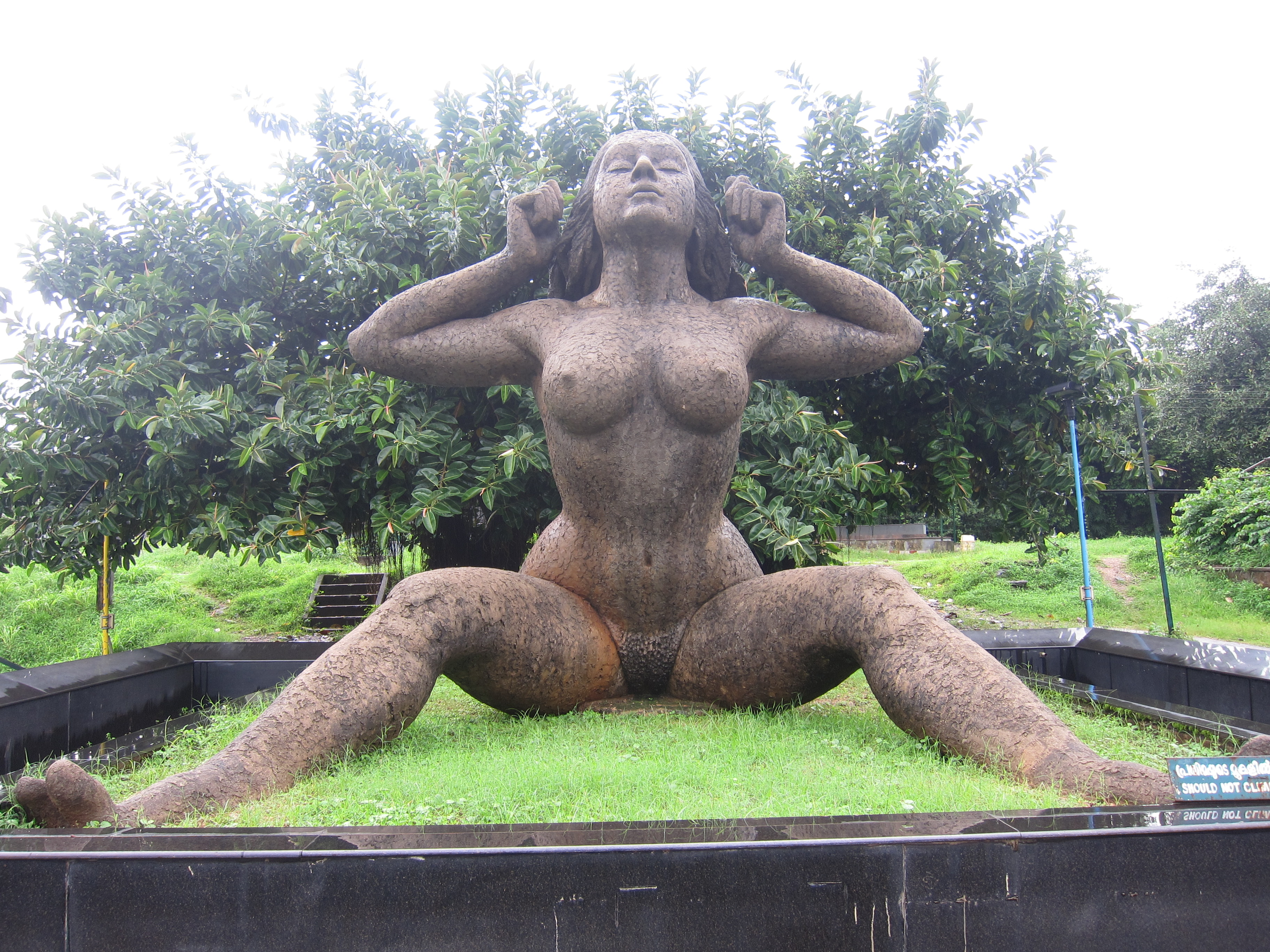
- Artist: Kanayi Kunhiraman
- Year: 1969
- Dimensions: 910 cm (30 ft)
- Location: Malampuzha, Palakkad
- Owner: Government of Kerala

Yakshi is a sculpture in Malampuzha park, Palakkad adjacent to the Malampuzha Dam in the Indian state of Kerala. Sculptored by Kanayi Kunhiraman, its construction was completed in 1969. It is a 30 ft (9.1 m) tall sculpture of a voluptuous, nude female yakshi in a relaxed sitting posture with legs stretched forward and spread, lifted breasts, fingers running through her unlocked hair, and half-opened eyes gazing skyward in a semi-drowsy, sensuous expression. The sculpture is constructed in a single piece. Kunhiraman was honoured by Kerala Government in 2019 during the 50th anniversary of the sculpture.

== Criticism ==
The sculpture have been criticised by some people for its nudity.
