= Malampuzha =

Town in Kerala, India

Malampuzha-I
- Village
- Location in Kerala, India Malampuzha-I (India)
- Coordinates: 10°49′N 76°39′E
- Country: India
- State: Kerala
- District: Palakkad

Government
  - Body: Malampuzha Grama Panchayat

Area
  - Total: 174.58 km^{2} (67.41 sq mi)

Population (2011)
  - Total: 11,879
  - Density: 68.043/km^{2} (176.23/sq mi)

Languages
  - Official: Malayalam, English
- Time zone: UTC+5:30 (IST)
- PIN: 678005,678651
- Telephone code: 0491
- Vehicle registration: KL-09
- Parliament constituency: Palakkad
- Assembly constituency: Malampuzha

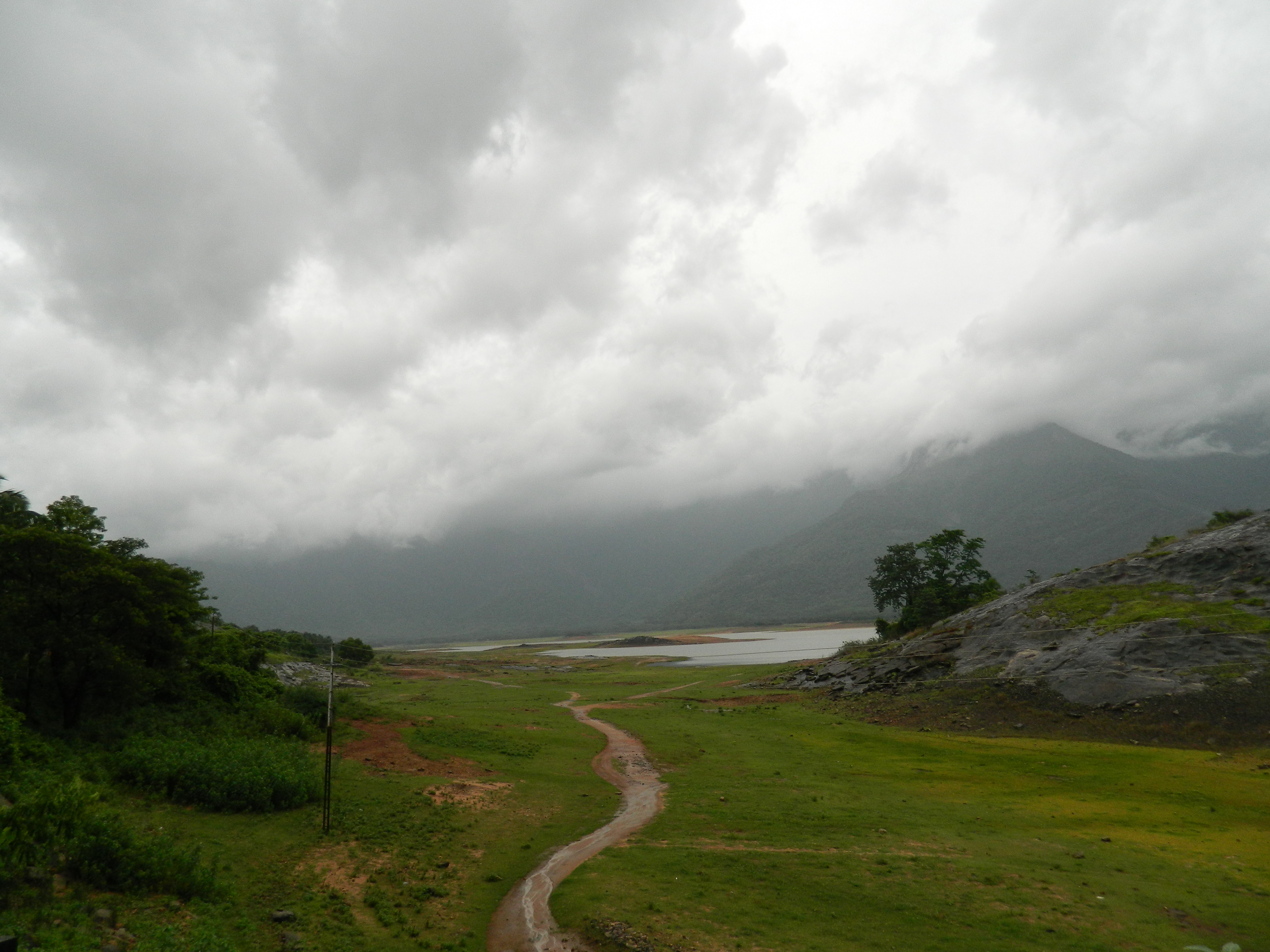

Malampuzha is a town in the Palakkad district of Kerala, India. It is located about 3.5 km (2.2 mi) from Malampuzha Dam and 14 km (8.7 mi) from Palakkad city.

== Transport ==
- Nearest railway station: Palakkad Junction - 15 km
- Nearest airport: Coimbatore International Airport - 55 km

== Malampuzha Dam and Gardens ==
Malampuzha Dam and Gardens are located 8 km from Palakkad town. It was built in 1955 and the garden was renovated in 2012. The main attractions are the suspension bridge, the cable car ride and the fantasy park. There are several gardens, including one Japanese garden. The Yakshi statue of Kanayi Kunjiraman is also reputed even though the nudity of the structure is not approved by the conservative society of Kerala. The dam is accessible by bus and the last bus returns to town by 8.00 pm. The nearest railway station is Palakkad Junction which is otherwise known as Olavakkode.

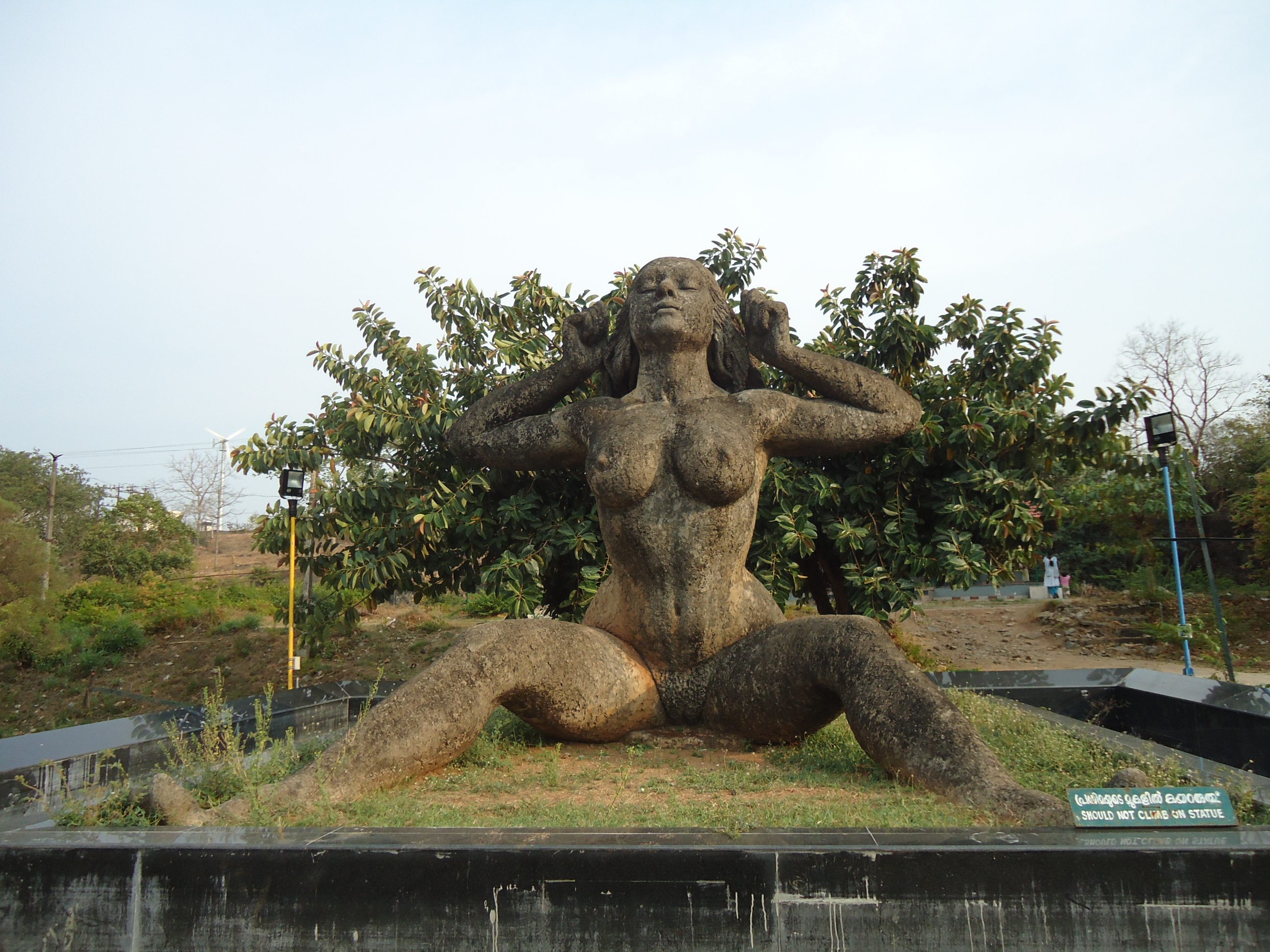
Yakshi Statue

== Important Landmarks ==
- Sai Nursing Hospital
- Akathethara Railway Gate
- Shabri Ashram
- NSS College of Engineering
- Christian Brethren Church
- Govt ITI Malampuzha
- SI-MET Nursing College
- Ashram Tribal School
- Madurai Veeran Temple
- National Fish Seed Farm
- Malampuzha Dam and Gardens

== Suburbs and Villages ==
- Alamkode (7C), Neelikkad, Rail Nagar, Andi Madam and Sneha Nagar
- Nadakkavu, Kallekkulangara, Devi Nagar and Chithra Junction
- Shiva Nagar, Shastha Nagar, Manthakkad and NPM Nagar
- Kripa Sadan Nagar and Shri Krishna Nagar

== Politics ==
Malampuzha assembly constituency is part of Palakkad Lok Sabha constituency.

== Gallery ==
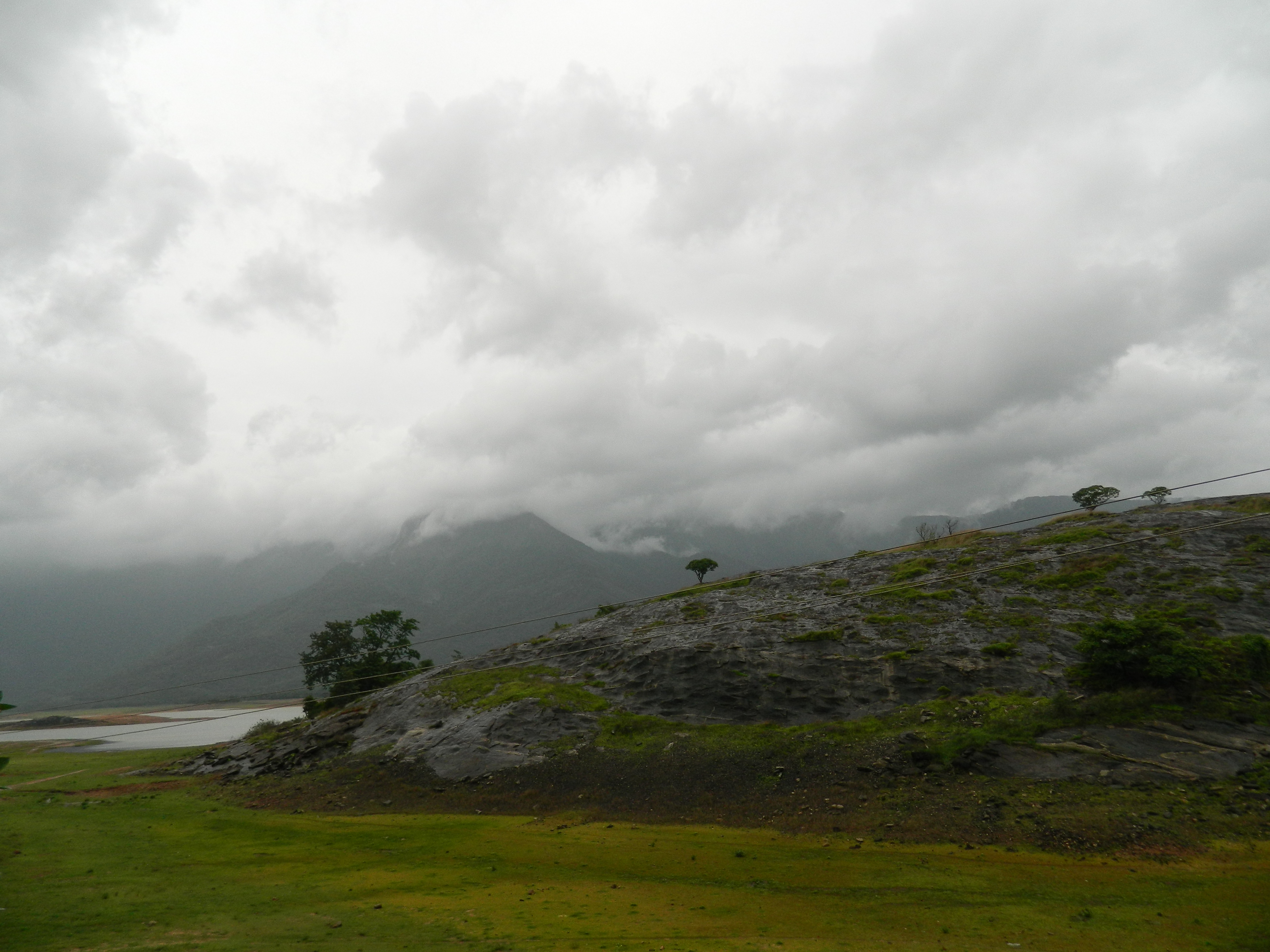

== Education ==
- Government ITI, Malampuzha
- Jawahar Navodaya Vidyalaya, Palakkad

== See also ==
- Malampuzha River
- Palakkad
- Kanayi Kunhiraman - sculptor
- Malampuzha Dam
