= Tourism in Thiruvananthapuram =

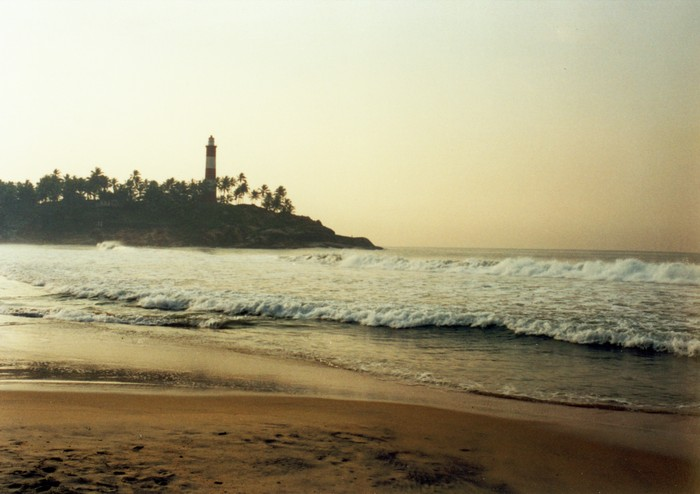
Kovalam beach, Thiruvananthapuram

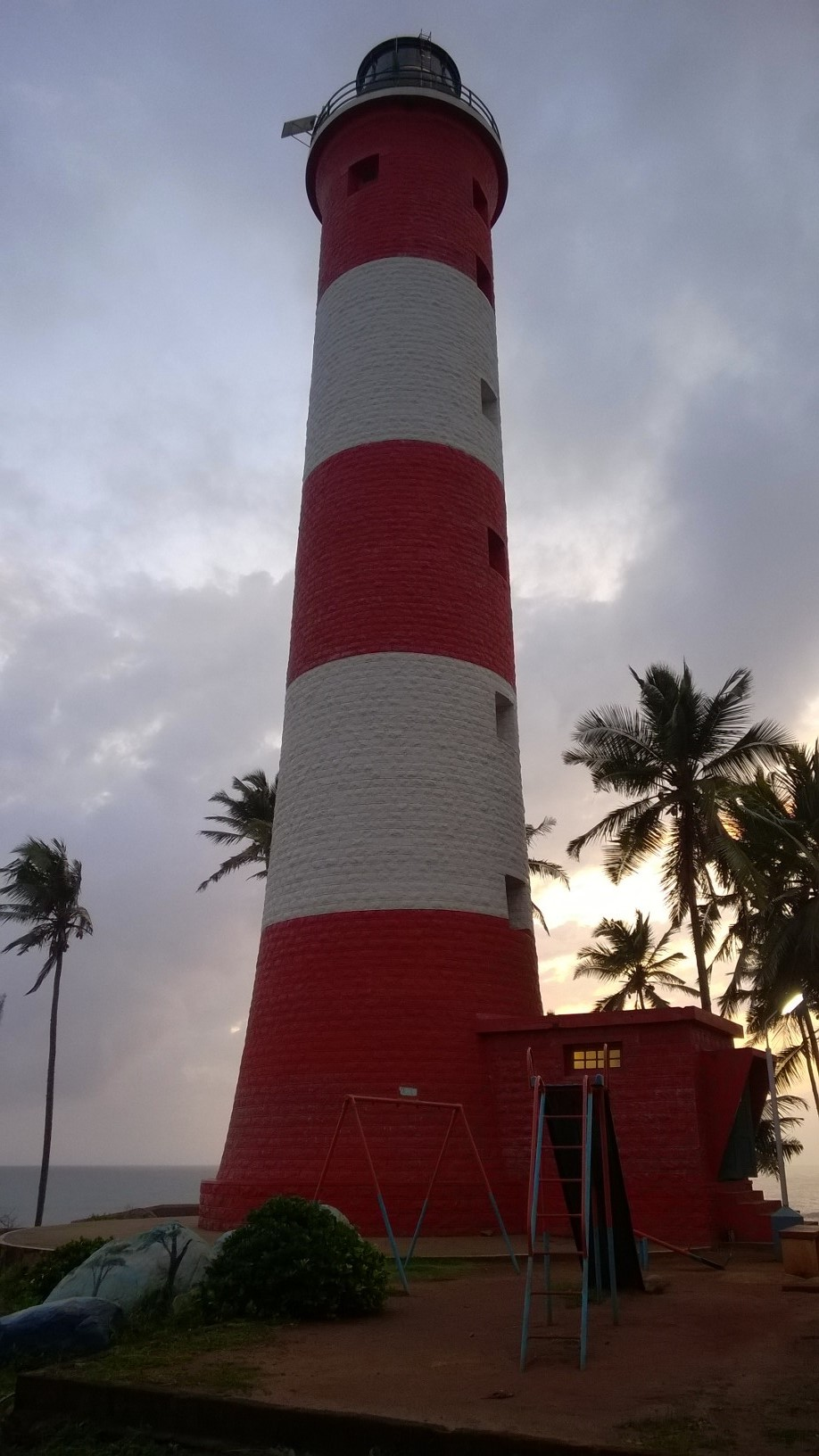
Close view of the lighthouse in Vizhinjam, Thiruvananthapuram

Tourism in Thiruvananthapuram district in the Indian state of Kerala promotes the area's hill stations, backwaters, beaches, lagoons, and wildlife sanctuaries. The area is a tourism destination and receives chartered flights for medical tourism, as there are more than a hundred recognised Ayurveda centres in and around the city. This is primarily due to Ayurveda's popularity in foreign countries. Medical tourism is further promoted by modern medicine hospitals in the city. Recuperation facilities are available at five-star beach resorts and hill stations nearby.

== Agastyakoodam ==
Situated on the eastern side of the district at about 1,869 metres (6,132 ft) above sea level, Agasthyarkoodam is one of the highest peaks in the Western Ghats and is the second highest peak in Kerala after Anamudi which is the highest peak in the Western Ghats. Tradition says that the great sage Agasthya lived on this peak. Noted for its abundant ayurvedic herbs, the cone-shaped mountain is a centre of pilgrimage for Hindus because of Agastya, who was a confirmed bachelor. Hence, the aborigines dislike the presence of women on the hill and they are forbidden from ascending the peak.. Agasthyavanam Biological Park offers trekking opportunities.

== Vizhinjam ==
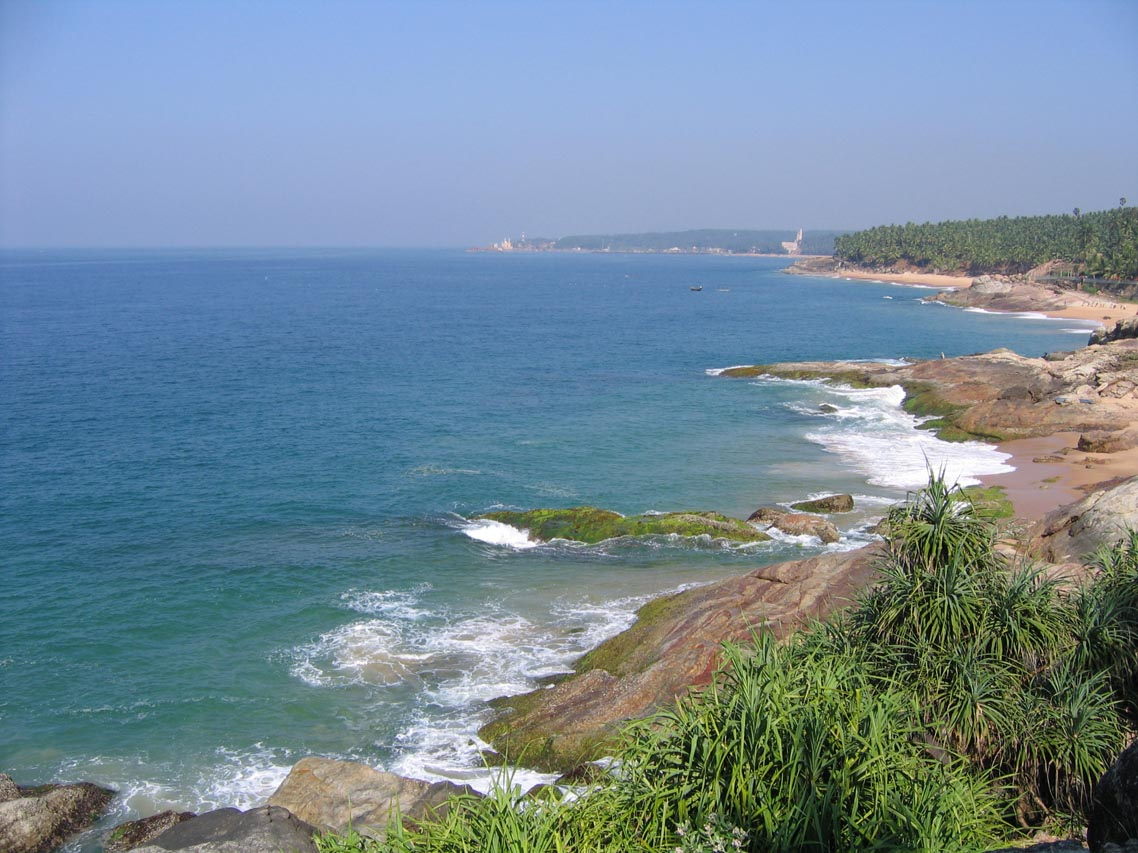
Vizhinjam Port site

About two km south of Kovalam, Vizhinjam is believed to have been an ancient port. Now, Vizhinjam is a fishing harbour, with a light house. The Portuguese and the Dutch had commercial establishments here. The Portuguese have built a church in Vizhinjam near to the sea shore, which is still functional and is referred as the Old Vizhinjam Church. It is located in the vizhinjam fishing harbour area. This place is being developed into an international deep water container transshipment terminal because of its proximity to international shipping lanes and its natural depth.
