= Tambaram – Thiruvananthapuram Central Amrit Bharat Express =

Amrit Bharat Express train route in India

Tambaram–Thiruvananthapuram Central Amrit Bharat Express
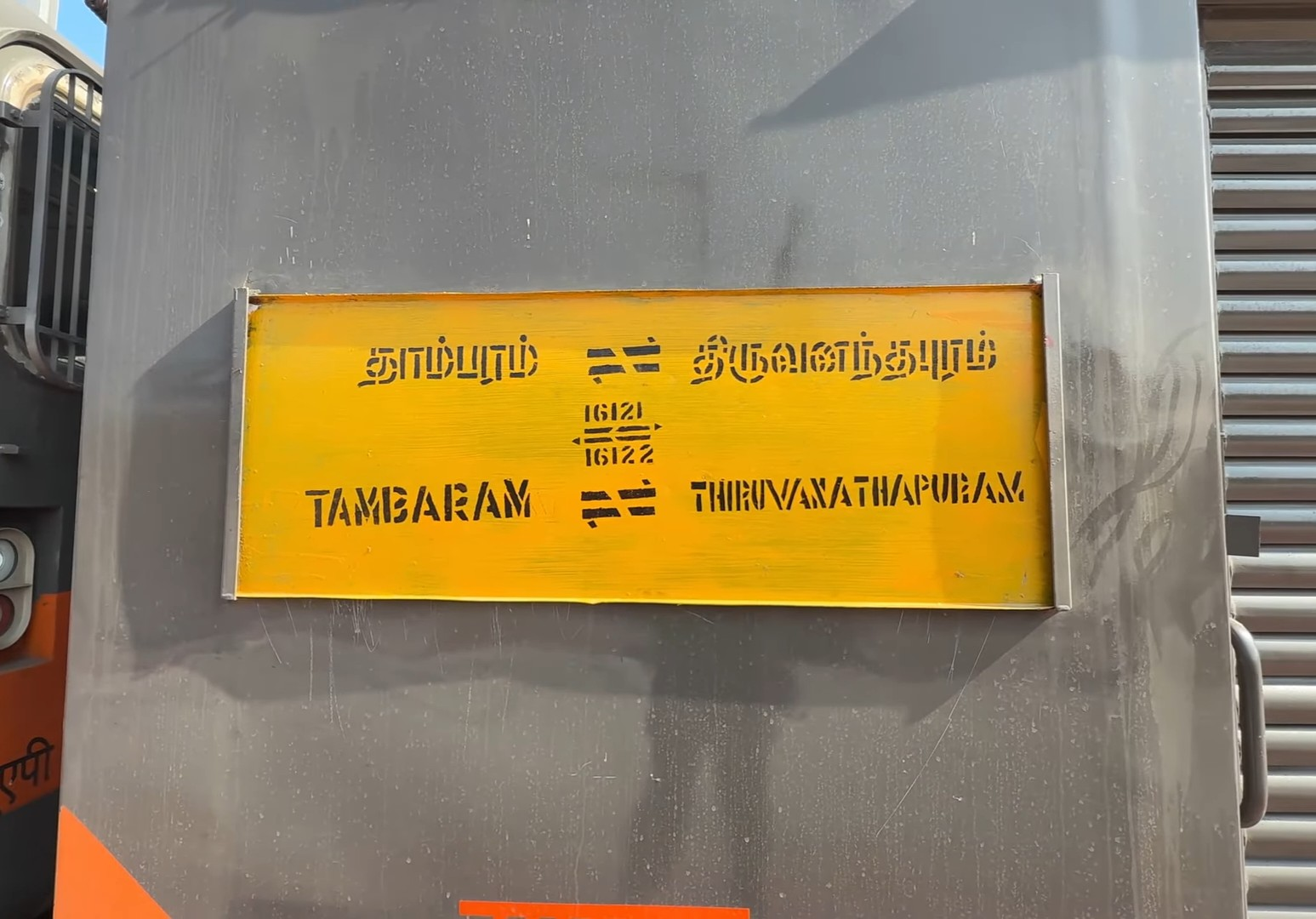

Overview
- Service type: Amrit Bharat Express, Superfast
- Status: Active
- Locale: Tamil Nadu and Kerala
- First service: 23 January 2026; 8 months ago (Inaugural); 29 January 2026; 8 months ago (Commercial)
- Current operator: Southern Railways (SR)

Route
- Termini: Tambaram (TBM); Thiruvananthapuram Central (TVC)
- Stops: 17
- Distance travelled: 768 km (477 mi)
- Average journey time: 14 hrs 30 mins
- Service frequency: Weekly
- Train number: 16121/16122
- Lines used: Tambaram–Chengalpattu line; Viluppuram–Vriddhachalam–Tiruchchirappalli line; Dindigul–Madurai line; Virudhunagar–Tirunelveli line; Tirunelveli–Nagercoil line; Nagercoil–Thiruvananthapuram line

On-board services
- Class: Sleeper class coach (SL) General unreserved coach (GS)
- Seating arrangements: Yes
- Sleeping arrangements: Yes
- Auto-rack arrangements: Upper
- Catering facilities: On-board catering
- Observation facilities: Saffron-grey
- Entertainment facilities: Electric outlets; Reading lights; Bottle holder
- Other facilities: CCTV cameras; Bio-vacuum toilets; Foot-operated water taps; Passenger information system

Technical
- Rolling stock: Modified LHB coaches
- Track gauge: Indian gauge
- Electrification: 25 kV 50 Hz AC overhead line
- Operating speed: 53 km (33 mi) (Avg.)
- Track owner: Indian Railways
- Rake maintenance: Tambaram (TBM)
- Rake sharing: 16107/16108 Tambaram ⇔ Santragachi Amrit Bharat Express

The 16121/16122 Tambaram–Thiruvananthapuram Central Amrit Bharat Express is India's 25th non-AC Superfast Amrit Bharat Express train, which runs across the states of Tamil Nadu and Kerala by connecting the city of Chennai to the southern districts of Tamil Nadu, Tambaram serves as a vital third terminal that eases the load on the city's main hubs with Thiruvananthapuram Central, Kerala's busiest railway station.

The express train is inaugurated on 23 January 2026 by Honorable Prime Minister Narendra Modi through video conference.

== Overview ==
The train is operated by Indian Railways, connecting Tambaram and Thiruvananthapuram Central. It is currently operated 16121/16122 on weekly basis.

== Rakes ==
It is the 25th Amrit Bharat 2.0 Express train in which the locomotives were designed by Chittaranjan Locomotive Works (CLW) at Chittaranjan, West Bengal and the coaches were designed and manufactured by the Integral Coach Factory at Perambur, Chennai under the Make in India Initiative.

== Schedule ==
Train schedule: Tambaram ↔ Thiruvananthapuram Central Amrit Bharat Express
Train no.	Station code	Departure station	Departure time	Departure day	Arrival station	Arrival hours
16121	TBM	Tambaram	7:30 PM	Thiruvananthapuram Central	8:00 AM	14h 30m
16122	TVC	Thiruvananthapuram Central	10:40 AM	Tambaram	11:45 PM	13h 5m

== Routes and halts ==
The halts for this 16121/16122 Tambaram–Thiruvananthapuram Central Amrit Bharat Express are as follows:-

1. Tambaram
2. Chengalpattu Junction
3. Viluppuram Junction
4. Vriddhachalam Junction
5. Ariyalur
6. Srirangam
7. Tiruchchirappalli Junction
8. Dindigul Junction
9. Madurai Junction
10. Virudhunagar Junction
11. Satur
12. Kovilpatti
13. Tirunelveli Junction
14. Valliyur
15. Nagercoil Town
16. Kuzhithura
17. Thiruvananthapuram Central

== Rake share ==
Train has 1 rake share :

● 16107/08 Tambaram–Santragachi Amrit Bharat Express

== See also ==
- Amrit Bharat Express
- Vande Bharat Express
- Rajdhani Express
- Tambaram railway station
- Thiruvananthapuram Central railway station

== Notes ==
a. Runs a day in a week with both directions.
