= Parassala railway station =

Railway station in Kerala, India

Parassala

General information
- Location: Parassala, Thiruvananthapuram, Kerala; India
- Coordinates: 8.3399104°N 77.165571°E
- Elevation: 40 m (130 ft)
- System: Regional rail, Light rail & Commuter rail station
- Owner: Indian Railways
- Operator: Southern Railway zone
- Line: Thiruvananthapuram–Nagercoil–Kanyakumari line
- Platforms: 2
- Tracks: 2

Construction
- Structure type: At–grade
- Parking: Available

Other information
- Status: Functioning
- Station code: PASA
- Zone(s): Southern Railway zone
- Division(s): Thiruvananthapuram
- Fare zone: Indian Railways

History
- Opened: 1904; 122 years ago
Location
- Location within Kerala Location within India

Parassala railway station (station code: PASA) is an NSG–5 category Indian railway station in Thiruvananthapuram railway division of Southern Railway zone. It is a railway station in Thiruvananthapuram district, Kerala. It is the southernmost railway station in Kerala and simultaneously marks the beginning of Kanyakumari district, Tamil Nadu at Kaliyakkavilai, therefore serving both Kerala and Tamil Nadu border areas of the region.

== Services ==
=== Extension of trains ===
- Extension of Tiruchi–Tirunelveli Intercity Express 22627/22628 up to Thiruvananthapuram
- Extension of Thiruvananthapuram Central–Mangaluru 16603/16604 Mavali Express up to Kanniyakumari
- Extension of Mumbai Lokmanya Tilak –Thiruvananthapuram Central 16345/16346 Netravati Express up to Kanniyakumari

=== New train services ===
- A new overnight express from Velankanni to Kochuveli via Thanjavur Junction, Trichy Junction, Pudukkottai, Nagercoil Junction, Eraniel and Thiruvananthapuram Central
- Kaniyakumari to Vasco-Da-Gama (Goa) daily train via Thiruvananthapuram Central and Ernakulam
