= Eraniel railway station =

Railway station in Tamil Nadu, India

Eraniel
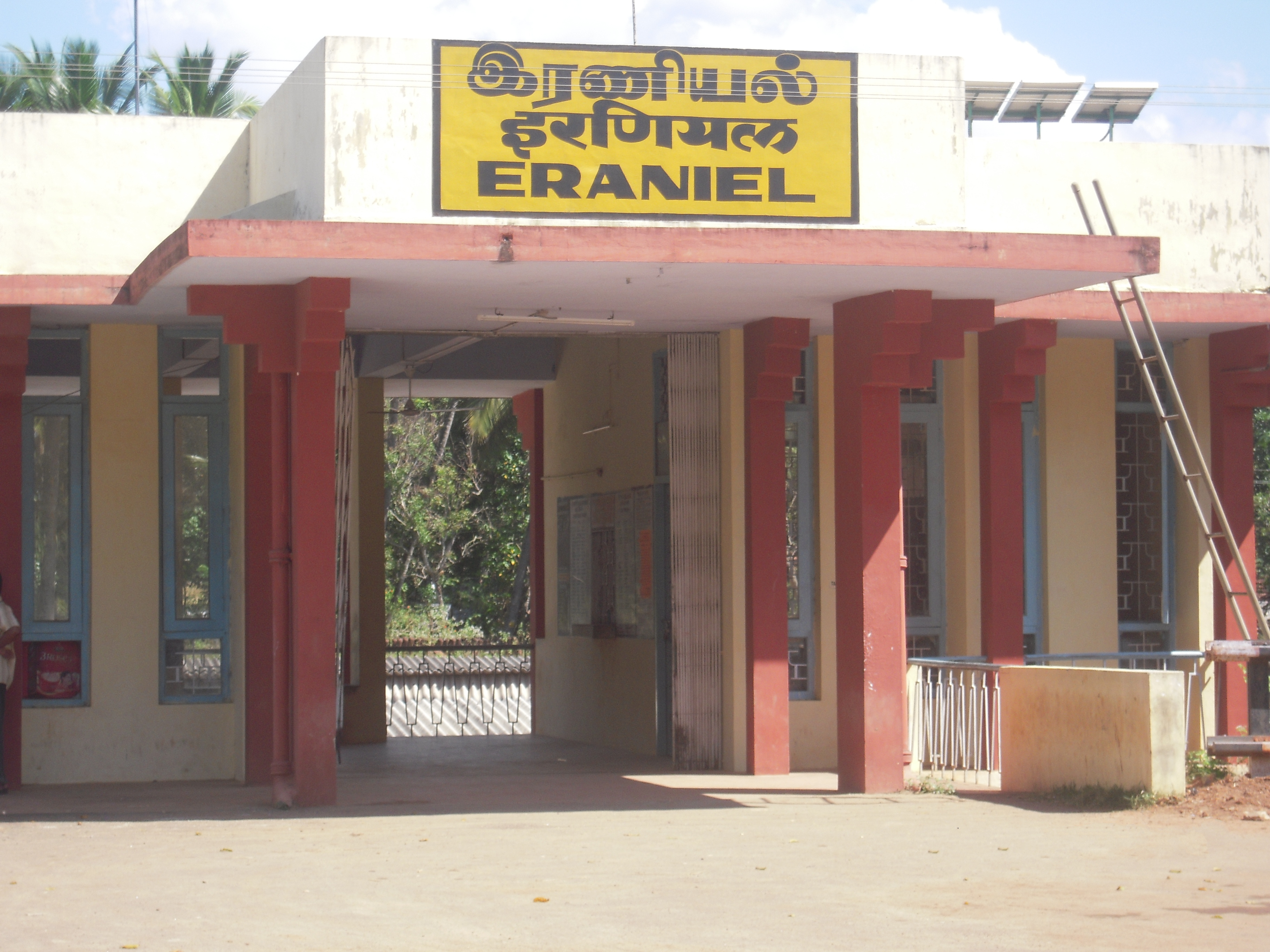
- The entrance of the station

General information
- Location: Opp. Neyyoor Hospital -Eraniel Konam Road, Neyyoor Post, Kanyakumari district, Tamil Nadu, Pincode- 629802; India
- Coordinates: 8°12′49″N 77°18′27″E
- Elevation: 19 metres (62 ft)
- System: Light rail station
- Owner: Indian Railways
- Operator: Southern Railway zone
- Line: Thiruvananthapuram–Nagercoil–Kanyakumari line
- Platforms: 2
- Tracks: 2
- Connections: Auto stand

Construction
- Structure type: Standard (on-ground station)
- Parking: Available
- Accessible: Eraniel

Other information
- Status: Functioning
- Station code: ERL
- Zone(s): Southern Railway zone
- Division(s): Thiruvananthapuram

History
- Opened: April 14, 1979; 47 years ago

Passengers
- 1,27,442: 1,27,442
Location
- Location within Tamil Nadu

Eraniel Railway station (station code: ERL) is an NSG–5 category Indian railway station in Thiruvananthapuram railway division of Southern Railway zone. It in Eraniel is the most important railway station of Kallkkulam taluk of Kanyakumari district in the Tamil Nadu state of India. All daily trains passing through the station halts in Eraniel station. The famous Mandaikadu Bagavathi Amman Temple, Colachel Port, I.R.E Industries in Manavalakurichi and Padmanabhapuram Palace are situated nearby the station. The station also is the nearest railhead for two municipalities – Padmanabapuram, Colachel and for 25 villages.

== Revenue ==
Year	Grade	Total Rs.	Growth %
2009–10	E	55,23,102	
2010–11	E	73,45,238	
2011–12	E	82,02,963	11.68

== Services ==
=== Extension of trains ===
- Extension of Tiruchi–Tirunelveli Intercity Express 22627/22628 up to Thiruvananthapuram
- Extension of Thiruvananthapuram Central–Mangaluru 16603/16604 Mavali Express up to Kanniyakumari
- Extension of Mumbai Lokmanya Tilak–Thiruvananthapuram Central 16345/16346 Netravati Express up to Kanniyakumari

=== New train services ===
- A new overnight express from Velankanni to Kochuveli via Thanjavur Junction, Trichy Junction, Pudukkottai, Nagercoil Junction, Eraniel and Thiruvananthapuram Central
- Kaniyakumari to Vasco-Da-Gama (Goa) daily train via Thiruvananthapuram Central and Ernakulam

== Transfer Division ==
The Thiruvananthapuram–Nagercoil–Kanyakumari railway line was opened on 16 April 1979, and was then under Madurai division. Thiruvananthapuram division was formed on second October 1979 carving out certain sections from Madurai division. The metre-gauge sections of Madurai division were retained, while all the newly laid broad-gauge sections of Madurai division were transferred to Thiruvananthapuram division. Thus, the Thiruvananthapuram–Nagercoil–Kanyakumari BG line, and the under-construction Tirunelveli–Nagercoil BG line were transferred to Thiruvananthapuram division. It was then mentioned that when the Tirunelveli–Madurai line is converted into BG line the sections falling under Kanyakumari district and Tirunelveli district would be transferred back to Madurai division. The Thrunelveli–Madurai line was converted into BG line on 8-4-1981 and ever since people from south Tamil Nadu have been demanding the merger of Kanyakumari BG line with Madurai division.

Ever since its inception, Kanyakumari district has been willfully neglected by Thiruvananthapuram division, be it in providing railway infrastructure, providing the required train services, passenger amenities etc. Kanyakumari terminal station lacks the required railway infrastructures and therefore request for more train services were always turned down by them citing the same handicap as the reason. Kanyakumari district people are demanding transfer Kanyakumari–Nagercoil–Kuzhithurai–Thiruvananthapuram (except Thiruvananthapuram station) and Nagercoil–Tirunelveli (up to Melappalayam) section to Madurai division, at the earliest. It is also stressed that under any circumstances, the above places should be under the administration of southern railway zone that is with Chennai only. Even in future also this area should not be attached with any other zone including Trivandrum, Kerala.

== Suburban stations ==
Station name	Station code
Nagercoil railway station	NCJ
Nagercoil Town	NJT
Kanniyakumari	CAPE
Kulitthurai	KZT
Eraniel	ERL
Aralvaymozhi	AAY
Palliyadi	PYD
Kulitthurai West	KZTW
Viranialur	VRLR
Suchindram	SUCH
Tovalai	THX
