= Manavalakurichi =

- Town
- Nickname: Manavai
- Location in Tamil Nadu, India
- Coordinates: 8.13°N 77.3°E
- Country: India
- State: Tamil Nadu
- District: Kanniyakumari
- Elevation: 0 m (0 ft)

Population (2011)
  - Total: 10,969

Languages
  - Official: Tamil
- Time zone: UTC+5:30 (IST)
- Postal code: 629252

Manavalakurichi is a panchayat town in Kanniyakumari district in the Indian state of Tamil Nadu. It is hardly 60 km from Thiruvananthapuram, the capital city of Kerala. Tamil and Malayalam are the common languages of people living here.

Manavalakurichi has an average elevation of 0 metres (0 ft)).

== Sea ports ==
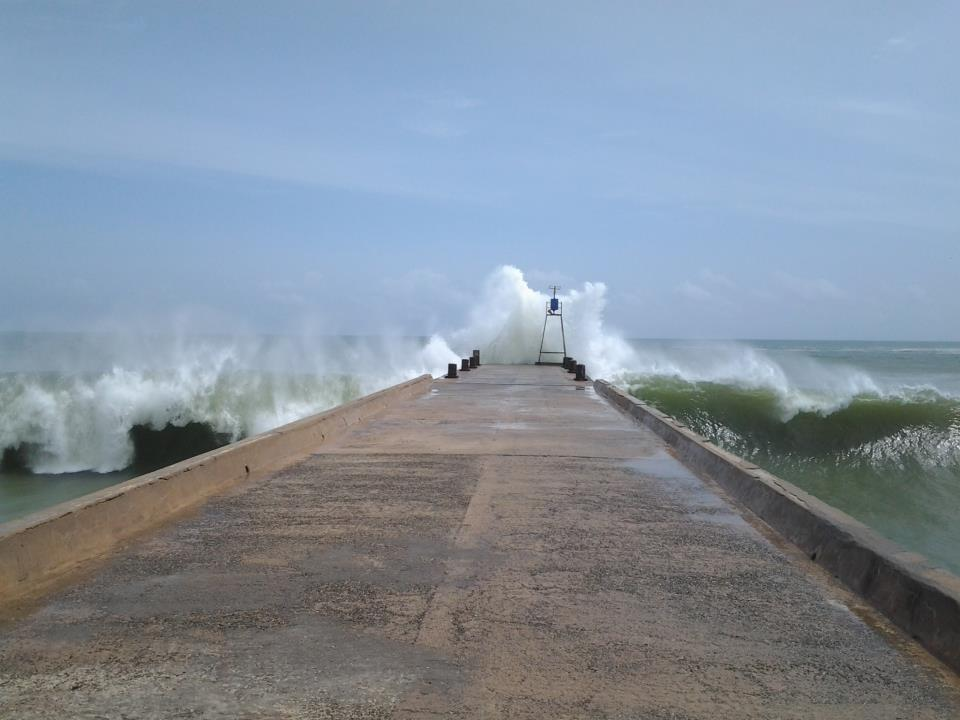
Kolachal Sea Port

Jeppiaar Fishing Harbour in Muttom is the nearest sea port. This is a private sea port and was built by educationalist and business man Jeppiaar.

Another near sea port is Kolachal. It is an ancient port, aging back to 18th century. Vasco da Gama called it "Colachi". After the defeat of the Dutch by King Anizham Thirunal Marthanda Varma in Battle of Colachel on 10 August 1741, a victory pillar had been erected near the beach in commemoration of the victory.

== Roads ==
The town is well connected to all parts of the state through road. Nagercoil, the district headquarters of Kanyakumari, is situated 20 km from Manavalakurichi in the north-east direction. Direct bus service from Manavalakurichi is available to Thiruvananthapuram the capital city of Kerala. This journey usually takes less than two hours. Frequent bus service to Thuckalay, another town which is 11 km away, is also available.

== Rail ==
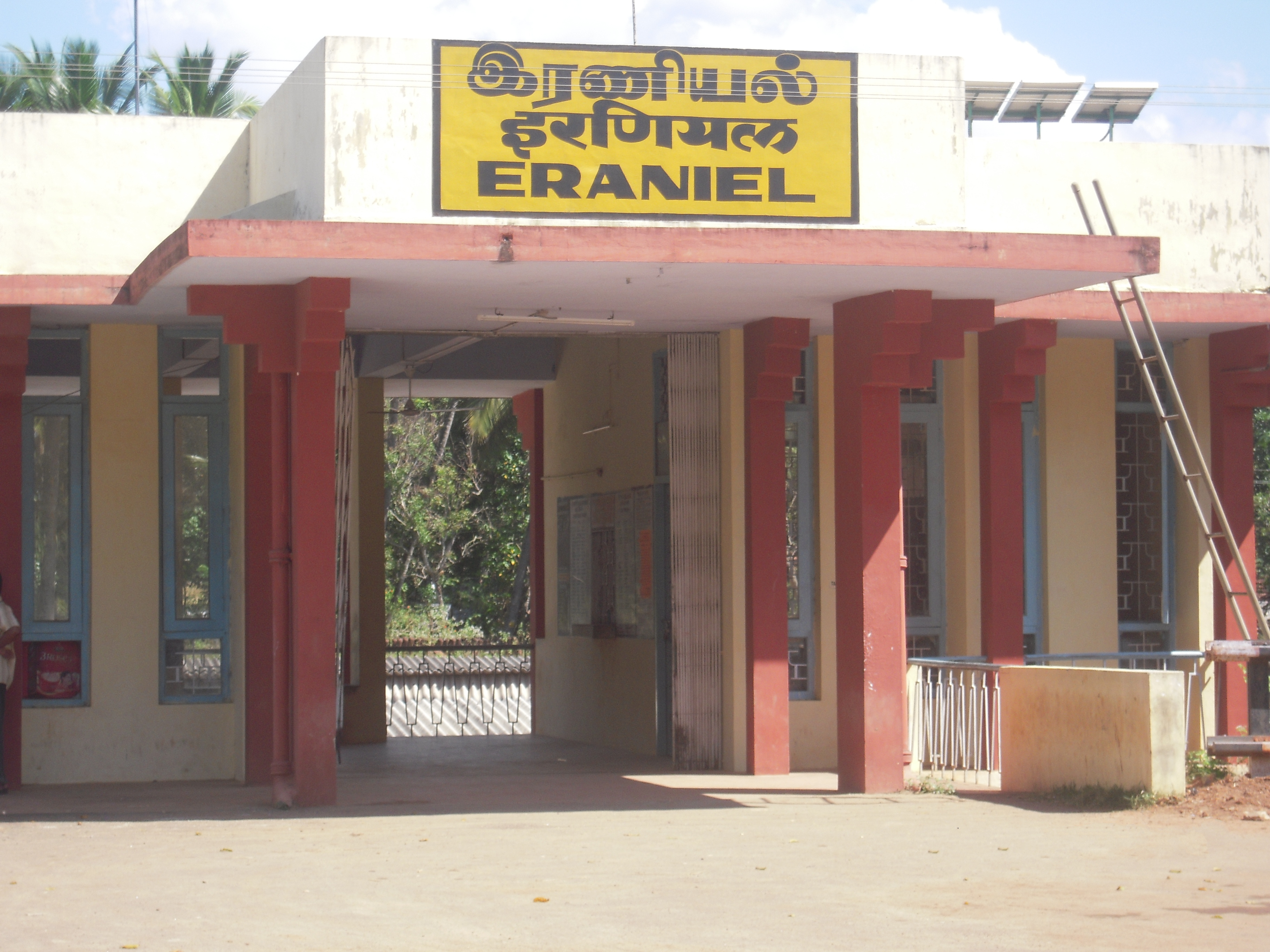
Eraniel railway station

Eraniel railway station is the nearest railway station. The station has two platforms and falls on the Kanyakumari–Thiruvananthapuram line in the Thiruvananthapuram division of the Southern Railway zone. All daily trains passing through the station halt in Eraniel station. The route from Eraniel to Thiruvananthapuram runs through tunnels and hilly terrains. It takes one hour from Thiruvananthapuram to Eraniel by train. The Mandaikadu Bagavathi Amman Temple, Kolachal Port, I.R.E Industries in Manavalakurichi and Padmanabhapuram Palace are situated nearby the station. The station also is the nearest railhead for two municipalities – Padmanabapuram, Colachel and for 25 villages.

== Air ==
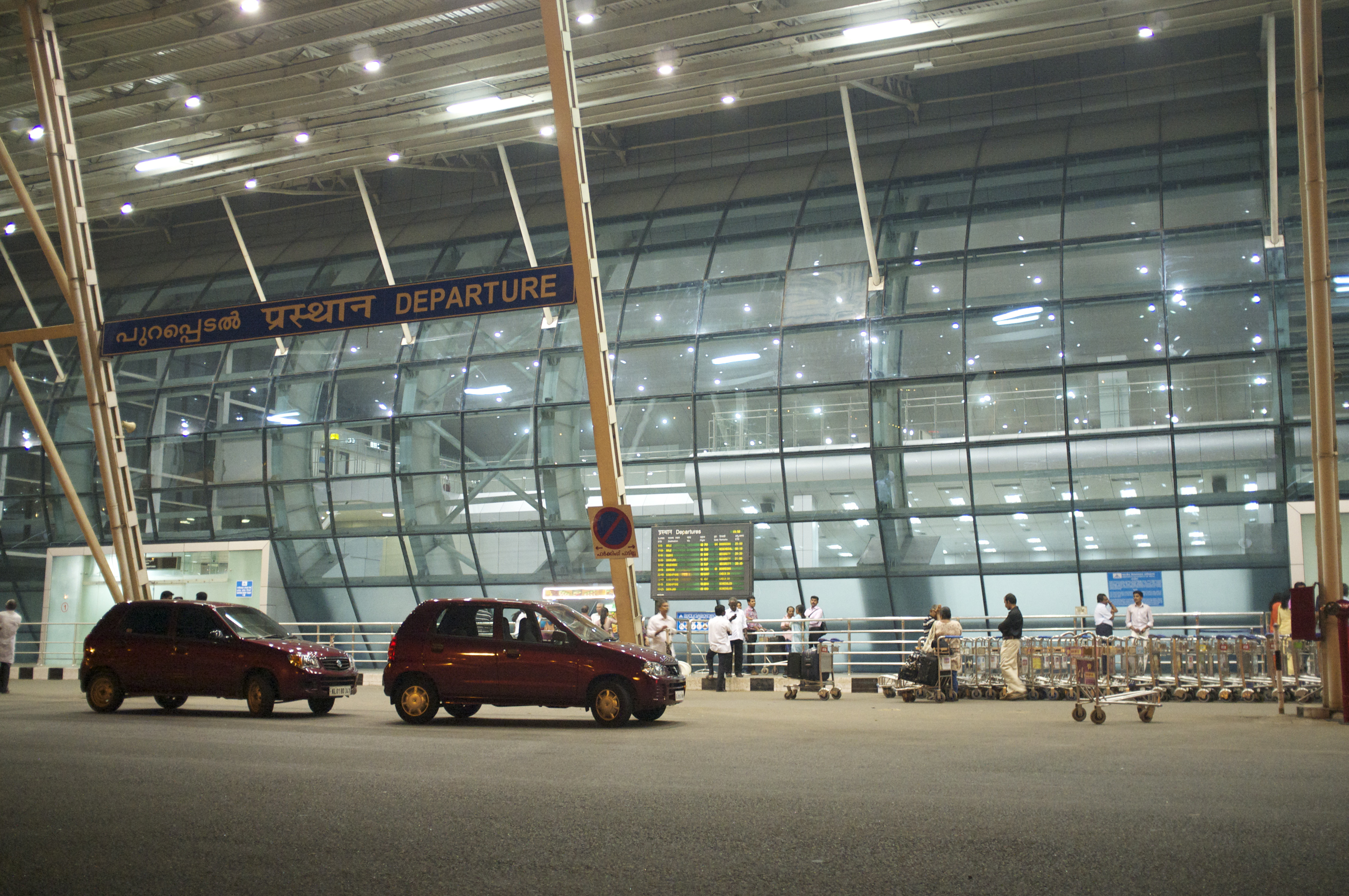
Thiruvananthapuram International Airport

The nearest international airport is Thiruvananthapuram International Airport. Thiruvananthapuram connects the town further to other major cities like Bangalore, Mumbai, Cochin, Delhi, Goa, and Chennai.

== Demographics ==
As of 2011 India census, had a total population of 10,969 with males 5478 marginally less over females 5491. Manavalakurichi has an average literacy rate of 79%, higher than the national average of 59.5%: male literacy is 81%, and female literacy is 77%. In Manavalakurichi, 11% of the population is under 6 years of age.
