= Kotticode =

- town
- Location in Tamil Nadu, India
- Coordinates: 8°17′48″N 77°19′27″E
- Country: India
- State: Tamil Nadu
- District: Kanyakumari

Population (2001)
  - Total: 13,759

Languages
  - Official: Tamil
- Time zone: UTC+5:30 (IST)
- Postal code: 629164

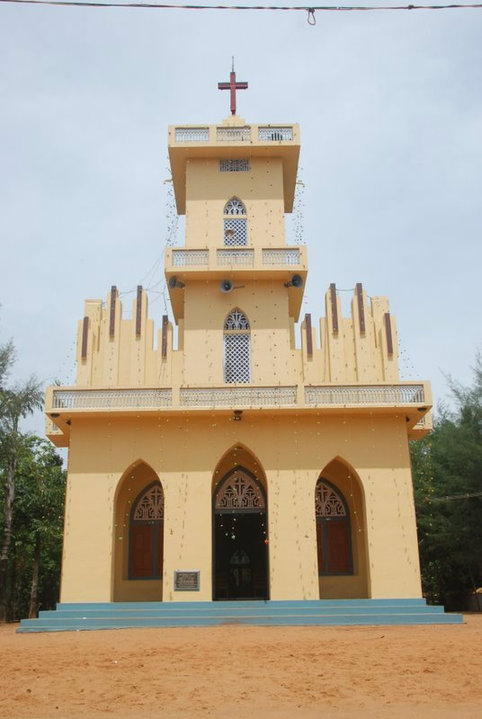
Kotticode C.S.I Church

Kotticode is a town in the Kanniyakumari district in the Indian state of Tamil Nadu near the southern tip of India.

== History ==
The Panchayat town was once part of the Travancore Kingdom. After the States Reorganisation Act was passed, Kotticode became a part of the state of Tamil Nadu.

== Nearby ==
Kotticode is located at Kalkulam Taluk in the Kanyakumari District of Tamil Nadu. Kotticode is located at about 8 km from Thuckalay, 26 km from Boothapandi, 11 km from Eraniel, 20 km from Nagercoil, 41 km from Kanyakumari and 61 km from Thiruvananthapuram. The nearest railway station is located at Eraniel and the nearest airport is located at Thiruvananthapuram.
