= Kuzhithura railway station =

Railway station in Tamil Nadu, India

Kuzhithurai
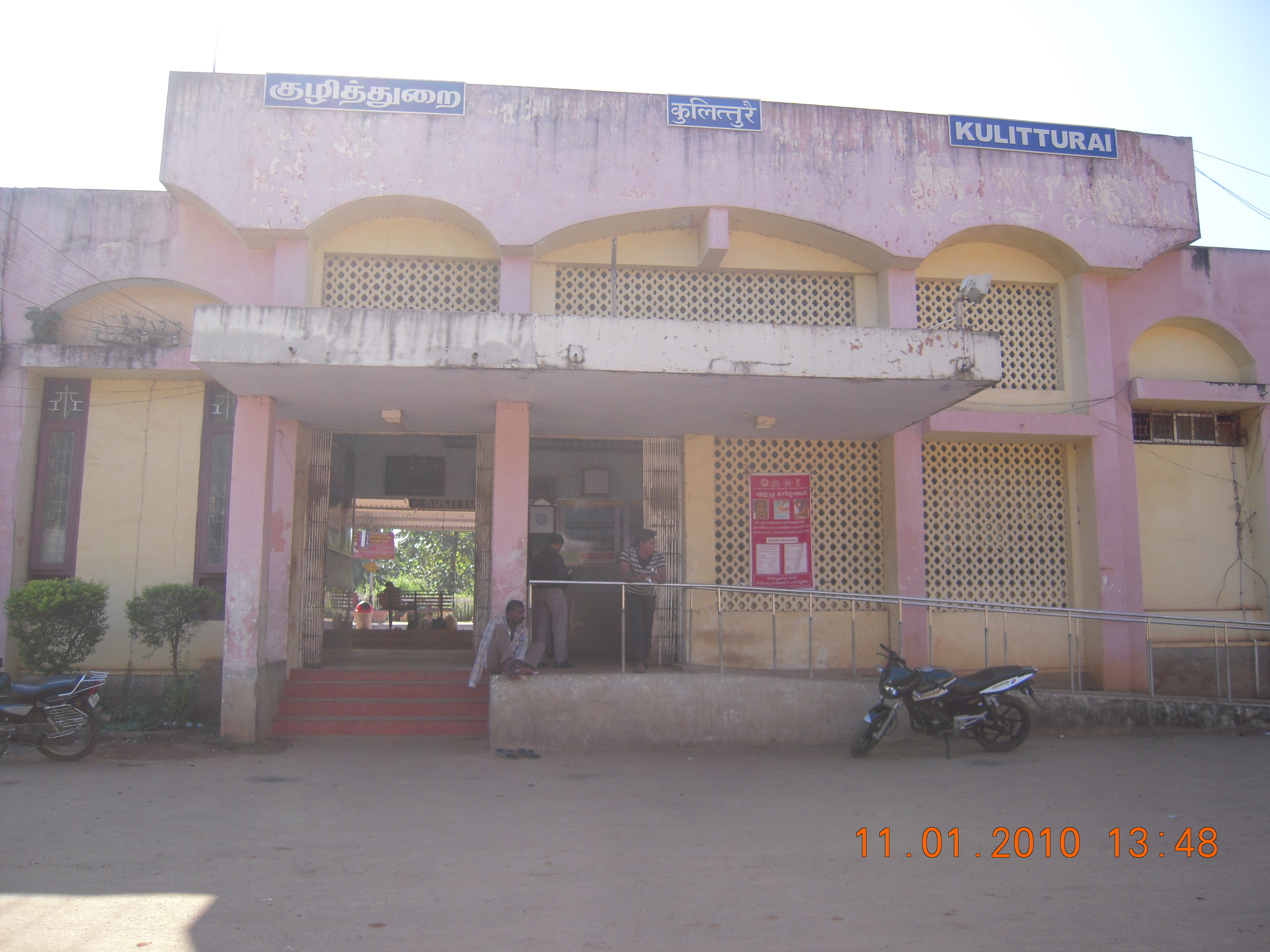
- The entrance of the station

General information
- Location: Marthandam, Marthandam, Kanyakumari, Tamil Nadu; India
- Coordinates: 8.301111°N 77.218611°E
- Elevation: 19 metres (62 ft)
- System: Light rail station
- Owner: Indian Railways
- Line: Thiruvananthapuram–Nagercoil–Kanyakumari line
- Platforms: 2
- Tracks: 2
- Connections: Bus, auto & taxi stand Marthandam bus station of the TNSTC

Construction
- Structure type: Standard
- Parking: Available
- Accessible: Disabled access

Other information
- Status: Functioning
- Station code: KZT
- Zone(s): Southern Railway zone
- Division(s): Trivandrum

History
- Opened: 15 April 1979; 47 years ago
- Electrified: Yes 25 kV AC 50 Hz

Passengers
- 50000
Location

Kuzhithurai railway station (Station code: KZT) is the second-biggest station in Kanyakumari district (NSG 5 Category). For train transportation the Marthandam is the main hub for Kalkulam and Vilavancode talukas. The Kalkulam and Vilavancode talukas have the population around seven lakes. The Kuzhithurai station is found to be centered between Trivandrum–Kanniyakumari railway route. This railway station collection is more than seven crore per annum and a daily passenger patronage of more than 50,000 people. The station has two platforms and falls on the Kanniyakumari–Trivandrum line in the Trivandrum division of the Southern Railway zone. Most of all daily trains passing through the station halt in Kuzhithurai station

== Projects and development ==
It is one of the 73 stations in Tamil Nadu to be named for upgradation under Amrit Bharat Station Scheme of Indian Railways.

== Demanded Rail Services ==
- Extension of Trivandrum–Mangalore 16603/16604 Mavali Express up to Nagercoil
- A new overnight express from Velankanni to Kollam via Thanjavur, Trichy, Pudukkottai, Tirunelveli, Nagercoil, Kuzhithura and Trivandrum
- Kanniyakumari to Vasco da Gama, Goa daily train via Trivandrum and Ernakulam
- Kochuveli–Bangalore Overnight Express train via Kuzhithura, Nagercoil, Madurai, Erode, Salem and Hosur

== See also ==
- Eraniel railway station
- Viranialur railway station
- Southern Railway zone
- Indian Railways
