= Eraniel Palace =

Coordinates: 8.207854°N 77.317804°E

Eraniel Palace is a small (currently dilapidated) palace located near Eraniel village, Kanyakumari district, Tamil Nadu, South India and is considered a treasure-trove of Travancore and Venad history.

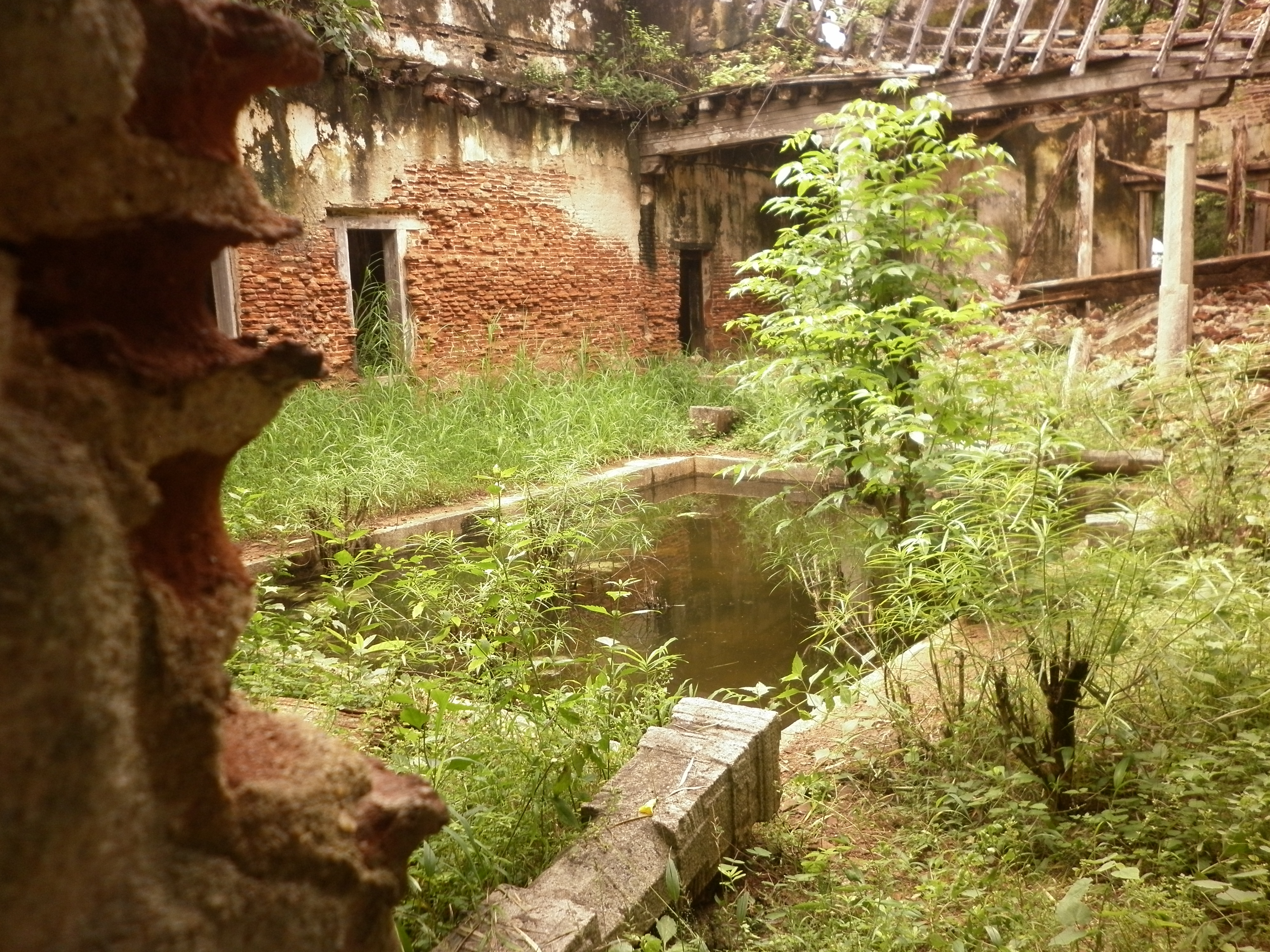
Interior of the palace

== History ==
The palace was an important place of political and commercial importance in South India, since Eraniel town was a seasonal capital of the Venad kingdom until the seventeenth century when Padmanabhapuram came into prominence. However, in the 21st century, only some modest glimpses of the old royal heritage of the historic Eraniel town can be found in the remains of the old palace (Thekkaethevan Koikkal), "its ornate granite pillars, some timber beams, decaying walls that seem ready to fall anytime soon, and the already collapsed roof."

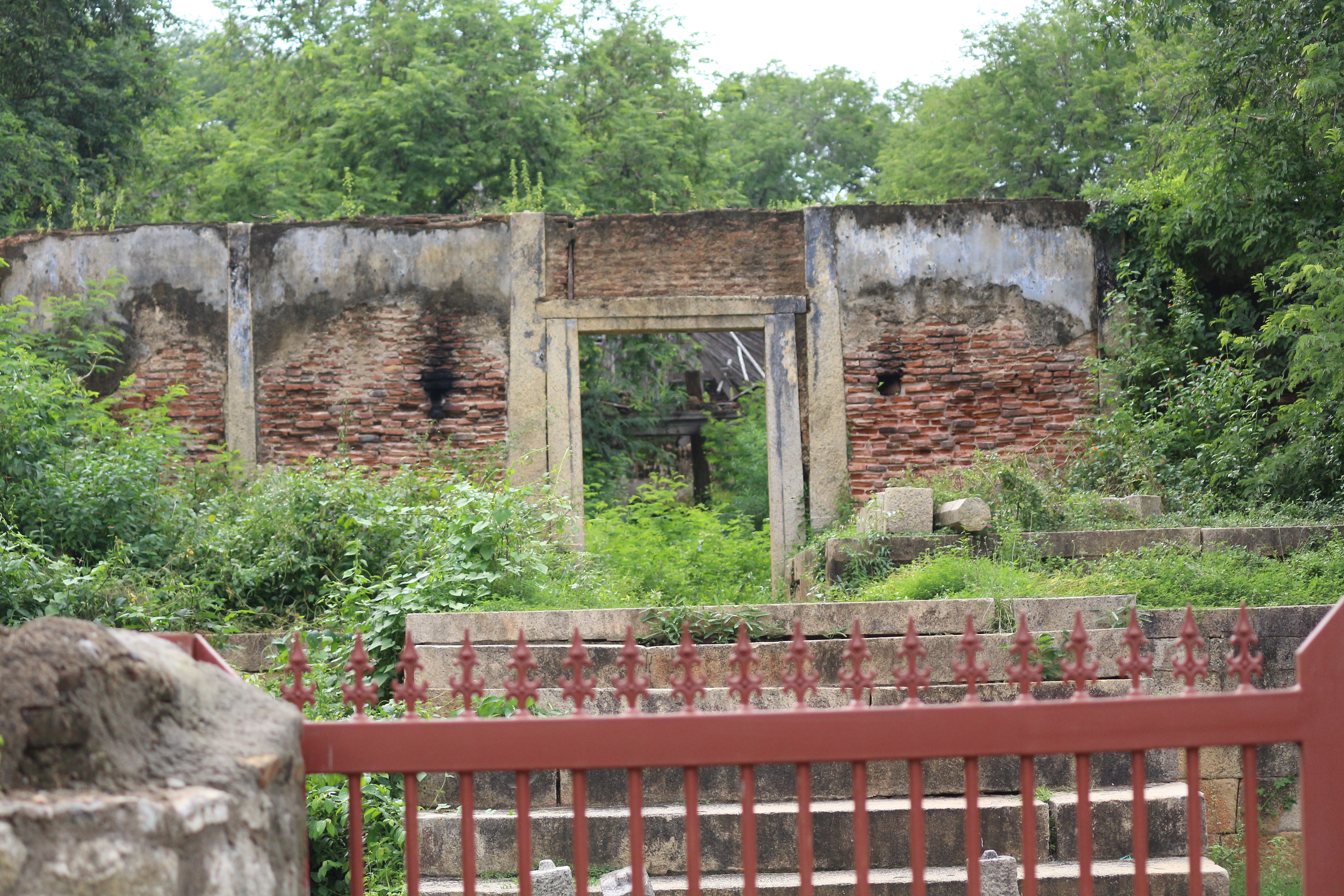
View of the palace from the entrance

== Architecture ==
The present day Eraniel palace complex spreads over slightly more than three-and-one-half acres. However, it is mostly in dilapidated condition due to decades of neglect. Currently, only three identifiable parts of the palace remains:

- The Padippura (ml:പടിപ്പുര) or the majestic entrance gateway leading to the main palace (this is currently in total ruins)
- The Kuthira malika (translation: Mansion of horses), the main area of the palace, that was a modest double storied courtyard house
- The Vasantha mandapam (translation: Spring pavilion), a detached pavilion built on top of an elevated platform. It is replete with beautiful carvings. It is located on the western side of the palace complex. There used to be an ever burning lamp in the Vasanta mandapam, kept as a memorial to a miraculous incident that happened centuries ago, as documented by Emily Gilchriest Hatch, the author of Travancore – A Guide Book for the Visitor (1933).

The palace compound also has a pond within, that was probably used by the royalty. Dressed granite blocks were used to perfectly line and bound the sides of this pond.

== Restoration ==
The palace is owned by Government of Tamil Nadu but there is almost zero management or maintenance, that led to its present-day dilapidated condition. Although the Government had announced plans (subscription required)to reconstruct the complex and the Hindu Religious and Charitable Endowments Department has made estimates to invite tenders, the palace complex remains in ruins and uncared for.

== See also ==
- Kuthira Malika, Thiruvananthapuram
- Padmanabhapuram Palace
- Kerala Architecture
- Kuttalam Palace
