= Thingalnagar =

Town panchayat in Tamil Nadu, India

Thingalnagar Monday Market
- Town panchayat
- Nickname: Thingal Santhai
- Location in Tamil Nadu, India Thingalnagar (India)
- Country: India
- State: Tamil Nadu
- District: Kanniyakumari

Population (2001)
  - Total: 12,554

Languages
  - Official: Tamil
- Time zone: UTC+5:30 (IST)

Thingalnagar is the town panchayat, located in Kanniyakumari district in the Indian state of Tamil Nadu.

The origin of the name "Thingalnagar" ("Monday Market" in English) is that every Monday, people from several nearby villages, wholesalers, and farmers for trading gather at the market. Markets can be found in Thingalnagar selling fresh marine fish, vegetables, and pets.

Religion 62.3% Christians and 25% hindus according to census 2011

== Demographics ==
As of the 2001 Census of India, Thingalnagar has a population of 12,554. Males constitute 49% of the population, and females 51%. Thingalnagar has an average literacy rate of 78%, higher than the national average of 59.5%; male literacy is 81%, and female literacy is 76%. In Thingalnagar, 10% of the population is under 6 years of age.

== Education ==
- Nursing College, Neyyoor
- CSI Medical College, Neyyoor
- Government Higher Secondary School, Eraniel
- Government Girls High School, Eraniel
- L.M.S. Girls Higher Secondary School
- St. Francis Xavier Primary & Higher Secondary School, Mankuzhy
- Amala convent girls higher secondary school, Thuckalay.
