= Suchindram railway station =

Railway station in Tamil Nadu, India

Coordinates: 8.1493°N 77.4665°E

General information

Other information
- Station code: SCH
Location
- Location within India Location within Tamil Nadu

Suchindram railway station (station code: SCH) is found between Thiruvananthapuram–Nagercoil–Kanyakumari line. It is in Suchindrum panchayat. The station has one platform and falls on the Kanyakumari–Thiruvananthapuram line in the Thiruvananthapuram railway division of the Southern Railway zone. At present no trains halt at this station.
