= Nagercoil Town railway station =

Railway station in Tamil Nadu, India

Nagercoil Town

General information
- Coordinates: 8.1997°N 77.4200°E
- Platforms: 3
- Tracks: 3

Other information
- Status: Functioning
- Station code: NJT
Location
- Location within India Location within Tamil Nadu

Nagercoil Town railway station (station code: NJT) is an NSG–5 category Indian railway station in Thiruvananthapuram railway division of Southern Railway zone. It is a railway station located on the Kanyakumari district in Tamil Nadu, India. It is on the Thiruvananthapuram–Nagercoil–Kanyakumari railway line between the Aaloor railway station and the Nagercoil Junction railway station. Nineteen trains halt on this station which has one platform. The station is in proximity to Vadasery bus stand and Vetturnimadam. Recently, this station handles most of the trains passing through Nagercoil as, the trains can avoid loco reversal and rake reversal in Nagercoil Junction railway station and can actually save time.

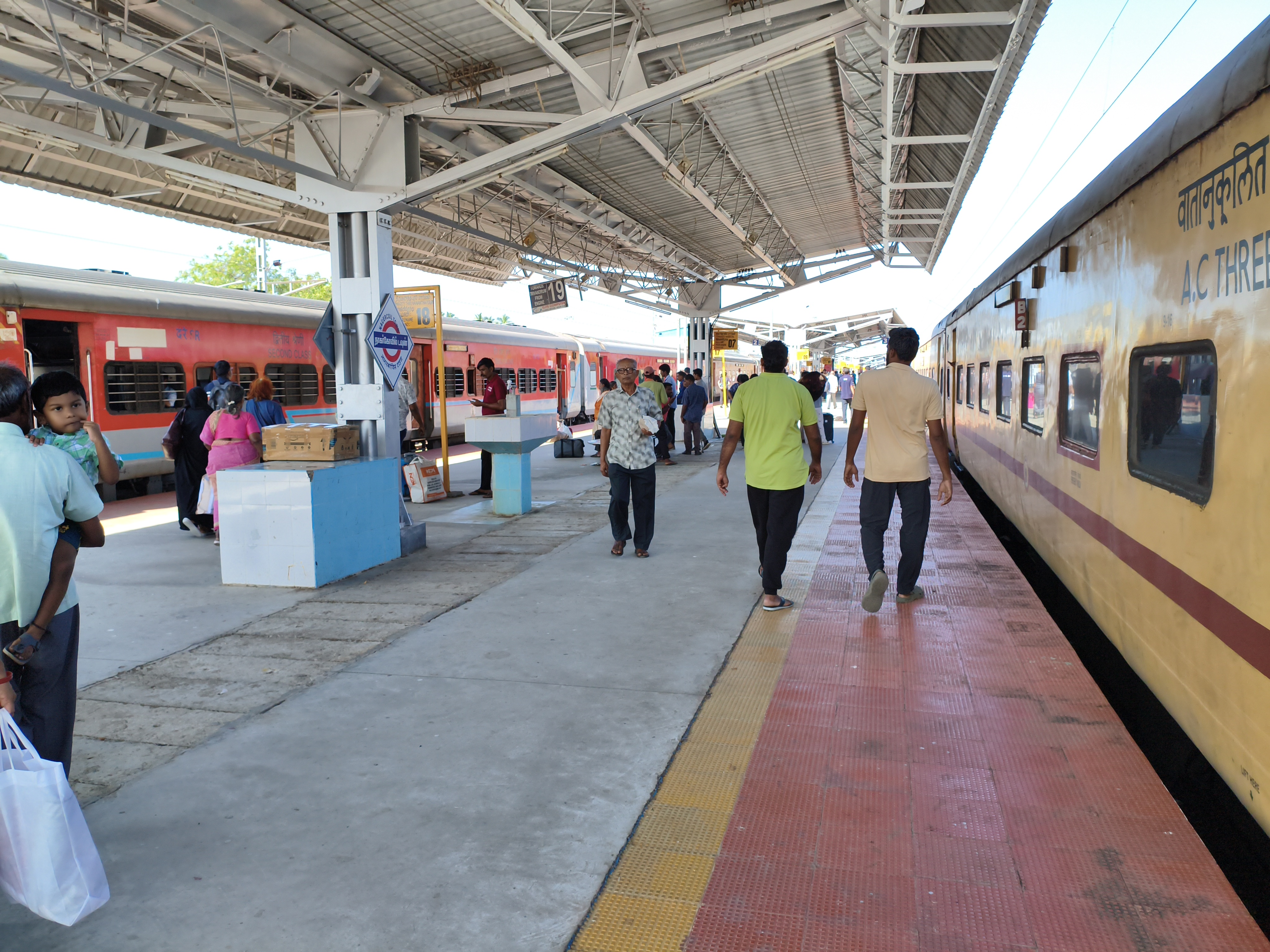
Nagercoil Town railway station platform

== Services ==
19 trains halt at this station.
