= Tambaram–Santragachi Amrit Bharat Express =

Amrit Bharat Express train route in India

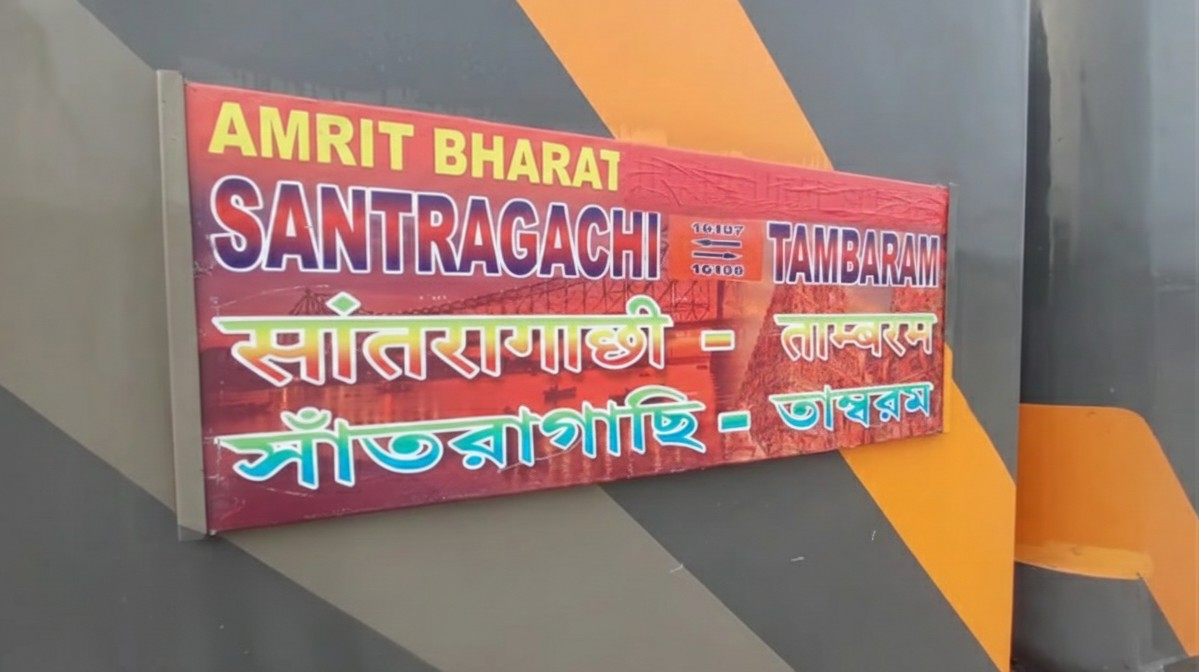

Overview
- Service type: Amrit Bharat Express, Superfast Express Train
- Status: Active
- Locale: Tamil Nadu, Andhra Pradesh, Odisha and West Bengal
- First service: 18 January 2026; 7 months ago (Inaugural); 23 January 2026; 6 months ago (Commercial)
- Current operator: Southern Railways (SR)

Route
- Termini: Tambaram (TBM); Santragachi Junction (SRC)
- Stops: 28
- Distance travelled: 1,668 km (1,036 mi)
- Average journey time: 28 hrs 45 mins
- Service frequency: Weekly (Note: 16107 – Fridays | 16108 – Saturdays)
- Train number: 16107 / 16108
- Lines used: Tambaram–Chennai Egmore line towards ( Sullurupeta, Nellore, Chirala ) etc., Vijayawada–Duvvada line; Vizianagaram–Khurda Road line; Cuttack–Kharagpur line; Kharagpur–Santragachi line

On-board services
- Class: Sleeper class coach (SL) General unreserved coach (GS)
- Seating arrangements: Yes
- Sleeping arrangements: Yes
- Catering facilities: On-board catering
- Observation facilities: Saffron-grey livery
- Entertainment facilities: On-board WiFi; Infotainment system; Electric outlets; Reading light; Seat pockets; Bottle holder; Tray table
- Baggage facilities: Overhead racks
- Other facilities: Kavach

Technical
- Rolling stock: LHB Coach
- Track gauge: Indian gauge
- Electrification: 25 kV 50 Hz AC overhead line
- Operating speed: 58 km/h (36 mph) (Avg.)
- Track owner: Indian Railways
- Rake maintenance: Tambaram (TBM)
- Rake sharing: 16121/16122 Tambaram ⇔ Trivandrum Central Amrit Bharat Express

The 16107/16108 Tambaram–Santragachi Amrit Bharat Express is India's 22nd Non-AC Superfast Amrit Bharat Express train, which runs across the states of Tamil Nadu, Andhra Pradesh, Odisha and West Bengal by connecting the capital city of Tamil Nadu, Chennai but mainly touching Tambaram city with Howrah, the state and industrial city of West Bengal.

This express train is inaugurated on 18 January 2026 by Honorable Prime Minister Narendra Modi through video conference.

== Overview ==
This train will be operated by Indian Railways, connecting Tambaram and Santragachi Junction. It is currently operated with train numbers 16107/16108 on weekly basis.

== Rakes ==
It is the 22nd Amrit Bharat 2.0 Express train in which the locomotives were designed by Chittaranjan Locomotive Works (CLW) at Chittaranjan, West Bengal and the coaches were designed and manufactured by the Integral Coach Factory at Perambur, Chennai under the Make in India initiative.

== Schedule ==
Train schedule: Tambaram ↔ Santragachi Amrit Bharat Express
Train no.	Station code	Departure station	Departure time	Departure day	Arrival station	Arrival hours
16107	TBM	Tambaram	3:30 PM	Santragachi Junction	8:15 PM	28h 45m
16108	SRC	Santragachi Junction	11:55 PM	Tambaram	10:00 AM	34h 5m

== Routes and halts ==
The halts for this 16107/16108 Tambaram–Santragachi Amrit Bharat Express are as follows:-

1. Tambaram
2. Chennai Egmore
3. Sullurupeta
4. Nellore
5. Ongole
6. Chirala
7. Tenali Junction
8. Vijayawada Junction
9. Eluru
10. Rajahmundry
11. Samalkot Junction
12. Anakapalle
13. Duvvada
14. Pendurti
15. Kottavalasa Junction
16. Vizianagaram Junction
17. Srikakulam Road
18. Palasa
19. Brahmapur
20. Balugaon
21. Khurda Road Junction
22. Bhubaneswar
23. Cuttack Junction
24. Jajpur Keonjhar Road
25. Bhadrak
26. Baleshwar
27. Kharagpur Junction
28. Santragachi Junction

== Rake reversal ==
No rake reversal or rake share.

== See also ==
- Amrit Bharat Express
- Vande Bharat Express
- Tejas Express
- Gatimaan Express
- Tambaram
- Santragachi Junction

== Notes ==
Runs a day in a week with both directions.
