= Nagercoil–Tirunelveli line =

Railway line in India

Nagercoil–Tirunelveli railway line
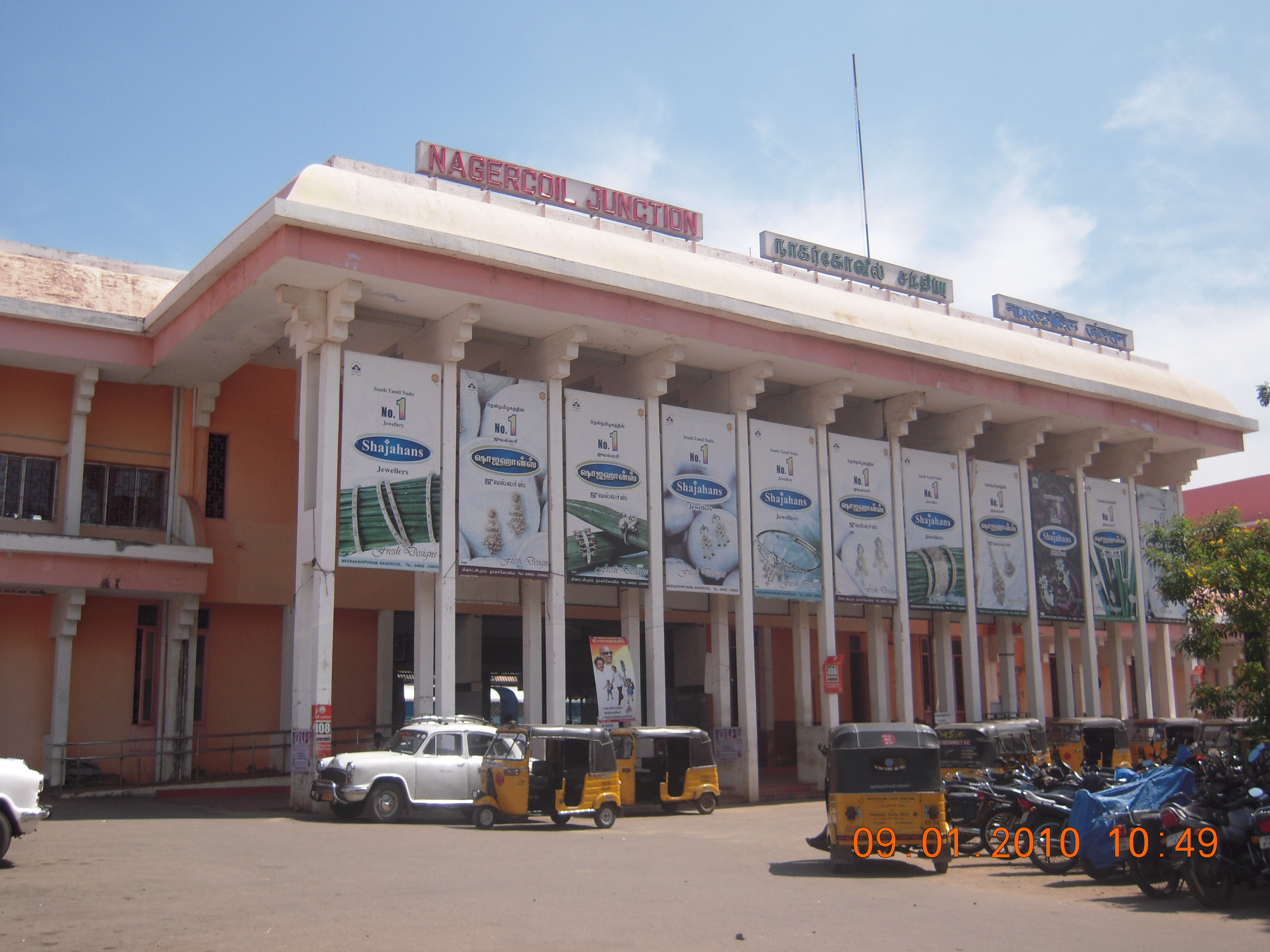
- Main Building of the Nagercoil Junction station

Overview
- Native name: நாகர்கோவில்-திருநெல்வேலி ரயில் பாதை
- Status: Operational
- Owner: Southern Railway zone
- Locale: Tamilnadu
- Termini: Nagercoil Junction (NCJ); Tirunelveli Junction (TEN)
- Stations: 9
- Website: Southern Railway

Service
- Type: Regional rail Light rail
- System: Electrified
- Services: 1
- Operator(s): Thiruvananthapuram; Madurai
- Rolling stock: WAP-1, WAP-4 electric locos; WDS-6, WDM-2, WDM-3A, WDP-4 and WDG-3A, WDG-4

History
- Opened: 1981; 45 years ago

Technical
- Line length: 73 kilometres (45 mi)
- Number of tracks: 2
- Track gauge: 1,676 mm (5 ft 6 in)
- Loading gauge: 4,725 mm × 3,660 mm (15 ft 6.0 in × 12 ft 0.1 in) (BG)
- Electrification: Overhead catenary
- Operating speed: 100 kilometres per hour (62 mph)

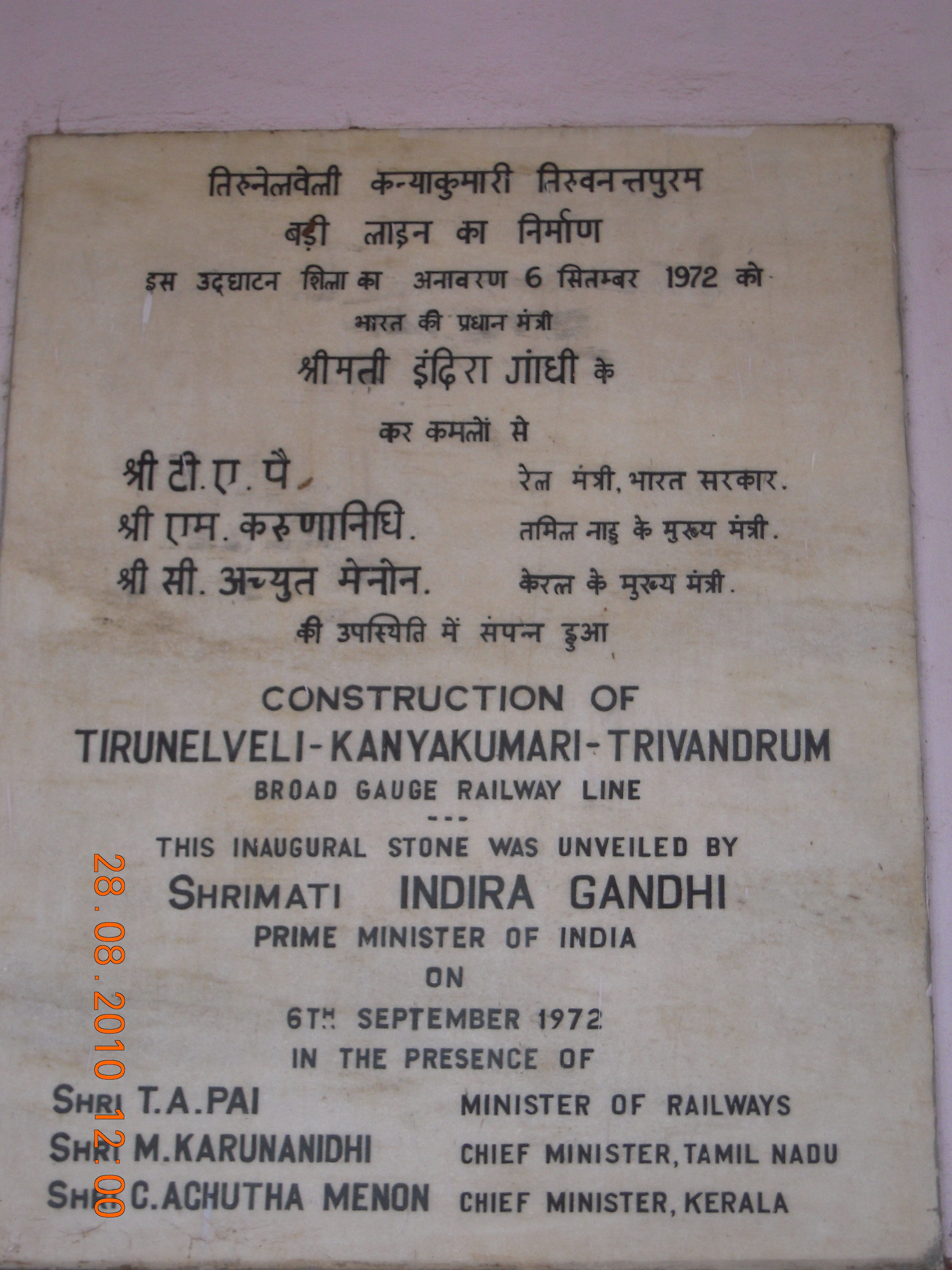
Foundation Stone

The Nagercoil–Tirunelveli line connects the cities of Tirunelveli and Nagercoil in the state of Tamilnadu in Southern Railway zone. Thiruvananthapuram–Nagercoil–Kanyakumari line and Tirunelveli–Nagercoil construction projects were inaugurated by Prime Minister Indira Gandhi on 6 September 1972. The maximum speed of trains running between Tirunelveli to Nagercoil is 100 km per hour.

== History and timeline ==
- 1955-1956: Survey for this line was sanctioned.
- 1964-1965: The survey completed.
- 6 September 1972: The inauguration of the construction project by the then Prime minister Mrs.Indira Gandhi.
- 1981: The line have been opened to traffic.

== Stations ==
There are 9 railway stations along the stretch. The major stations are Nagercoil Junction, Aralvaymoli, Valliyur, Nanguneri and Tirunelveli Junction. The details of the railway stations with annual earnings in 2016-2017 is shown below.

Sl. No	Station Name	Category (based on Earnings 2011-12)	Earnings during 2016-17 (in INR)	Total no. of passengers booked during 2016-17	Pass per day	Daily average earnings during 2016-17 (in INR)
1	Nagercoil Junction (NCJ)	NSG 3/A	464332656	2380085	6521	1272144
2	Tovalai (THX)	HG 3/F	215745	16509	45	591
3	Aralvaymoli (AAY)	NSG 6/E	3572159	44755	123	9787
4	North Panakudi (NPK)	NSG 6/E	1479006	18464	51	4052
5	Valliyur (VLY)	NSG 5/D	73942307	264688	725	202582
6	Nanguneri (NNN)	NSG 5/D	15122696	104161	285	41432
7	Sengulam (SGLM)	NSG 6/E	96070	1819	5	263
8	Melappalaiyam (MP)	HG 3/F	191390	11225	31	524
9	Tirunelveli Junction (TEN)	NSG 3/A	854317786	4734404	12971	2340597

**Note:-

1. Stations with blue background - Stations generating Rs. 2,00,00,000(Rs. 2 Crore) or more in a financial year.
2. The criteria for categorization of stations have now been revised to include footfalls at the station. The stations have been clubbed into three groups -- Non-suburban (NS), Suburban (S) and Halt (H). These groups have further been put in grades ranging from NSG 1-6, SG 1-3 and HG 1-3, respectively.

== Electrification & track doubling ==
The section is fully electrified. Track doubling work is in progress and expected to finished in 2022.

== Rail Traffic ==
Around 25 trains running through this line including super-fast, express and passenger services. More trains are expected to be introduced along the route with the completion of track doubling.
