= Viranialur railway station =

Railway station in Tamil Nadu, India

Viranialur

General information
- Location: Aloor, Nagercoil, Kanyakumari district, Tamil Nadu; India
- Coordinates: 8.1942°N 77.3683°E
- Elevation: 26 metres (85 ft)
- System: Light rail station
- Line: Thiruvananthapuram–Nagercoil–Kanyakumari line
- Platforms: 1
- Tracks: 1
- Connections: No

Construction
- Structure type: Standard
- Parking: Not available
- Accessible: Disabled access

Other information
- Status: Functioning
- Station code: VRLR
- Zone(s): Southern Railway zone
- Division(s): Thiruvananthapuram

History
- Opened: April 15, 1979; 47 years ago
Location
- Location within Tamil Nadu Location within India

Viranialur (Aloor) (Station code: VRLR) is a railway station located on the Thiruvananthapuram–Kanyakumari railway route. The station has one platform and falls in the Thiruvananthapuram division of the Southern Railway zone. All passenger trains passing through the station halt at the station. It is fairly remote.

== Suburban stations ==
Station name	Station code
Nagercoil Junction	NCJ
Nagercoil Town	NJT
Kanniyakumari	CAPE
Kulitthurai	KZT
Kulitthurai West	KZTW
Eraniel	ERL
Aralvaymozhi	AAY
Palliyadi	PYD
Viranialur	VRLR
Suchindram	SUCH
Tovalai	THX
