= Mondaicaud Amman Temple =

Temple in India

Mandaikadu Bhagavathi Amman Temple
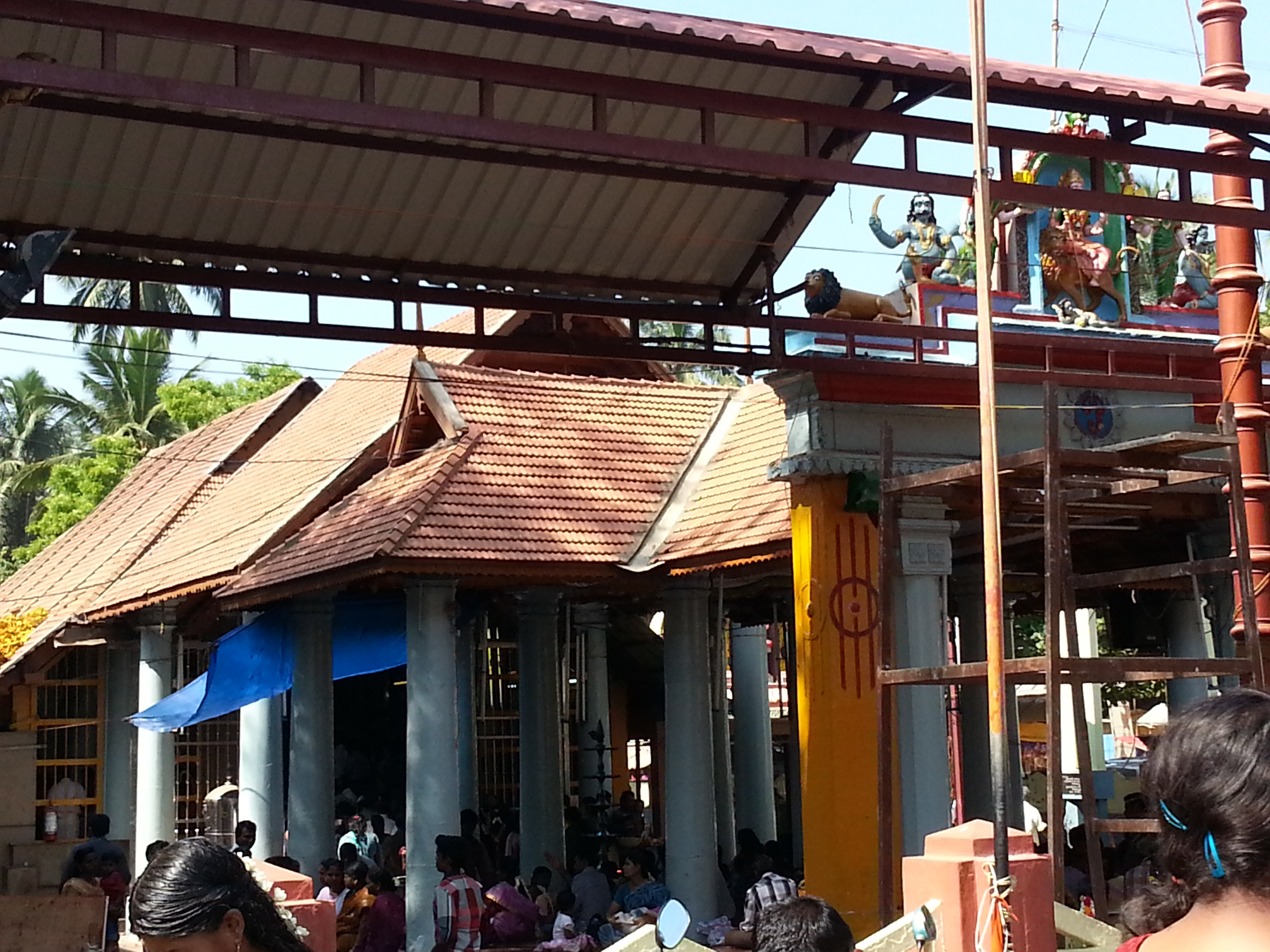
- Mandaikadu Bhagavathi Amman Temple, Kanyakumari district, Tamil Nadu

- Mandaikadu Bhagavathi Amman Temple, Kanyakumari district, Tamil Nadu

Religion
- Affiliation: Hinduism
- District: Kanyakumari
- Deity: Bhagavati
- Festival: Maasi Kodai

Location
- Location: Mandaikadu
- State: Tamil Nadu
- Country: India
- Coordinates: 8.1633°N 77.2799°E

Architecture
- Type: Dravidian architecture
- Completed

Specifications
- Temple: One
- Elevation: 39.68 m (130 ft)

Mandaikadu Bhagavathy Amman Temple is a Hindu temple where Adi Parashakti is the prime deity. This temple is also called 'Women's Sabarimala'. It is near Colachel in the west coast of Kanniyakumari district, Tamil Nadu.
