= Eraniel =

- Town
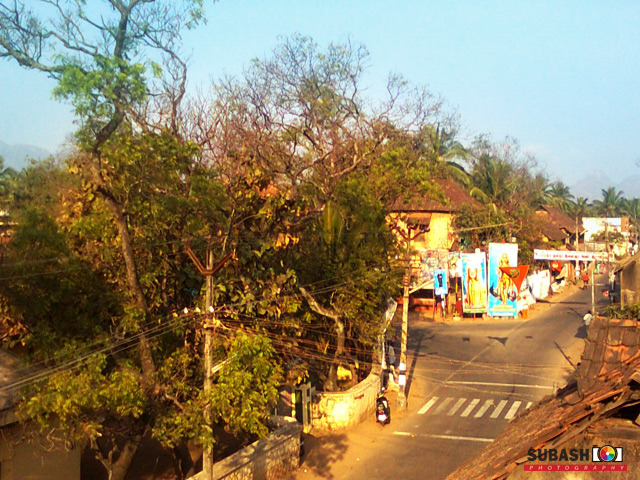
- Eraniel Junction

- Location in Tamil Nadu, India
- Coordinates: 8.2°N 77.3°E
- Country: India
- State: Tamil Nadu
- District: Kanyakumari
- Elevation: 10 m (33 ft)

Population (2001)
  - Total: 9,554

Languages
  - Official: Tamil
- Time zone: UTC+5:30 (IST)
- Postal code: 629802
- Vehicle registration: TN 74, TN 75
- Website: www.eraniel.com

Eraniel is a panchayat town in Kanyakumari district in the state of Tamil Nadu, India. It is of major commercial and political importance in the history of South India, as it was the seasonal capital of the affluent Venad and later Travancore kingdoms until the seventeenth century, when Padmanabhapuram and Thiruvananthapuram rose to prominence. Currently, it is known for its archaeological importance for the ruins of the dilapidated Eraniel Palace.

== Geography ==
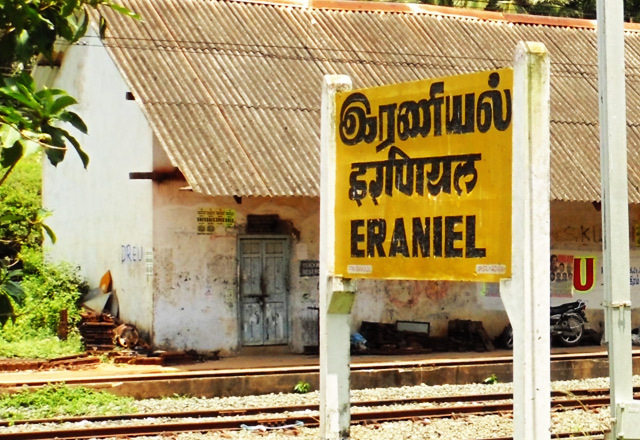
Eraniel railway station

Eraniel is located at 8.2°N 77.3°E. It has an average elevation of 10 meters (32 feet). It is near to Thuckalay. Eraniel's ancient name is Eranyasinga nalloor.

Eraniel is a small settlement which sprawls over an area of around 3 km^{2}. It is bounded in the north by Thalakkulam and in the east by Villukuri. Eraniel is around 72 km from Thiruvananthapuram and 7 km from Colachel Port. Kanyakumari, the southernmost tip of India, is nearly 32 km from the town. Nearby tourist destinations include Padmanabhapuram Palace (was the capital of Travancore). In 1745, the capital was shifted from Padmanabhapuram to Thiruvananthapuram.

The nearest airport is Thiruvananthapuram International Airport, 72 km away. The Eraniel railway station serves the town. Eraniel can be approached by road from Nagercoil, Muttam and Colachel.

== Eraniel Palace ==
Eraniel has a small palace located near Eraniel Gramam. The palace compound, which spreads over slightly more than three and a half acres, now consists of three identifiable parts—the Padippura or the majestic entranceway (now in total ruins); the main palace, also known as Kuthiramalika; and the Vasanthamandapam (spring pavilion). .

== Demographics ==
As of 2010 India census, Eraniel had a population of 9844. Males constitute 50% of the population and females 50%. Eraniel has an average literacy rate of 82%, higher than the national average of 59.5%: male literacy is 84%, and female literacy is 80%. In Eraniel, 9% of the population is under 6 years of age.

== Education ==
Government Higher Secondary School Eraniel (English Medium)
Government High School for Girls Eraniel(English Medium)
Government Middle School(Kotayakam)(English Medium)
Government Middle School(Eraniel Jn)(English Medium)
Government Higher Secondary School Kannatuvilai
Uma Matriculation Higher Secondary School, Alwarcoil & Madavilagam (English Medium)
Mothers Kidbee Preschool, Malkarai-Eraniel, Monday Market, Thucklay,Nagercoil, Kanyakumari (English Medium)

== Transportation ==
All buses from Thingalnagar bus stand will pass through Eraniel. Many buses run from Nagercoil via Eraniel. There are also buses to Chennai from Eraniel.

Eraniel railway station (ERL) (comes under Trivandrum Railway Division). Trains include Ananthapuri Express, Island Express, Guruvayur-Chennai Mail, Kanyakumari to Mumbai CST Express. Daily local trains from Nagercoil to Trivandrum also stops at Eraniel. A computerized railway reservation counter has now started in Eraniel Railway Station. Passengers can book railway tickets for any route from this station.

== Hospital ==
- Chithambara Kuttalam Pillai Clinic (Dr. Chithambara Kuttalam, Dr. Biju, Dr. Subin) Child Specialist, ENT, Palace road, Eraniel.
- Rathi Hospital (Dr. Rathi Murugan), Kathadimoodu Jn Eraniel
- B.N.Clinic [Dr.Kollappan]
- A M Hospital(Dr.Usha Hospital), Eraniel
- Dr. Arumugam Neuro Hospital, Thalakulam(2 km from Eraniel)
- CSI Mission Hospital, Neyyoor

== Economy ==
Following banks have their branches serving the village.

- State Bank of India, Thingalnagar (1 km from Eraniel, Stop: Eraniel Court)
- Indian Overseas Bank, Eraniel (Near SBI)
- HDFC Bank, Thukalay (at Court Junction)
- Syndicate Bank, Thingalnagar (Opp to Thingalnagar Bus stand)
- Tamil Nadu Mercantile Bank, Thingalnagar (Near SBI)
- Indian Bank, Eraniel (Kandanvillai)
- Kaniyakumari District Co-operative Bank, Thalakulam(Near Junction)
- Federal Bank, Eraniel

== Government offices ==
- Magistrate Court / Civil Court (Stop: Eraniel Court)
- Police Station / Women Police Station (Opp to Eraniel Court)
- Sub-Register Office (Next to Court, Eraniel)
- Telephone Exchange (BSNL)
- Electricity Board (TNEB, Eraniel) (1 km from Eraniel)
- Post Office 629802 (Near Eraniel Court bus stop on Nagercoil road)

== Nearest Places ==
- Eraniel railway station
- Padmanabhapuram
- Colachel
- Muttom
- Thuckalay
- Thingalnagar
- Neyyoor
- Mandaikadu
