= Mandaikadu =

- Town
- Location in Tamil Nadu, India
- Coordinates: 8°13′59″N 77°19′33″E
- Country: India
- State: Tamil Nadu
- District: Kanniyakumari

Population (2001)
  - Total: 12,349

Languages
  - Official: Tamil
- Time zone: UTC+5:30 (IST)

Mandaikadu is a coastal panchayat town in Kanniyakumari district in the Indian state of Tamil Nadu.

The town is known for its ten day long annual Koda festival that attracts hundreds of devotees.

The Mondaicaud Amman Temple is located in Mandaikadu.
