= Thiruvananthapuram–Nagercoil–Kanyakumari line =

Indian railway line

Thiruvananthapuram–Kanyakumari line
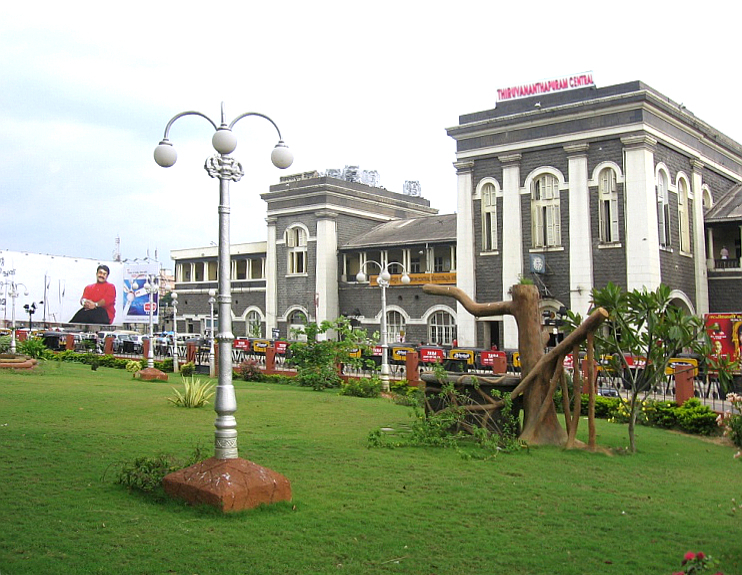
- Thiruvananthapuram Central Station main building

Overview
- Status: Operational
- Owner: Southern Railway zone
- Locale: Kerala; Tamilnadu
- Termini: Thiruvananthapuram Central (TVC); Kanyakumari (CAPE)
- Stations: 16
- Website: Southern Railway

Service
- Type: Regional rail Light rail
- System: Electrified
- Services: 1
- Operator: Thiruvananthapuram
- Rolling stock: WAP-1, WAP-4 electric locos; WDS-6, WDM-2, WDM-3A, WDP-4 and WDG-3A, WDG-4

History
- Opened: 1979; 47 years ago
- Electrification: 2012

Technical
- Line length: 86 kilometres (53 mi)
- Num of tracks: 2
- Track gauge: 1,676 mm (5 ft 6 in)
- Loading gauge: 4,725 mm × 3,660 mm (15 ft 6.0 in × 12 ft 0.1 in) (BG)
- Electrification: Overhead catenary
- Operating speed: 100 kilometres per hour (62 mph) (between Thiruvananthapuram Central and Nagercoil Junction); 90 kilometres per hour (56 mph) (between Nagercoil Junction and Kanyakumari)

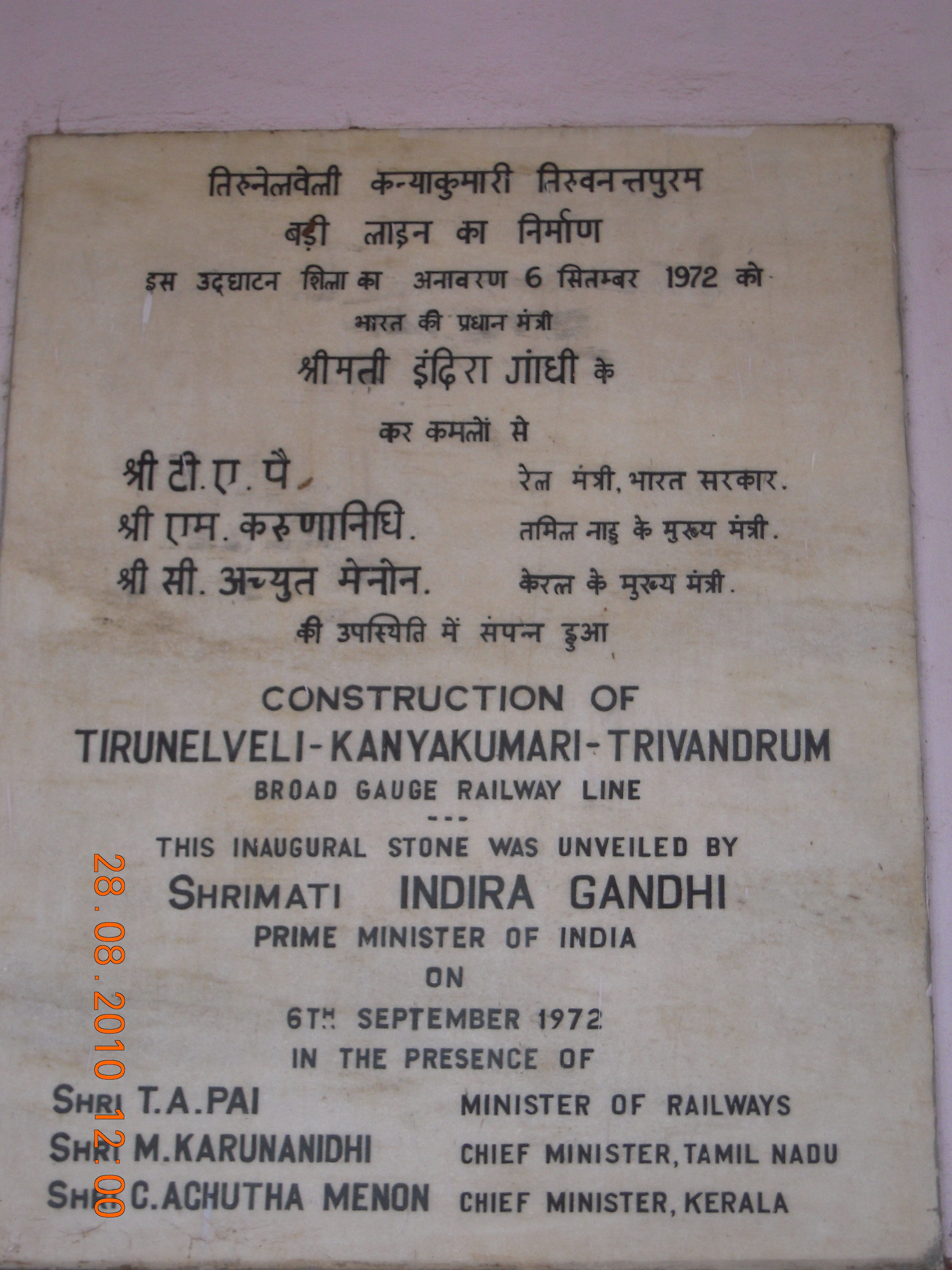
Foundation Stone

The Thiruvananthapuram–Nagercoil–Kanyakumari line or Kanniyakumari District Railway is a line in the Southern Railway zone of Indian Railways. It connects the cities Thiruvananthapuram and Nagercoil, continuing to Kanyakumari in the state of Tamil Nadu. The railway opened on 15 April 1979. This is the southernmost section of Indian Railways. The terminus of the line is at Kanyakumari railway station.

== History ==
The Madras government of the South Indian Railway wanted to extend their rail links into Travancore (Thiruvithamkoor) for commercial interests of both the states, during 1873. The Chief Engineer of Travancore, Mr. Barton, suggested a proposal to link Travancore by a railway line drawn from Kovilpatti of Madras state to Thiruvananthapuram through Shencottah in the Chittar mountain area, and from Thiruvananthapuram to Quilon (since renamed Kollam), the commercial centre of Kerala.

Although the "South Indian Railway Company were inclined to make a survey of the southern route via the Aramboly pass to Thiruvananthapuram, the balance of opinion was in favour of the Northern route, [so] they obtained permission to survey that as well". The Dewan of Travancore, Mr. Ramiengar, "suggested that a line from Kovilpatti to Quilon through Shencottah would be the one most advantageous."

About the close of 1881, the Consulting Engineer for Railways ordered a trial survey of the line from Tirunelveli to Thiruvananthapuram via Shenkottai, Aryankavu and Quilon. Immediately the Chief Engineer of S.I.R took up the survey of both the Southern and Northern routes to Thiruvananthapuram. In 1882, he submitted the report wherein he discussed the merits and demerits of both the routes. He held that the southern route would be cheaper and more beneficial than the northern one. But Dewan Ramiengar was strongly in favour of the northern route which would better promote its commercial interests of the country since Thiruvananthapuram was no more important commercially than Quilon.

So the northern route was approved by the S.I.R. authorities and work started to link Tirunelveli Quilon via Tenkasi, Shencottah and Aryankavu. In 1913, the Secretary of State for India sanctioned the extension of railway line from Quilon to Thiruvananthapuram beach (present Pettai Station) and it was opened for traffic on 1 January 1918. In 1926, the extension of this line from Thiruvananthapuram Beach to the heart of the city, that is Thampanoor (the present-day Thiruvananthapuram Central), was completed in 1931. Hence the rail link ended at Thiruvananthapuram. At that point, when the work of extension of the railway line from Quilon to Thiruvananthapuram was taken up, there was no proposal or plan to extend it to Nagercoil.

== Travancore government objected ==
In 1925, a survey was undertaken between Palamcottah and Punnagudi and the Travancore Government objected to taking it up to Nagercoil. The survey disclosed that the line would cost Rs. 22 lakhs.

Section	Date of Opening	Length in miles	Owner/section
Tirunelveli-Kallidaikurichi	1 June 1902	19.13	British Section
Kallidaikurichi-Near Shengottah	1 August 1903	31.28	British Section
Quilon-Punalur	1 June 1904	28.28	Travancore Section
Punalur-Near Shengottah	26 November 1904	29.77	Travancore Section
Quilon-Thiruvananthapuram	1 January 1918	37–91	Travancore Section

Nobody requested or represented to the Maharaja or Dewan in this respect. But, in 1928, a request was made to extend the rail link up to Nageroil. The very first man from South Travancore who made a claim at the Sree Moolam popular Assembly (headed by the Dewan of Travancore) to extend the Railway line up to Nagercoil was a Tamilian by name Mr. D. Francis of Ramanpudur on 1 March 1928 who was nominated as a member to the Sree Moolam popular Assembly by the Maharaja himself. The then Dewan Mr. Rajagopala Chariyar replied negatively, expressing the state’s inability to comply with his request,

as the Govt. have vested their attention to implement the Chakkai – Trivandrum Rail link, through Nagercoil extension was Surveyed and found feasible.

Once again, the Tamil people of South Travancore were refused their request. The estimated cost for the line from Trivandrum to Nagercoil via Colachel for a distance of 57.91 miles is Rs. 80,52,303. The cost of the line without the Colachel detour, for a distance of 46 miles up to Kottar, is Rs. 64,00,000.

=== Project in Parliament ===
- 11-12-1952 Shri Abdul Razak
- 21-02-1953 Shri Abdul Razak
- 03-03-1953 Shri Tangmani
- 23-09-1958 Shri P. Thanulinga Nadar

=== Survey and construction ===
In 1955, a survey for the railway line was sanctioned. It was completed in 1965, and construction began on 6 September 1972 with the foundation stone for Kanyakumari Railway station being laid by the Prime Minister Indira Gandhi on 6 April 1972. On 15 April 1979, the line began to operate; the railway line (consisting of 71.05 km of tracks from Thiruvananthapuram to Nagercoil) and Kanyakumari railway station were officially opened on 15 April 1979 by Indira Gandhi's successor Prime Minister Morarji Desai.

The foundation stone for Kanyakumari Railway station was laid on 6 April 1972 by the Prime Minister Indira Gandhi. Sri.K.Kamaraj, the sitting Member of Parliament, was not invited for the laying of foundation stone as he had split with Indira Gandhi in 1969 and formed the INC(O) and captured his seat.

However, as the function was performed in his constituency, he made it a point of attending and sat in the first row provided for the public. On seeing him, Indira Gandhi invited him to the dais. Seven years later, the railway line and the Kanyakumari railway station was inaugurated Prime Minister Morarji Desai on 15 April 1979.

The Thiruvananthapuram-Nagercoil-Kanyakumari railway line is fully electrified. Track doubling work is in progress and is expected to finished in 2027.

=== Transfer Division ===
The Thiruvananthapuram-Nagercoil-Kanyakumari railway line was opened on 15 April 1979, and was then under Madurai Division. Thiruvananthapuram division was formed on 2 October 1979 carving out certain sections from Madurai division. The Meter Gauge sections of Madurai division were retained, while all the newly-laid Broad Gauge Sections of Madurai Division were transferred to Thiruvananthapuram Division. Thus, the Thiruvananthapuram-Nagercoil-Kanyakumari BG line, and the under-construction Tirunelveli-Nagercoil BG line were transferred to Thiruvananthapuram Division.

It was then mentioned that when the Nagercoil-Tirunelveli line is completed, the sections falling under Kanyakumari district and Thirunelveli District would be transferred back to Madurai Division. The Nagercoil-Tirunelveli line was converted into BG line on 8 April 1981 and ever since people from South Tamil Nadu have been demanding the merger of Kanyakumari BG line with Madurai Division.

=== Route ===
- 1979 Thiruvananthapuram-Nagercoil-71.05 km opened on 16 April 1979
- 1979 Nagercoil -Kanniyakumari-15.51 km opened on 16 April 1979
- 1979 Thiruvananthapuram division of SR created on 2 October 1979
- 1981 Nagercoil-Tirunelveli-73.29 km opened on 2 April 1981
- 1986 Tirunelveli- Milavittan (Tuticorin) parallel new BG line51 km opened May 1986
- 1988 July 8 Bangalore-Thiruvananthapuram Island Express derails and plunges into Ashtamudi lake near Kollam, Kerala, killing 107. It is said that a freak tornado was the cause.
- 1993 Dindigul-Madurai Parallel B.G-64.32 km OPENED ON 14 April 1993
- 1993 Madurai-Virudunagar BG 40 km opened in June 1993
- 1993 Virudunagar-Maniyachchi 27 km opened on 21 October 1993
- 1993 Milavittan-Tuticorin −7.00 km opened on 21 October 1993
- 1995 May 14: 52 killed as Madras-Kanyakumari Exp. collides with goods train near Salem.
- 1999 Tiruchchirappalli-dindigul-93.00 km opened on 6 January 1999
- 2009 Dindigul-Madurai 65.35 km second BG line (earlier MG alignment) opened for traffic on 31 July 2009
- 2012 Thiruvananthapuram-Nagercoil-Kanyakumari electrified line opened for passenger traffic.
- 2013 Nagercoil Tirunelveli electrified line commissioned (with goods traffic)

=== Trains ===
==== Kumari Ananthan ====
- 1979 Nagercoil – Thiruvananthapuram daily passenger
- 1979 Nagercoil – Thiruvananthapuram daily passenger
- 1981 Nagercoil – Tirunelveli daily passenger

==== N. Dennis ====
- 1984 Thiruvananthapuram -Mumbai C.S.T Express extended to Kanniyakumari Daily
- 1985 Quilon – Nagercoil passenger train to Madurai
- 1988 Kanniyakumari- Jammu Tawi Himsagar (Wkly) 6317/6318
- 1988 Initially Island Express was running from Bangalore-to Kochi.- Subsequently, extended to Thiruvananthapuram. This train was extended- to Nagercoil from 1 November 1988 and to Kanniyakumari from 1 July 1992.
- 1992 Bangalore – Nagercoil Island Express to Kanyakumari
- 1992 Extension of Gandhidham – Thiruvananthapuram weekly express to Nagercoil
- 21.10.1993 Madras Central – Kanyakumari Exp
- 1994 Nagercoil – Guruvayur Exp [The now Chennai-Guruvayur express 6127/6128]
- 1995 Nagercoil – Bombay Exp (weekly) 6340/39
- 1996 Nagercoil-Mumbai CST Express from weekly to tri-weekly.
- 1998 Mumbai-Nagercoil Express 6339/6340 from 3 days to 4 days a week
- 1998 Nagercoil-Gandhidham Express (weekly)6335/6336 diverted via the Konkan Railway

==== Pon Radhakrishnan ====
- 1999 Nagercoil - Madurai daily passenger extend upto Coimbatore
- 2000 Tirupati-Nagercoil Express (Bi-weekly) [Later operated as Nagercoil-Tirupati-Mumbai biweekly express]
- 2000 Howrah-Trichy Express extended to Kanniyakumari (on one day in a week)
- 2001 Howrah-Thiruvananthapuram-Nagercoil Gurudev Weekly express [Now operating as Shalimar-Nagercoil Gurudev express]
- 14 October 2002 H. Nizamuddin - Kanyakumari Exp Tirukkural weekly via Villupuram
- 2002 Chennai - Thiruvananthapuram Exp 6123/6124 Ananthapuri (via Nagercoil) 6 days

==== A. V. Bellarmin ====
- 2004 Nagercoil - Chennai Central weekly
- 2005 ChennaiEgmore – Thiruvananthapuram Ananthapuri Express from 6 days a week to daily
- 9 November 2006 Chennai Egmore-Nagercoil weekly Express
- 1 February 2008 Coimbatore-Nagercoil Express via Madurai (2007) (Daily)
- 2007 Kottayam-Thiruvananthapuram Passenger extended up to Nagercoil

==== Helen Davidson ====
- 22 December 2010(2009) Bilaspur – Tirunelveli Jn. Weekly Superfast
- 30 March 2010(2009) Hapa – Tirunelveli Jn. Superfast (Bi-weekly) via Thiruvananthapuram (2010)
- 22-12-20102009) Kanyakumari – Rameshwaram Express (Tri-weekly) via Madurai (2009)
- 4 January 2010(2010) Mangalore – Kochuveli Ernad 6605/6606 (Tri-weekly) express to Nagercoil
- 19 December 2010(2010) Mangalore- Nagercoil Ernad Express 6605/6606from 3 days to daily
- 22 December 2011(2011) Nagercoil - Bangalore Express (Weekly) via Madurai-Dharmapuri-Hosur (2010)
- 19 November 2011(2011) Dibrugarh- Thiruvananthapuram-Kanniyakumari Express (weekly) via Kokrajhar
- 1 December 2012(2011) Kollam – Nagercoil MEMU Service
- 16 July 2012(2012) Thiruvananthapuram – Mangalore Parasuram Express to Nagercoil
- 12 April 2013(2012) Kanyakumari – Nizamuddin Weekly to biweekly
- 16 July 2013(2013) Kanyakumari – Puduchery Weekly (2013)
- 10 February 2014(2013) Nagercoil – Bangalore Daily Via. Madurai
- 28 July 2013(2013) Kollam - Nagercoil Memu train to Kanyakumari
- 7 September 2013(2013) Nagercoil - Kanyakumari passenger train 6 days to 7 days
- 7 September 2013(2013) Kanyakumari – Tirunelveli passenger train 6 days to 7 days
- 20 May 2014(2014) Nagercoil – Kacheguda 16353/16354 weekly express
- 1 September 2014(2014) Kanyakumari-Punalur passenger

==== Pon Radhakrishnan ====
- 15 July 2017 Tirunelveli – Tiruchirappalli SF InterCity Express extension up to Thiruvananthapuram
- 5 July 2018, 19423/19424 Tirunelveli – Gandhidham Humsafar weekly Express
- 5 March 2019 16191/16192 Tambaram – Tirunelveli – Tambaram Antyodaya Express to Nagercoil
- 8 March 2019 22657/22658 Tambaram – Nagercoil Tri weekly express

==== Vijay Vasanth ====
- 17 December 2023 16367/16368 Kanyakumari – Banaras Kasi Tamil Sangam Weekly Express.

== Stations ==
There are 16 railway stations along the line. The major stations are Nagercoil Junction, Nagercoil Town, Eraniel, Kulitturai, Parassala, Neyyattinkara. Thiruvananthapuram_South_(Nemom), the second satellite passenger terminal to the proposed Thiruvananthapuram Central, also comes under this section.

The train line has seen financial gain, and its earnings are shown below. Stations in bold letters generated a minimum of 2 crore.

Sl. No	Station Name	Category (Note: Station grouping has been separated into three categories. Non-suburban (NS), Suburban (S), and Halt (H). These groups have further been put in grades ranging from NSG 1-6, SG 1-3 and HG 1-3, respectively.) (based on 2011-12 earnings)	Earnings during 2016–17	Total no. of passengers booked during 2016–17	Passengers per day	Daily avg. earnings during 2016–17
1	Thiruvananthapuram Central (TVC)	NSG 2/ A1	184,48,16,371	1,43,63,426	39,352	50,54,291
2	Thiruvananthapuram_South_(Nemom) (NEM)	NSG 6/E	4,59,865	64,823	178	1,260
3	Balaramapuram (BRAM)	NSG 6/E	12,29,900	1,89,367	519	3,370
4	Neyyattinkara (NYY)	NSG 5/D	2,00,04,580	18,14,997	4,973	54,807
5	Amaravila Halt (AMVA)	HG 2/F	7,24,075	1,24,130	340	1,984
6	Dhanuvachapuram (DAVM)	HG 2/F	20,80,930	3,85,654	1,057	5,701
7	Parassala (PASA)	NSG 5/E	1,76,22,854	11,82,863	3,241	48,282
8	Kuzhuthurai West (KZTW)	HG 2/F	22,18,990	2,57,362	705	6,079
9	Kuzhithurai(KZT)	NSG 5/B	6,13,04,832	13,37,257	3,664	1,67,958
10	Palliyadi (PYD)	HG 2/F	8,90,791	1,23,953	340	2,441
11	Eraniel (ERL)	NSG 5/D	2,21,49,696	5,26,474	1,442	60,684
12	Viranialur (VRLR)	HG 2/F	6,07,565	63,872	175	1,665
13	Nagercoil Town (NJT)	HG 1/F	1,48,65,233	1,31,912	361	40,727
14	Nagercoil Junction (NCJ)	NSG 3/A	46,43,32,656	23,80,085	6,521	12,72,144
15	Suchindram (SCH)					
16	Kanyakumari (CAPE)	NSG 4/A	8,37,80,622	6,95,368	1,905	5,03,509

== Rail traffic ==
Around 21 trains run on the line. More trains are expected to be introduced along the route with the completion of track doubling.

The operating speed of trains running between Thiruvananthapuram to Nagercoil ranges from 80 to 100 km per hour. Trains operating from Kanyakumari to Nagercoil run from 75 to 90 km per hour.
