= Nagercoil Junction railway station =

Railway station in Tamil Nadu

Coordinates: 8.174°N 77.444°E

Nagercoil Junction Nagerkovil Sandhippu
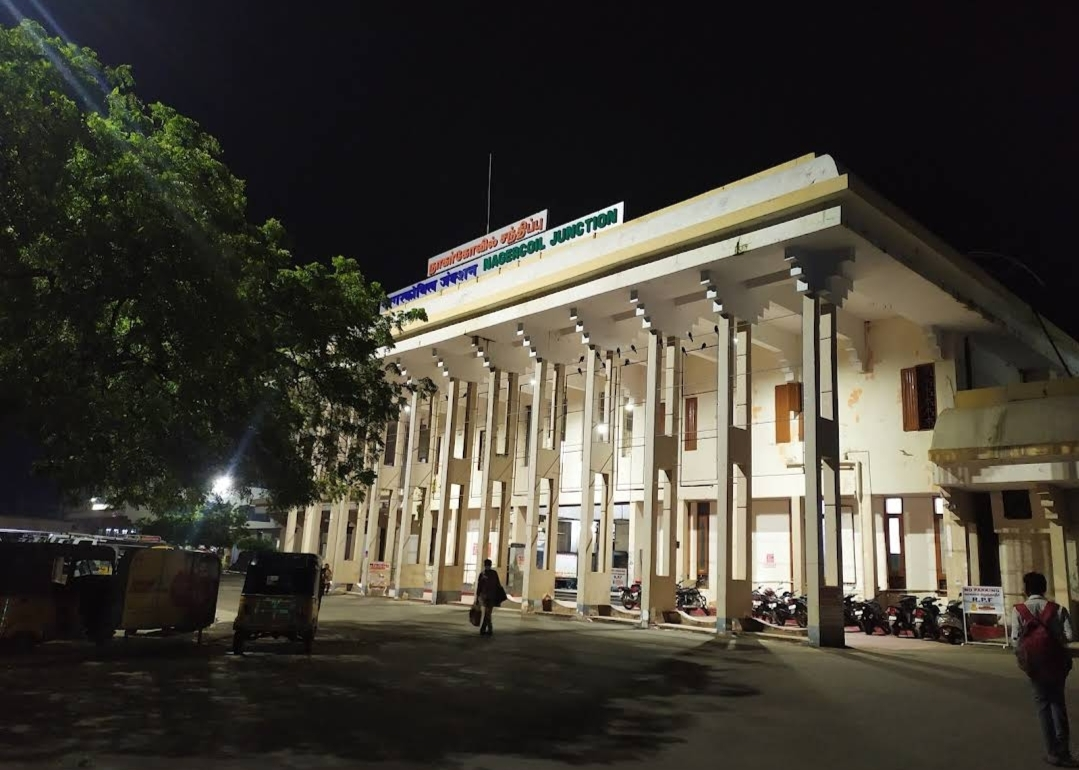
- Main building of the station

General information
- Location: Railway Feeder Rd, Kottar, Nagercoil. PIN – 629 002, Kanyakumari, Tamil Nadu; India
- Elevation: 38 metres (125 ft)
- System: Indian Railways station
- Owner: Ministry of Railways (India)
- Operator: Indian Railways
- Lines: Thiruvananthapuram–Nagercoil–Kanyakumari line; Nagercoil–Tirunelveli line
- Platforms: 4
- Tracks: 12
- Connections: Auto, Taxi stand, Bus stand

Construction
- Structure type: At–grade
- Parking: Available
- Accessible: Disabled access

Other information
- Status: Functioning
- Station code: NCJ
- Zone(s): Southern Railway zone
- Division(s): Thiruvananthapuram

History
- Opened: 17 April 1979; 47 years ago
- Closed: -
- Rebuilt: -
- Electrified: 30 kV AC 50 Hz
- Former names: KANYAKUMARI JUNCTION

Passengers
- 2018–19: 8,318 per day ▲20.5% (NORMAL)
- Rank: 9 (in Tamil Nadu); 6 (in Trivandrum division)
Location

Nagercoil Junction railway station (station code: NCJ) is an NSG–3 category Indian railway station in Thiruvananthapuram railway division of Southern Railway zone. It is a railway junction in Kanyakumari district in the state of Tamil Nadu.

== Background ==
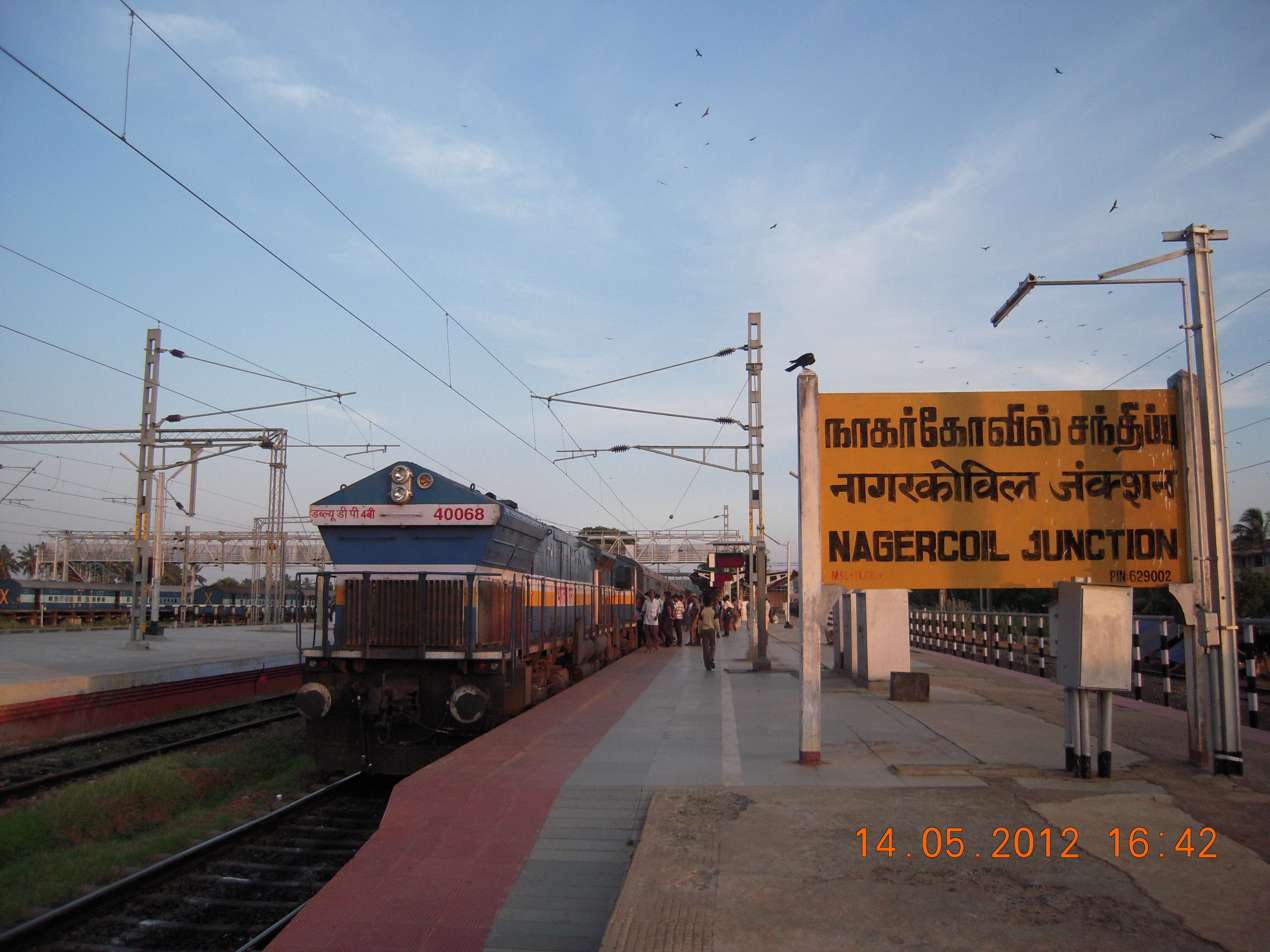
Kanykumari Express train at Railway station

Trivandrum–Nagercoil–Kanniyakumari and Tirunelveli–Nagercoil construction projects were inaugurated by the then Prime minister Mrs.Indira Gandhi on 6 September 1972. The Trivandrum–Nagercoil–Kanniyakumari line was opened on 15 April 1979. Nagercoil Junction became operational on 15 April 1979. The rail-link to Kanniyakumari was established only in 1979, mainly because establishing a rail line through the district posed some challenges for the rail department and took a lot of efforts, especially the western line. The western line runs through some huge artificial ground-elevations and a number of hill-tunnels. Kanyakumari district is connected through direct train services with all leading metropolitan cities in India like New Delhi, Mumbai, Chennai and Kolkata. The Chennai–Nagercoil sector is the largest profit making line in south India, which brought in ₹346 crore (US$37 million) in 2011. Most of the train services from this station were the extended services from nearest major cities such as Tirunelveli Junction and Thiruvananthapuram Central.

== Layout ==
The station has four platforms connecting the Kanyakumari–Trivandrum line (West Coast Line) of the Thiruvananthapuram railway division to the Chennai– Madurai–Nagercoil line

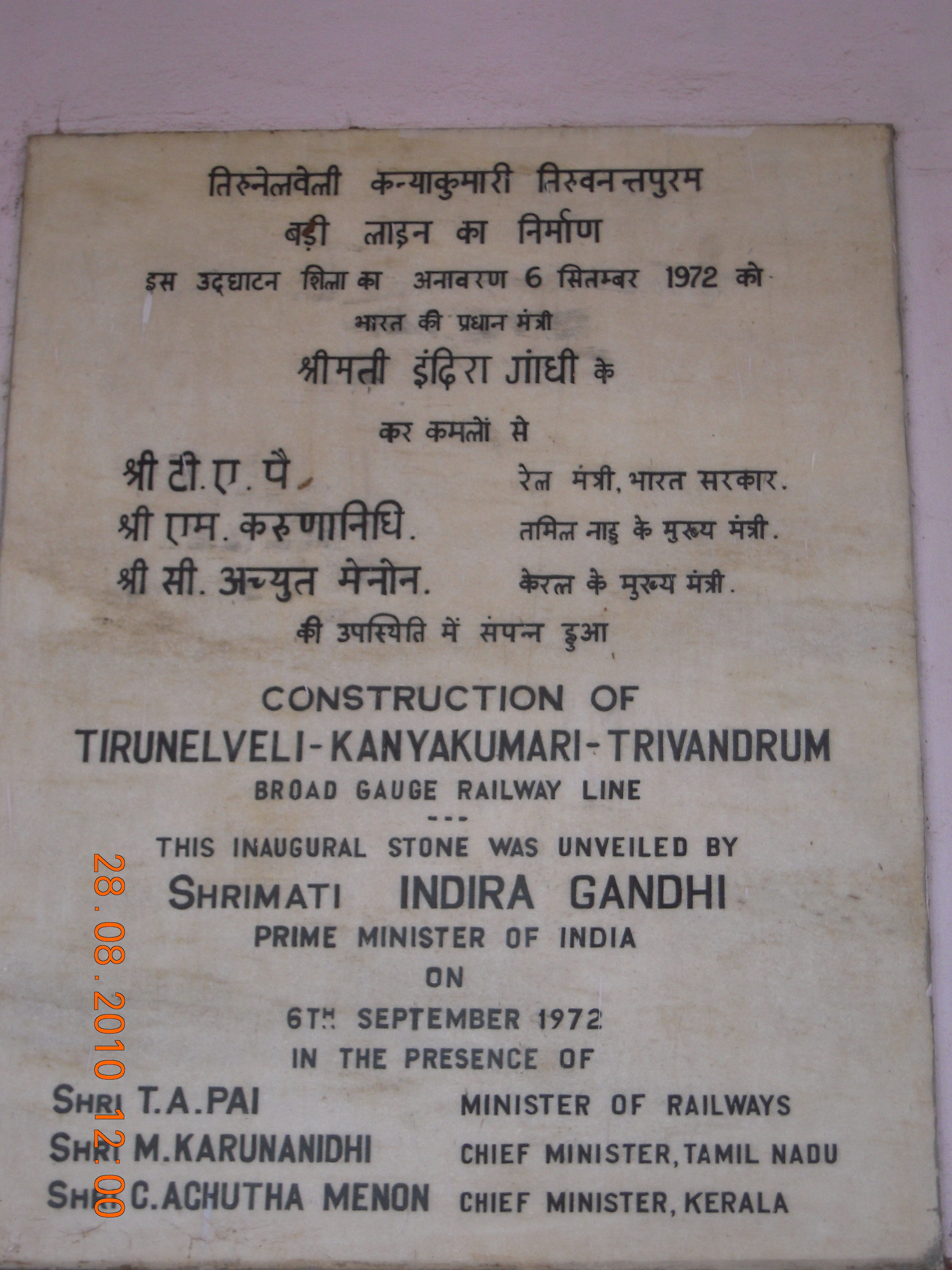
Foundation stone

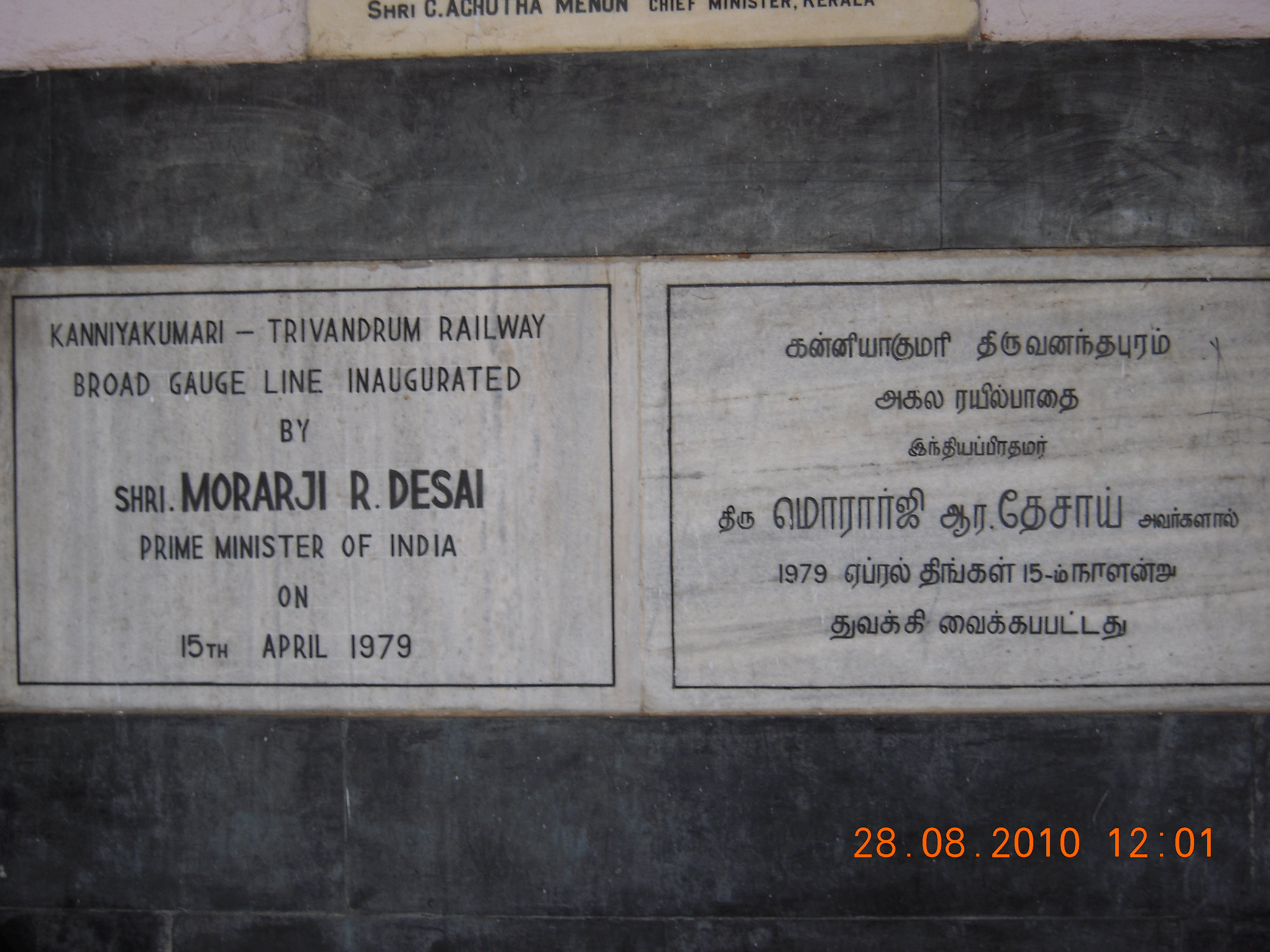
Placard of inaugural function

== Lines ==
- Fully Electrified double BG Line Towards Tirunelveli
- Fully Electrified Single BG Line Towards Tiruvananthapuram (Doubling are working in progress)
- Fully Electrified double BG Line Towards Kanniyakumari

== NAGERCOIL DEPOT ==
The Nagercoil Coaching Depot was started functioning on 01-04-1979 withdealing of one Pass Through passenger train NCJ-TVC-NCJ.The depot is holding 485 coaches which is the second largestcoaching depot of TVC division NCJ depot has been upgraded as ADME depot w.e.f05.04.2006.All trains maintained at NCJ depot are long distance trains including the longest train in India –“ VIVEK Express “ running from Dibrugarh and CAPE - No. 22503/22504 (SM) and the second longest train “ Train No. 16318/16317(PM) “ Himsagar Express running between CAPE and SVDK now running up to Shri Mata Vaishno Devi Katra from 04.09.2015. There are 4 platforms, 3 pit lines, 4 stabling lines and 2sick lines at the depot. One CNC Pit Wheel Lathe was commissioned on 07.07.2015.

Even though there are various wings in the Electrical Branch viz., Traction Distribution, Power, Train Lighting, AC Coach Maintenance, EMUDepots and AC Loco,this work study pertaining to Air condition (AC) and Non-AC Coaches/Train lighting (TL) Maintenance of Nagercoil (NCJ) Depot of TVC Division. The SSE/Elec/NCJ Depot is responsible for carrying out the scheduled Primary, Secondary maintenance and sick line attention of both AC and Non-AC coaches (TL) of Mail / Express and passenger trains holding in this depot besides the Manning of AC Coaches.

== Projects and development ==
It is one of the 75 stations in Tamil Nadu to be named for upgradation under Amrit Bharat Station Scheme of Indian Railways.

11.38 crore rupees have been allocated for the renovation work of Nagercoil railway station under the Amrit Bharat scheme.

== See also ==
- Thiruvananthapuram railway division
- Southern Railway zone
