= Nedumangad taluk =

Nedumangad Taluk
- Taluk
- Location in Kerala, India Nedumangad Taluk (India)
- Coordinates: 8°36′12″N 77°00′10″E
- Country: India
- State: Kerala
- District: Thiruvananthapuram
- Headquarters: Nedumangad

Government
  - Type: Sub district

Area
  - Total: 871.74 km^{2} (336.58 sq mi)

Population
  - Total: 645,326
  - Density: 740.27/km^{2} (1,917.3/sq mi)

Languages
  - Official: Malayalam, English
- Time zone: UTC+5:30 (IST)
- Vehicle registration: KL-21, KL-16

Nedumangad Taluk is a Taluk (tehsil) in Thiruvananthapuram district in the Indian state of Kerala. It situated in the eastern part of the Thiruvananthapuram district. It comprises 23 villages and one municipality.

It is bounded on the west by Trivandrum Taluk, on the east by the State of Tamil Nadu, on the south by Neyyattinkara Taluk and on the north by Kollam District.

== Settlements ==
There are 25 villages and one Municipality in this taluk.

== Villages ==
Anad, Aruvikkara, Aryanad, Kallara, Karakulam, Karippooru, Koliyakode, Kurupuzha, Manikkal, Nedumangad, Nellanad, Palode, Panavoor, Pangode, Peringamala, Pullampara, Theakada, Thennoor, Tholicode, Uzhamalackal, Vamanapuram, Vattappara, Vellanad, Vembayam, Vithura.

=== Municipalities ===
There is only one municipality, Nedumangad, which is also the headquarters of the taluk.
