= Thiruvananthapuram Outer Ring Road =

Ring road expressway around Thiruvananthapuram, India

Route information
- Length: 80 km (50 mi) Vizhinjam (Port of Trivandrum) - NH66 Navaikulam
- Existed: 2018–present

Major junctions
- Ring road around Trivandrum
- South end: Port of Trivandrum (Vizhinjam)
- Mangalapuram
- North end: Navaikulam

Location
- Country: India
- Primary destinations: Vizhinjam, Balaramapuram, Malayinkeezhu, Aruvikkara, Nedumangad, Thekkada, Ozhukupara, Vembayam, Mangalapuram, Navaikulam

Highway system
- Roads in India; Expressways; National; State; Asian

Thiruvananthapuram Outer Area Growth Corridor (OAGC) (also known as: Thiruvananthapuram Outer Ring Road) is a proposed 80 km (50 mi), four-lane ring road in Thiruvananthapuram, the capital city of Kerala, India. It is part of the Capital Region Development Programme-II (CRDP-II) in Thiruvananthapuram City which comes under the Centre's Bharatmala Pariyojana scheme. Central government officially notified the road as National Highway 866 (NH 866).

The road starts at National Highway 66 from Navaikulam and ends at Vizhinjam with a length of 65.630 km. There is also a link road connecting Thekadda to Mangalapuram at a length of 13.250 km. The road will be constructed as a 4-lane greenfield highway that is structurally designed and engineered to be expandable to 6 lanes in the future. The corridor will also have special economic development zones making it a hub for logistics, IT and entertainment. This includes logistics hub of 60 acres at North Mangalapuram and south Neeramankuzhy. Andoorkonam (48 acres) and Panthalacode (80 acres) are the economical and commercial zones. The proposed alignment is through Navaikulam, Kilimanoor, Thekkada, Ozhukupara,Vembayam, Mangalapuram, Pothencode, Nedumangad, Aruvikkara, Cheriyakonni, Chowalloor, Vilappilsala, Maranalloor, Ooruttambalam, Mudavoorpara, Chavadinada, Venganoor, Kalluvettankuzhi and Vizhinjam.
