= Nedumangad Assembly constituency =

Constituency of the Kerala legislative assembly in India

Nedumangad
- Constituency No. 130 for the Kerala Legislative Assembly
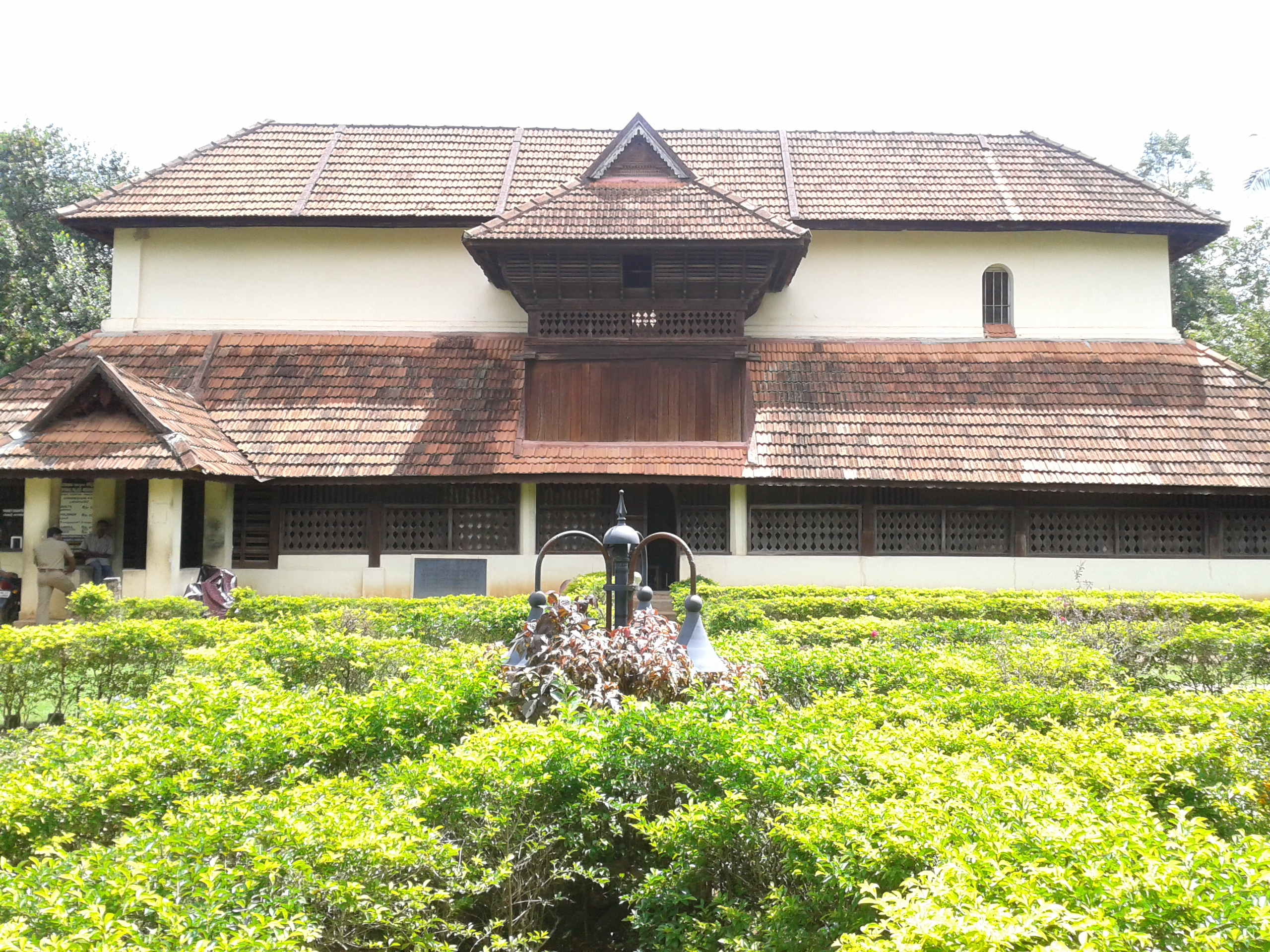
- Koyikkal Palace at Nedumangad

Constituency details
- Country: India
- Region: South India
- State: Kerala
- District: Thiruvananthapuram
- Lok Sabha constituency: Attingal
- Established: 1957
- Total electors: 2,04,198 (2016)
- Reservation: None

Member of Legislative Assembly
- 16th Kerala Legislative Assembly
- Incumbent G. R. Anil
- Party: CPI
- Alliance: LDF
- Elected year: 2026

Nedumangad is one of the 140 state legislative assembly constituencies in Kerala in southern India. It is also one of the seven state legislative assembly constituencies included in Attingal Lok Sabha constituency. As of the 2026 Assembly elections, the current MLA is G. R. Anil, the former minister for food and civil supplies, Government of Kerala of CPI.

== Local self-governed segments ==
Nedumangad Assembly constituency is composed of the following local self-governed segments:

Sl no.	Name	Status (Grama panchayat/Municipality)	Taluk
1	Nedumangad	Municipality	Nedumangad
2	Manikkal	Grama panchayat	Nedumangad
3	Karakulam	Grama panchayat	Nedumangad
4	Vembayam	Grama panchayat	Nedumangad
5	Andoorkonam	Grama panchayat	Thiruvananthapuram
6	Pothencode	Grama panchayat	Thiruvananthapuram

== Members of the Legislative Assembly ==
The following list contains all members of Kerala Legislative Assembly who have represented the constituency:

Election	Name	Party
1957	K. Neelakantaru Pandarathil	Communist Party of India
1960	K. Neelakantaru Pandarathil	Communist Party of India
1967	K. G. Kunjukrishna Pillai	Communist Party of India
1970	K. G. Kunjukrishna Pillai	Communist Party of India
1977	Kaniapuram Ramachandaran	Communist Party of India
1980	K. V. Surendranath	Communist Party of India
1982	K. V. Surendranath	Communist Party of India
1987	K. V. Surendranath	Communist Party of India
1991	Palode Ravi	Indian National Congress
1996	Palode Ravi	Indian National Congress
2001	Mankode Radhakrishnan	Communist Party of India
2006	Mankode Radhakrishnan	Communist Party of India
2011	Palode Ravi	Indian National Congress
2016	C. Divakaran	Communist Party of India
2021	G. R. Anil	Communist Party of India
2026	G. R. Anil	Communist Party of India

Percentage change (±%) denotes the change in the number of votes from the immediately previous election.

== Election results ==
=== 2026 ===
There were 1,98,906 registered voters in Nedumangad assembly constituency for the 2026 legislative assembly election.

}}

2026 Kerala Legislative Assembly election: Nedumangad
Party	Candidate	Votes	%	±%
CPI	G. R. Anil	69,206	43.55	▼3.99
INC	Meenankal Kumar	47,623	29.97	▼2.34
BJP	Yuvraj Gokul	38,999	24.54	▲6.98
SUCI(C)	Batherutheen A (Ziad Kandala)	1,191	0.75	−
NOTA	None of the above	979	0.62	▲0.02
BSP	Sujilal B G	408	0.26	▼0.11
Independent	Shibu G	171	0.11	−
Independent	Vembayam Yesudas	129	0.08	−
Independent	Anvar Sadath	95	0.06	−
Independent	Kumar	93	0.06	−
Margin of victory		21,583	13.58	▼1.65
Turnout		1,58,894	79.88	▲6.36
CPI hold		Swing	-	

=== 2021 ===
2021 Kerala Legislative Assembly election: Nedumangad
Party	Candidate	Votes	%	±%
CPI	G. R. Anil	72,742	47.54	▲9.38
INC	P. S. Prasanth	49,433	32.31	▼3.45
BJP	J. R. Padmakumar	26,861	17.56	▼5.66
SDPI	Irshad Kanyakulangara	1,884	1.23	▲0.54
BSP	Bipin Pallipuram	563	0.37	▼0.23
NOTA	None of the above	917	0.6	▲0.07
Margin of victory		23,309	15.23	▲12.83
Turnout		1,53,002	73.52	▼0.59
CPI hold		Swing		

=== 2016 ===
There were 2,04,198 registered voters in the constituency for the 2016 Kerala Assembly election.

2016 Kerala Legislative Assembly election: Nedumangad
Party	Candidate	Votes	%	±%
CPI	C. Divakaran	57,745	38.16	▼5.68
INC	Palode Ravi	54,124	35.76	▼12.11
BJP	V. V. Rajesh	35,139	23.22	▲18.44
SDPI	Abdul Salam A.	1,039	0.69	▼0.27
BSP	Bipin M. I.	910	0.60	▲0.01
NOTA	None of the above	807	0.53	
PDP	Andoorkonam Sulfi	503	0.33	
Independent	Shibu G.	318	0.21	
SS	Peringammala Aji	251	0.17	
Independent	Soman C.	217	0.14	
Independent	Divakaran Pani	143	0.09	
Independent	Pariyaram Raveendran	80	0.05	
Independent	Raveendran Nair	63	0.04	
Margin of victory		3,621	2.40	
Turnout		1,51,339	74.11	▲3.06
CPI gain from INC		Swing		

=== 2011 ===
There were 1,75,795 registered voters in the constituency for the 2011 election.

2011 Kerala Legislative Assembly election: Nedumangad
Party	Candidate	Votes	%	±%
INC	Palode Ravi	59,789	47.87	
CPI	P. Ramachandran Nair	54,759	43.84	
BJP	Anjana K. S.	5,971	4.78	
Independent	Andoorkonam Sulfi	1,255	1.00	
SDPI	Noorjahan A.	1,200	0.96	
BSP	Idamma N.	731	0.59	
Independent	Vazhode Ravi	346	0.28	
Independent	Biju A.	342	0.27	
Independent	Anand G. Ramachandran Nair	277	0.22	
Independent	Saji	237	0.19	
Margin of victory		5,030	4.03	
Turnout		1,24,907	71.05	
INC gain from CPI		Swing		

=== 2006 ===
2006 Kerala Legislative Assembly election: Nedumangad
Party	Candidate	Votes	%	±%
CPI	Mankode Radhakrishnan	58,674	47.80	
INC	Palode Ravi	58,589	47.73	
BJP	Paruthippally Sreekumar	2,970	2.41	
Margin of victory		85	0.07	
Turnout		1,22,735		
CPI hold		Swing		

=== 2001 ===
There were 1,82,135 registered voters in the constituency for the 2001 election.

2001 Kerala Legislative Assembly election: Nedumangad
Party	Candidate	Votes	%	±%
CPI	Mankode Radhakrishnan	62,270	47.84	
INC	Palode Ravi	62,114	47.72	
BJP	R Subramanian Potty	4,762	3.66	
Margin of victory		156	0.12	
Turnout		1,30,173	71.48	
CPI gain from INC		Swing		

=== 1996 ===
There were 1,64,525 registered voters in the constituency for the 1996 election.

1996 Kerala Legislative Assembly election: Nedumangad
Party	Candidate	Votes	%	±%
INC	Palode Ravi	57,220	49.32	
CPI	Mankode Radhakrishnan	52,956	45.64	
BJP	V Somasekharan Nair	3,960	3.41	
Margin of victory		4,264	3.68	
Turnout		1,16,020	71.83	
INC hold		Swing		

=== 1991 ===
There were 1,54,929 registered voters in the constituency for the 1991 election.

1991 Kerala Legislative Assembly election: Nedumangad
Party	Candidate	Votes	%	±%
INC	Palode Ravi	54,678	48.59	
CPI	K Govinda Pillai	53,739	47.75	
BJP	M Somasekharan Nair	3,873	3.44	
Margin of victory		939	0.84	
Turnout		1,12,537	73.65	
INC gain from CPI		Swing		

=== 1987 ===
There were 1,25,938 registered voters in the constituency for the 1987 election.

1987 Kerala Legislative Assembly election: Nedumangad
Party	Candidate	Votes	%	±%
CPI	K. V. Surendranath	47,914	48.36	
INC	Palode Ravi	42,371	42.76	
Independent	P Raghunathan	7,598	7.67	
Margin of victory		5,543	5.60	
Turnout		99,086	79.29	
CPI hold		Swing		

=== 1982 ===
There were 1,02,484 registered voters in the constituency for the 1982 election.

1982 Kerala Legislative Assembly election: Nedumangad
Party	Candidate	Votes	%	±%
CPI	K. V. Surendranath	37,350	51.73	
Independent	S. Varadarajan Nair	34,009	47.11	
Margin of victory		3,341	4.62	
Turnout		72,197	71.14	
CPI hold		Swing		

=== 1980 ===
There were 96,716 registered voters in the constituency for the 1980 election.

1980 Kerala Legislative Assembly election: Nedumangad
Party	Candidate	Votes	%	±%
CPI	K. V. Surendranath	33,919	52.24	
Independent	Purathekattu Chandrasekharan Nair	27,619	42.53	
Margin of victory		6,300	9.81	
Turnout		64,933	67.43	
CPI hold		Swing		

=== 1977 ===
There were 84,807 registered voters in the constituency for the 1977 election.

1977 Kerala Legislative Assembly election: Nedumangad
Party	Candidate	Votes	%	±%
CPI	Kaniapuram Ramachandran Nair	34,731	56.10	
Independent	R. Sundaresan Nair	23,992	38.75	
Margin of victory		10,739	17.35	
Turnout		61,914	76.79	
CPI hold		Swing		

== See also ==
- Nedumangad
- Thiruvananthapuram district
- List of constituencies of the Kerala Legislative Assembly
- 2016 Kerala Legislative Assembly election
