= Nedumangad (disambiguation) =

Nedumangad is a town and municipality in India.

Nedumangad may also refer to:

- Nedumangad (tehsil), headquartered in Nedumangad
- Nedumangad (State Assembly constituency) in India
- Nedumangad Sivanandan (born 1935), Indian carnatic violinist
- Anil Nedumangad (1972–2020), Indian film actor
