= Administration of Thiruvanathapuram district =

This District has four types of administrative hierarchies:

- Taluk and Village administration managed by the provincial government of Kerala
- Panchayath Administration managed by the local bodies
- Parliament Constituencies for the federal government of India
- Assembly Constituencies for the provincial government of Kerala

== Introduction ==
The state legislative assembly and Secretariat are located in Thiruvananthapuram. The city also serves as the headquarters of the Thiruvananthapuram district. The Thiruvananthapuram municipality was established in 1920 and was declared as a Corporation on 30 October 1940, during the rule of Chitra Thirunal Bala Rama Varma. The city is administered by the Thiruvananthapuram Corporation which headed by a mayor and is responsible for the overall supervision and control of the administrative functions. The city council is democratically elected and comprises 100 members representing various wards. The Corporation of Thiruvananthapuram was ranked second out of 21 cities on best governance and administrative practices in India in 2014.

Thiruvananthapuram City officials

| Mayor | V. K. Prasanth |
| Deputy Mayor | Rakhi Ravikumar |
| Corporation Secretary | Biju K IAS |
| Commissioner of Police | G. Sparjan Kumar IPS |

The city elects its member of Parliament for the Thiruvananthapuram Lok Sabha constituency. It contributes four members to the legislative assembly from Kazhakuttam, Vattiyoorkavu, Thiruvananthapuram and Nemom. The law and order is managed by Kerala police headed by a Police Commissioner, an officer of Deputy Inspector General rank in the Indian Police Service. The city is divided into three police sub-divisions headed by Assistant Commissioners. There are two traffic sub-divisions, a women's cell and a narcotics control cell.

Thiruvananthapuram Municipal Corporation തിരുവനന്തപുരം നഗരസഭ

Type
- Type: Municipal Corporation of the Thiruvananthapuram

Leadership
- Mayor: V.K. Prashant, Communist Party of India (Marxist)
- Deputy Mayor: Rakhi Ravikumar, Communist Party of India
- Leader Of Opposition: Girikumar, Bharatiya Janata Party

Structure
- Seats: 100
- Political groups: LDF (43); BJP (35); UDF (21); Independents (01)

Elections
- Last election: 2015

Website
- www.corporationoftrivandrum.in

== District Administration ==
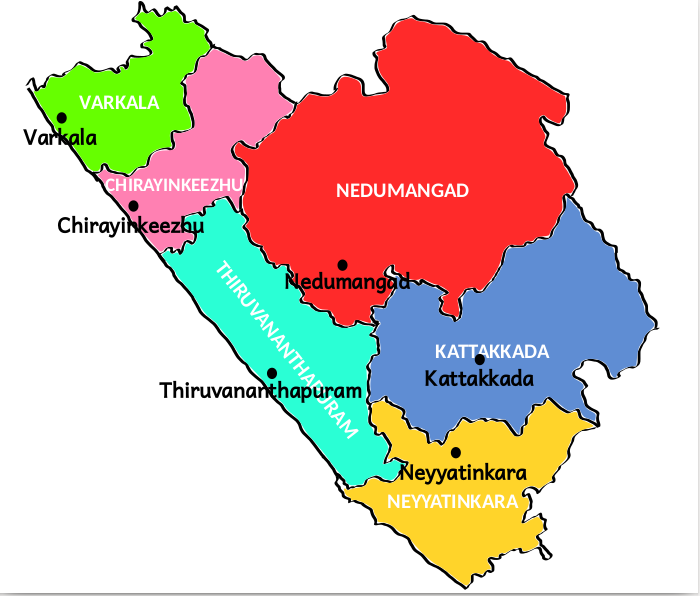
Taluks in Thiruvananthapuram district

The headquarters of the district administration is at Kudappanakunnu, Thiruvananthapuram. The district administration is headed by the District collector. He is assisted by five deputy collectors holding charges of general matters, land acquisition, revenue recovery, land reforms and election.

The District Collector also holds the charge of the District Magistrate and is assisted by the Additional District Magistrate (Deputy Collector, General) and the Revenue Divisional Officer. The district has two revenue division, Thiruvananthapuram and Nedumangad which is headed by the Revenue Divisional Officer (RDO). He is also the Sub-Divisional Magistrate.

There are six taluks: Neyyattinkara, Thiruvananthapuram, Nedumangad, Chirayinkeezhu, Varkala and Kattakkada, each headed by a Tahsildar.

There are 120 villages under the six taluks of the district. The names of the taluks, their headquarters and the Villages under them are given in the box above. Consequent to the 73rd amendment of the Constitution and the new Panchayat Raj-Nagarapalika Act, the Kerala Panchayat raj Act came into being on 23 April 1994. Thiruvananthapuram district has one district panchayat, 12 block panchayats and 78 grama panchayats.

The Thiruvananthapuram District Panchayat has already worked out some notable developmental schemes in the agricultural, water supply and educational sectors. The District Panchayat president is the chairman of the District Planning Committee and the District Rural Development Agency.

There are two parliamentary constituencies in the district. They are Attingal with constituency number 19, and Thiruvananthapuram, with constituency number 20.

| No | Municipality | Population |
|---|---|---|
| 1. | Neyyattinkara | 69467 |
| 2. | Nedumangad | 56138 |
| 3. | Varkala | 42273 |
| 4. | Attingal | 35648 |

| No | Name of Taluks | Headquarters | No. of Villages |
|---|---|---|---|
| 1. | Chirayinkeezhu | Attingal | 16 |
| 2. | Nedumangad | Nedumangad | 24 |
| 3. | Neyyattinkara | Neyyattinkara | 19 |
| 4. | Thiruvananthapuram | Thiruvananthapuram | 30 |
| 5. | Varkala | Varkala | 13 |
| 6. | Kattakkada | Kattakkada | 14 |

== Thiruvananthapuram city Administration ==
Thiruvananthapuram Municipal Corporation (Malayalam: തിരുവനന്തപുരം നഗരസഭ) is the largest city corporation in the state of Kerala in India by area and population. It is the Municipal Corporation that administrates the city of Thiruvananthapuram, the capital of Kerala. The city corporation is spread over 214.86 km^{2} with 100 wards and a population of 9,57,730 inhabitants.

The conservancy department was started in Thiruvananthapuram in 1877 during the reign of the king Ayilyam Thirunal. Following this, the town was divided into 5 divisions, namely Kottaykkakam, Chalai, Sreevaraham, Manacaud and Pettah.

The first president of the Committee was Dewan Peshkar Iraviperur Pillai. There were 19 members in the committee. The Thiruvananthapuram Municipality came into existence in 1920. After two decades, during the reign of Sree Chithira Thirunal, Thiruvananthapuram Municipality was converted into Corporation on 30 October 1940.

The city corporation is ruled by the council of 100 members, headed by the Mayor. The Mayor (elected from among the councilors) chairs the Council meetings, and is responsible for the overall, supervision and control of the administrative functions of the Municipal Corporation. The Council is composed of all elected councilors. The administration of the TMC vests in the Council. The term of office of the council is five years. The TMC through the Council has all the powers, authority and responsibilities of the Government, to enable it to function as an institution of self-government in respect of the matters entrusted to it. The Council, constitute Standing Committees for exercising its powers, discharging such duties or performing such functions, as is provided for in the Kerala Municipalities Act. The Deputy Mayor is the Chairman of the Finance Standing Committee and also presides over the Council meetings during the absence of the Mayor. The Secretary of the TMC is an officer appointed by the Government. The law and order of the city is handled by the City Police Commissioner. The total police strength in the city including the Armed Reserve camp at Nandavanam and the SAP camp at Peroorkada, is about 4,500.

The corporation was divided into 24 wards covering an area of 30.66 km^{2} in 1940. Through years, the city corporation has grown up to 100 wards, and now the Thiruvananthapuram Corporation Council is the second largest democratically elected body in Kerala after the Legislative Assembly
