= Vattappara =

- Town
- Location in Kerala, India Vattappara (India)
- Coordinates: 8.5933°N 76.9506°E
- Country: India
- State: Kerala
- District: Thiruvananthapuram
- Taluk: Nedumangadu

Population (2011)
  - Total: 27,140

Languages
  - Official: Malayalam, English
- Time zone: UTC+5:30 (IST)
- PIN: 695028
- Telephone code: 0472
- Vehicle registration: KL-21

Vattappara is a village in Thiruvananthapuram district in the state of Kerala, India. It is well known for its geographical peculiarities with quarries that are generally used for extracting building materials (rock).This town is by the side of MC Road connecting Trivandrum and Kottayam and 14 km away from Trivandrum City. The nearest township is Nedumangad.There is no recorded history on the origin of this place. The major occupation in Vattappara is farming (Rubber, Coconut).

== Demographics ==
As of 2011 India census, Vattappara had a population of 27140 with 13080 males and 14060 females.

Social Institutions

- Akshaya E Cetre, Kanacode, Vattappara
- SUT Academy of Medical Sciences, Vencode, Vattappara
- PMS College of Dental Science & Research, Golden Hills, Vattappara
- Lourdes Mount Higher Secondary School, Kanakkode, Vattappara
- Seventh Day Adventist English Medium School, Vattapara
- Little Flower LP school, Kazhunad kallayam vattappara
- LMA LPS Kanacode, Vattappara
- Government L.P School Kuttiyani
- Shalom Special School, Vattappara

== Religion ==
=== Temples ===
- Kuttiyani Sree Dharmma Sastha (Vana Sastha) Temple
- The Thiruchittapara Anjaneya Swamy Temple
- The Muchannoor Thampuran Sri Durga Devi Temple
- The Kodoor Sri Bhagavathi Temple
- The Panniyodu Panchami Devi Temple, Pallivila, Vattappara
- The Kuttiyani Sree Dharma Sasta Temple at Kuttiyani
- Mottamoodu Paalayamketti lord Siva temple
- Vettinad Ooroottumandapam Temple
- Sri Endalayappan Temple, Kazhunadu
- Sri Endalayappan Temple
- Sri Thampuran temple, Pallivila, Vattappara
- Ramaraserry Sree Bhadra Parameshwari Devi Temple, Vattappara

=== Churches ===
- St. Francis Xavier Latin Catholic Church
- CSI Church, Vattappara
- Seventh-Day Adventist Church
- Jehovah Jireh Prayer Assembly Church, Stephens tower Vattappara

=== Mosque ===
- Vattappara Jumua Masjid

== Transport ==
=== Road ===
The major portion of the road transportation is provided by KSRTC ( Kerala State Road Transport Corporation).There are frequent bus services through this route. There is no private bus service in this place.

== Police station ==
=== Vattappara Police Station ===
Vattappara Police Station. Ph: 9497980137

=== Rail ===
The nearest Railway Station is Trivandrum Central railway station which is 15 km from Vattappara.

=== Air ===
The nearest airport is Trivandrum International Airport which is 20 km from Vattappara.

== Geography ==
- North : Vembayam
- East : Nedumangad
- West : Pothencode
- South : Mannanthala

== Geographic Location ==
|Centre = Vattappara |North = Venjarammoodu |Northeast = Ponmudi |East = Nedumangad |Southeast = Aruvikkara |South = Trivandrum |Southwest = Kovalam |West = Pothencode |Northwest = Kazhakkuttam
