= Cheriya Konni =

Village in Kerala, India

Cheriyakonni is a small village in the suburbs of Thiruvananthapuram, Kerala, India. It is located 14 km from the Kerala Legislative Assembly and 15 km from the Kerala Government Secretariat. The Karamana River, which starts near the southern tip of the Western Ghats at Agasthyarkoodam and flows 66 km westward, flows through the village. Cheriyakonni has been included in the proposed alignment of the Trivandrum outer ring road project. Major educational institutions such as the College of Architecture (CAT), the G. V. Raja Sports School and IMDR College of Advanced Studies (I-CAS) are situated near the area.

== Constituencies ==
- Taluk – Nedumangadu
- Village – Aruvikkara
- Block – Nedumangad
- Legislative Constituency – Aruvikkara(MLA Sri. G. Steephen)
- Parliament Constituency – MP Adoor Prakash(Attingal)
- Post Office Cheriya Konni
- PIN 695 013
