= Peringammala =

- village
- Location in Kerala, India Peringammala (India)
- Coordinates: 8.4156°N 77.0192°E
- Country: India
- State: Kerala
- District: Thiruvananthapuram
- Taluk: Thiruvananthapuram

Government
  - Body: Gram panchayat

Languages
  - Official: Malayalam, English
- Time zone: UTC+5:30 (IST)
- PIN: 695042
- Vehicle registration: KL-01

Peringammala is a village in Thiruvananthapuram district in the state of Kerala, India. It is 3 km away from Venganoor and Pallichal. There are two places named Peringammala in Trivandrum city, the other Peringamala is the second largest panchayat in Kerala.

== Demographics ==
As of 2001 India census, Kalliyoor had a population of 36836 with 18176 males and 18660 females.

== Educational Institutions ==
- Iqbal College

== Bus routes through Peringammala ==
Route	Via	End
136A	Thiruvallam, Agricultural College, Peringammala	Venganoor
143	Thiruvallam, Venganoor	Peringammala
143A	Thiruvallam, Agricultural College	Peringammala
