= Vembannur =

Village in Kerala, India

Coordinates: 8°34′17″N 77°01′21″E

Vembannur is a village located in the Nedumangad taluk of the Thiruvananthapuram District in Kerala, India. Vembannur comes under the Aruvikkara panchayat of the Nedumangad Taluk.

The main attraction of this small village is the Aruvikkara Dam. This dam was built by the rulers of the Travancore princely state to supply drinking water to the city of Thiruvananthapuram. As of 2012, the water from the dam's reservoir is still in use. The dam is small, with only 20 feet in height, but stores a good capacity of water. There is a bridge connecting Vembannur to the outside world in front of the Dam. A single-track bridge, which is the only road link to the outer world from this village.
