= Thirichittoor Rock =

Thirichittoor Rock Thirichitta Paara
- Rock formation
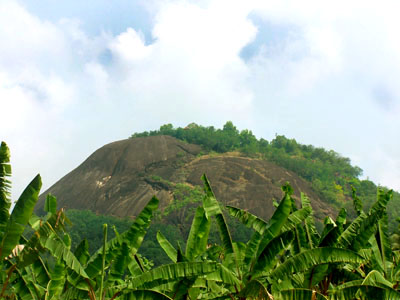

- Coordinates: 8°37′13″N 76°58′57″E
- Location: Thiruvananthapuram, Kerala, India
- Elevation: 150 m (490 ft)

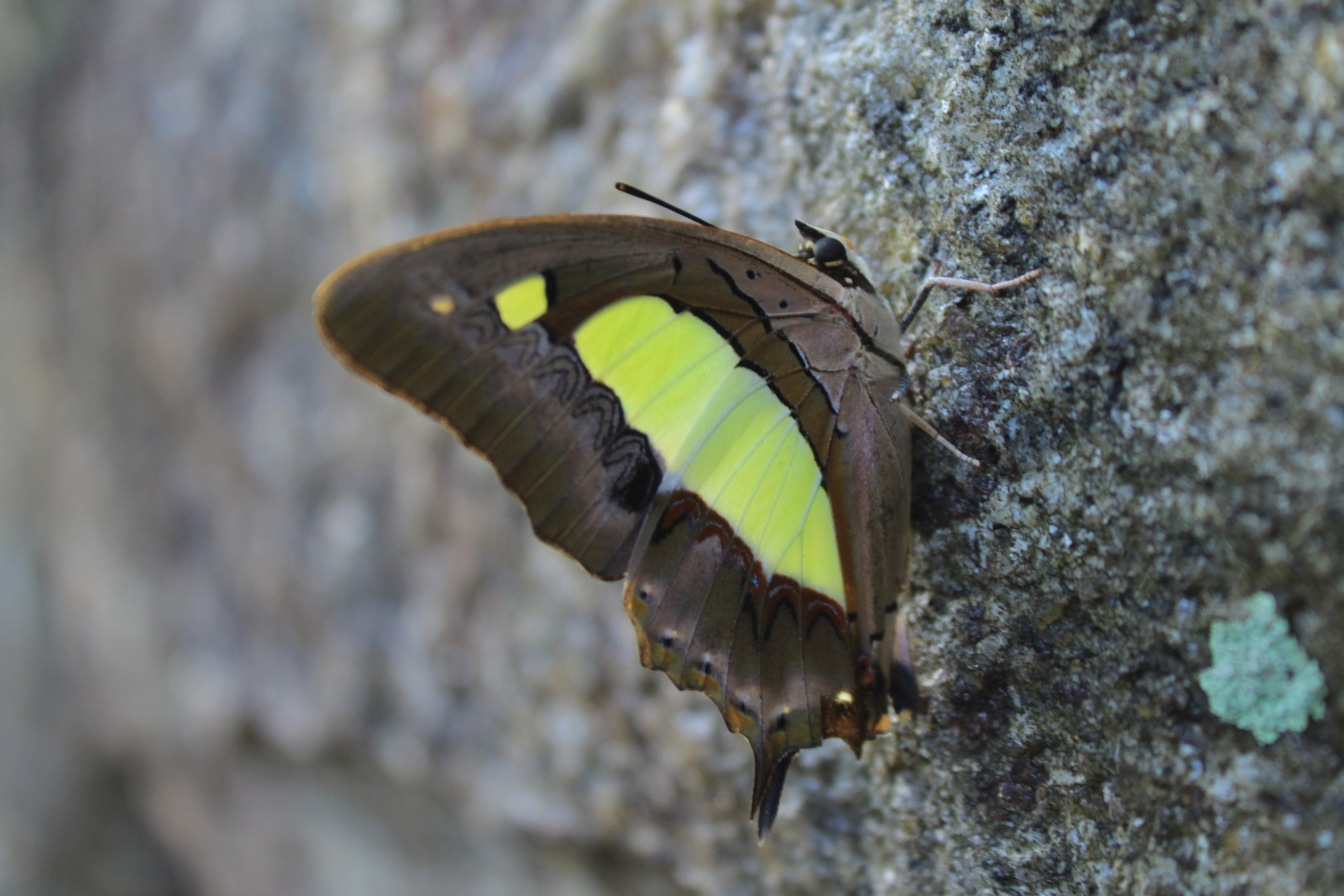
Common nawab butterfly seen at the hilltop

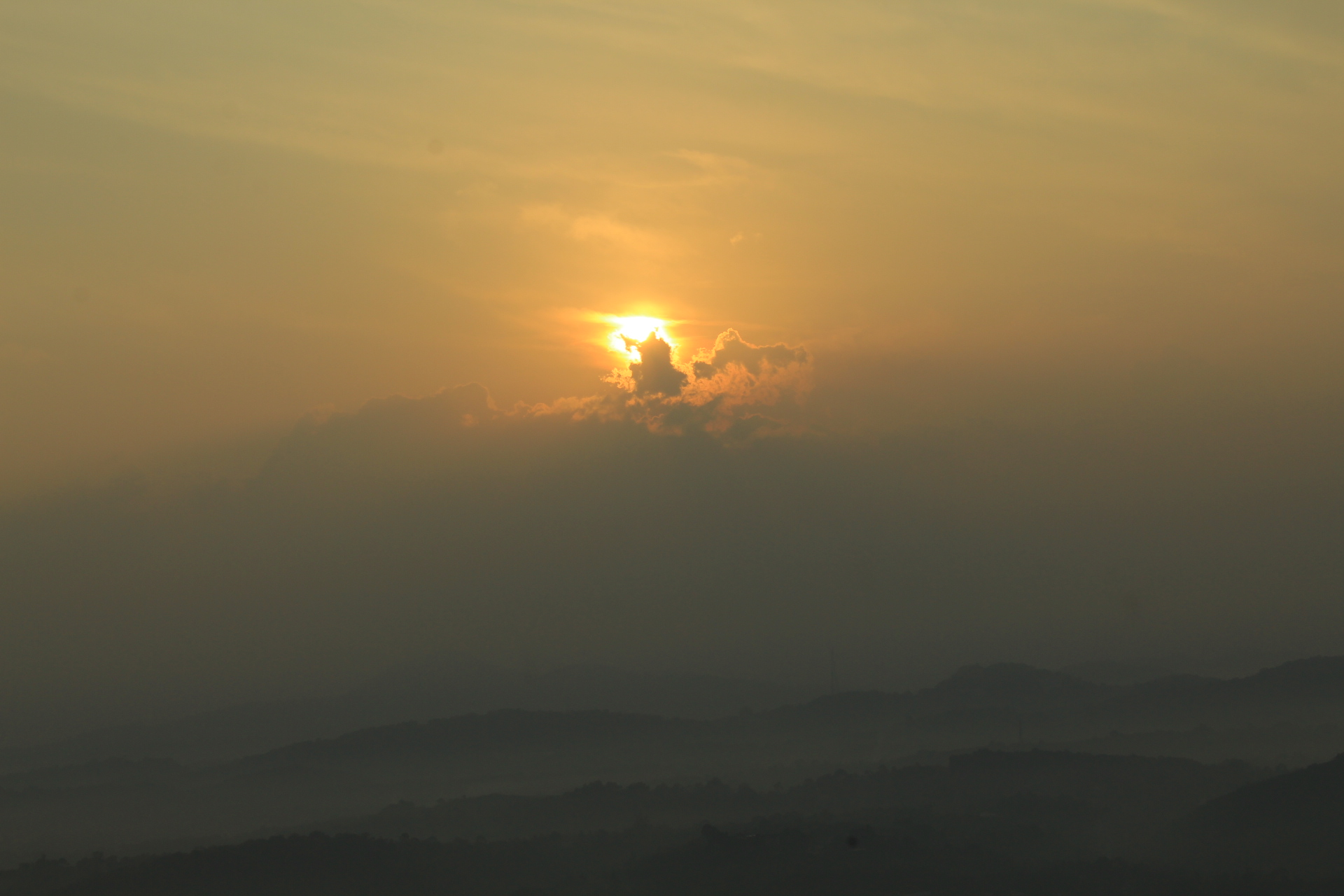
snaps of sunrise from the rock

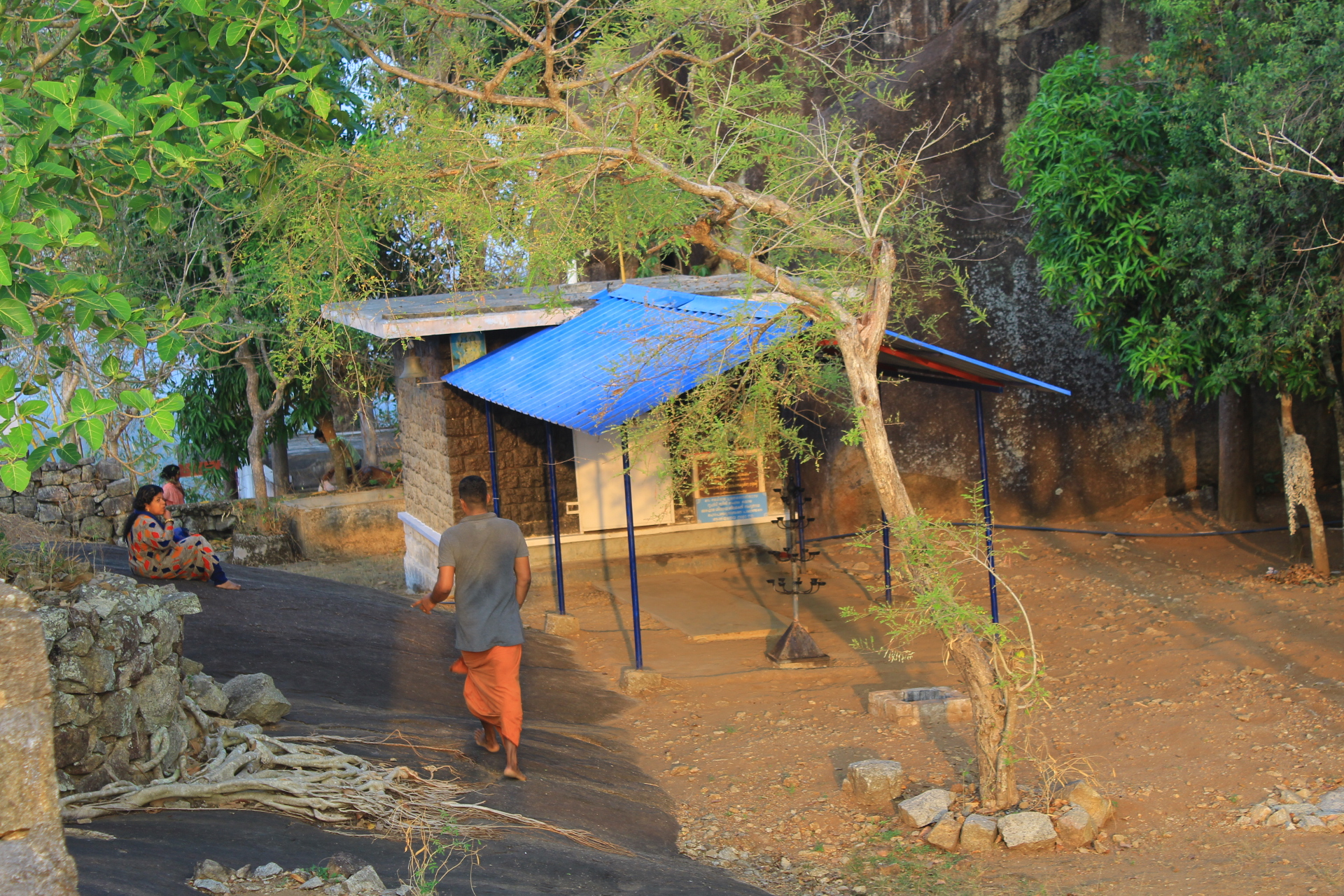
view of the temple

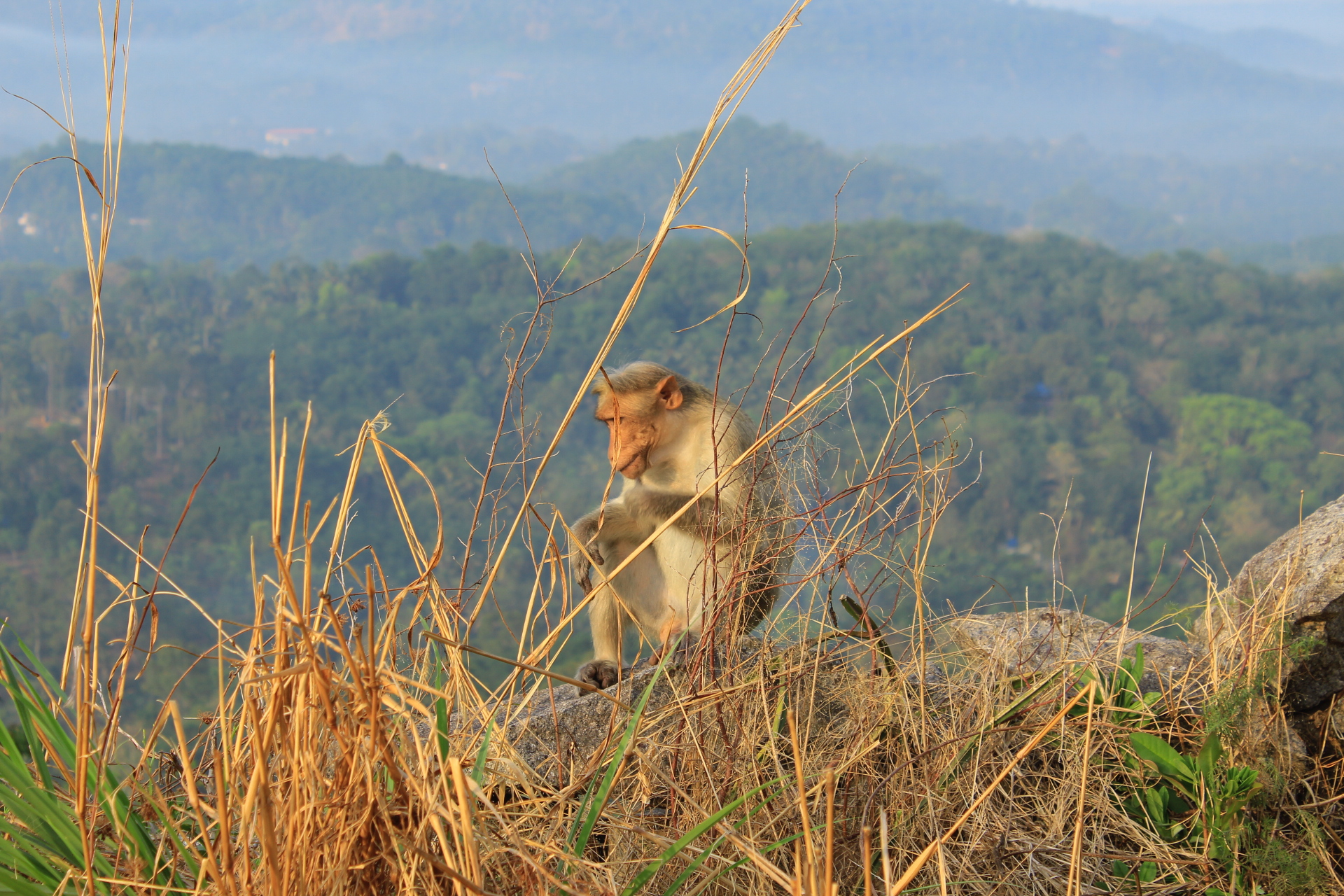
Monkey on top of the hill

Thirichittoor Rock (or Thirichitta Paara) is a large rock located three kilometres north of Nedumangad.

It is written in the Ramayana that Hanuman returned the rock after Sethubandan. "Thirichitta" in the Malayalam language means return or turn.to

The rock is a tourist spot, and those who climb it can enjoy views of the town of Nedumangad and the city of Trivandrum, and visit two temples which have been built on top of the rock. The temples are dedicated to Hanuman, Siva and Vishnu. The temple of Lord Hanuman is situated on top of the rock. Another temple which is under the Travancore Devaswom Board is at the foot of the hill.

Temple timings: Morning 6:00 AM to 9:00 AM and evening from 5:30 PM to 8:00 PM.

How to reach: From Trivandrum international airport it is 23 kms and from Thampanoor railway station and bus station it is around 20 kilometres.

One has to get down at Thirichittoor junction and walk for around 30 minutes to reach the temple.
