= Peringamala =

Peringammala peringammala grama panchayath
- village
- Location in Kerala, India Peringammala (India)
- Coordinates: 8.4156°N 77.0192°E
- Country: India
- State: Kerala
- District: Thiruvananthapuram
- Talukas: Nedumangad

Government
  - Body: Gram panchayat

Population (2011)
  - Total: 19,164

Languages
  - Official: Malayalam, English
- Time zone: UTC+5:30 (IST)
- PIN: 695563
- Vehicle registration: KL-21-

Peringammala is a panchayat in Thiruvananthapuram district in the state of Kerala, India. There are two places named Peringammala, the other one is between Balaramapuram and Venganoor which is on the southern side of the Thiruvananthapuram district.There is two villages Peringammala and Thennoor. Beautiful tourist place in there including Ponmudi, Mankayam, Brimore, etc. Festival Palode Mela also there.

== History ==
The verdant village of Peringammala is located in the valley of the Ponmudi hills. It owes its name to the Tamil/Malayalam word, Periyamala meaning The Big Mountain. In the olden days this area was reputed for various forest produce like honey.

== Geography ==
Peringammala panchayath (an administrative unit) consists of two villages namely Peringammala and Thennoor. Peringammala is the largest panchayth in Thiruvananthapuram district and is the second largest in the state of Kerala. Peringammala shares its east boundary with Tamil Nadu.

== Demographics ==
As of 2011 India census, Peringamala had a population of 19164 with 8918 males and 10246 females. The majority are tribal people and agriculture is the main occupation.

1. Name of Grama Panchayath : Peringammala
2. Village : Peringammala, Thennoor
3. Block Panchayath : Vamanapuram
4. Thalook : Nedumangadu
5. Legislative Mandalam : Vamanapuram
6. Parliament Mandalam : Attingal
7. District : Thiruvananthapuram
8. Breadth : 217.94km2
9. Boundaries
10. East : Ambasamudram(Tamil Nadu)
11. South : Vamanapuram River
12. West : T.S. Road
13. North : Ammayamblam Pacha
(Kulathupuzha Reserve Forest) 14. Population : 39792
15. Female : 20688
16. Male : 19104
17. Tribal people population

18. Scheduled cast Sect : 6147

19. Male : 3041
20. Female : 3105
21. Scheduled Tribe Sect : 3289
22. Male : 1588
23. Female : 1701
24. Block Panchayath Divisions : 2, (Idinjar, Palode)
25. District Panchayath Division : 1, (Palode)
