= Kootayanimoodu Chamundi Temple =

- Chamundi Temple, Kootayanimoodu, Vellanad, Thiruvananthapuram, Kerala

Religion
- Affiliation: Hinduism
- District: Thiruvananthapuram
- Deity: Chamundeeswari
- Festivals: Ramayana Maasacharana, Pongala, Pooja Vaipu

Location
- Location: Kootayanimoodu, Vellanad
- State: Kerala
- Country: India
- Interactive map of Kootayanimoodu Chamundi Temple
- Coordinates: 8°33′46.1″N 77°03′17.6″E

Architecture
- Type: Architecture of Kerala

Specifications
- Temple: One
- Elevation: 93.75 m (308 ft)

Kootayanimoodu sri Chamundeswari temple is a Hindu temple, This ancient temple dates back to the 18th century. The temple is dedicated to Chamundeswari Devi, who is a form of Durga / Shakti.The temple is located in kootayanimoodu, Vellanadu panchayat, Thiruvananthapuram district, Kerala and is one of the oldest temples in the state.

== Religious context ==
Chamunda Devi is considered as the wrathful form of Durga, but at the same time, the Goddess is kind to her true devotees.

The term 'Chamunda' has been derived from two words, 'Chanda' and 'Munda'. As per the mythological legends, Durga made a goddess with her power, to slay the demons, Chanda and Munda. With her immense power, the Goddess killed the demons. Goddess Durga became happy with the slaughter and blessed the goddess that she would be known and worshipped as Chamunda.

In Hinduism, Chamundi, Chamundeshwari and Charchika, is a fearsome aspect of Devi, the Hindu Divine Mother and one of the seven Matrikas (mother goddesses). She is also one of the chief Yoginis, a group of sixty-four or eighty-one Tantric goddesses, who are attendants of Durga. She is closely associated with Kali, another fierce aspect of Devi. She is sometimes identified with goddesses Parvati and Chandi as well. The goddess is often portrayed as haunting cremation grounds or fig trees, and is worshipped by ritual animal sacrifices along with offerings of wine. In the ancient times, human sacrifices were offered, too.

== Festivals ==
- Pooja Vaypu - Identical to Dussera festival (Saraswathy Pooja and Vidyarambham)
- Ramayana maasacharana- It is a 31-day festival which is conducted in the last month of the Malayalam calendar year – Karkidakam.
- Pongala- refers to the ritualistic offering of porridge made of rice, sweet brown molasses, coconut gratings, nuts and raisins. Only women devotees are allowed to participate in this ritual. Here it is on 10th of Medom
