= Koyikkal Palace =

Koyikkal Palace and Museum
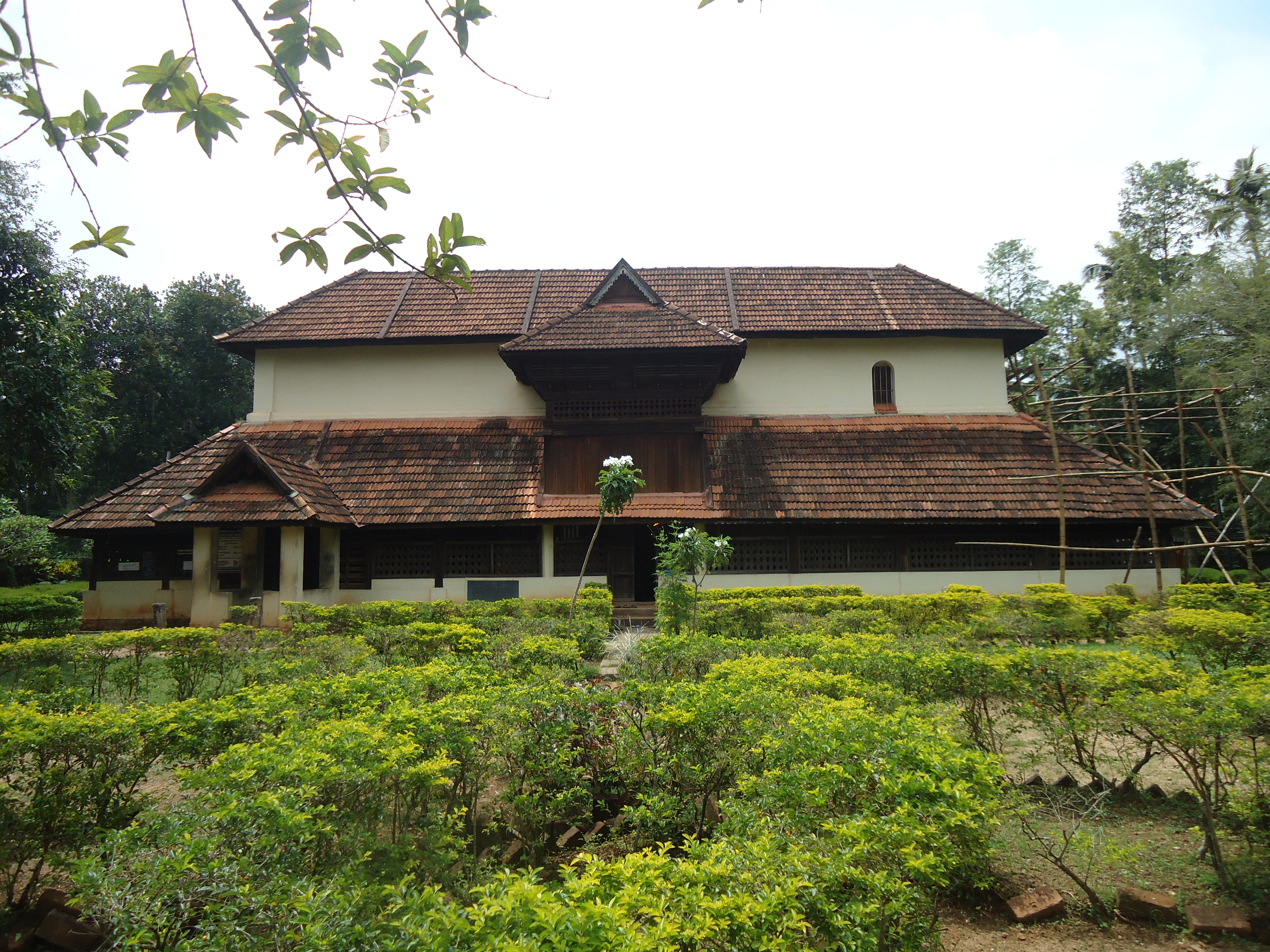
- Established: 1677
- Location: Nedumangad, Kerala, India
- Type: Art museum, Archaeology museum

The Koyikkal Palace is a palace situated in Nedumangadu, Thiruvananthapuram District, Kerala, India. The palace was built in 17th century for Umayamma Rani of the Venad Royal Family. Umayamma Rani was the queen of Venad between 1677 and 1684. The palace is a double storied building and built in the traditional architectural style of Kerala.

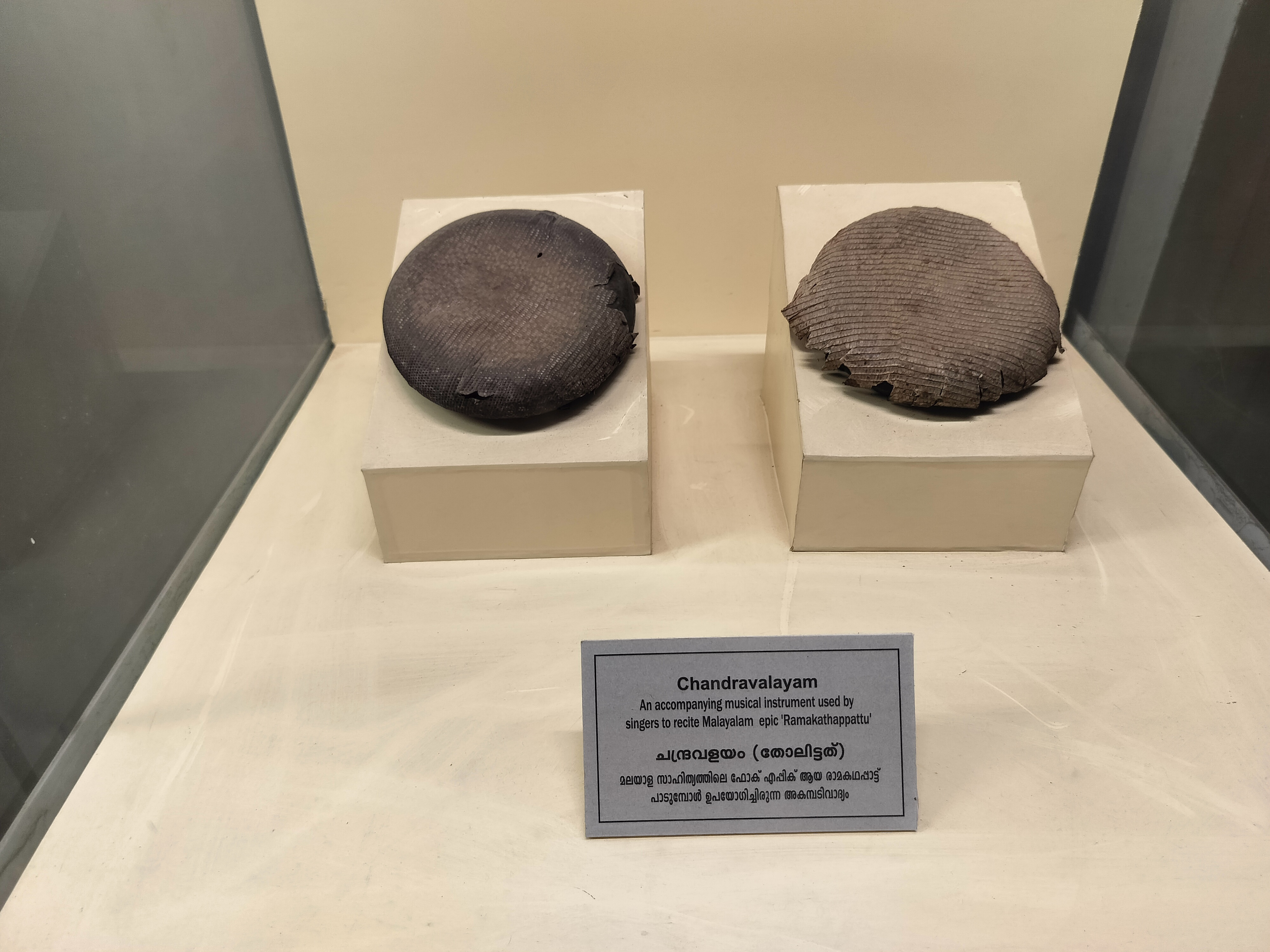
Chandravalayam is an accompanying musical instrument used by singers to recite Malayalam epic 'Ramakathappattu'

The palace is maintained by the Kerala State Department of Archaeology, and also hosts folklore and a numismatic museums. The exhibits in the museum contains such rare instruments as the "Chandravalam", a small percussion instrument used in Ramakathappattu; and the "Nanthuni", a small musical instrument made of wood and string used in Onappattu.
