= Koliyakode =

- village
- Location in Kerala, India Koliyakode (India)
- Coordinates: 8°38′0″N 76°54′0″E
- Country: India
- State: Kerala
- District: Thiruvananthapuram
- Talukas: Nedumangad

Government
  - Body: Gram panchayat manikkal

Population (2011)
  - Total: 19,274

Languages
  - Official: Malayalam, English
- Time zone: UTC+5:30 (IST)
- PIN: 695607
- Vehicle registration: KL-21

Koliyakode is a village in Thiruvananthapuram district in the state of Kerala, India.

== Demographics ==
As of 2011 India census, Koliyakode had a population of 19274 with 9102 males and 10172 females.
