= Nellanad =

- village
- Location in Kerala, India Nellanad (India)
- Coordinates: 8.6937°N 76.9057°E
- Country: India
- State: Kerala
- District: Thiruvananthapuram
- Talukas: Nedumangad

Government
  - Body: Gram panchayat

Population (2011)
  - Total: 25,981

Languages
  - Official: Malayalam, English
- Time zone: UTC+5:30 (IST)
- PIN: 695607
- Vehicle registration: KL-21

Nellanad is a village in Thiruvananthapuram district in the state of Kerala, India.

== Demographics ==
As of 2011 India census, Nellanad had a population of 25981 with 12190 males and 13791 females.
