= Tholicode =

- village
- Location in Kerala, India Tholicode (India)
- Coordinates: 8.6526°N 77.0704°E
- Country: India
- State: Kerala
- District: Thiruvananthapuram
- Talukas: Nedumangad

Government
  - Body: Gram panchayat

Population (2011)
  - Total: 31,784

Languages
  - Official: Malayalam, English
- Time zone: UTC+5:30 (IST)
- PIN: 695541
- Vehicle registration: KL-21

Tholicode is a village in Vithura Thiruvananthapuram district in the state of Kerala, India.

== Demographics ==
As of 2011 India census, Tholicode had a population of 31784 with 14925 males and 16859 females.
