= Theakada =

Thekkada Thekkada
- village
- Location in Kerala, India Thekkada (India)
- Coordinates: 8.631218°N 76.955488°E
- Country: India
- State: Kerala
- District: Thiruvananthapuram
- Talukas: Nedumangad

Government
  - Body: Gram panchayat

Population (2011)
  - Total: 13,567

Languages
  - Official: Malayalam, English
- Time zone: UTC+5:30 (IST)
- PIN: 695615
- Vehicle registration: KL-21

Thekkada is a village in Thiruvananthapuram district in the state of Kerala, India.

== Demographics ==
As of 2011 India census, Thekkada had a population of 13567 with 6459 males and 7108 females.
