= Uzhamalackal =

- village
- Location in Kerala, India Uzhamalackal (India)
- Coordinates: 8.6044°N 77.0552°E
- Country: India
- State: Kerala
- District: Thiruvananthapuram
- Talukas: Nedumangad

Government
  - Body: Gram panchayat

Population (2011)
  - Total: 21,472

Languages
  - Official: Malayalam, English
- Time zone: UTC+5:30 (IST)
- PIN: 6XXXXX
- Vehicle registration: KL-

Uzhamalackal is a village in Thiruvananthapuram district of Kerala, India.

== Demographics ==
As of 2011 India census, Uzhamalackal had a population of 21,472, with 10,322 males and 11,150 females.
