= Kurupuzha =

- village
- Location in Kerala, India Kurupuzha (India)
- Coordinates: 8°39′35″N 77°1′35″E
- Country: India
- State: Kerala
- District: Thiruvananthapuram
- Talukas: Nedumangad

Government
  - Body: Gram panchayat

Population (2011)
  - Total: 10,167

Languages
  - Official: Malayalam, English
- Time zone: UTC+5:30 (IST)
- PIN: 6XXXXX
- Vehicle registration: KL-

Kurupuzha is a village in Thiruvananthapuram district in the state of Kerala, India.

== Demographics ==
As of 2011 India census, Kurupuzha had a population of 10167 with 4719 males and 5448 females.
