= Vithura =

- Town
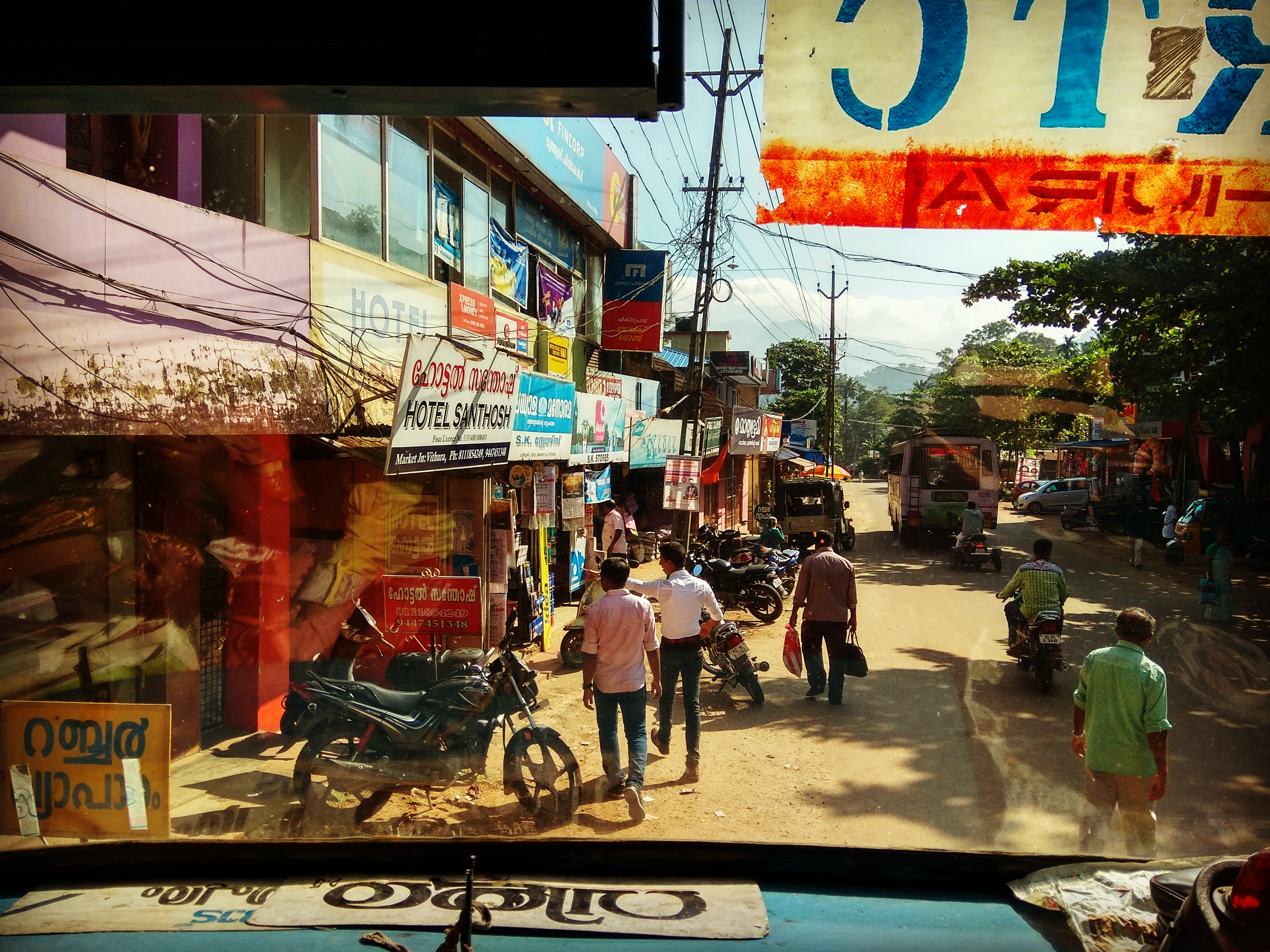
- VITHURA

- Location in Kerala, India Vithura (India)
- Coordinates: 8.6818°N 77.1022°E
- Country: India
- State: Kerala
- District: Thiruvananthapuram
- Talukas: Nedumangad

Government
  - Body: Gram panchayat

Population (2011)
  - Total: 18,437

Languages
  - Official: Malayalam, English
- Time zone: UTC+5:30 (IST)
- PIN: 695551
- Vehicle registration: KL-21
- Nearest city: Thiruvananthapuram
- Lok Sabha constituency: Attingal

Vithura, also known as the Hill City Of Thiruvananthapuram, is located 36 km from Thiruvananthapuram capital of the Kerala state in India. Vithura is the culmination of the crossroads to many tourist, cultural, and religious centres. Surrounded by the Western Ghats (Sahyadris), Vithura is a tourist spot. The village has a good climate year-round. The Indian Institute of Science Education and Research, Thiruvananthapuram campus is situated here.

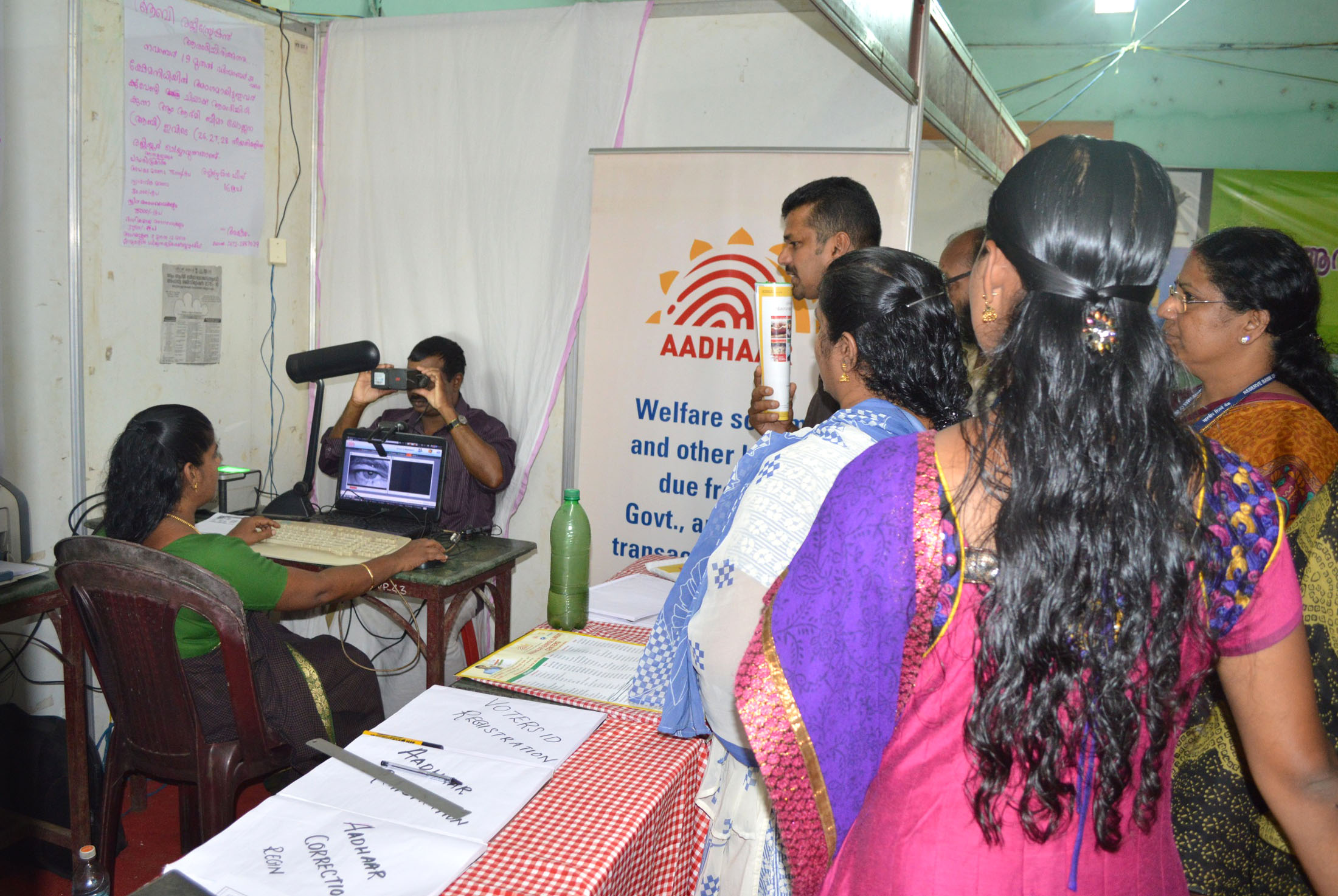
AADHAR registration camp at Vithura Grama Panchayath

== Demography ==
Vithura is a town located in Nedumangad Taluk of Thiruvananthapuram district, Kerala with total 5164 families residing. Population of Vithura counts 18437 persons of which 8680 are males while 9757 are females as per Population Census 2011. Vithura village has lower literacy rate compared to Kerala. In 2011, literacy rate of Vithura village was 88.64% compared to 94.00% of Kerala. Here, male literacy stands at 92.18% while female literacy rate was 85.54%. Schedule Tribe (ST) constitutes 18.17% while Schedule Caste (SC) were 12.37% of total population here. The 2001 census reported a population of 26,927.

== Places of worship ==
The following are some of the places of worship in Vithura:

- All Saints Syro-Malabar Church, at Koppam Vithura
- CSI Church Chayam
- CSI CHURCH Vithura
- Divine Providence Latin Catholic Church Vithura
- Makki Sri Dharmasastha Kshethram Vithura
- Muhiyudheen Jumah Masjid
- Sree Krishnaswami Temple
- Sri Bhadrakali Devi Temple (Kulamancode), at Pulichamala
- Sri Bhadrakali Devi Temple, at Chayam Vithura
- Sri Mahadeva Devi Temple, at Sivan Kovil Vithura
- Sri Mahaganapathi Temple Maruthamala Vithura
- Sri Mariyamman Devi Temple, Kallar
- Sri Mudipura Bhadrakali Devi Temple at Sivan Covil Jn
- Sri Muthumariyamman Kovil, at Memala, Vithura
- Sri Subhramanya kshethram chayam Vithura
- St. George Orthodox Church
- St. Joseph Latin Catholic Church Vithura
- St. Mary's Malankara Catholic Church Vithura
- The Pentecostal Mission Vithura (TPM)
- Vellamkanni Matha church Vithura

== Educational institutions ==
There are a large number of government schools and other educational institutions in the area. These include campuses of the Indian Institute of Science Education and Research, Thiruvananthapuram and the Indian Institute of Space Science and Technology Valiyamala near Vithura.

== Tourist spots ==
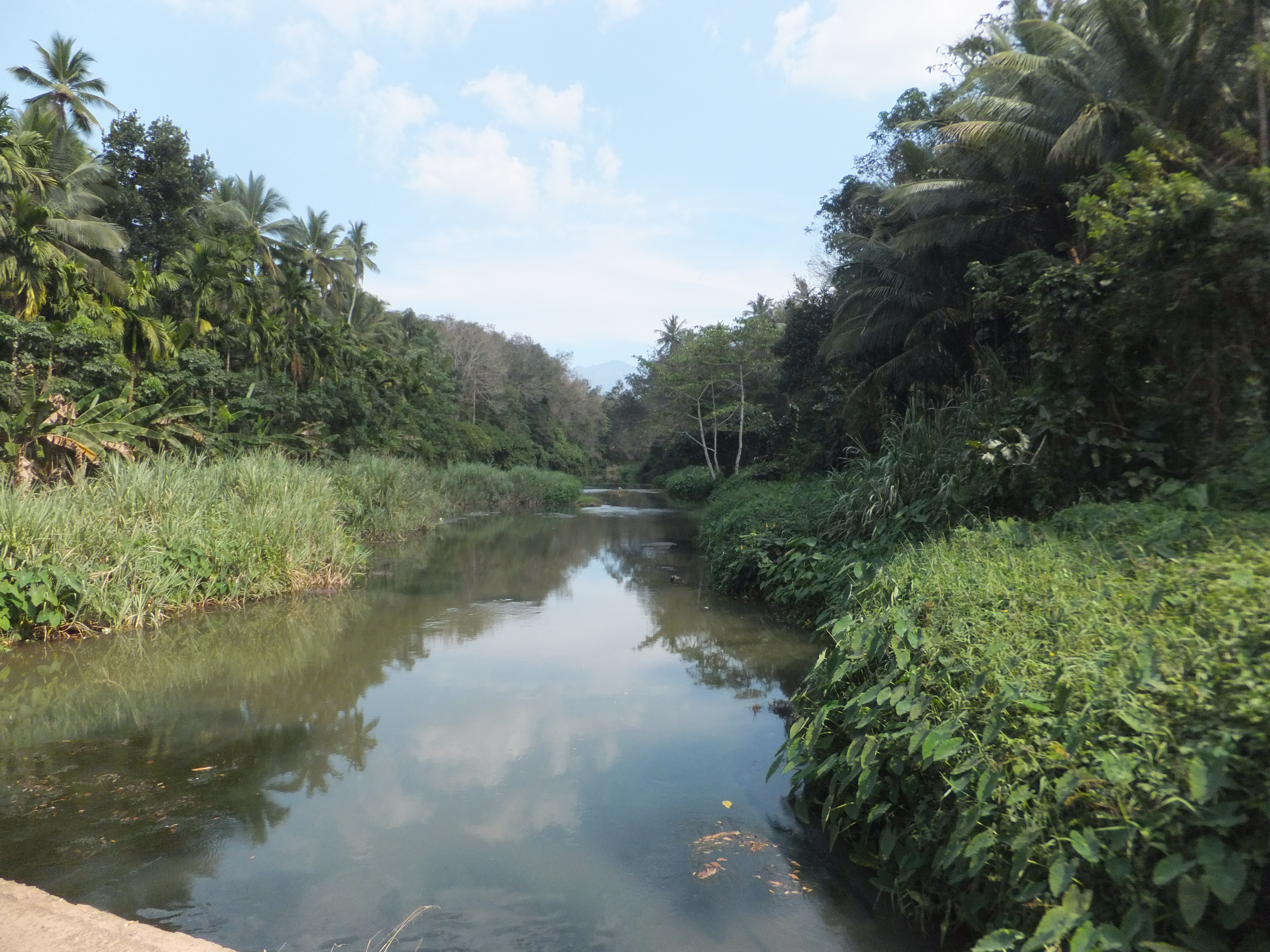
Vamanapuram river that flows through Vithura

There are several rubber plantations throughout the area. Prominent tourist spots include Ponmudi, Peppara Dam, Meenmutty Falls, Bonacaud and Agastyakoodam. Nearby, Vithura is near the Iruthalamoola Junction Bus stop in the Tholicode Panchayath. Iru in Malayalam means two, thala means head and moola means corner, suggesting that the place gets its name from the two roads from Trivandrum to Ponmudi and Vithura to Aryanad meeting here. Lush green paddy fields, rubber plantations, and coconut gardens abound in Vithura. The local kalaris (Traditional Martial Arts Schools) in the region does exist.

=== Places of interest ===
- Agastyarkoodam Trekking
- Athirumala Base Camp
- Attayar
- Bonacaud Tea Gardens
- Golden Valley
- Kallar River
- Lower Meenmutty dam
- Pandi pathu
- Peppara Dam
- Peppara Hydro Electric Power Station
- Ponmudi Hill Resorts
- Thavakkal Water Fall
- Thavakkal Waterfall
- Vamanapuram River
- Vazhvanthol Waterfalls
