= Panavoor =

- village
- Location in Kerala, India Panavoor (India)
- Coordinates: 8.6640°N 76.9858°E
- Country: India
- State: Kerala
- District: Thiruvananthapuram
- Talukas: Nedumangad

Government
  - Body: Gram panchayat

Population (2011)
  - Total: 20,348

Languages
  - Official: Malayalam, English
- Time zone: UTC+5:30 (IST)
- PIN: 695568
- Vehicle registration: KL-21

Panavoor is a village in the Thiruvananthapuram district of Kerala, India.

== Demographics ==
As of 2011 India census, Panavoor had a population of 20,348, with 9,597 males and 10,751 females.
