= Thennoor =

Thennoor Thennooran
- Village
- Location in Kerala, India Thennoor (India)
- Coordinates: 8.70682°N 77.069306°E
- Country: India
- State: Kerala
- District: Thiruvananthapuram
- Talukas: Nedumangad

Government
  - Type: Panchayati raj,(india)
  - Body: peringammala, Gram panchayat

Languages
  - Official: language: Malayalam, English, Hindi, Tamil
- Time zone: UTC+5:30 (IST)
- PIN: 695563
- Vehicle registration: KL-21-

Thennoor is a small village in Thiruvananthapuram district of Peringammala panjayath in Kerala, India. Thennoor is a prime tourist spot. Local tourist spots include Ponmudi and Mankayam eco tourism.
