= Kallara, Thiruvananthapuram =

Kallara
- village
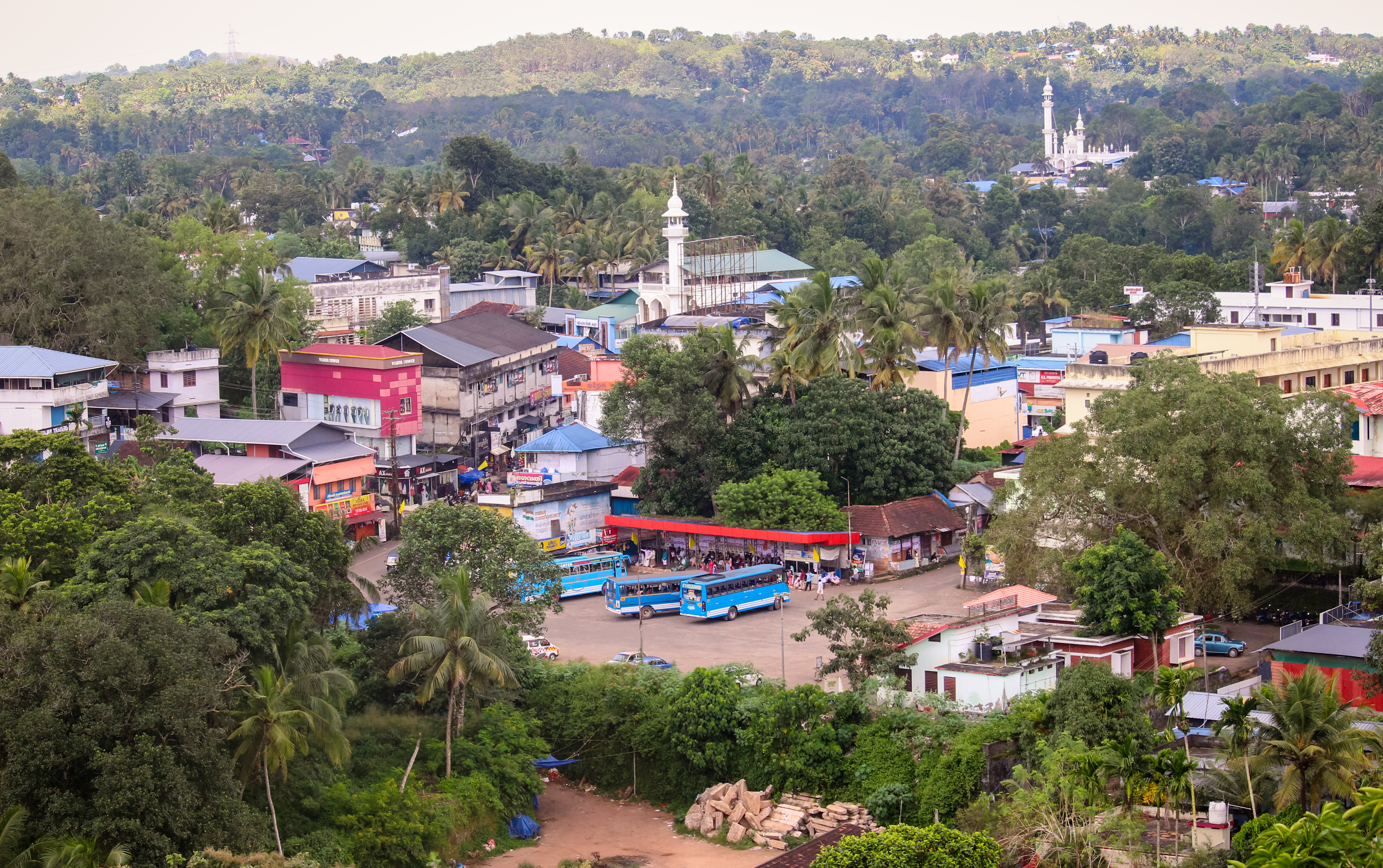
- View of Kallara town

- Location in Kerala, India Kallara (India)
- Coordinates: 8.712718°N 76.952361°E
- Country: India
- State: Kerala
- District: Thiruvananthapuram
- Talukas: Nedumangad

Government
  - Body: Gram panchayat

Population (2001)
  - Total: 25,779 including Arya Pushkaran

Languages
  - Official: Malayalam, English
- Time zone: UTC+5:30 (IST)
- PIN: 695608
- Telephone code: 0472-28
- Vehicle registration: KL-01, KL-16, KL-21
- Nearest city: Trivandrum
- Lok Sabha constituency: Attingal
- Vidhan Sabha constituency: Vamanapuram

Kallara is a village and a Grama Panchayat in Thiruvananthapuram district in the state of Kerala, India. It is located near Karette, a junction in the MC road.

Kallara is located approximately 40 km from Thiruvananthapuram city, 7 km from the State Highway, and 20 km from National Highway 47.

″The Kallara-Pangode Freedom Struggle″ is one of the 39 agitations declared by the Government of India as the movements that led to the country gaining independence from the British rule. It is listed alongside some of the most important movements of Indian independence such as Quit India Movement, Khilafat Movement, Malabar Rebellion, the Ghaddar Movement and Hollwell Revolt Movement by Netaji Subhash Chandra Bose. It is ranked 26th among the 39 most revered movements that were part of Indian Independence Movement and culminated in the British rule ending over Indian territories in 1947.

Kallara Vocational Higher Secondary School located in kallara town (100 years). One of the Famous Temple "Kallara Ayiravilly Kshethram", Grameena grandasala and Islamic reading room situated in pattara also ti be mentioned. Kallara is a secular panchayath, here peoples of all religion hold their hands together for over all development. The famous temple Thumpodu mudippura devi temple is situated in Thumpodu ward of kallara panchayath Raktha sakshi mandapam, in memory of those who shed blood in kallara pangodu revolution is situated in the town. Juma masjid of kallara is also situated in the town, thousands of devotees used to come and pray here.

Kallara is famous for the south indian top movie stars, sisters AMBIKA and RADHA and their mother KALLARA SARASAMMA close aid of K karunakaran for 40 years.

Kallara in Trivandrum district is mostly derived by the "Nair" Community, who were close aid at the kingdom of Kilimanoor palace. 2 centuries ago it was thick forest and rough regions and Nair’s conquered these forests with the approval of the king from the Kilimanoor Palace. Though it is a Nair dominated community, Kollam vilakathu veedu(Mr.Dhamodharan Pillai connection with Kilimanoor Palace) is one of the Nair families in Pankadu, Kallara has a mixture of all caste and religions, including an Islam community. Communities of kallara live with harmony among all walk of people, caste and religion and Kallara town serves as a junction for many businesses connecting to several local areas, such as Pangodu, kilimanoor, palode, which extend to the Tamil Nadu Border to Schencotah and Coutralam through a hilly route, within 40 km. Pangodu police station and kilimanoor police station serves the areas of Kallara, and crimes are relatively less due to the close knit community living.

== Demographics ==
As of 2001 India census, Kallara had a population of 25,779 with 12,080 males and 13,699 females.

== Politics ==
Assembly constituency: Vamanapuram Lok Sabha constituency: Attingal.
