= K. V. Surendranath =

Indian politician

K. V. Surendranath (died 9 September 2005) was a former MP of India Thiruvananthapuram. He was a leader of Communist Party of India.
