= Nedumangad =

- Municipality
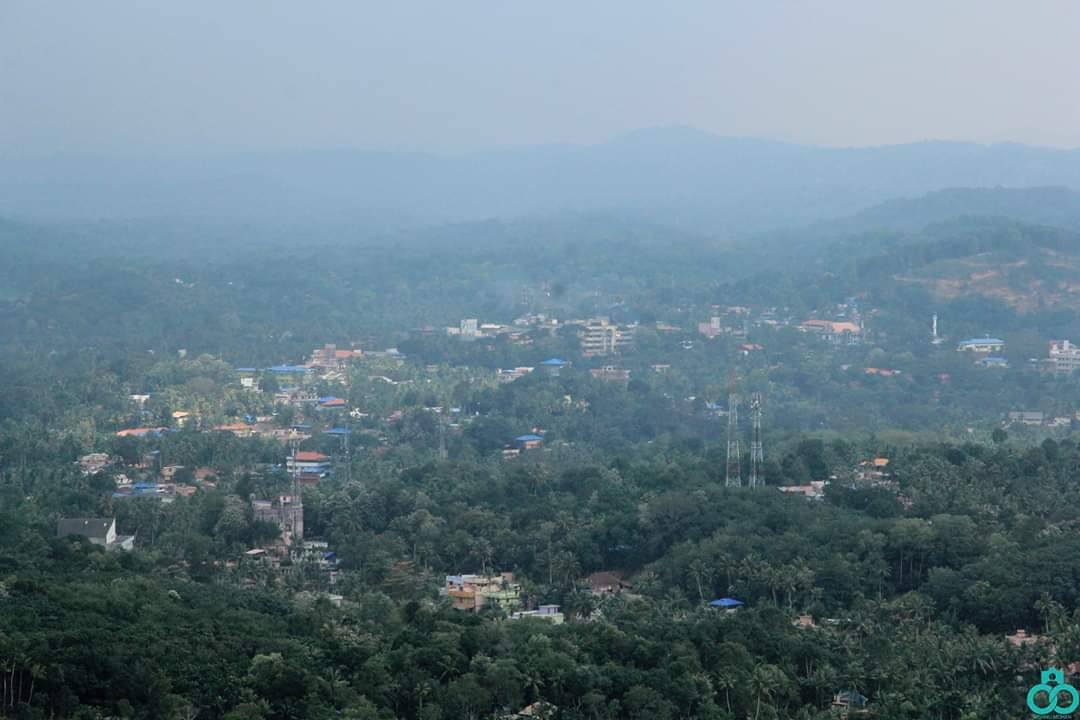
- Aerial view of Nedumangad town

- Location in Kerala Nedumangad (India)
- Coordinates: 8°36′12″N 77°00′10″E
- Country: India
- State: Kerala
- District: Thiruvananthapuram

Government
  - Type: Municipality
  - Body: Nedumangad Municipality (Rating: A Grade since 2014)

Area
  - Total: 32.52 km^{2} (12.56 sq mi)
  - Rank: 1st
- Elevation: 68 m (223 ft)

Population (2011)
  - Total: 60,161
  - Rank: 2nd
  - Density: 1,850/km^{2} (4,800/sq mi)

Languages
  - Official: Malayalam, English
- Time zone: UTC+5:30 (IST)
- Postal code: 695541, 695561
- Area code: 0472
- Vehicle registration: KL–21
- Website: Official website

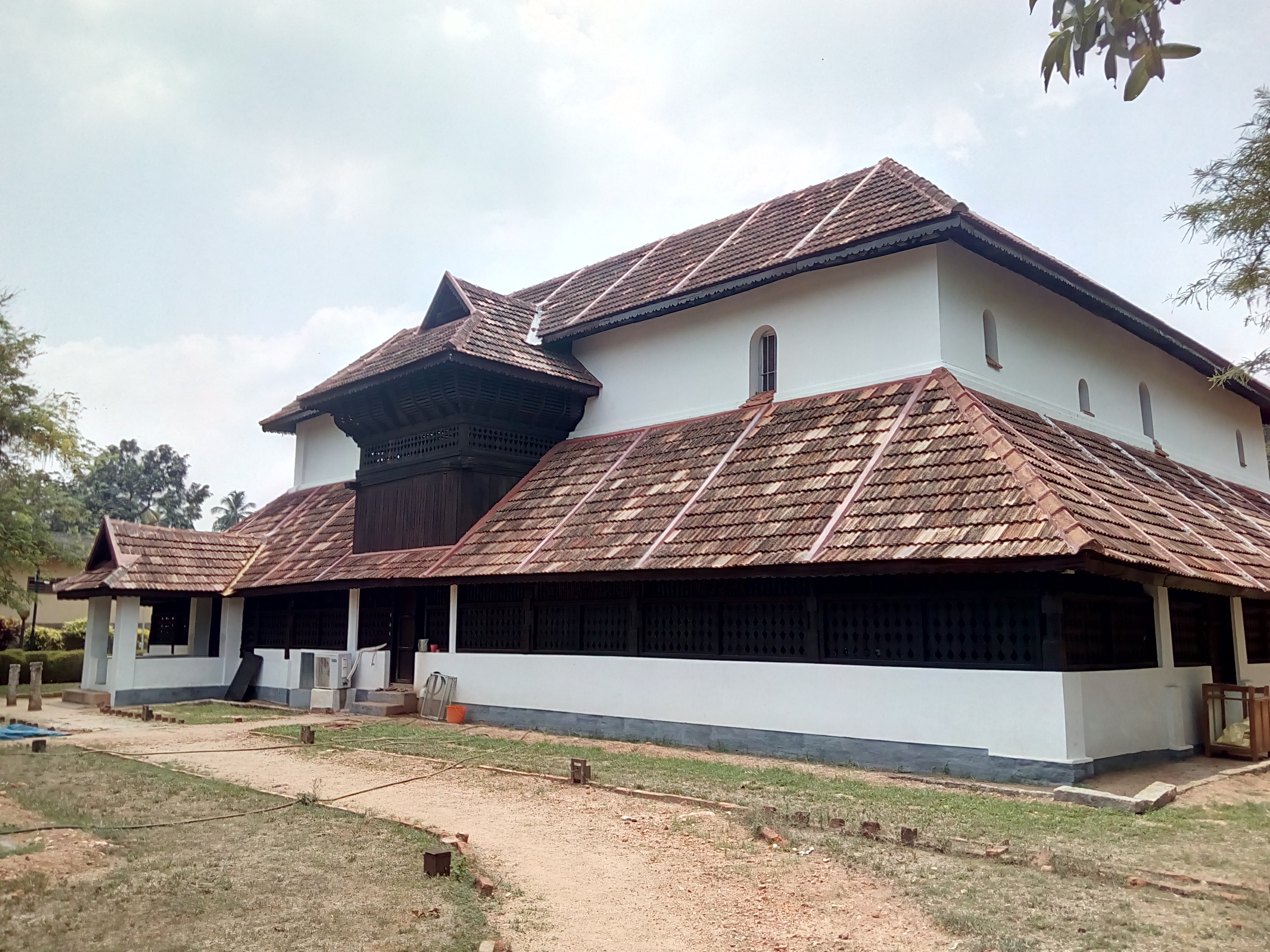
Koyikkal palace

Nedumangad is a municipal town in the Thiruvananthapuram district in the Indian state of Kerala. It is the headquarters of Nedumangad Tehsil and Nedumangad Revenue Division. It is a suburb of the extended metropolitan region of Thiruvananthapuram. It is located around 16 km (9.9 mi) to the north-east of Thiruvananthapuram on the State Highway 2.

It is an important centre for commercial trade in hill products such as pepper and rubber. A wholesale market set up by the Department of Agriculture (with the assistance of the European Union) is also situated there.

== History ==
Nedumangad panchayat was formed in 1936. It was one among the four Panchayats sanctioned by Sir C.P.Ramaswamy Iyer (Diwan-Thiruvithamcore). The others were Paravur, Boothapandi and Perumbavoor. In 1978 Nedumangad Municipality was established.

=== Nedumangad Chantha Revolt ===
Nedumangad was a main center of trade in Thiruvananthapuram District. Lower caste people were not allowed to enter in the trade markets (Chantha) of Nedumangad and items brought by them from their farms have to be placed outside and used to get a lower price. A group of people under the leadership of Ayyankali questioned this social injustice which resulted in a great revolt and fought back their rights to enter and sell the goods of lower caste people in Nedumangad market and the trade markets nearby. This is known as Nedumangad Chantha revolt.

== Etymology ==
There are still many opinions as to how the taluk Nedumangad got its name. It is said that there is a fruit called Neduvan and that it is the land of a local ruler named Neduvan. According to some historical sources, the old name of Nedumangad was Ilavallur Nadu.

=== Social and cultural history ===
The adivasis are the tribal people of the region. From 1677 to 1689 AD, Umayamurani, who ruled Travancore, lost a battle and escaped to Koyikkal Palace, Nedumangad. The queen sought the help of Kerala Varma to defeat the Mukkappappa. History has indicated that Kerala Varma defeated Mukulapada in Thiruvattar and took Umayamma Rani to Thiruvananthapuram. With the arrival of Umayamma Rani to Koyikkal Palace, merchants, gold smiths and the Tamil Brahmins who became Puajaris also settled here. The Tamil Brahmins became the heirs of most land in the area. The palace at Karipur, Pulellunthu Mallan's family head, Karippur Mudipura are some of the historical places linked to the ancient history of Nedumangad. Nedumangad Koyikkal palace is one of the few buildings that was built in the 15th century Kerala Architectural style. The historic Koyikkal Palace has been maintained since 1979 by the Kerala State Department of Archaeology. Nedumangad Street struggle was one of the historical struggles of the national movement during Independence. The LLA LP School, which started as "Pallalu school", is the first school to be established here. The first library was the Guruvayur Vidyalaya. Karimbikkavu Sree DharmaSastha Temple, Thirichittoor Siva-Vishnu Temple, Mannamkonam Sree Bhagavathy Temple, Indalayappan Temple, Ardhanarisheshwara Temple, Muthumariamman Temple, Melamcode Temple, Mutharamman Temple, Pathadavu, Pazhavadi Ganapati Temple, Paranthokha Bhagwati Temple, Nedumangad Town Muslim Jamaath Complex and the Christian Church are some of the oldest shrines in the region. Nedumangad's commercial history is connected with agriculture. Nedumangad Public Market is the largest market in the district of Thiruvananthapuram. It is the largest market for the hill stations and agricultural commodities. The Agrarian Sales Complex, by the Department of Agriculture, is set up with the help of the European Economic Community. Thiruvananthapuram - Chenkotta (State Highway 2) and Shorlakode – Nedumangad State Highway (SH 3) are the most important interstate routes passing through Nedumangad. The road that connects Ponmudi to Thiruvananthapuram City passes through Nedumangad. The distance from Nedumangad to the capital city is only 18 km. The first Folklore Museum and the Museum of Numismatics in Kerala was established at Nedumangad Koyikkal Palace on 27 March 1992. The Koyikkal Palace is located next to the municipal office. Liquid Propulsion Systems Centre (LPSC), a research and development centre functioning under Indian Space Research Organisation (ISRO), is located at Valiyamala near Nedumangad.

== Geography ==
Nedumangad is located at 8.6°N 77.0°E. It has an average elevation of 68 metres (223 feet).

It lies 18 km from Thiruvananthapuram on the way to Thenkasi and Ponmudi hill resort. It is the capital of the taluk and is unique for lacking a coastal belt and railway lines.

It is bounded on the west by Thiruvananthapuram Taluk, on the east by the State of Tamil Nadu, on the south by Neyyattinkara Taluk and on the north by Kollam District.

== Places of interest ==
Nedumangad is a gate way of various tourist places in Thiruvananthapuram District. The main attractions are: Agasthyarkoodam, a mountain preserve famous for its abundant ayurvedic herbs and medicinal plants is around 50 km away. About 32 km from Nedumangad, en route to the Ponmudi Hill Resort lies the Peppara Wildlife Sanctuary, which is of particular interest to ornithologists. Near Nedumangad town another Monolithic – Thirichittoor Rock (Thiruchittapara) is located. With Siva Vishnu Temple, many monkeys congregated here. The name Nedumangadu means kadu (forest) of Vishnu, who was called Neduman, Neduvan, and Nediyavan in ancient texts like Chilappadikaram.

Kerala's Numismatic museum is at Koikkal Palace within Nedumangad Town. The palace was the residence of one of the prominent matriarchal lines of Travancore.

- Aruvikkara Dam
- Peppara Dam
- Neyyar Dam
- Mankayam waterfalls
- Vazhvanthol waterfalls
- Meenmutty waterfalls
- Lower meenmooty
- Thenmala Dam
- Ponmudi

== Transport ==
=== Road Transport ===
Nedumangad has a road network which connects nearby towns and cities. Four State Highways (SH) pass through Nedumangad. There is no National Highway through Nedumangad. The main interstate road through Nedumangad is Thiruvananthapuram –Thenmala (State Highway 2), which connects Thiruvananthapuram with Tenkasi. Other major roads include SH 3 (connects Surulacod, Kanyakumari and Aralvaimozhi), SH 45 (connects Ponmudi Hill Station), SH 47 (connects Attingal NH 66 and Vembayam) and SH 1 (Main-Central Road). Bus service is operated by Kerala State Road Transport Corporation (KSRTC).

=== Air ===
The nearest airport is Thiruvananthapuram International Airport (TRV), which is about 22 kilometers away.

=== Rail ===
No railway lines pass through Nedumangadu. The nearest railway station is Thiruvananthapuram (18 km), followed by Chirayinkeezhu near Attingal (31 km) and Thenmala railway station (54 km).

== Demographics ==
Population of Children with age of 0–6 is 5676 which is 9.43% of total population of Nedumangad (M). In Nedumangad Municipality, the female sex ratio is 1073 against state average of 1084. Moreover, the child sex ratio in Nedumangad is around 926 compared to Kerala state average of 964. The literacy rate of Nedumangad city is 93.28% lower than state average of 94.00%. In Nedumangad, male literacy is around 95.80% while the female literacy rate is 90.97%.

Religious census
Religion	Percent(%)
Hindu	70.32%
Muslim	17.73%
Christian	11.63%
Sikh	0.00%
Buddhist	0.01%
Jain	0.00%
Other	0.28%

== Administration ==
=== Taluk ===
Nedumangad (tehsil) is bounded on the west by Thiruvananthapuram Taluk, on the east by the State of Tamil Nadu, on the south by Kattakada Taluk and on the north by Kollam District. Nedumangad Taluk has 25 villages and one Municipality headed by tehsildar. It is the second-most-populous and largest taluk in Thiruvananthapuram District.

=== Villages ===
Vithura, Anad, Aruvikkara, Aryanad, Kallara, Karakulam, Karippooru, Koliyakode, Kurupuzha, Manikkal, Nedumangad, Nellanad, Palode, Panavoor, Pangode, Peringamala, Pullampara, Theakada, Thennoor, Tholicode, Uzhamalackal, Vamanapuram, Vattappara, Vellanad, Vembannur, Vembayam

=== Municipalities ===
There is only one municipality, Nedumangad, which is also the headquarters of the taluk. In 1978 Nedumangad panchayath was upgraded into a municipality. The municipality has 42 electoral wards. Adv. R Jayadevan of CPIM is chairperson of Nedumangad Municipality.

=== Assembly constituencies ===
Nedumangad (tehsil) comprises the constituencies of Nedumangadu, Aruvikkara and Vamanapuram. These assembly constituencies are part of Attingal (Lok sabha constituency)

=== Revenue Division ===
Thiruvananthapuram district is divided into two revenue divisions, Thiruvananthapuram and Nedumangad. Nedumangad revenue division comprises Nedumangad and Kattakada taluks headed by Revenue Divisional officer.

=== Block panchayath ===
Nedumangad taluk comprises three block panchayaths: Nedumangad, Vellanad and Vamanapuram. Nedumangad block panchayath consists of five grama panchayaths.

- Anad Grama panchayath
- Aruvikkara Grama panchayath
- Karakulam Grama panchayath
- Panavoor Grama panchayath
- Vembayam Grama panchayath

== Educational institutions ==
- Indian Institute of Space Science and Technology (IIST)
- Indian Institute of Science Education and Research, Thiruvananthapuram
- Government Girls HSS
- Government VHSS for Boys
- Government HSS Poovathoor
- Government HSS Karipooru
- Government Technical HSS
- Government Polytechnic College
- Government College Nedumangad
- Government Teachers Training College
- Government Town LPS
- Government Boys UPS
- Sree Narayana Vilasam HSS, Anad
- Lourdes Mount Higher Secondary School, Vattappara
- Darsana HSS
- Kairali Vidhya Bhavan CBSE
- Nightingale College of Nursing
- Mohandas College of Engineering
- Heera College of Engineering
- Muslim Association College of Arts and Science

== Politics ==
Nedumangad assembly constituency is part of the Attingal (Lok Sabha constituency). G R Anil of CPI is MLA of Nedumangad assembly constituency and Adoor Prakash of INC is MP of Attingal Lok Sabha constituency. Nedumangad assembly constituency includes:

- Nedumangad Municipality
- Karakulam Grama panchayath
- Vembayam Grama panchayath
- Manikkal Grama panchayath
- Pothencode Grama panchayath
- Andoorkonam Grama panchayath

== Places of worship ==
- SreeMuthaaramman Devi Temple
- SreeMuthmaariamman Devi Temple
- Melamcode Devi Temple
- Sree Mahadeva Temple Koyikkal
- Thirichittoor Siva-Vishnu Temple
- Mukhavoor Mahavishnu Temple
- Nedumangad Town Juma Masjid
- Valicode Juma Masjid
- Markas Masjid
- Aurthur Parker Memorial Csi Church
- St Jerome Malankara Catholic Church
- Christhu Raja Forona Church

== See also ==
- Neyyattinkara
- Thiruvananthapuram
- South Paravoor
- Kollam
- palode
