= Anad =

- village
- Location in Kerala, India Anad (India)
- Coordinates: 8.63341°N 77.012220°E
- Country: India
- State: Kerala
- District: Thiruvananthapuram
- Talukas: Nedumangad

Government
  - Type: Panchayati raj (India)
  - Body: Gram panchayat

Population (2001)
  - Total: 30,491

Languages
  - Official: Malayalam, English
- Time zone: UTC+5:30 (IST)
- PIN: 695544
- Vehicle registration: KL-21-

Anad is a village in Thiruvananthapuram district in the state of Kerala, India.
