= Aruvikkara Dam =

Dam in Kerala, India

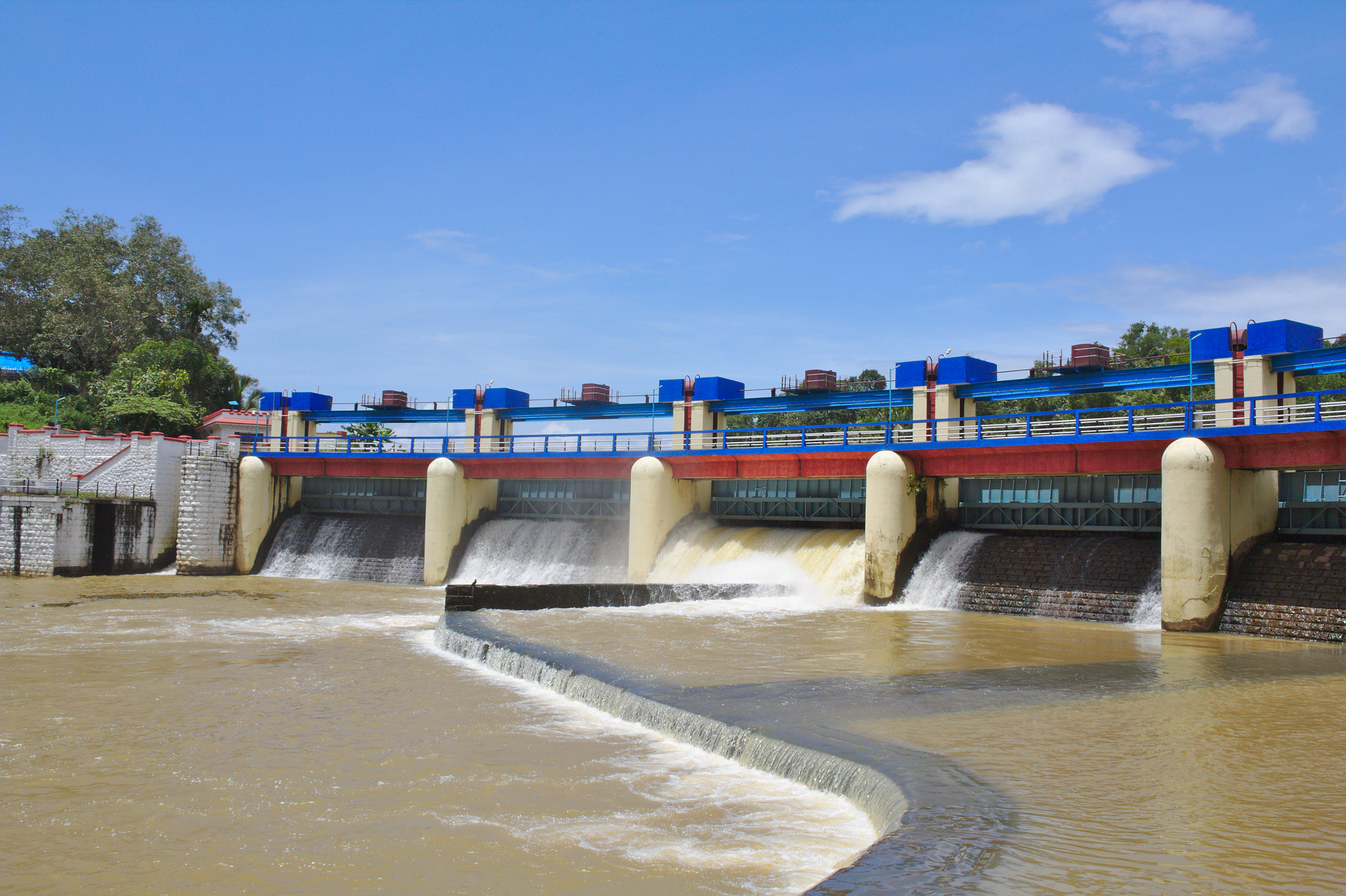
- Aruvikkara dam (2017)

- Location in Kerala Aruvikkara Dam (India)
- Country: India
- Location: Thiruvananthapuram, Kerala
- Coordinates: 8°34′26″N 77°01′16″E
- Purpose: Irrigation
- Status: Operational
- Opening date: 1972
- Owner: Kerala Water Authority

Dam and spillways
- Type of dam: Gravity dam
- Impounds: Karamana river
- Height (foundation): 14.01 m (46.0 ft)
- Length: 83.21 m (273.0 ft)
- Spillways: 6

Aruvikkara Dam (Malayalam: അരുവിക്കര അണക്കെട്ട്) is located in Aruvikkara in Thiruvananthapuram District, Kerala. This Gravity and Masonry dam was built across the Karamana River and was completed in 1972 is used for irrigation and supplying drinking water to the city of Thiruvananthapuram. The Aruvikkara dam project came up in the 1930s and has been supported by the Peppara dam built in 1983. The height of the dam is 14.01 meters (45.96 ft) and the length is 83.21 meters (273 ft). The Aruvikkara Dam meets the irrigation needs of Thiruvananthapuram. The reservoir is also one of the water tourism sites in Kerala.

== Water supply ==
The Aruvikkara Dam was built to provide a supply of piped water to the city. The Trivandrum Water Works was founded in 1933 and named after Lord Willingdon, the Viceroy and Governor-General of India; the company has been responsible for supply and distribution of water from the Karamana River ever since. Water is pumped from the Aruvikkara reservoir after treatment to the observatory tank which is in a highest plane in the city. This together with a new plant supplies water to the central zone of the city. Another new plant with its overhead tank in Peroorkada supplies water to the elevated areas of the city such as Peroorkada, Ulloor and Medical College.

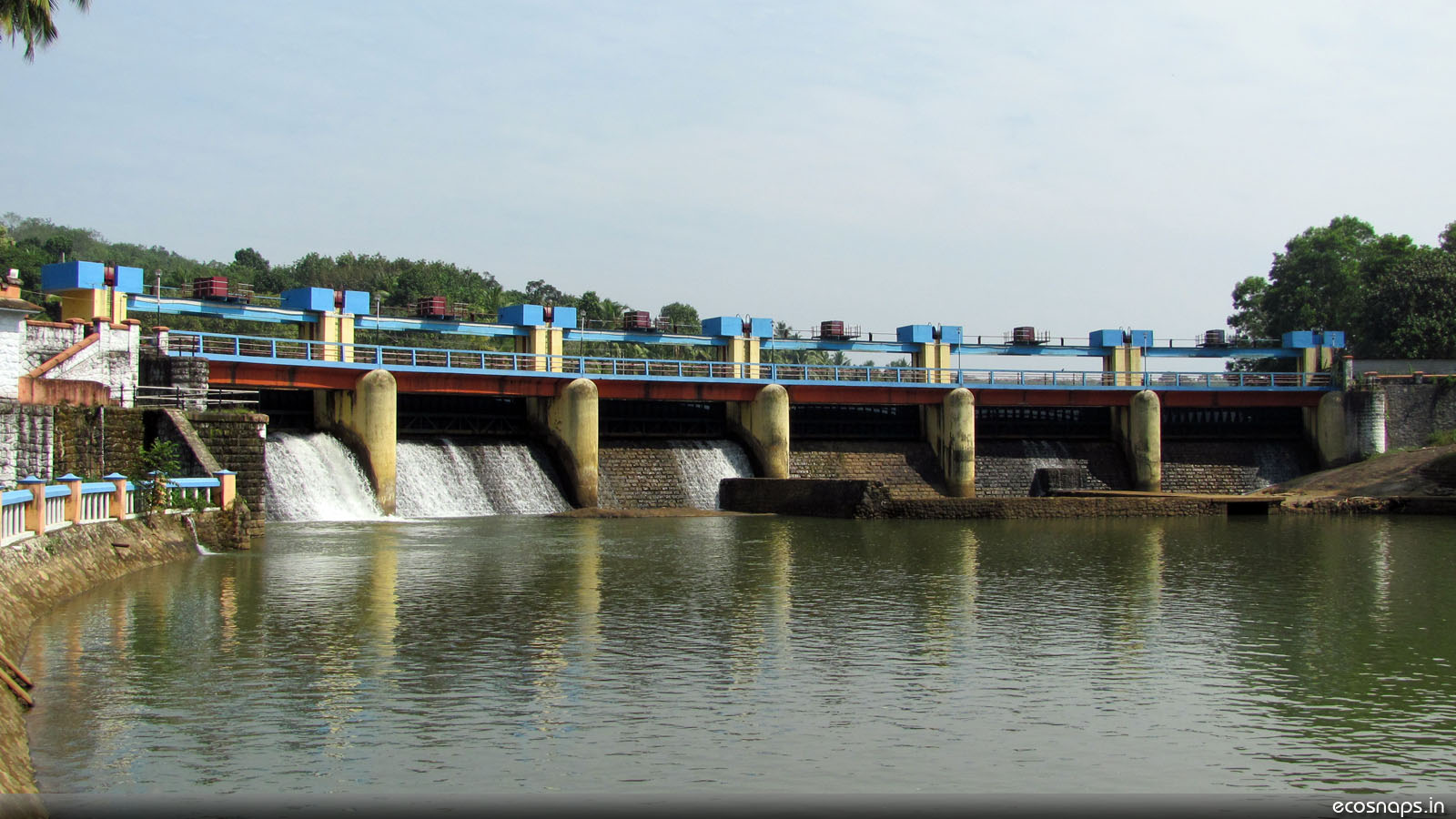
Aruvikkara Dam with its shutters opened

Recently a bottling plant was established on the shores of the Aruvikkara dam utilizing water from the Reservoir. This project is from Kerala Irrigation Infrastructure development corporation ltd. (KIIDC) After different stages of water filtration and treatments the water is bottled for consumption.

== Tourism ==
The site of the dam is a picnic spot.
