= Vembayam =

- village
- Location in Kerala, India Vembayam (India)
- Coordinates: 8.6068°N 76.9257°E
- Country: India
- State: Kerala
- District: Thiruvananthapuram
- Talukas: Nedumangad

Government
  - Body: Gram panchayat

Population (2011)
  - Total: 20,716

Languages
  - Official: Malayalam, English
- Time zone: UTC+5:30 (IST)
- PIN: 695615
- Vehicle registration: KL-21

Vembayam is a village in Thiruvananthapuram district in the state of Kerala, India.

== Location ==
Vembayam is located on Main Central Road, at a distance of 21 km from Thiruvananthapuram. It comes under Nedumangad Taluk. Nearest airport is Thiruvananthapuram International Airport and railway station is Thiruvananthapuram central Railway station. Vembayam is surrounded by two Grama panchayath Vembayam and Manikkal, East by Pothencode, West by Nedumangad municipality and South by Karakulam . Kerala State Road Transport Corporation operates a bus mini terminal at Vembayam jn. It is well connected to all parts of the state by state road transport buses. Pirappancode International Swimming Pool and Thampuran Para are located here.

== Demographics and economy ==
As of 2011 India census, Vembayam had a population of 20716 with 9905 males and 10811 females. Traditionally Agriculture are the economic activities of people. Agricultural industry also played a vital role. Vembayam was an ideal place for Rice farming and rubber plantations. Rice is the staple food of the people of Vembayam, and, traditionally, the cultivation of rice has occupied pride of place in the agrarian economy of the Panchayath. The lush green of paddy fields is one of the most captivating features of Vembayam's landscape. But gradually reduced to the agricultural land. As per the data Vembayam is thick with rubber plantations. The entire paddy fields were converted into housing colonies.

== Schools ==
There are a number of Public and Private schools in Vembayam.

- Gvt.HS Kanniakulangara
- Gvt. HSS Neduveli
- Gvt.LPS Kanniakulangara
- Gvt.LPS Thekkada
- New UP School Cheeranikkara
- Gvt.LPS Cheeranikkara
- Gvt. UPS Konchira
- St Thomas Vembayam
- Gvt. UP School Konchira
- Gvt.LPS Punkumoodu
- Gvt.LPS Nannattukavu
- Lourdes Mount Higher Secondary School Vattappara
- Lourdes Mount Public School Vattappara
- Govt.LPS Kuttiyani

== Notable personalities ==
- K. P. A. C. Azeez, Malayalam Film actor
- Vembayam Thampi, Malayalam Film actor
- KG Kunjukrishnapillai, Ex MLA
- KP kesavan Nair Former president Vempayam GramaPanchayat

== Major political organizations ==
- Indian National Congress (i)
- Communist Party of India ( CPI)
- Communist Party of India (Marxist)
- Social Democratic Party of India(
- Bharatiya Janatha Party
- Indian Union Muslim League (IUML)
- Shiv Sena
- Kerala Congress (M)
- PDP
- All India Youth Federation (AlYF)
- Democratic Youth Federation of India (DYFI)
- All India Students Federation (AISF)
- Students Federation of India
- Indian Youth Congress (i)
- RSS
- Kerala Students Union (KSU)
- Muslim Youth League (MYL)
- Muslim Student's Federation (MSF)
- Bharatiya Janatha Yuva Morcha
