= Vellanad =

- village
- Location in Kerala, India
- Coordinates: 8°33′51″N 77°03′16″E
- Country: India
- State: Kerala
- District: Thiruvananthapuram
- Talukas: Nedumangad

Population (2011)
  - Total: 28,667

Languages
  - Official: Malayalam, English
- Time zone: UTC+5:30 (IST)
- PIN: 695543
- Vehicle registration: KL-21

Vellanad is a village in the Nedumangad Taluk district of Thiruvananthapuram district in the state of Kerala, India.

== Demographics ==
As of 2011 India census, Vellanad had a population of 28,667 with 13,923 males and 14,744 females.

== Notable people ==
- Manoj Vellanad – Neurosurgeon, short story writer, and science communicator in Malayalam.
- Vellanad Ramachandran – Historian and author known for documenting Kerala’s socio-cultural narratives.

== Education ==
- G.Karthikeyan Smaraka Govt. Model V HSS

== Religion ==
Vellanad Bhagavathy Temple

- Kootayanimoodu Chamundi Temple
