= Pullampara =

- village
- Location in Kerala, India Pullampara (India)
- Coordinates: 8.6976°N 76.9582°E
- Country: India
- State: Kerala
- District: Thiruvananthapuram
- Talukas: Nedumangad

Government
  - Body: Gram panchayat

Population (2011)
  - Total: 21,817

Languages
  - Official: Malayalam, English
- Time zone: UTC+5:30 (IST)
- PIN: 695607
- Vehicle registration: KL-21

Pullampara is a village, near Thiruvananthapuram city in Thiruvananthapuram district in the state of Kerala, India. it is India's first fully digital literate panchayat.

== Demographics ==
As of 2011 India census, Pullampara had a population of 21817 with 10111 males and 11706 females. There are so many arts and sports clubs situated in Pullampara.

== Achievements ==
Pullampara grama panchayat recently finished ‘Digi Pullampara’, a campaign to ensure total digital literacy among the people of the panchayat.The panchayat trained around 4,500 people from fifteen wards of around age group from 14 to 65.Now Pullampara has been selected as India's first fully digital literate panchayat.

== Attractions ==
The main attractions of this place are Meenmood waterfalls, Vengamala Devi Temple and Louis view point etc:- Also this place has a small public stadium near Pullampara Krishi bhavan.
