= Karakulam =

- Village
- Location in Kerala, India Karakulam (India)
- Coordinates: 8.5553600°N 76.9813100°E
- Country: India
- State: Kerala
- District: Thiruvananthapuram
- Talukas: Nedumangad

Government
  - Body: Gram panchayat

Area
  - Total: 25.10 km^{2} (9.69 sq mi)

Population (2011)
  - Total: 29,624
  - Density: 1,180/km^{2} (3,057/sq mi)

Languages
  - Official: Malayalam, English
- Time zone: UTC+5:30 (IST)
- PIN: 695564
- Vehicle registration: KL-21

Karakulam is a panchayat in Nedumangad Taluk in Thiruvananthapuram District in the state of Kerala, India.

== Location ==
Karakulam is located approximately 12km. from the closest major city, Thiruvananthapuram. The Karakulam Panchayat neighbours the Thiruvananthapuram Corporation. It lies on Thiruvananthapuram–Sengottai road. The nearest town is Nedumangadu, which is approximately 6km away.

== Transport ==
There are good transportation facilities from the city, with State Transport buses plying through this village frequently en route to Nedumangadu, Vithura, Ponmudi and various other places. The nearest railway station and airport are Thiruvananthapuram Central Railway Station (11 km) and Trivandrum International Airport (15 km).

== Demographics ==
As of 2011 India census, Karakulam had a population of 29624 with 14420 males and 15204 females.

== Locations of religious significance ==
There are many temples, churches and mosques in the village. Among these are Vadakkedam (Enikkara) Shiva Temple, Thekkedam Vishnu Temple, Mudisasthamcodu Devi temple (Aaraamkallu), Pathiyanadu Sree Bhadrakali Temple, Karakulam devi temple, Ayanikkadu Mudippura Temple, Kailasapuram Sri Mahadeva Temple, Moodisasthamkode Temple, Thirumanoor Sri Mahadeva Temple, Karakulam Muslim Jama'ath (mosque), St Joseph’s Church and St Augustine’s Church (Aruvikkara).

=== Mudisasthamcodu Devi temple ===
The Mudisasthamcodu Devi temple is the only one with all the seven mother goddess in single stone idol (saptamaathru prathistha, സപ്തമാതൃ പ്രതിഷ്ട ) in Kerala. It is located at Aaraamkallu, approximately 1.5 kilometers from Karakulam and 9 kilometers from Thiruvananthapuram central. The temple is located on the banks of Killi river. The "vavu bali" is one of the major function, other than the annual festival celebration during "vrishchikam".

=== Pathiyanadu Sree Bhadrakali Temple ===
The Pathiyanadu Sree Bhadrakali Temple is a highly revered shrine in Kerala. It is located in Mullassery, approximately 1.5 kilometres (0.93 miles) from Karakulam. It is 12.5 kilometres (7.8 miles) from Thiruvananthapuram. The temple is managed by Pathiyanadu Sree Bhadrakali Kshetram Trust.

== Tesla Pedagogy Park ==
The Tesla Pedagogy Park is an educational endeavour that promotes science and technology, providing a place for school children to observe and perform experiments.
