= Venganoor =

- Neighbourhood
- Location in Kerala, India Venganoor (India)
- Coordinates: 8.396430°N 77.003350°E
- Country: India
- State: Kerala
- District: Thiruvananthapuram

Government
  - Type: Corporation
  - Body: Thiruvananthapuram Corporation

Languages
  - Official: Malayalam, English
- Time zone: UTC+5:30 (IST)
- PIN: 695523
- Vehicle registration: KL-20
- Nearest city: Thiruvananthapuram
- Lok Sabha constituency: Thiruvananthapuram
- Climate: moderate (Köppen)

Venganoor is an area within the Thiruvananthapuram City of Kerala, India, which is situated 13 km south of the city. It is known as the birthplace of Ayyankali, the great Dalit leader of Kerala. Venganoor is located near Vizhinjam where an international trans-shipment port is being built. Venganoor is one of the border divisions of Thiruvananthapuram corporation.

Mekkumkara Sree Neelakeshi Mudippura a temple dedicated to goddess Bhadrakali is situated in Venganoor. The temple is famous for Paranettu maholsavam, which may lasts for months and conducted in every 6 years. The temple is also known for kalamkaaval which is attended by a huge number of pilgrims.

Venganoor has its own place in the history books as it is the birthplace of legendaryAyyankali a social reformer who worked for the advancement of deprived untouchable people in the princely state of Travancore. Mahatma Ayyankali Smarakam is also situated in Venganoor.

Venganoor pillai, of Ettuveetil Pillamar who were nobles from eight Nair Houses in erstwhile Travancore lived here.
