= Manikkal =

- village
- Location in Kerala, India Manikkal (India)
- Coordinates: 8.6543900°N 76.9090400°E
- Country: India
- State: Kerala
- District: Thiruvananthapuram
- Talukas: Nedumangad

Government
  - Body: Gram panchayat

Population (2011)
  - Total: 18,632

Languages
  - Official: Malayalam
- Time zone: UTC+5:30 (IST)
- PIN: 695607
- Vehicle registration: KL-21
- Website: http://lsgkerala.in/manickalpanchayat/

Manikkal is a village in Thiruvananthapuram district in the state of Kerala, India.

== Demographics ==
As of 2011 India census, Manikkal had a population of 18632 with 8861 males and 9771 females.
