= Pothencode =

- suburb
- Location in Thiruvananthapuram, Kerala, India
- Coordinates: 8°37′08.23″N 76°53′50.99″E
- Country: India
- State: Kerala
- District: Thiruvananthapuram

Languages
  - Official: Malayalam, English
- Time zone: UTC+5:30 (IST)
- PIN: 695584
- Telephone code: +91 471
- Vehicle registration: KL- 22
- Nearest city: Thiruvananthapuram
- Lok Sabha constituency: Attingal

Pothencode is a rapidly developing business town, northern suburb of Trivandrum city and a developing commercial area of Thiruvananthapuram District in the Indian state of Kerala. Pothencode is one of the 12 panchayats that shares a border with Trivandrum City Corporation. Spiritual leaders Swami Sathyananda Saraswathi, Sree Rama Dasa Mission, and founder of Punnyabhumi Daily hail from a village called Panimoola which is just 2 kilometres (1 mi) from Pothencode.

Pothencode is 18 km (11 mi) from East Fort.

It is included in Pothencode Grama Panchayat and Kazhakkoottam Block.

== Temples ==
Panimoola Temple is two km (1.2 mi) from Pothencode. Ariyottukonam Temple is one km (0.62 mi) from Pothencode. Rock cut temples are one of the main styles of Kerala architecture from the 7th to 9th centuries AD. This cave temple is found at the mid-height of the rock, facing south west. It has an oblong shrine, with rock-cut lingam, an ardhamandapa and pillared facade. There is a circular walkway inside the garbhagriha. The left wall of the ardhamondapa carries a Ganapathy figure and the right side is a local chieftain. The temple is dated to about 850 AD. The Department of Archaeology declared this temple a protected monument in 1965.

== Politics ==
Communist Party of India (CPI) Marxist is the ruling party. In the year 2016 Assembly election C.Divakaran got a lead of 700+ votes from this panchayat. TR Anil is the panchayat President. Pothencode Grama panchayath is under Nedumangad Assembly Constituency.

- Indian National Congress
- Communist Party of India (CPI) and Communist Party of India (Marxist)
- Bharathiya Janatha Party

== Surroundings ==
Karoor is the nearest place where two temples, one high school, and two sports and arts clubs are situated. Mahadeva Temple Karoor, Maha Vishnu temple are the ancient temples situated here. Pradhosha Vrrath and Somavara Vratha and Ayillya are the special poojas.

Murukkumpuzha is a tourist destination surrounded by lake that has the Perumathura sea as its water source.

== Religion ==
Pothencode is a mixed village, accommodating Hindus, Muslims and Christians

== Education ==
- Govt Higher Secondary School Ayiroopara
- Lekshmi Vilasom High School
- St.Thomas UPS Pothencode
- St.Thomas LPS Pothencode
- Govt UPS
- Eiswara Vilasom UPS Koithoorkonam
- Govt UPS Kalloor
- Govt LPS Kalloor
- NCSU
- Pothencode Public Library
- E-pro, Academy of Engineering
- Santhigiri Vidyabhavan HSS & SSS
- Nizamia public school
- Mary Matha English Medium School
- Sabarigiri International school
- Motherland English Medium School

== Govt Offices ==
- Sub Registrar Office, Pothencode
