= Aruvikkara =

- Suburb
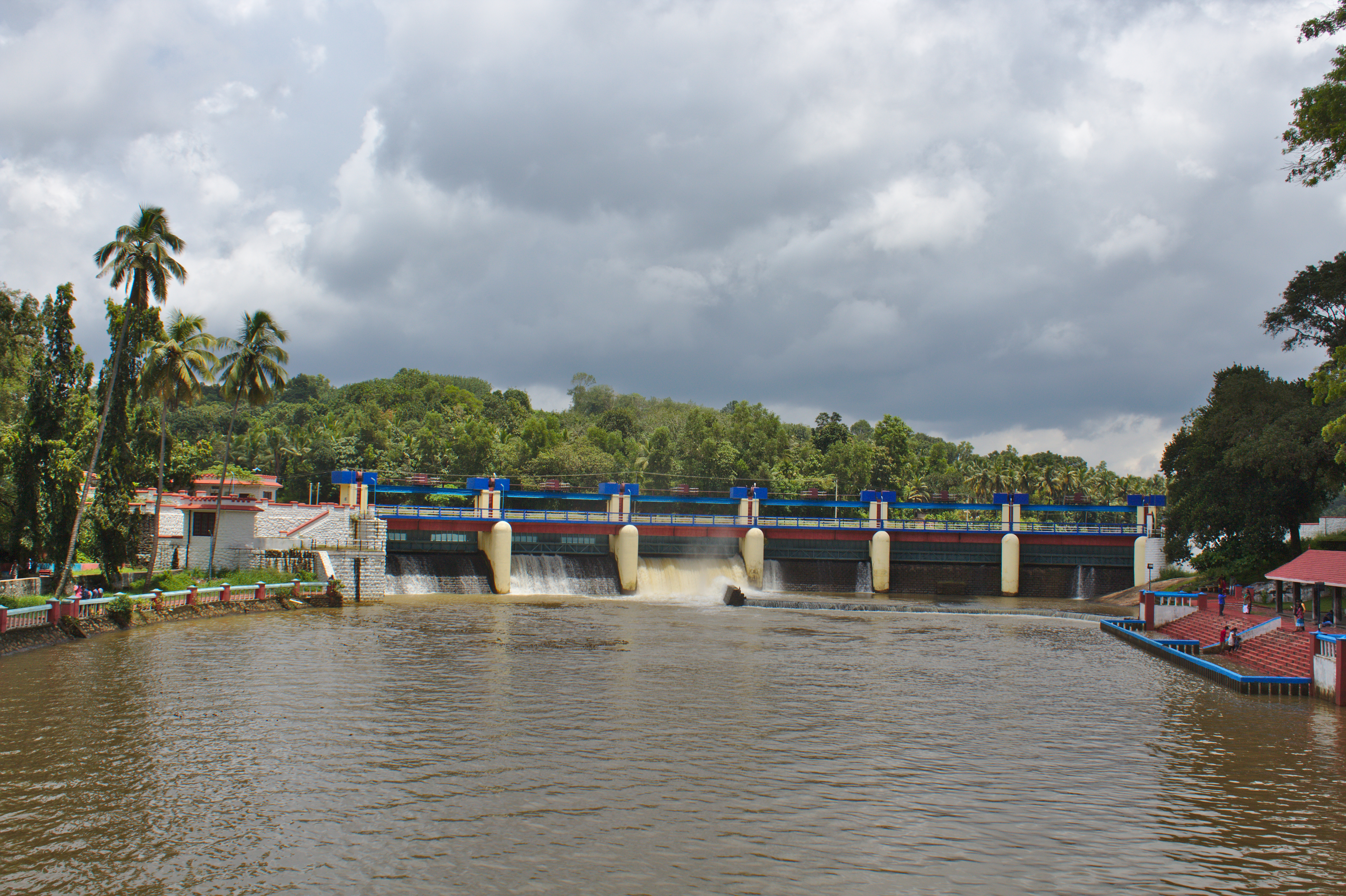
- Aruvikara Dam

- Location in Kerala, India Aruvikkara (India)
- Coordinates: 8°34′N 77°01′E
- Country: India
- State: Kerala
- District: Thiruvananthapuram
- Established(build in): 1930s
- Named for: region of the place
- Talukas: Nedumangad

Government
  - Body: Gram panchayat

Area
  - Total: 21.86 km^{2} (8.44 sq mi)

Population (2011)
  - Total: 33,909
  - Density: 1,551/km^{2} (4,018/sq mi)

Languages
  - Official: Malayalam, English
- Time zone: UTC+5:30 (IST)
- PIN: 695564
- Vehicle registration: KL-21

Aruvikkara is a panchayat in Thiruvananthapuram district in the state of Kerala India. It is located on the banks of the Karamana River, 15 km from Thiruvananthapuram.

Aruvikkara is the capital of the state of Kerala in South India and one of the 12 panchayats that shares border with Thiruvananthapuram Municipal Corporation. The reservoir and garden are popular tourist spots.

It is known for the ancient Bhagavathi temple which is built on a rock and is dedicated to Durga, the divine embodiment of female power. The stream in front of the temple contains large fish, which are fed by devotees visiting the shrine.

The headquarters of the Wellington Water Distribution project is located in Avuvikkara. The mini Aruvikkara Dam provides water to the state capital Thiruvananthapuram.

== Transportation ==
The Kerala State Road Transport Corporation (KSRTC) is the state-run bus company in Kerala, India. It is one of the oldest state run public bus transport services in India and is headquartered in Thiruvananthapuram. KSRTC bus is the only mode of Transportation available in Aruvikkara.

== Demographics ==
As of 2011 India census, Aruvikkara had a population of 33909 with 16427 males and 17482 females.

== Politics ==
G.Stephen (ജി .സ്റ്റീഫൻ ) is the (current) sitting MLA of Aruvikkara.

== Gallery ==
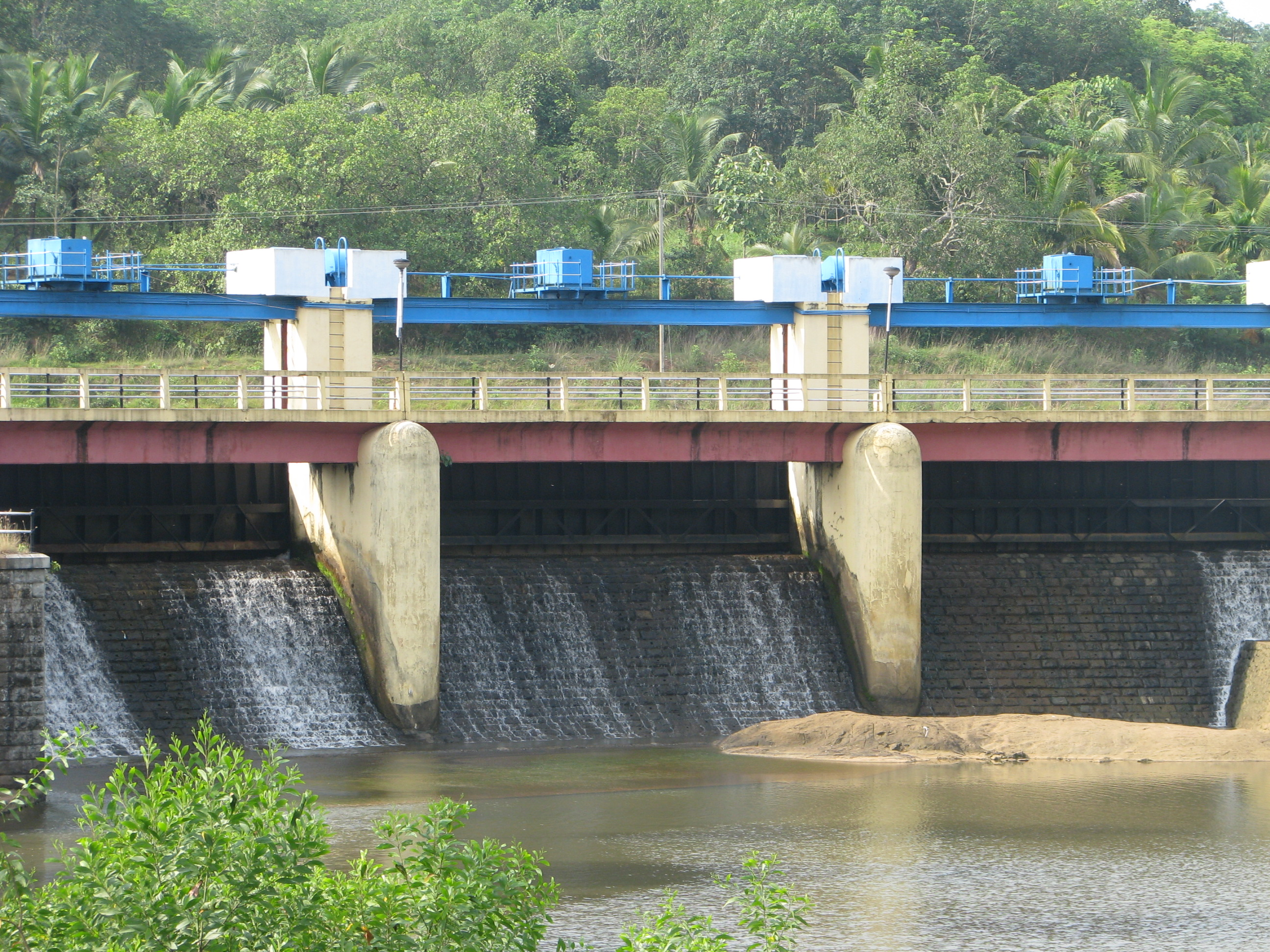
Aruvikara Dam (closer view)

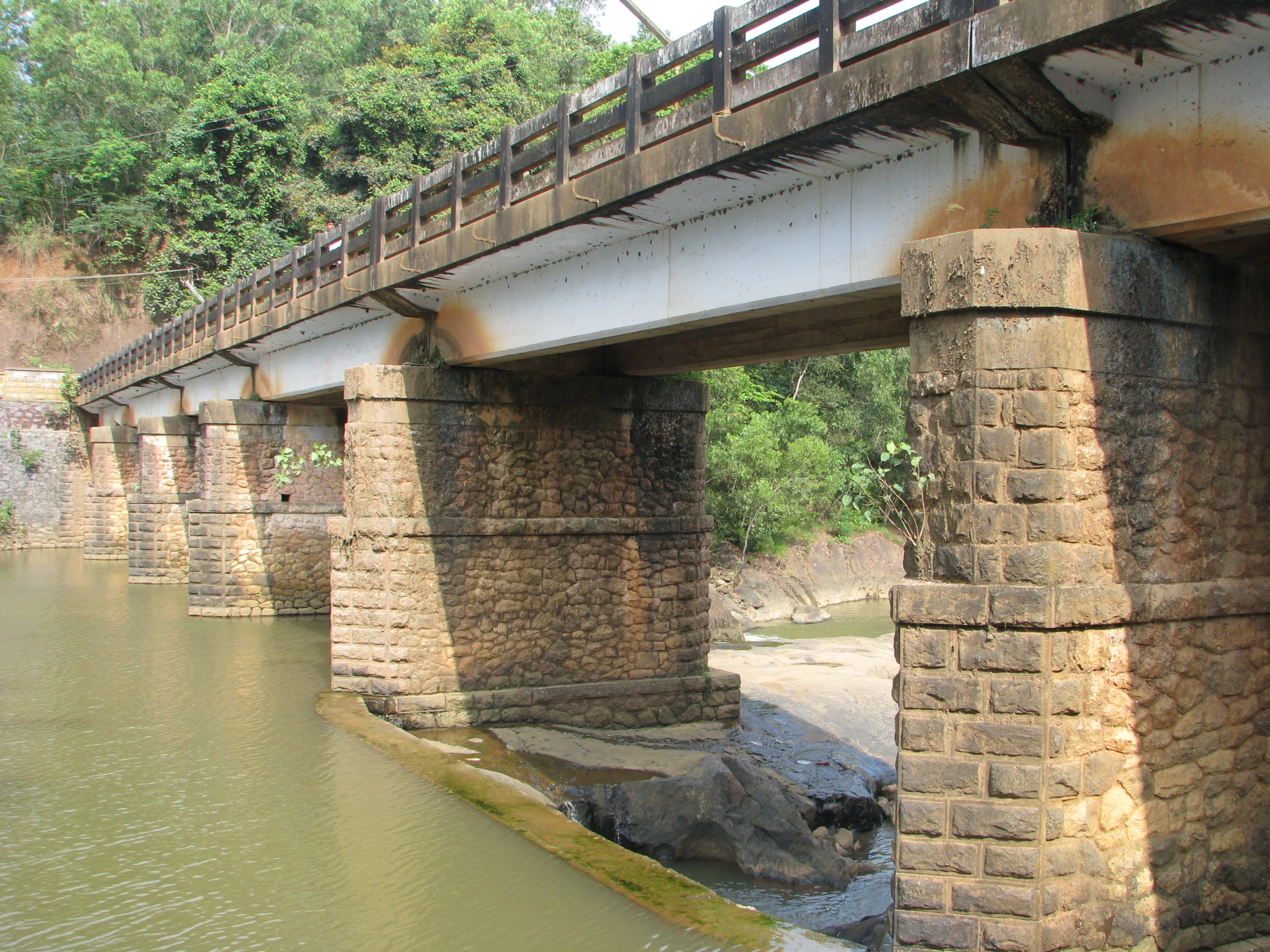
Bridge at Aruvikara

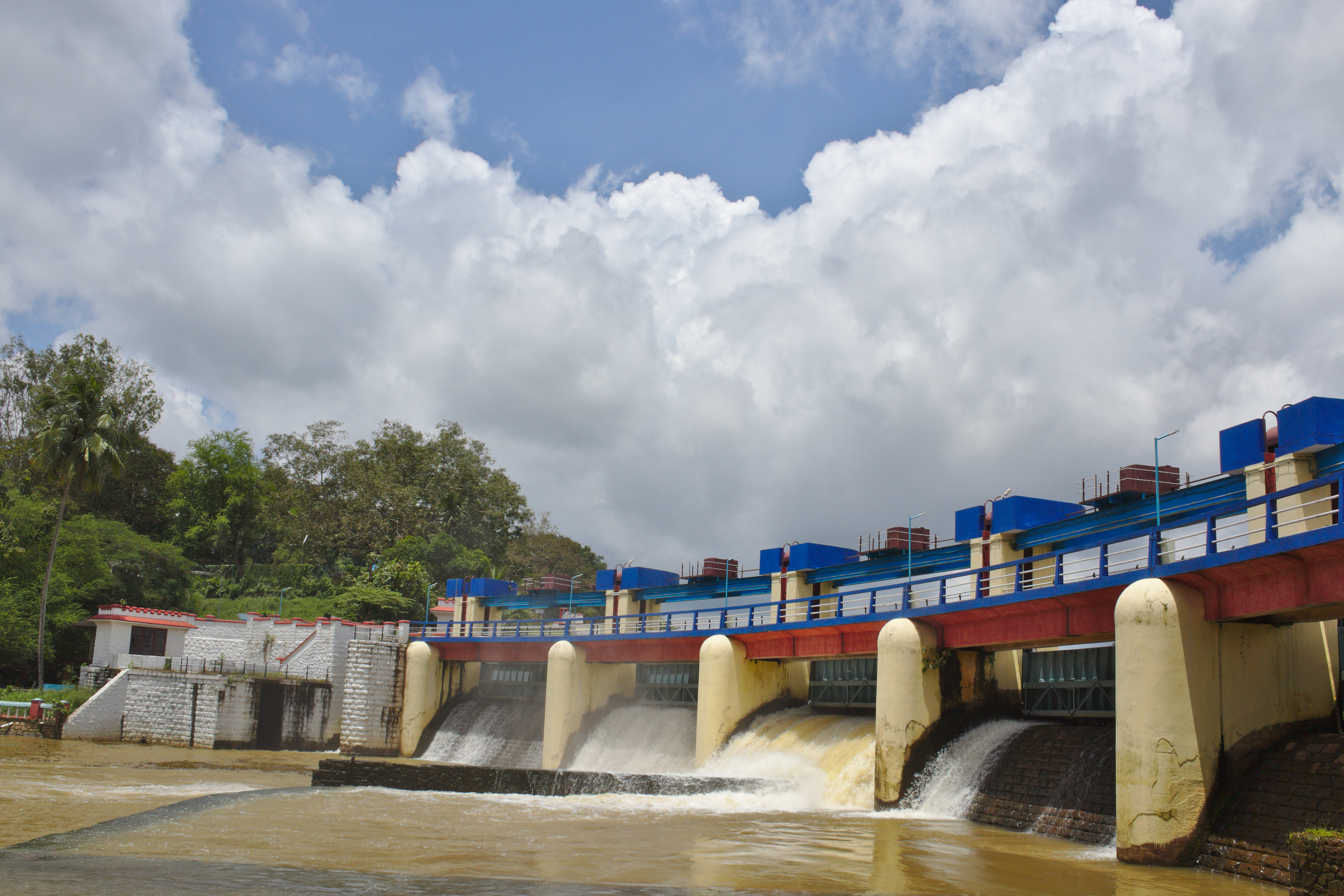
Aruvikkara Dam

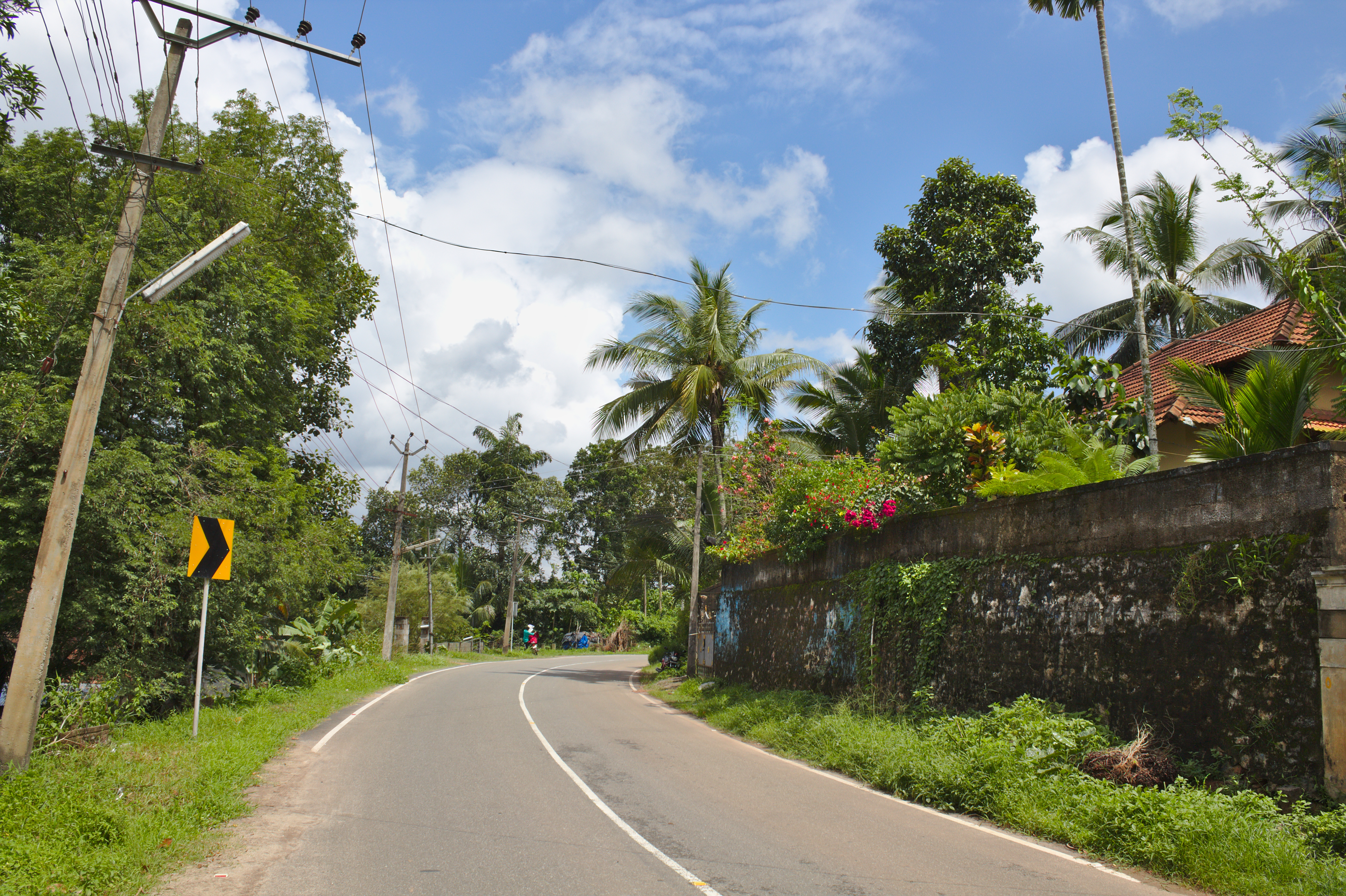
Street at Aruvikkara

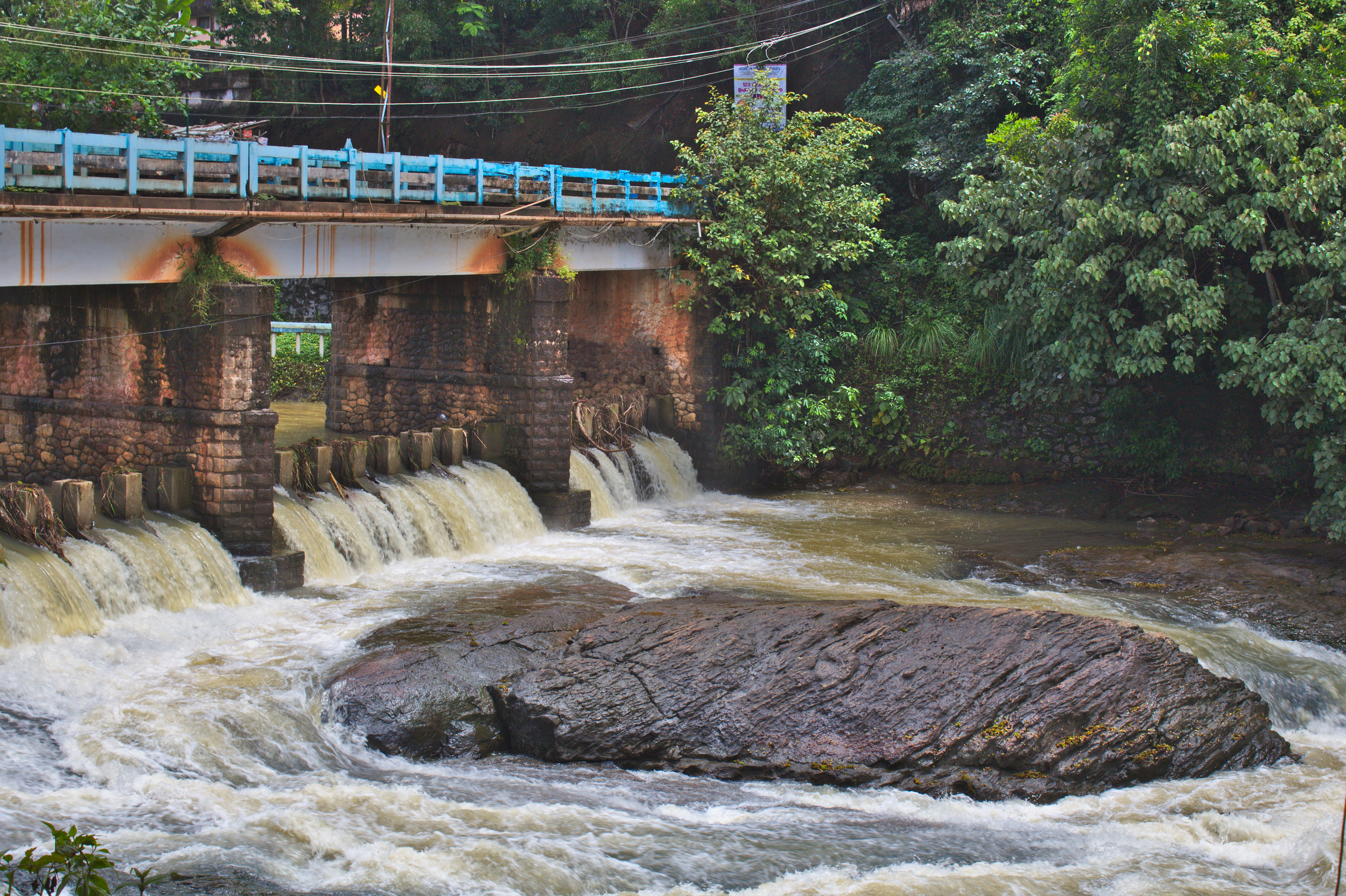
Karamana River Bridge, Aruvikkara
