= Varkala Assembly constituency =

Constituency of the Kerala legislative assembly in India

Varkala
- Constituency No. 127 for the Kerala Legislative Assembly

Constituency details
- Country: India
- Region: South India
- State: Kerala
- District: Thiruvananthapuram
- Lok Sabha constituency: Attingal
- Established: 1957
- Total electors: 1,87,646 (2021)
- Reservation: None

Member of Legislative Assembly
- 16th Kerala Legislative Assembly
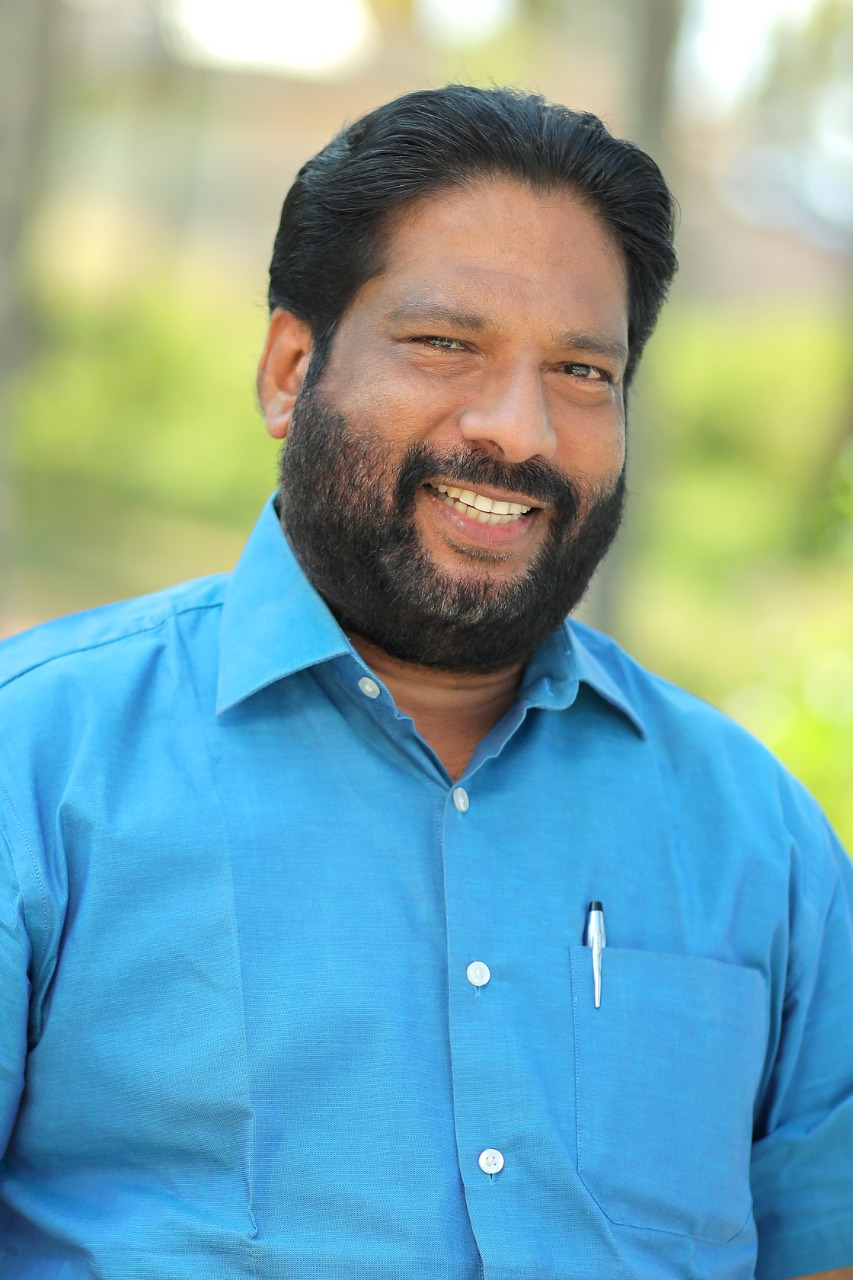
- Incumbent V. Joy
- Party: CPI(M)
- Alliance: LDF
- Elected year: 2026

Varkala State assembly constituency is one of the 140 state legislative assembly constituencies in Kerala in southern India. It is also one of the seven state legislative assembly constituencies included in Attingal Lok Sabha constituency. As of the 2026 Assembly elections, the current MLA is V. Joy of CPI(M).

== Local self-governed segments ==
Varkala Assembly constituency is composed of the following local self-governed segments:

| Sl no. | Name | Status (Grama panchayat/Municipality) | Taluk |
|---|---|---|---|
| 1 | Varkala | Municipality | Varkala |
| 2 | Chemmaruthy | Grama panchayat | Varkala |
| 3 | Edava | Grama panchayat | Varkala |
| 4 | Elakamon | Grama panchayat | Varkala |
| 5 | Madavoor | Grama panchayat | Varkala |
| 6 | Navaikulam | Grama panchayat | Varkala |
| 7 | Pallickal | Grama panchayat | Varkala |
| 8 | Vettoor | Grama panchayat | Varkala |

== Members of Legislative Assembly ==
The following list contains all members of Kerala Legislative Assembly who have represented the constituency:

| Year | Member | Party |
|---|---|---|
| 1957 | T. Abdul Majeed | Communist Party of India |
| 1957 | K. Sivadasan | Communist Party of India |
| 1960 | Balakrishnan | Communist Party of India |
| 1960 | Shamsuddin | Indian National Congress |
| 1967 | T. Abdul Majeed | Communist Party of India |
| 1970 | T. Abdul Majeed | Communist Party of India |
| 1977 | T. Abdul Majeed | Communist Party of India |
| 1980 | Varkala Radhakrishnan | Communist Party of India (Marxist) |
| 1982 | Varkala Radhakrishnan | Communist Party of India (Marxist) |
| 1987 | Varkala Radhakrishnan | Communist Party of India (Marxist) |
| 1991 | Varkala Radhakrishnan | Communist Party of India (Marxist) |
| 1996 | A. Ali Hassan | Communist Party of India (Marxist) |
| 2001 | Varkala Kahar | Indian National Congress |
| 2006 | Varkala Kahar | Indian National Congress |
| 2011 | Varkala Kahar | Indian National Congress |
| 2016 | V. Joy | Communist Party of India (Marxist) |
| 2021 | V. Joy | Communist Party of India (Marxist) |
| 2026 | V. Joy | Communist Party of India (Marxist) |

== Election results ==
Percentage change (±%) denotes the change in the number of votes from the immediate previous election.

=== 2026 ===
2026 Kerala Legislative Assembly election: Varkala
| Party | Candidate | Votes | % | ±% |
|---|---|---|---|---|
| CPI(M) | V. Joy | 55,365 | 40.05% | ▼11.53 |
| INC | Varkala Kahar | 53,315 | 38.57% | ▲0.86 |
| BJP | Adv. Smitha Sundaresan | 27,400 | 19.82% | ▲9.46 |
| BSP | Raju S Kottarakonam | 949 | 0.69 | |
| NOTA | None of the Above | 652 | 0.49 | |
| Margin of victory | | 2050 | | |
| Turnout | | 138231 | | |
| CPI(M) hold | | Swing | | |

=== 2021 ===
There were 1,87,646 registered voters in the constituency for the 2021 election.

2021 Kerala Legislative Assembly election: Varkala
| Party | Candidate | Votes | % | ±% |
|---|---|---|---|---|
| CPI(M) | V. Joy | 68,816 | 50.89 | ▲9.46 |
| INC | Adv. B. R. M. Shafeer | 50,995 | 37.71 | ▼1.86 |
| BDJS | Aji S | 11,214 | 8.29 | ▼7.21 |
| BSP | Anu M.C | 1,948 | 1.44 | ▼0.03 |
| NOTA | None of the above | 815 | 0.6 | ▲0.11 |
| Independent | Prince | 658 | 0.49 | |
| Democratic Human Rights Movement Party | Anilkumar P | 460 | 0.34 | |
| Independent | Shefeer | 323 | 0.24 | |
| Margin of victory | | 17,821 | 13.18 | ▲11.32 |
| Turnout | | 1,35,229 | 72.06 | ▲0.52 |
| CPI(M) hold | | Swing | ▲9.46 | |

=== 2016 ===
There were 1,79,160 registered voters in the constituency for the 2016 election.

2016 Kerala Legislative Assembly election: Varkala
| Party | Candidate | Votes | % | ±% |
|---|---|---|---|---|
| CPI(M) | V. Joy | 53,102 | 41.43 | ▼1.25 |
| INC | Varkala Kahar | 50,716 | 39.57 | ▼12.83 |
| BDJS | Aji S. R. M. | 19,872 | 15.50 | |
| BSP | Varkala P. Linees | 1,888 | 1.47 | |
| NOTA | None of the above | 628 | 0.49 | |
| SDPI | Abdul Salam | 466 | 0.36 | ▼0.36 |
| Independent | Sunil Kumar S. | 357 | 0.28 | |
| Independent | Sudevan | 351 | 0.27 | |
| PDP | Nadayara Jabbar | 297 | 0.23 | |
| Independent | Bhasidharan Nair | 138 | 0.11 | |
| Independent | Salu R. | 135 | 0.11 | |
| Independent | Varkala Sabesan | 126 | 0.10 | |
| Independent | Vivekanandan | 101 | 0.08 | |
| Margin of victory | | 2,386 | 1.86 | |
| Turnout | | 1,28,177 | 71.54 | ▼1.01 |
| CPI(M) gain from INC | | Swing | | |

=== 2011 ===
There were 1,51,930 registered voters in the constituency for the 2011 election.

2011 Kerala Legislative Assembly election: Varkala
| Party | Candidate | Votes | % | ±% |
|---|---|---|---|---|
| INC | Varkala Kahar | 57,775 | 52.40 | |
| CPI(M) | A.A RAHEEM | 47,045 | 42.68 | |
| BJP | Elakaman Satheesan | 3,430 | 3.11 | |
| Independent | Cherunniyoor Ganesh | 927 | 0.84 | |
| SDPI | Kunnil Shahjahan | 795 | 0.72 | |
| Independent | Aneesh Kumar | 275 | 0.25 | |
| Margin of victory | | 10,710 | 9.72 | |
| Turnout | | 1,10,227 | 72.55 | |
| INC hold | | Swing | | |

=== 2006 ===
2006 Kerala Legislative Assembly election: Varkala
| Party | Candidate | Votes | % | ±% |
|---|---|---|---|---|
| INC | Varkala Kahar | 44,883 | 48.78 | |
| CPI(M) | S Sundaresan | 43,258 | 47.01 | |
| Margin of victory | | 1,625 | 1.77 | |
| Turnout | | 92,002 | | |
| INC hold | | Swing | | |

=== 2001 ===
2001 Kerala Legislative Assembly election: Varkala
| Party | Candidate | Votes | % | ±% |
|---|---|---|---|---|
| INC | Varkala Kahar | 45,315 | 48.90 | |
| CPI(M) | P K Gurudasan | 43,327 | 46.75 | |
| Margin of victory | | 1,988 | 2.15 | |
| Turnout | | 92,678 | 66.94 | |
| INC gain from CPI(M) | | Swing | | |

== See also ==
- Varkala
- Thiruvananthapuram district
- List of constituencies of the Kerala Legislative Assembly
- 2016 Kerala Legislative Assembly election
