= Thiruvananthapuram Taluk =

- Taluk
- Location in Kerala, India Thiruvananthapuram Taluk (India)
- Coordinates: 08.5069°N 76.9569°E
- Country: India
- State: Kerala
- District: Thiruvananthapuram
- Headquarters: Thiruvananthapuram

Government
  - Type: public

Area
  - Total: 307.55 km^{2} (118.75 sq mi)
  - Rank: 3

Population (2011)
  - Total: 1,140,845
  - Rank: 1
  - Density: 3,709.5/km^{2} (9,607.5/sq mi)
- Demonym: Trivandrumkaran

Languages
  - Official: Malayalam, English
- Time zone: UTC+5:30 (IST)
- Vehicle registration: KL-01 & KL-22

Thiruvananthapuram Taluk is a Taluk (tehsil) in Thiruvananthapuram district in the Indian state of Kerala. It is the most populous taluk in the district and one of the most populous in Kerala. It is situated in the western part of the Thiruvananthapuram district.

== Settlements ==
There are thirty-one villages and one Municipal Corporation in this taluk.

=== Villages ===
Andoorkonam, Attipra, Cheruvakkal, Iroopara (Ayiroopara), Kadakampally, Kadinamkulam, Kalliyoor, Kazhakoottam, Keezhthonnakkal, Kowdiar, Kudappanakunnu, Manacaud, Melthonnakkal, Menamkulam, Muttathara, Nemom, Pallippuram, Pangappara, Pattom, Peroorkada, Pettah, Sasthamangalam, Thirumala (not Tirumala Tirupathi), Thiruvallam, Thycaud, Uliyazhathura, Ulloor, Vanchiyoor, Vattiyoorkavu, Veiloor, Venganoor.
