= Kallambalam =

- Town
- Location in Kerala, India
- Country: India
- State: Kerala
- District: Thiruvananthapuram
- Taluk: Chirayinkeezhu Taluk (Karavaram Grama Panchayat) KL 16 Varkala Taluk (Navaikulam And Ottoor Grama Panchayats) KL 81

Government
  - Body: Karavaram, Navaikulam, Ottoor Panchayats

Languages
  - Official: Malayalam, English
- Time zone: UTC+5:30 (IST)
- PIN: 695605
- Telephone code: +91 470-XXXXXXX
- Vehicle registration: KL- 16, KL- 81
- Niyamasabha constituency: Attingal, Varkala

Kallambalam is a suburb of Varkala Town situated in Thiruvananthapuram district. Kallambalam joins Varkala with National Highway 66. It is 36 km north from state capital Trivandrum, 8.1 km East of Varkala, and 12 km West of Kilimanoor.

== Geography ==
It is located at 8°45′39″N 76°47′46″E. In recent old days there were a stone rest place like a bus stop. From this the name Kallambalam came into existence ("kall" means stone in Tamil and Malayalam). Kallambalam is situated at National Highway 66. It is the northernmost town of Thiruvananthapuram District but it does not have a local governing body. Instead, Kallambalam town came under the administrative control of three grama panchayaths. They are Ottor Grama Panchayth, Karavaram Grama Panchayath and Navaikulam Grama Panchayth.

== Location ==
Kallambalam is on the National Highway 66. It is near Varkala (8 km) and Attingal (11 km). The nearest airport is Thiruvananthapuram International Airport. Nearest Railway station is Varkala Sivagiri Railway Station. It is around 41 km north of Thiruvananthapuram City and 29 km south of Kollam City.

Kallambalam is the main commercial center between Attingal and Paripally, Kallambalam shared the border of three Grama panchayaths, Karavaram, Navaikulam and Ottoor. Nearest KSRTC Bus stand is at Attingal.

== Houses of worship ==
Changattu Sree Bhagavathy Temple, Kaduvayil Juma Masjid, Navaikulam Valiyapalli, Sri Sankaranarayana Temple Navailkulam, and Sree Ulakudayaperumal Thampuran Temple Mullaramcode are the main temples and mosques in and around Kallambalam.
