= Kadampattukonam =

Kadampattukonam കടമ്പാട്ടുകോണം
- Suburb
- Location in Kerala, India
- Coordinates: 8.797°N 76.769°E
- Country: India
- State: Kerala
- District: Thiruvananthapuram
- Taluk: Varkala Taluk

Government
  - Body: Navaikulam Panchayat

Languages
  - Official: Malayalam, English
- Time zone: UTC+05:30 (IST)
- PIN: 695605
- Telephone code: 04702
- Vehicle registration: KL-81
- Nearest city: Varkala, Thiruvananthapuram
- Niyamasabha constituency: Varkala
- Civic agency: Navaikulam
- Climate: normal (Köppen)

Kadampattukonam is a suburb of Kallambalam Town situated in Varkala Taluk of Thiruvananthapuram district, Kerala, India. It is the border of Trivandrum and Kollam district in NH 66. It is also the starting point of proposed alignment of NH744.
