= Cherunniyoor =

- village
- Location in Kerala, India Cherunniyoor (India)
- Coordinates: 8.7178°N 76.7444°E
- Country: India
- State: Kerala
- District: Thiruvananthapuram
- Talukas: Varkala

Government
  - Type: Panchayati raj (India)
  - Body: Gram panchayat

Population (2001)
  - Total: 37,219

Languages
  - Official: Malayalam, English
- Time zone: UTC+5:30 (IST)
- PIN: 695142
- Vehicle registration: KL-81

Cherunniyoor is a village in Varkala Taluk of Thiruvananthapuram district in the state of Kerala, India.It is situated 3.4km south of Varkala Town center and also one of 5 panchayats that shares border with Varkala municipality. Palachira and Vadaserikonam junctions in cheruniyoor panchayat is two of the fastest urbanizing suburbs of Varkala.

== Demographics ==
As of 2001 India census, Cherunniyoor had a population of 37219 with 17184 males and 20035 females.

The village is about 4 km to the south of Varkala, an important pilgrim centre and beach resort in Trivandrum (Thiruvananthapuram) District of the Indian state of Kerala. The village has government-run primary, upper primary and high schools, a post office, bank, agriculture office and the local panchayat (local government) offices. A substantial number of people, especially the young, are employed in the Middle East. Cherunniyoor has developed spectacularly in population and infrastructure in the late 1990s. The noted Sastha Temple is located about one kilometre from Cherunniyoor Junction. The population comprises a broad spectrum of Hindus, Muslims and a small number of Christians. Two Lower primary schools, one upper primary school and one High school and one higher Secondary School are there in the Cherunniyoor Panchayat Area. The nearest railway station is Varkala, 5 km away. Redstar is the major information and career center located in Cherunniyoor. Another famous cultural club MSSC is here at Mudiyacode, where the first Upper Primary School, St. Sebastian UPS, is also located. Moongodu lake, a branch of Anchuthengu Lake, borders the south-east of Cherunniyoor. When the Assembly constituencies were reorganised, Cherunniyoor, which hitherto had been part of Varkala Constituency, became a part of Attingal Constituency.

== Notable people ==
- Cherunniyoor Jayaprasad (born 1951), playwright and theatre director
