= Ayiroor =

Ayiroor may refer to the following locations in the Indian state of Kerala:

- Ayiroor, Thiruvananthapuram, village in Thiruvananthapuram district
- Ayiroor, Pathanamthitta, village in Pathanamthitta district
- Ayiroor, Ernakulam, village in Ernakulam district
- Ayiroor, Malappuram, village in Malappuram district
