= Madavoor =

Madavoor may refer to several places in Kerala, India:

- Madavoor, Kozhikode, a village in Kozhikode district
- Madavoor-Pallickal, Kilimanoor a village in Thiruvananthapuram district
