= Kusacode Shri Mahadeva Temple =

Kusacode Mahadeva Temple
- Major Kusacode Shree Mahadeva Temple
- Mahadeva Temple, Kusakkode, Thirumala, Thiruvananthapuram, Kerala

Religion
- Affiliation: Hinduism
- District: Thiruvananthapuram
- Deity: Shiva (Kiratha Moorthi)
- Festivals: Thrikkodiyettu Utsavam, Shivrathri

Location
- Location: Kusakkode, Thirumala
- State: Kerala
- Country: India
- Interactive map of Kusacode Mahadeva Temple
- Coordinates: 8°30′10.8″N 76°59′27.2″E

Specifications
- Temple: One
- Elevation: 67.21 m (221 ft)

The Kusacode Mahadeva Temple is a shrine in Kerala, India. The temple comes under "Major" temples listed under Travancore Devaswom Board of Kerala. The main festivals of the temple are the yearly eight-day festival known as "Thrikkodiyettu mahotsavam", Shivarathri and Thiruvathira days. The temple is considered to be one of the busiest in the district on Shivrathri day after the Sreekanteshwaram Temple.
