= Kudavoor =

- village
- Location in Kerala, India Kudavoor (India)
- Coordinates: 8°47′0″N 76°49′0″E
- Country: India
- State: Kerala
- District: Thiruvananthapuram district
- Talukas: Varkala Taluk

Government
  - Type: Panchayat
  - Body: Navaikulam Gram panchayat

Population (2011)
  - Total: 14,151

Languages
  - Official: Malayalam
- Time zone: UTC+5:30 (IST)
- PIN: 695602
- Telephone code: 0470
- Vehicle registration: KL-81
- Nearest city: Thiruvananthapuram

Kudavoor is a village in Mangalapuram panchayat of Thiruvananthapuram Taluk in Thiruvananthapuram district in the state of Kerala, India.

== Demographics ==
As of 2011 India census, Kudavoor had a population of 14151 with 6449 males and 7702 females. The famous Kudavoor Mahadevar temple and Idayavanam Temple are situated in the center of the village.
