= Muthana, Thiruvananthapuram district =

Village in Kerala, India

Coordinates: 8°46′20″N 76°45′40″E

Muthana is a small village in Trivandrum district, Kerala. The village comes under Chemmaruthy panchayat of Varkala Taluk.
