= Kazhakkoottam-Menamkulam =

Kazhakkoottam-Menamkulam was a village in Thiruvananthapuram, Kerala, India that was split in 2006 into the following entities:

- Kazhakoottam, the urban area
- Menamkulam, the industrial and coastal village
