= Muthanna =

Muthanna or Muthana or Muthenna or variant spellings may also refer to:

== People ==
=== Muthanna ===
- Al-Muthanna ibn Haritha, a Muslim Arab general in the army of the Rashidun Caliphate
- I. M. Muthanna, Indian writer, scholar and translator
- Muhammad Abdallah Muthanna (born 1945 or 1947), Yemeni writer
- Sengalipuram Muthanna (1830–1893), Hindu religious leader

=== Muthana ===
- Muthana Khalid (born 1989), Iraqi football player
- Hoda Muthana (born 1994), American member of ISIS

== Places ==
- Muthanna Governorate, or Al Muthanna Province, Iraq
- Muthana, Pali district, Rajasthan, India
- Muthana, Thiruvananthapuram district, Kerala, India
- Al-Muthana University, Iraq
- Muthenna Air Base, Iraq

== Other uses ==
- Al-Muthanna Club, an influential pan-Arab fascist society established in Baghdad ca. 1935 to 1937 which remained active until May 1941
- Muthana State Establishment, Iraqi chemical weapons facility
- Al Muthanna Task Group, Australian forces in the Multinational force in Iraq
- Islamic Muthanna Movement, a Syrian Salafist rebel group based in Daraa that had been active during Syrian Civil War

== See also ==
- Islamic Muthanna Movement, a Syrian Salafist rebel group
- Mayor Muthanna, 1969 Indian Kannada-language film
