= Thiruvananthapuram district =

District in Kerala, India

- District of Kerala
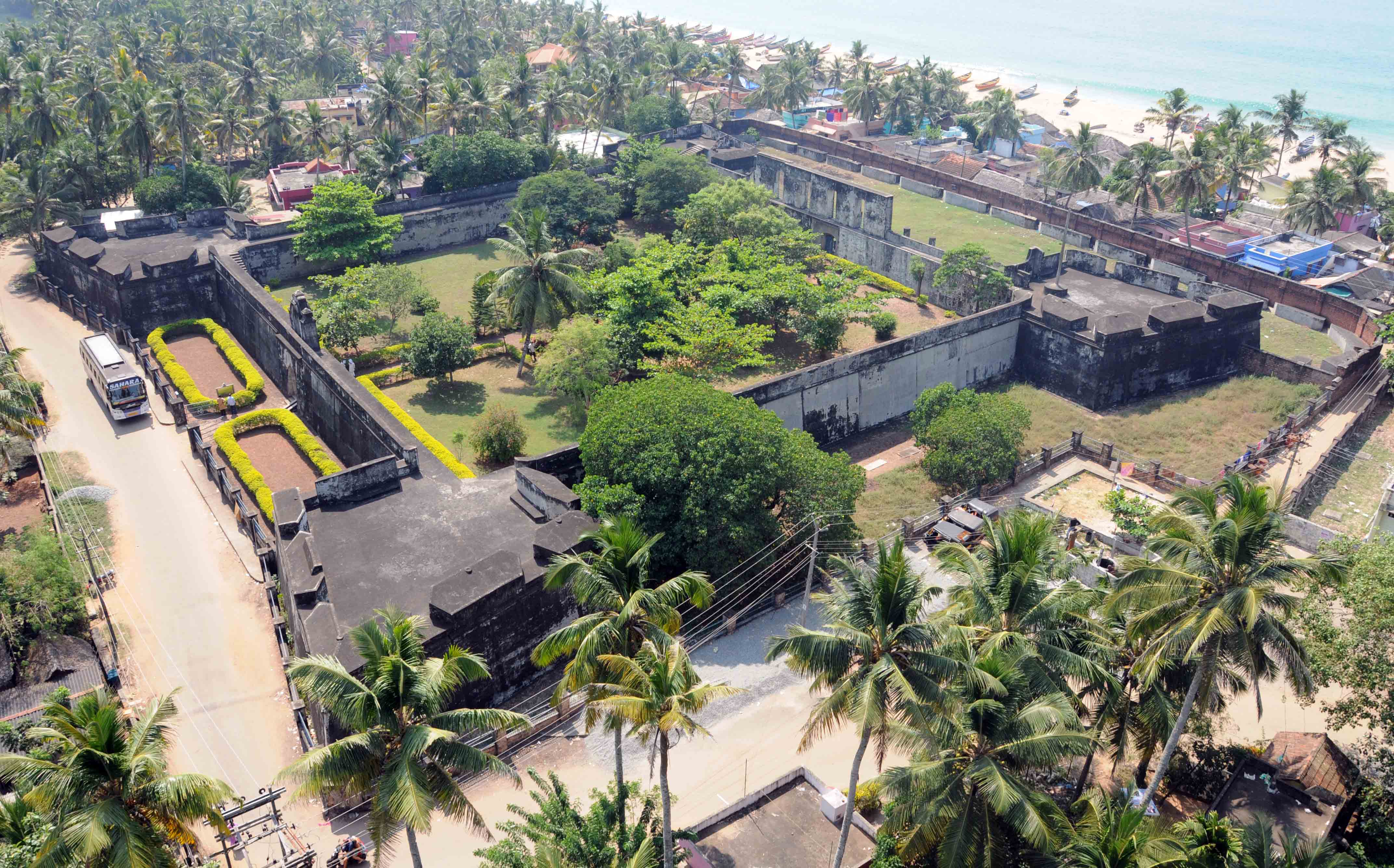
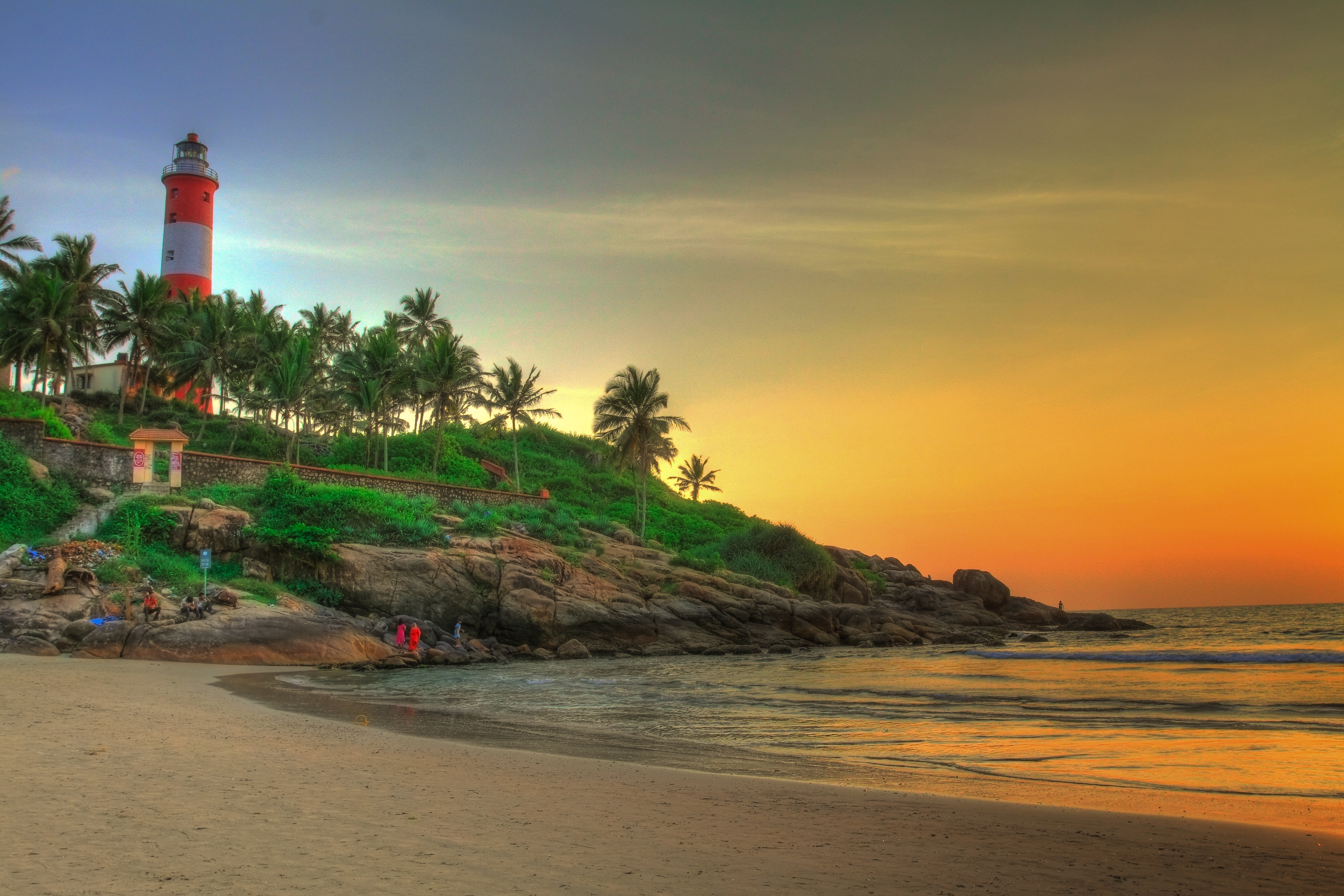
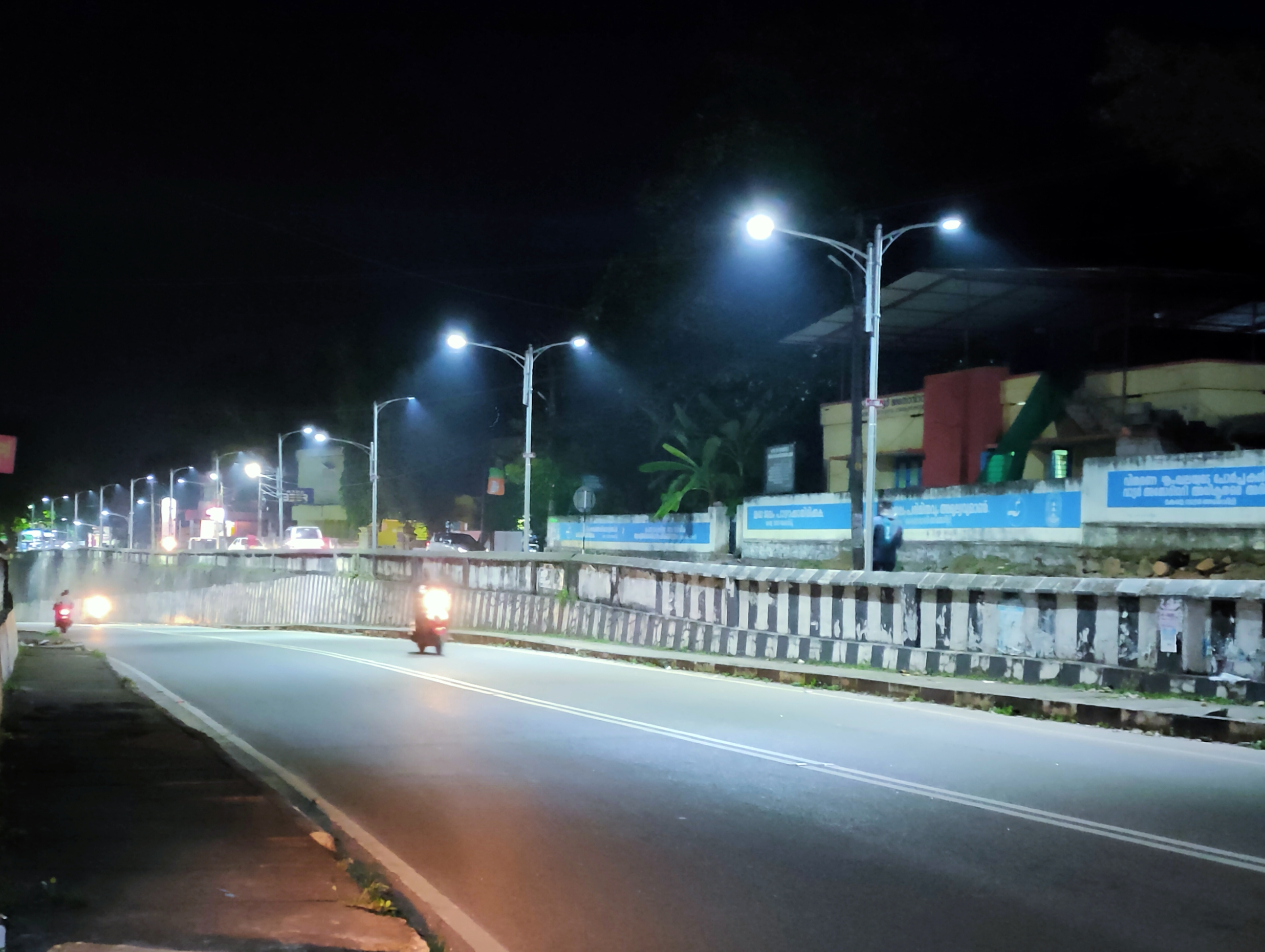
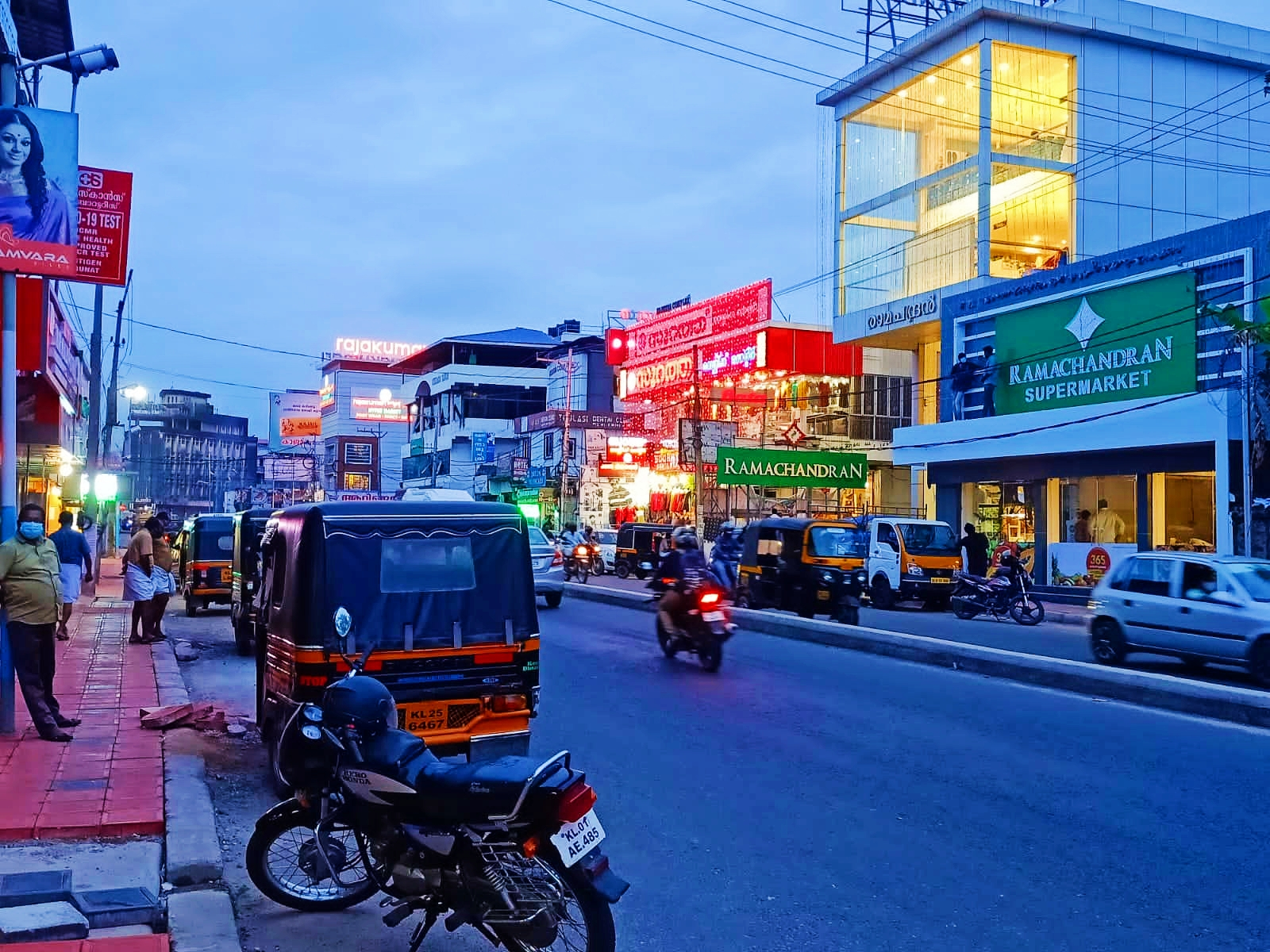
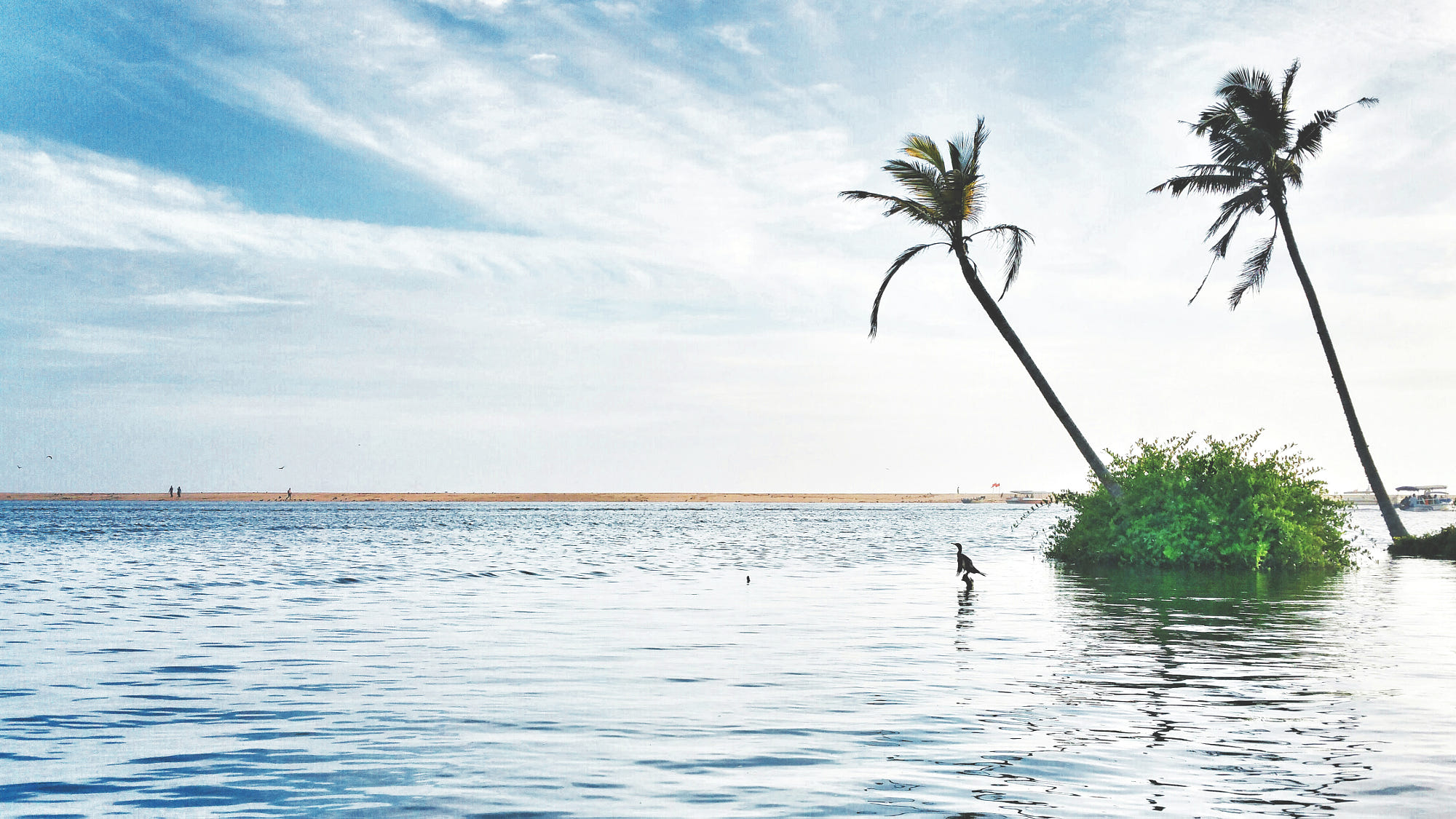
- Clockwise from top: Niyamasabha Mandiram, Kovalam Beach, Attingal, Poovar beach, Varkala underpass, and Anchuthengu Fort.

- Location in Kerala
- Thiruvananthapuram district
- Coordinates: 8.48°N 76.94°E
- Country: India
- State: Kerala
- Founder: Marthanda Varma
- Headquarters: Thiruvananthapuram
- Subdivisions: Revenue Divisions: 2: Thiruvananthapuram; Nedumangad; Taluks: 6: Thiruvananthapuram; Chirayinkeezhu; Varkala; Nedumangad; Kattakada; Neyyattinkara

Government
  - District Collector: Anu Kumari, IAS
  - DIG & Commissioner of Police: K.Karthik, IPS
  - District Police Chief (Rural): Juvvanapudi mahesh , IPS
- Legislative Assembly constituencies: 14
- Lok Sabha constituencies: 2 List: Thiruvananthapuram; Attingal

Area
  - Total: 2,192 km^{2} (846 sq mi)
  - Rank: 11th

Population (2021)
  - Total: 3,521,153 (male: 1,767,859; female: 1,753,294; transgender: 500)
  - Density: 1,606/km^{2} (4,160/sq mi)
  - Urban: 55.75%

Demographics
  - Literacy: 93.02%

Languages
  - Official: Malayalam, English
  - Regional: Malayalam - 98.25%; Tamil - 1.18%; Others - 0.57%
- Vehicle registration: KL-01 Thiruvananthapuram, KL-15 KSRTC, KL-16 Attingal, KL-19 Parassala, KL-20 Neyyattinkara, KL-21 Nedumangad, KL-22 Kazhakoottam, KL-74 Kattakkada, KL-81 Varkala
- Major highways: NH 66, NH 866
- HDI (2005): ▲0.773 (High)
- Average annual precipitation: 1,700 mm

Thiruvananthapuram District's location on map of India

Thiruvananthapuram district (Malayalam: [t̪iɾuʋɐnɐn̪d̪ɐpuɾɐm]) is the southernmost district in the Indian state of Kerala. The district was created in 1949, with its headquarters in the city of Thiruvananthapuram, which is also Kerala's administrative centre. The present district was created in 1956 by separating the four southernmost Taluks of the erstwhile district to form Kanyakumari district. The city of Thiruvananthapuram is also known as the Information technology capital of the state, since it is home to the first and largest IT park in India, Technopark, established in 1990. The district is home to more than 9% of total population of the state.

The district covers an area of 2,192 square kilometres (541,655 acres). At the 2011 census, it had a population of 3,301,427, making it the second most populous district in Kerala after Malappuram district. Its population density is the highest in Kerala, with 1,509 inhabitants per square kilometre (3,910/sq mi). The district is divided into six subdistricts: Thiruvananthapuram, Chirayinkeezhu, Neyyattinkara, Nedumangadu, Varkala, and Kattakada. The urban bodies in the district are the Thiruvananthapuram Corporation, and the Varkala, Neyyattinkara, Attingal, and Nedumangad municipalities.

Thiruvananthapuram district is located between 8.17°N 76.41°E and 8.54°N 77.17°E. At the southernmost extremity of the district, Kaliyikkavila is 54 kilometres (34 mi) from Kanyakumari, the southernmost point on the Indian peninsula. 33.75% of the district population lives in urban areas.

The district has three major rivers, several freshwater lakes, and over 300 ponds. Its eastern region is forested, northern regions are mostly under rubber cultivation and the remaining areas grow mixed dry-land crops of coconut, plantain, and tapioca, among others. Built-up areas and rice fields complete the land use pattern.

== Etymology ==
The name Thiruvananthapuram, shared by the district and its headquarters city, comes from the Malayalam/Tamil word "Thiru" and Sanskrit word "anantha-pura", meaning "Abode of Lord Anantha". The name derives from the deity of the Hindu temple at the center of Thiruvananthapuram city. Anantha is another name of Vishnu, the deity of Sree Padmanabhaswamy temple. The district's official name in English was Trivandrum until 1991, when the government reinstated the city's original name, Thiruvananthapuram, in all languages.

== History ==
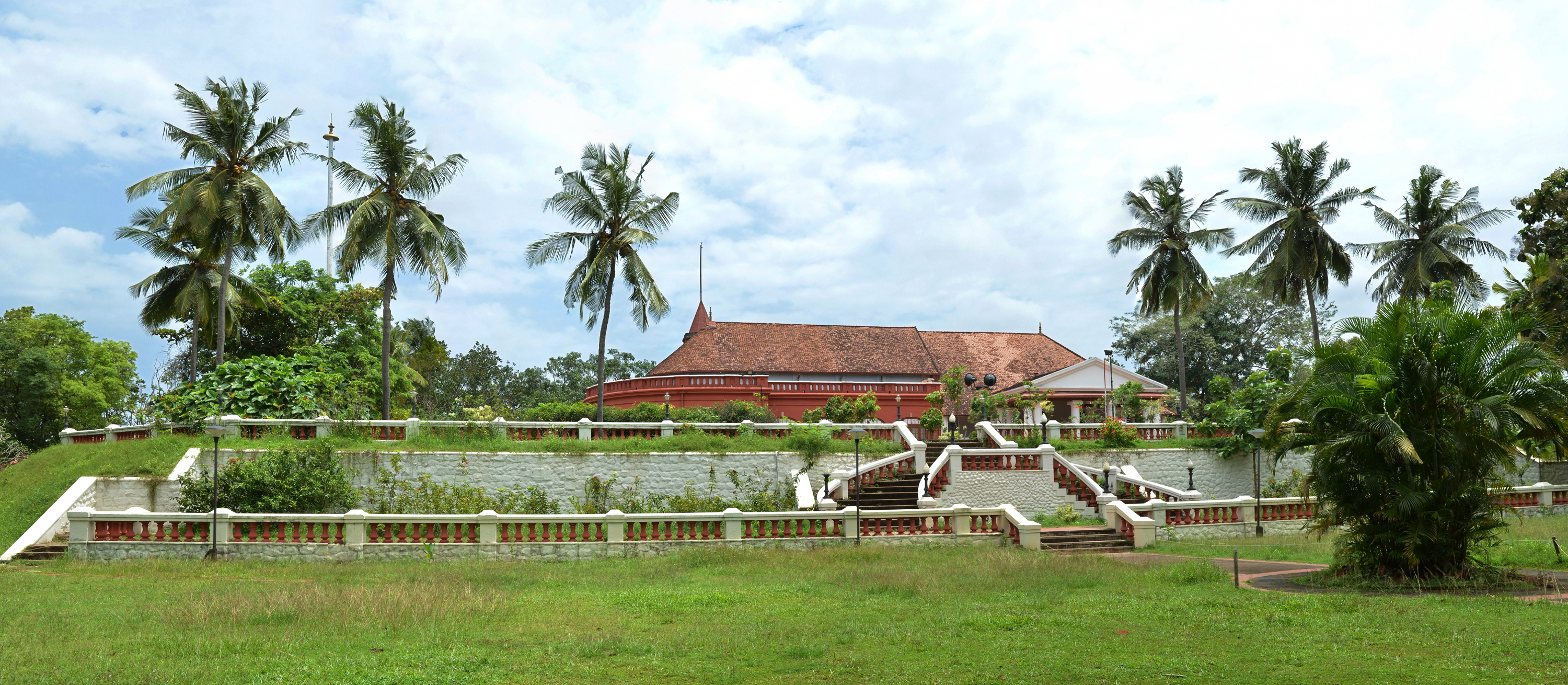
Kanakakkunnu Palace at Thiruvananthapuram

The city of Thiruvananthapuram features several landmarks with regards to ancient tradition, folklore, and literature. Several other locations in the district feature similar landmarks. The Chera dynasty governed the area of Malabar Coast between Kanyakumari in the south to Kasaragod in the north. This included Palakkad Gap, Coimbatore, Salem, and Kolli Hills. The region around Coimbatore served as the eastern entrance to the Palakkad Gap, the mountain pass that is the principal trade route between the Malabar Coast and Tamil Nadu. The southernmost region of present-day Malabar coast (the coastal belt between Kanyakumari and Kollam) was ruled by the Ay dynasty, who were related to, and officially feudatories of the Cheras. The Ay Dynasty (later known as the Venad Dynasty and finally the Thiruvithamkur Dynasty), followed by the Nannan Dynasty (later known as the Mushika dynasty and finally the Kolathiri dynasty), were the two oldest and most important lineages of the Velir clan, who had very frequent intermarriages with the Cheras, Cholas, and the Pandyas.

Present-day Thiruvananthapuram city, district, and Kanyakumari district, were ruled by the Ay dynasty during ancient and medieval ages, which was a Tamil kingdom based in the southernmost part of Indian Subcontinent. Ay kingdom had experienced attacks and conquests by Cholas and Pandyas in various periods. Later it became a part of Venad in late Middle Ages, which was eventually expanded as the powerful kingdom of Travancore in 18th century CE. The Tamil-Dravidian kind of architecture is also found in Padmanabhaswamy temple, which makes it distinct from the architectural style of temples in Kerala in general.

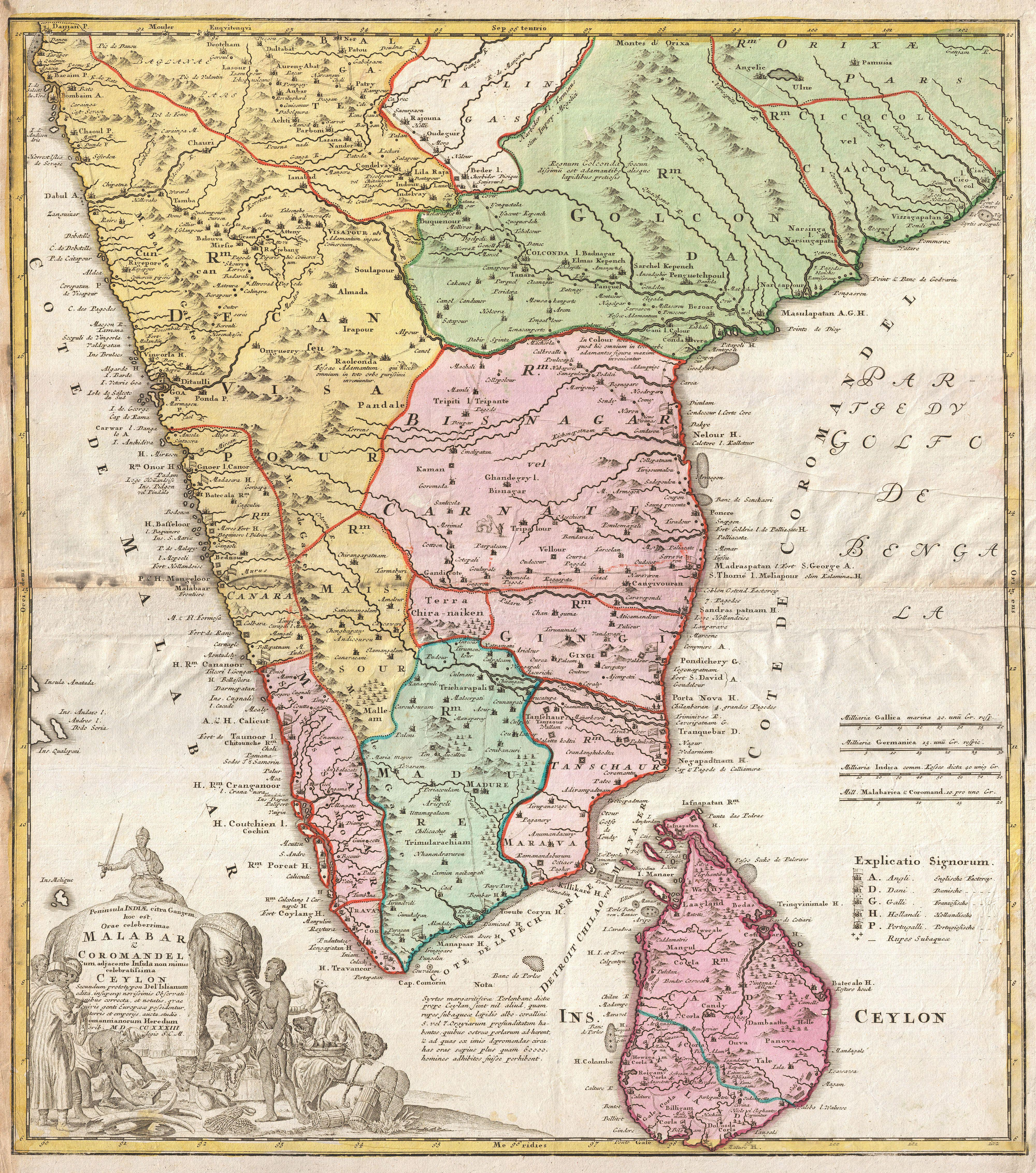
A map of Malabar Coast drawn by Homann Heirs in 1733. At that time, Travancore was only a small territory wedged between Kollam and Kanyakumari, as shown in the map (Present-day districts of Trivandrum and Kanyakumari only).

In 1684, during the regency of Umayamma Rani, the English East India Company acquired a sandy spit of land at Anchuthengu, near Varkala on the sea coast about 32 kilometres (20 mi) north of Thiruvananthapuram city, with a view to erecting a factory and fortifying it. The location had earlier been frequented by the Dutch, then by the British. It was from here that the English gradually extended their diplomacy to other parts of Travancore.

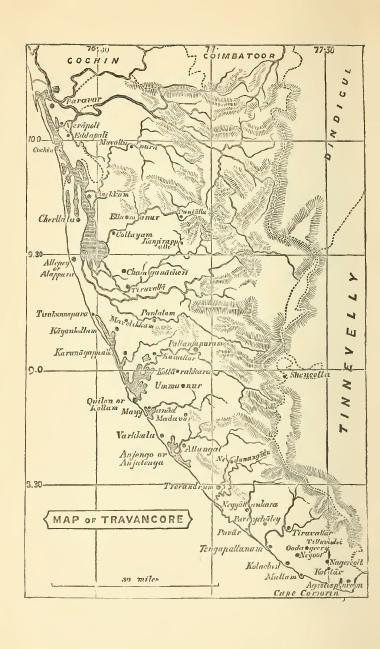
A map of the British Princely state of Travancore published in 1871

Modern history begins with Marthanda Varma (1729 CE–1758 CE), generally regarded as the Father of modern Travancore. In the early 18th century CE, the Travancore royal family adopted some members from the royal family of Kolathunadu (a long separated younger sister dynasty of Ay/Venad/Thiruvithamkur with whom they had the tradition of mutual adoption of heirs for centuries) based in Kannur. Thiruvananthapuram was known as a great center of intellectual and artistic activity at this time. Travancore became the most dominant state in Kerala by defeating the powerful Zamorin of Kozhikode in the battle of Purakkad in 1755.

The temple of Vishnu reclining on Anantha, the Sri Padmanabhaswamy temple, is the most recognizable and iconic landmark of the city and the district and dates back to the times of the Azhvars, and is one among the 108 shrines mentioned in their texts. In addition to the presiding deity of Padmanabha, this temple contains several shrines, dedicated to Krishna, Narasimha and Ayyappa. King Marthanda Varma, after his conquest of Southern Kerala upto the Aluva, submitted the kingdom to Padmanabha and took upon the title of 'Sree Padmanabhadasa', the Servant of Sree Padmanabha. The vast temple complex, with its tall Gopuram decorated with detailed carvings reflected in a huge temple tank, is today a center of attraction for devotees and sightseers.

The city was the capital of the Travancore state from 18th century CE until India's independence. The Thiruvananthapuram Municipality came into existence in 1920 as the first municipality in Travancore region. After two decades, during the reign of Sree Chithira Thirunal, Thiruvananthapuram Municipality was converted into Corporation on 30 October 1940. Consequent to the recommendations of the State Reorganization Commission, the Vilavancode subdistrict of Thiruvananthapuram was merged with Tamil Nadu, along with another three southern subdistricts, Thovala, Agastheewaram, and Kalkulam from Travancore which eventually formed Tamil Nadu's Kanyakumari district. The state of Kerala came into being on 1 November 1956.

=== Kilimanoor palace ===
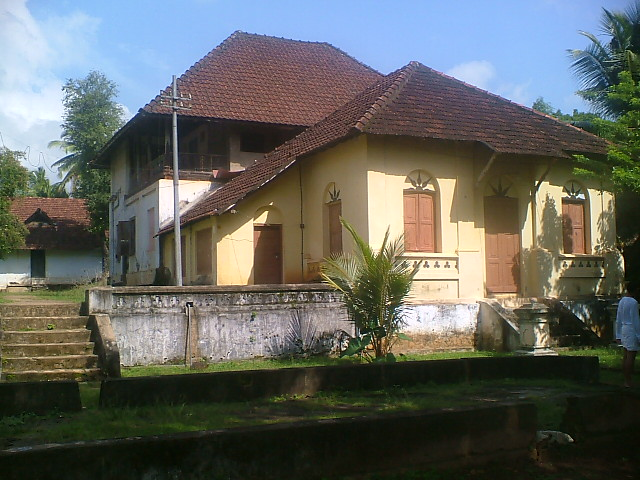
Birthplace of Raja Ravi Varma with his studio in the foreground

In 1705 (ME 880) the son and two daughters of Ittammar Raja of Parappanad royal house (originally based at Parappanangadi in present-day Malappuram district) were adopted into the Royal house of Venad. Ittammar Raja's sister and her sons, Rama Varma and Raghava Varma, settled in Kilimanoor and married the now adopted sisters. Marthanda Varma, the founder of the Kingdom of Travancore, was the son of Raghava Varma. The nephew of Raghava Varma, Ravi Varma Koil Thampuran, married the sister of Marthanda Varma. Their son became known as Dharma Raja Kartika Thirunnal Rama Varma.

In 1740 when an allied force, led by Dutchman Captain Hockert supporting the Deshinganadu King, attacked Venad, an army from Kilimanoor resisted and then defeated them. Although a small victory, this was the first time an Indian army had defeated a European power. In 1753, in recognition of this feat, Marthanda Varma exempted the areas controlled by the Kilimanoor palace from taxes, and granted them autonomous status. The present palace complex was built at this time, together with the Ayyappa temple. for the family deity, Sastha or Ayyapan.

Velu Thampi Dalawa held meetings at Kilimanoor palace while planning uprisings against the British. He handed over his sword at the palace before going into his final battle against the British, and India's first President, Dr Rajendra Prasad received this sword from the palace and it was kept in the National Museum in Delhi. Afterwards the sword was moved to the Napier Museum, Thiruvananthapuram.

== Geography ==
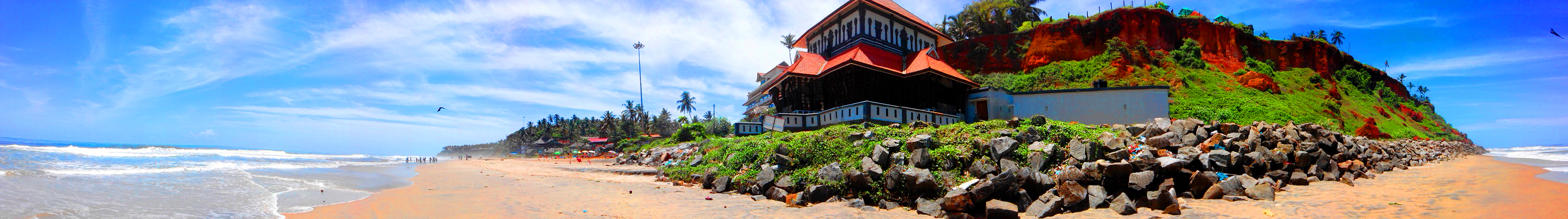
A panoramic view of Varkala Beach Cliff

The district is located between 8.17°N 76.41°E and 8.54°N 77.17°E. The southernmost part of the city, Parassala, is just 54 kilometres (34 mi) away from the southern peninsular tip of India, Cape Comorin (Kanyakumari). The district stretches 78 kilometres (48 mi) along the shores of the Arabian Sea on the west. Kollam district lies to the north, with the Tirunelveli and Kanyakumari districts of Tamil Nadu to the east and south respectively.

=== Climate ===
The climate of Thiruvananthapuram district is generally hot and tropical. Large forest reserves have a favorable effect on the climate and induce rains. Cold weather is experienced in the mountain ranges. Lower down, the weather is bracing, and generally hot in the coastal regions. The mean maximum temperature is 95 °F (35 °C) and the mean minimum temperature is 69 °F (20 °C). As the district stretches from north to south, with the Arabian Sea to the west, the relative humidity is generally high. It rises to about 95% during the southwest monsoon.

The total annual rainfall in the district is about 1,827.7 mm (72 in) per annum. The southwest monsoon, from June to September is the principal rainy season, during which the district receives most of its annual rainfall. The second rainy season is the Northeast monsoon, from October to November. The district also experiences thunderstorm rains in the pre-monsoon months of April and May.

December to February are the coolest months. The average temperature drops to 69 °F (20 °C) in these months, generally considered India's winter season. The summer season starts in February and continues until May. The average temperature rises to 95 °F (35 °C) in these months.

Climate data for Thiruvananthapuram
| Month | Jan | Feb | Mar | Apr | May | Jun | Jul | Aug | Sep | Oct | Nov | Dec | Year |
|---|---|---|---|---|---|---|---|---|---|---|---|---|---|
| Record high °C (°F) | 37 (99) | 38 (100) | 38 (100) | 38 (100) | 38 (100) | 39 (102) | 38 (100) | 38 (100) | 33 (91) | 38 (100) | 37 (99) | 36 (97) | 39 (102) |
| Mean daily maximum °C (°F) | 31.5 (88.7) | 31.9 (89.4) | 32.6 (90.7) | 32.6 (90.7) | 31.6 (88.9) | 29.7 (85.5) | 29.2 (84.6) | 29.4 (84.9) | 30.0 (86.0) | 29.9 (85.8) | 30.3 (86.5) | 31.0 (87.8) | 30.8 (87.4) |
| Mean daily minimum °C (°F) | 22.2 (72.0) | 22.8 (73.0) | 24.1 (75.4) | 24.9 (76.8) | 24.7 (76.5) | 23.5 (74.3) | 23.1 (73.6) | 23.2 (73.8) | 23.3 (73.9) | 23.3 (73.9) | 23.1 (73.6) | 22.6 (72.7) | 23.4 (74.1) |
| Record low °C (°F) | 15 (59) | 17 (63) | 20 (68) | 20 (68) | 20 (68) | 21 (70) | 18 (64) | 20 (68) | 18 (64) | 20 (68) | 20 (68) | 20 (68) | 15 (59) |
| Average precipitation mm (inches) | 22.7 (0.89) | 24.4 (0.96) | 40.4 (1.59) | 117.4 (4.62) | 230.4 (9.07) | 320.8 (12.63) | 226.8 (8.93) | 138.1 (5.44) | 174.6 (6.87) | 281.7 (11.09) | 184.5 (7.26) | 65.9 (2.59) | 1,827.7 (71.96) |
Source 1:
Source 2:

== Economy ==
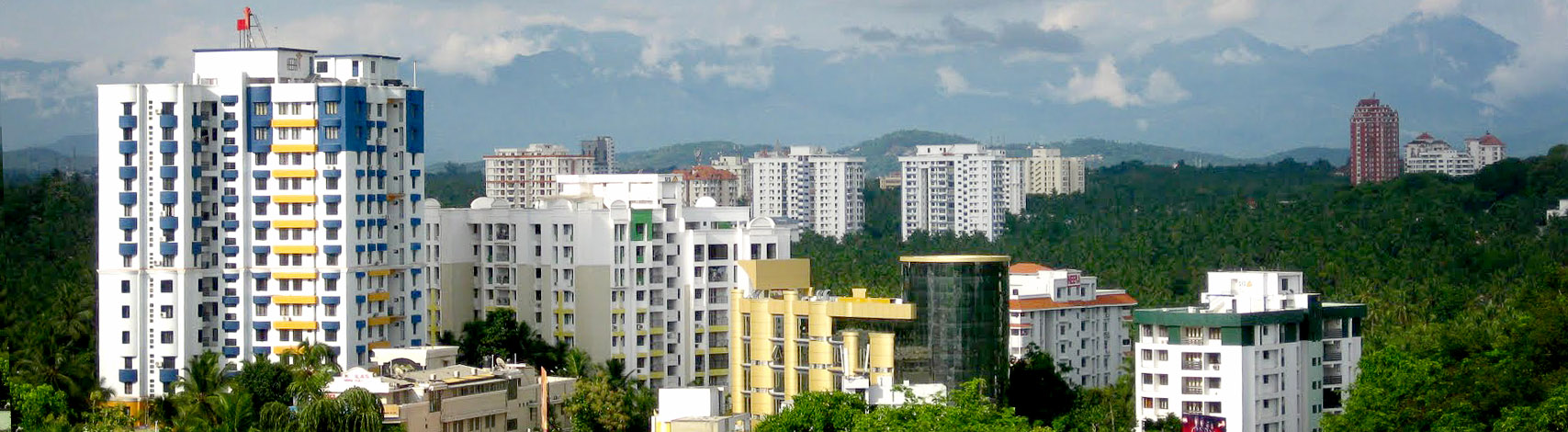
A view of the city of Thiruvananthapuram from Pattom.

The media and information technology sectors are mainstays of Thiruvananthapuram district's economy, and other major sectors are tourism and leisure, agriculture, and education. India's first animation park, the Kinfra Animation Park, is in the district.

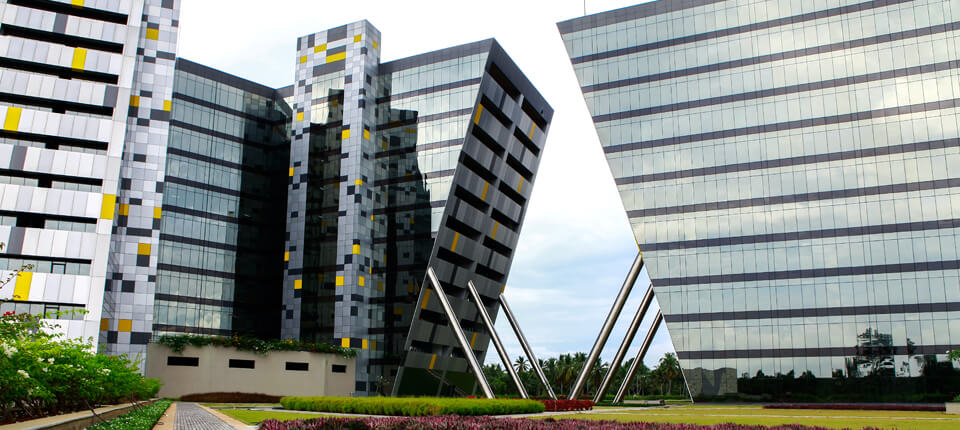
A Technopark building. Technopark as of 2010 has 450,000 m^{2} (4,800,000 sq ft) of built-up space, and is home to over 200 companies, employing around 30,000 professionals.

Thiruvananthapuram district has 2 central-sector, 14 state-sector, 1 co-operative-sector, 4 joint-sector, and 60 private-sector medium- and large-scale enterprises. As of 31 March 2003, Kerala State Industrial Development Corporation (KSIDC) units employed 9,262 people, and had invested Rs. 3439.4 million. In 2002, there were 901 registered working factories, including oil mills, cashew factories, Cotton mills, Sawmills, printing units, rubber industrial units, chemical units, match factories, general engineering units, and automobile workshops. The Shree Mulam Thirunal Shashtiabdapoorthy Memorial Institute (S.M.S.M. Institute) in Thiruvananthapuram city is a major state government emporium marketing products of Kerala's handicraft industries.

The Neyyar Irrigation Project, commissioned in 1959, irrigates an area of 116.65 km^{2} (45.0 sq mi). The Neyyar river is the source of water for the Neyyar reservoir. The dam is 294.13 metres (965.0 ft) long and 50.6 metres (166.0 ft) high. The catchment draining into the reservoir, covering an area of 140 km^{2} (54 sq mi) of forest, receives an annual average rainfall of about 2,260 mm (90 in) 2260 mm from the two monsoons. The total length of the main canal and its branches is 266 km (165 mi).

== Administration ==
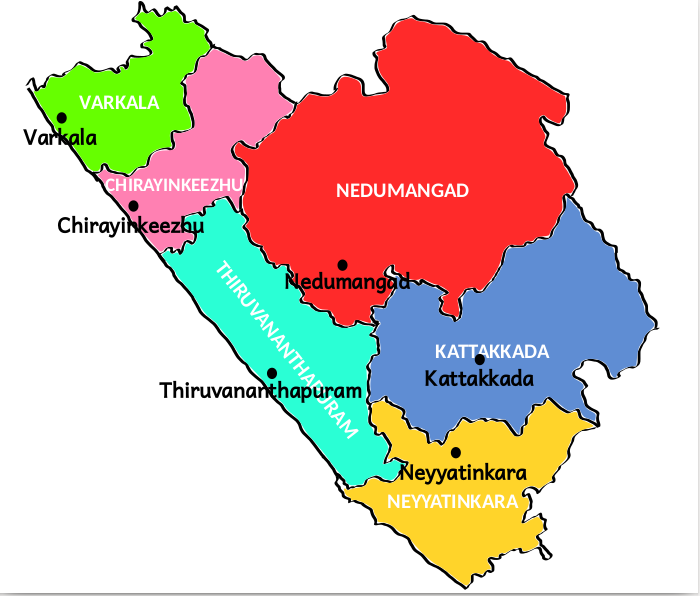
Taluks of Thiruvananthapuram district

=== Collectorate ===
The headquarters of the district administration is at Kudappanakunnu, Thiruvananthapuram. The district administration is headed by the District collector. He/She is assisted by five deputy collectors with responsibility for general matters, land acquisition, revenue recovery, land reforms, disaster management and elections. For revenue administration, the district is divided into two revenue divisions: Thiruvananthapuram and Nedumangad, each headed by a Revenue Divisional Officer (RDO) or Sub Collector, who is also the Sub Divisional Magistrate.

=== Taluks ===
The district is divided into two revenue divisions which together incorporate six Taluks, each of which is headed by a Tehsildar, within them.

- Taluks in the Thiruvananthapuram Revenue Division are:

| Neyyattinkara | Thiruvananthapuram | Chirayinkeezhu | Varkala |

- Taluks in the Nedumangad Revenue Division are:

| Kattakkada | Nedumangad |

=== Revenue villages ===
Thiruvananthapuram district is divided into 124 revenue villages for the ease and decentralisation of its revenue administration. They are further incorporated into 6 taluks as eludicated below.

==== Neyyattinkara Taluk ====
- Anavoor
- Athiyannur
- Balaramapuram
- Chenkal
- Kanjiramkulam
- Karode
- Karumkulam
- Kollayil
- Kottukal
- Kulathoor
- Kulaviyode
- Kunnathukal
- Neyyattinkara
- Pallichal
- Parassala
- Parasuvaikkal
- Perumkadavila
- Perumpazhuthoor
- Poovar
- Thirupuram
- Vellarada
- Vizhinjam

==== Kattakada Taluk ====
- Amboori
- Kallikkad
- Keezharoor
- Kulathummal
- Malayinkeezhu
- Mannoorkara
- Maranalloor
- Ottasekharamangalam
- Perumkulam
- Vazhichal
- Veeranakavu
- Vilappil
- Vilavoorkkal

==== Thiruvananthapuram Taluk ====
- Andoorkonam
- Attipra
- Ayiroopara
- Cheruvakkal
- Kadakampally
- Kadinamkulam
- Kalliyoor
- Kazhakoottam
- Keezhthonnakkal
- Kowdiar
- Kudappanakunnu
- Manacaud
- Melthonnakkal
- Menamkulam
- Muttathara
- Nemom
- Pallippuram
- Pangappara
- Pattom
- Peroorkada
- Pettah
- Sasthamangalam
- Thirumala
- Thiruvallam
- Thycaud
- Uliyazhathura
- Ulloor
- Vanchiyoor
- Vattiyoorkavu
- Veiloor
- Venganoor

==== Nedumangad Taluk ====
- Anad
- Aruvikkara
- Aryanadu
- Kaduvakuzhy
- Kallara
- Karakulam
- Karippoor
- Koliyakode
- Kurupuzha
- Manikkal
- Nedumangad
- Nellanad
- Palode
- Panavoor
- Pangode
- Peringamala
- Pullampara
- Thekkada
- Thennoor
- Tholicode
- Uzhamalackal
- Vamanapuram
- Vattappara
- Vellanad
- Vembayam
- Vithura

==== Chirayinkeezhu Taluk ====
- Alamkode
- Anchuthengu
- Attingal
- Avanavanchery
- Azhoor
- Chirayinkeezhu
- Edakode
- Elamba
- Kadakkavoor
- Karavaram
- Keezhattingal
- Kilimanoor
- Kizhivillam
- Koonthalloor
- Koduvazhannoor
- Mudakkal
- Nagaroor
- Pazhayakunnummel
- Pulimath
- Sarkara
- Vakkom
- Vellalloor

==== Varkala Taluk ====
- Ayiroor
- Chemmaruthy
- Cherunniyoor
- Edava
- Kadampattukonam
- Kudavoor
- Madavoor
- Manamboor
- Muthana
- Navaikulam
- Ottoor
- Pallickal
- Varkala
- Vettoor

== Local governance ==
Local governance in Thiruvananthapuram district is administered through a three-tier system under the Kerala Panchayati Raj Act, 1994, along with urban local bodies governed by the Kerala Municipality Act, 1994. The rural areas of the district are managed by gram panchayats at the village level, block panchayats at the intermediate level, and the district panchayat at the apex. Urban areas are governed by municipal corporations and municipalities. Thiruvananthapuram district has one municipal corporation — the Thiruvananthapuram Municipal Corporation — and several municipalities, including Neyyattinkara, Nedumangad, Attingal, Varkala, and Kattakada. The district panchayat oversees the coordinated development of rural local bodies, while urban bodies function independently under their respective councils.

Local government institutions in Thiruvananthapuram district
| Level of local government | Number of entities |
|---|---|
| District Panchayat | 1 |
| Block Panchayats | 11 |
| Gram Panchayats | 78 |
| Municipalities | 4 |
| Municipal Corporation | 1 |

== Politics ==
Thiruvananthapuram district sees a dynamic political landscape with major alliances led by the Communist Party of India (Marxist), Indian National Congress and the Bharatiya Janata Party. The Left Democratic Front (LDF), led by CPI(M), and the United Democratic Front (UDF), led by Congress, dominate the scene, alongside the National Democratic Alliance (NDA), led by the Bharatiya Janata Party. In the 2019 General Election, both Thiruvananthapuram and Attingal parliamentary constituencies in the Thiruvananthapuram district were won by the Indian National Congress-led United Democratic Front (UDF). In the 2026 Assembly Election, the Left Democratic Front (LDF) and United Democratic Front (UDF) both won 6 seats each with the BJP winning the remaining 2.

=== Legislative representation ===
There are two Lok Sabha constituency in Thiruvananthapuram: Attingal and Thiruvananthapuram.

| District | No. | Constituency | Name | Party | Alliance | Remarks |
|---|---|---|---|---|---|---|
| Thiruvananthapuram | 127 | Varkala | V. Joy | CPI(M) | LDF | |
| Thiruvananthapuram | 128 | Attingal | O. S. Ambika | CPI(M) | LDF | |
| Thiruvananthapuram | 129 | Chirayinkeezhu (SC) | Ramya Haridas | INC | UDF | |
| Thiruvananthapuram | 130 | Nedumangad | G. R. Anil | CPI | LDF | |
| Thiruvananthapuram | 131 | Vamanapuram | Sudheersha Palode | INC | UDF | |
| Thiruvananthapuram | 132 | Kazhakkoottam | V. Muraleedharan | BJP | NDA | |
| Thiruvananthapuram | 133 | Vattiyoorkavu | K. Muraleedharan | INC | UDF | Minister of Health & Devaswoms |
| Thiruvananthapuram | 134 | Thiruvananthapuram | C. P. John | CMP | UDF | Minister of Transport |
| Thiruvananthapuram | 135 | Nemom | Rajeev Chandrasekhar | BJP | NDA | |
| Thiruvananthapuram | 136 | Aruvikkara | G. Steephen | CPI(M) | LDF | |
| Thiruvananthapuram | 137 | Parassala | C. K. Hareendran | CPI(M) | LDF | |
| Thiruvananthapuram | 138 | Kattakkada | M. R. Baiju | INC | UDF | |
| Thiruvananthapuram | 139 | Kovalam | M. Vincent | INC | UDF | |
| Thiruvananthapuram | 140 | Neyyattinkara | N. Sakthan | INC | UDF | |

|}

== Major Towns ==
The major towns in these district include:

- Varkala taluk: Varkala, Edava, Navaikulam
- Chirayinkeezh taluk: Chirayinkeezhu,Attingal, Kilimanoor, Vakkom
- Thiruvanathapuram taluk: Thiruvanathapuram, Kazhakootam, Sreekariyam, Ullor, Pattom, Veli, Akkulam, Pothancad
- Neyyattinkara taluk:Nemom, Balaramapuram, Neyyattinkara, Aamaravila, Parassala
- Kattakada taluk: Kattakada, Vellarada, Amboori
- Nedumanagad taluk: Nedumangad, Vithura, Tholicode, Aryanad

=== Municipal towns ===
There are 4 municipal towns in the district. They are:

Municipal towns in Thiruvananthapuram district (4)
| Sl no. | Municipality | Population (2011) |
|---|---|---|
| 1. | Neyyattinkara | 70,850 |
| 2. | Nedumangad | 60,161 |
| 3. | Varkala | 40,048 |
| 4. | Attingal | 37,648 |

== Transport ==
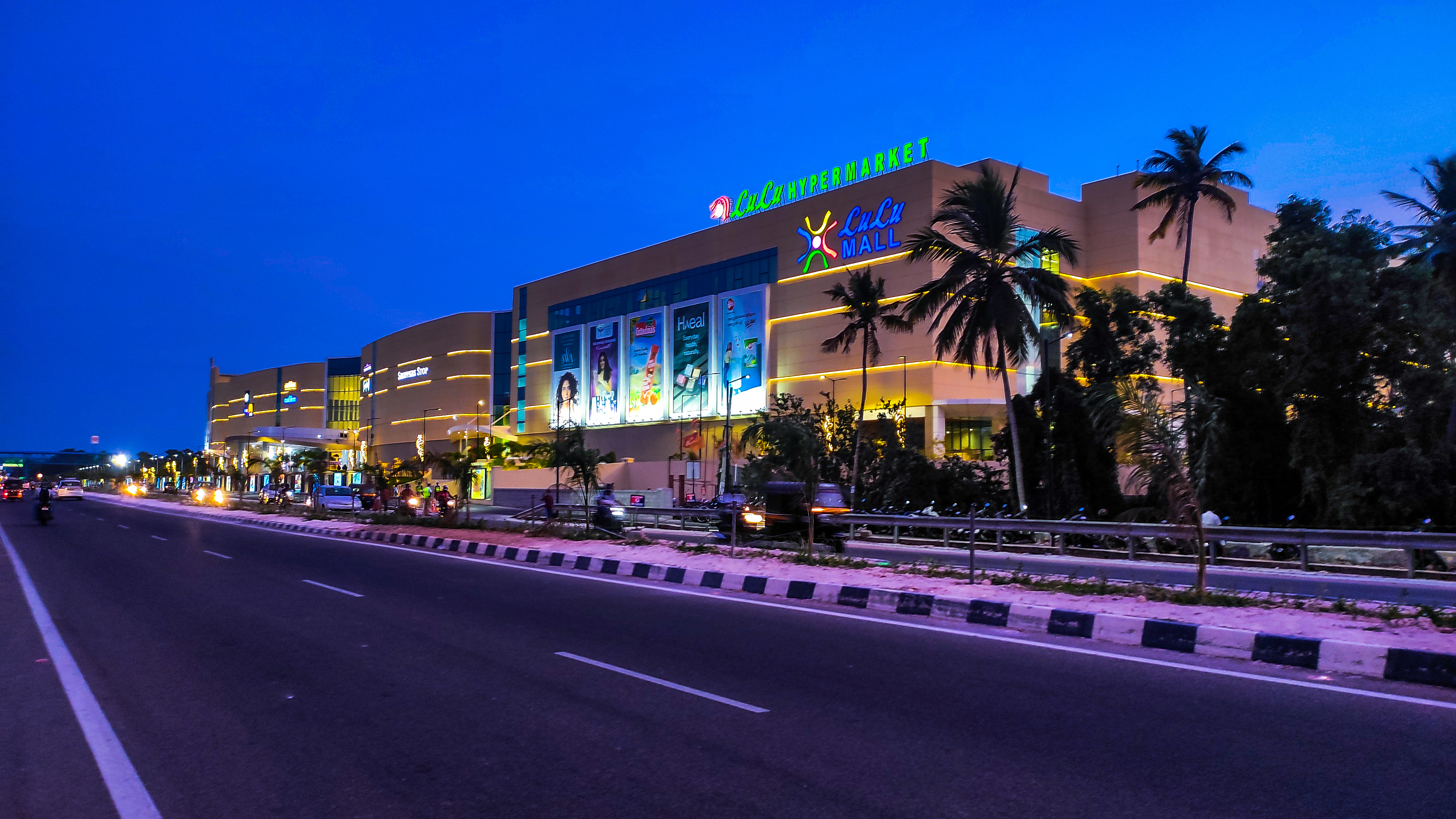
A highway at Akkulam in Thiruvananthapuram

National Highway 66 (formerly known as National Highway 47) stretches from Kaliyikkavila at its southern end to Navaikulam near Parippally in the north, covering a distance of 80 km (50 mi) within the district. The Main Central Road covers a distance of 55 km (34 mi), passing through Kesavadasapuram, Vembayam, Venjaramoodu, Kilimanoor, and Nilamel in the north. The Kerala Public Works Department maintains some 1,552 km (964 mi) of road in the district. Local bodies are responsible for the maintenance of 9,500 km (5,900 mi) of road. There are 116 bridges in Thiruvananthapuram District.

Rail transport in the district is operated by Southern Railway zone of Indian Railways. Thiruvananthapuram is connected to the rest of the country by broad gauge railway line. 82 km (51 mi) of railway line passes through the district. Thiruvananthapuram district currently has 20 stations, including Thiruvananthapuram Central railway station.

Domestic and international airlines operate from Thiruvananthapuram International Airport, which has direct flights to many international cities, including Kuwait City, Dubai, Dammam, Singapore, Malé, Colombo, Sharjah, Muscat, Manama, Doha, Jeddah, and Abu Dhabi. Domestic flights link it with Chennai, Delhi, Mumbai, Hyderabad, Bangalore, and Kolkata.

== Demographics ==
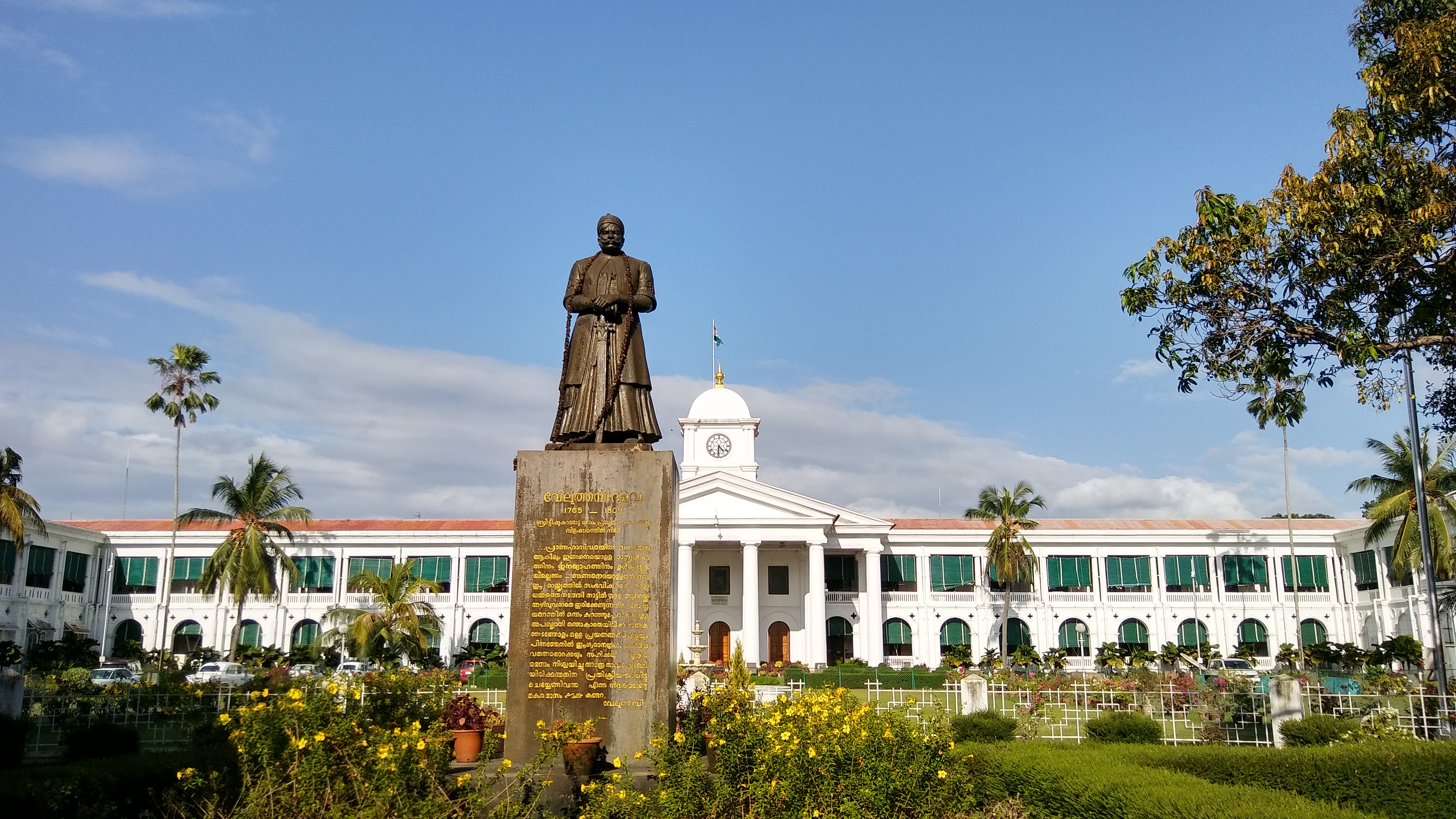
The Kerala Government Secretariat at Thiruvananthapuram

Historical population

| Year | Pop. | ±% p.a. |
|---|---|---|
| 1901 | 484,493 | — |
| 1911 | 569,472 | +1.63% |
| 1921 | 666,393 | +1.58% |
| 1931 | 856,851 | +2.55% |
| 1941 | 1,015,057 | +1.71% |
| 1951 | 1,327,812 | +2.72% |

| Year | Pop. | ±% p.a. |
|---|---|---|
| 1961 | 1,744,531 | +2.77% |
| 1971 | 2,198,606 | +2.34% |
| 1981 | 2,596,112 | +1.68% |
| 1991 | 2,946,650 | +1.27% |
| 2001 | 3,234,356 | +0.94% |
| 2011 | 3,301,427 | +0.21% |

According to the 2011 census Thiruvananthapuram district has a population of 3,301,427. This gives it a ranking of 103rd in India out of a total of 640 districts. The district has a population density of 1,509 inhabitants per square kilometre (3,910/sq mi). Its population growth rate over the decade 2001–2011 was 2.25%. Thiruvananthapuram has a sex ratio of 1088 females for every 1000 males, and a literacy rate of 92.66%. 53.66% of the population lives in urban areas. Scheduled Castes and Scheduled Tribes make up 11.30% and 0.81% of the population respectively.

=== Religion ===
Religions in Thiruvananthapuram district (2011)
| Religion | Percent |
| Hinduism | 66.46% |
| Christianity | 19.10% |
| Islam | 13.72% |
| Other or not stated | 0.72% |

Hindus (66.46%) constitute the majority of the population, followed by Christians (19.10%) and Muslims (13.72%). The Hindu community consists of Nairs, Nadars, Tamil Brahmins, Ezhavas, Viswakarma etc. The Christians belong mainly to the Catholic Church (including the Latin Church, Syro-Malankara Catholic Church, the Syro-Malabar Catholic Church), the Pentecostal churches, the Church of South India, the Malankara Orthodox Syrian Church, and the Mar Thoma Syrian Church.The Malankara Orthodox in the district are covered by the Malankara Orthodox Diocese of Trivandrum with 94 parishes at formation and currently under bishop Gabriel Mar Gregorios. The Sunni Muslim community also forms a major division of the Muslim population of the district.

Percentage distribution of Castes, Denominations, and Sects in Hindu, Christian, and Muslim population of the District respectively(average 2008-2014)
| Hindu Castes | Percentage | Christian Denominations | Percentage | Muslim Sects | Percentage |
| Nair | 38.9 | Syro-Malankara Catholics | 21.6 | Sunni | 73.4 |
| Ezhava | 26.8 | Syro-Malabar Catholics | 2.3 | Shia | 26.6 |
| Schedule Caste | 15.0 | Latin Catholics | 23.4 | | |
| Nadar | 4.3 | Jacobite | 2.8 | | |
| Viswakarma | 5.9 | Orthodox | 10.9 | | |
| Brahmin | 1.2 | Mar Thoma | 3.6 | | |
| Schedule Tribe | 0.5 | CSI | 17.1 | | |
| Others | 7.3 | Dalit Christians | 2.7 | | |
| | | Pentocost | 6.2 | | |
| | | Others | 9.5 | | |
| TOTAL | 100% | | 100% | | 100% |

=== Language ===
Languages of Thiruvananthapuram district (2011)
1. Malayalam (98.2%)
2. Tamil (1.18%)
3. Others (0.57%)

Malayalam is the predominant mother tongue. Tamil is mostly spoken in the southern parts of the district and among the Tamil population in the capital city especially by Nadars and Tamil Brahmins and various other Tamil communities. Thiruvananthapuram city is more cosmopolitan, with speakers of languages including Malayalam, Tamil, English, Telugu, Hindi, Tulu and a small percentage of Marathi.

=== Socio-economic conditions ===
More than 50% of the total population depends on agriculture for its livelihood. Agricultural workers constitute 42% of the total labour class. Most of the workforce is engaged in low-income, low capital intensity occupations. Political and social awareness and the efforts of social, religious and cultural leaders have contributed to breaking down the traditional feudal order. Economic changes have also had an impact on community social life and attitudes.

== Culture ==
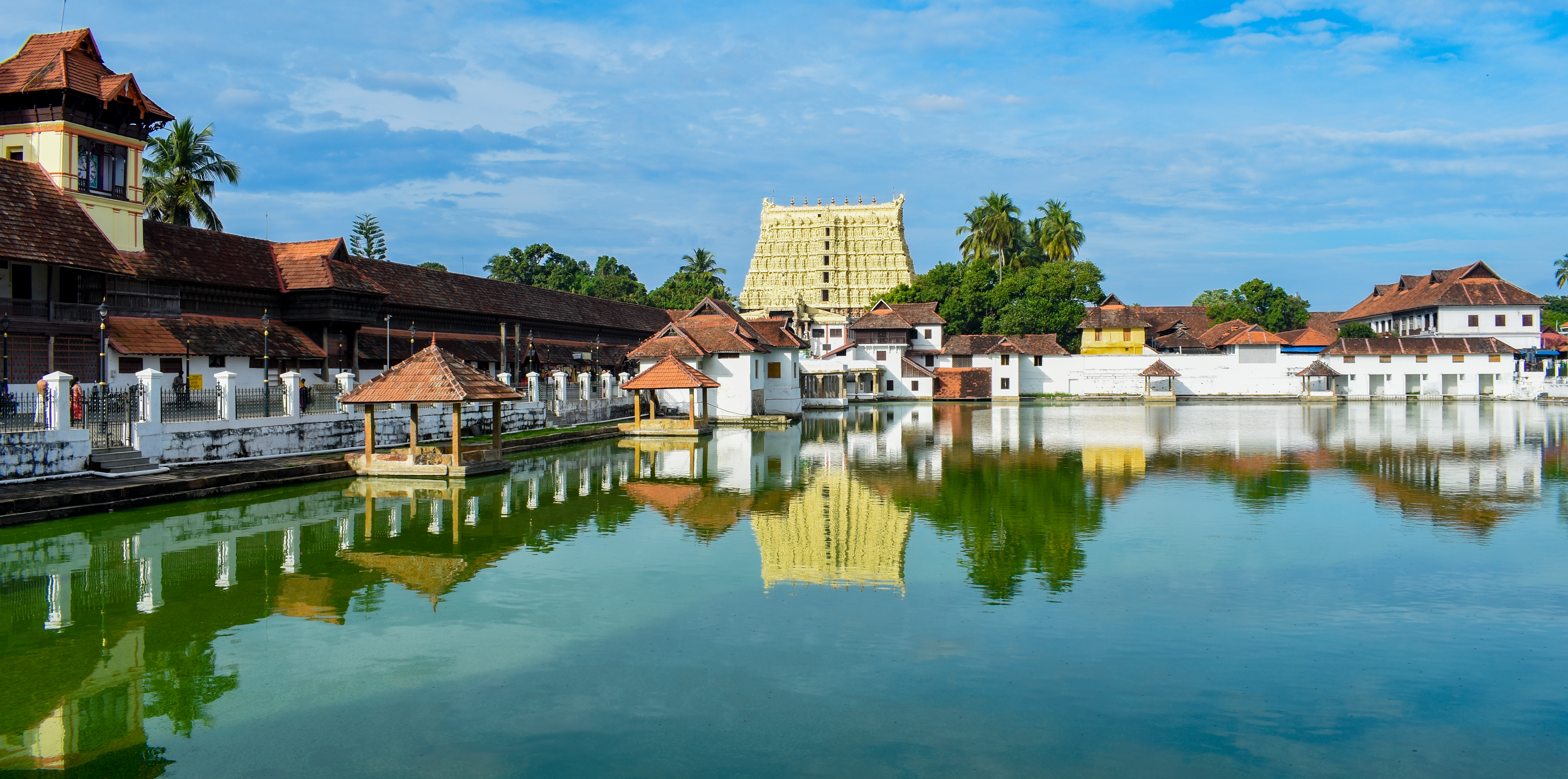
The Padmanabhaswamy Temple in Thiruvananthapuram.

In the 20th century, Thiruvananthapuram witnessed a cultural renaissance. Kerala Varma Valiakoi Thampuran (1845–1914), who spent a major part of his life in Thiruvananthapuram, translated Kalidasa's Abhijñānaśākuntalam into Malayalam, which earned him the title of Kerala Kalidasa. He is regarded as the father of modern Malayalam prose.

The city is home to animation companies, including Toonz India Ltd and Tata Elxsi Ltd. The Kinfra Film and Video Park, near the Technopark, is an advanced film and animation production facility.

Other major cultural events include the annual flower show in Thiruvananthapuram city, the Attukal Pongala, the Varkala Sivagiri pilgrimage in December, the Kaalioottu in Sarkara Devi Temple near Chirayinkeezh, the Navarathri festival at the Poojamandapam near Sri Padmanabha Swamy Temple, the Aaraat of Padmanabha Swamy Temple, the Beemapally Uroos, and the Vettucaud Perunaal.

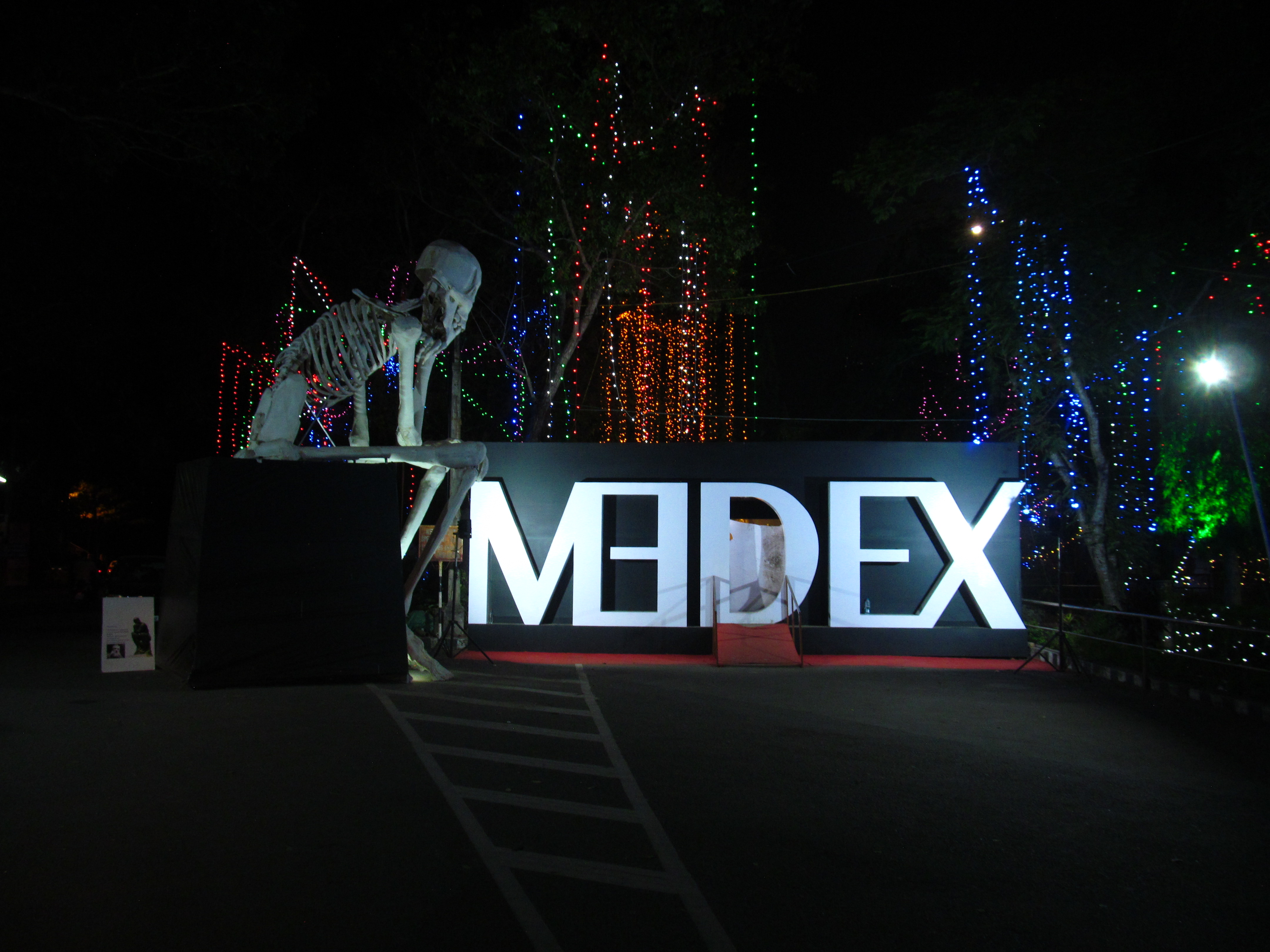
One of Kerala's biggest medical exhibitions, held at Trivandrum Medical College

== Flora and fauna ==
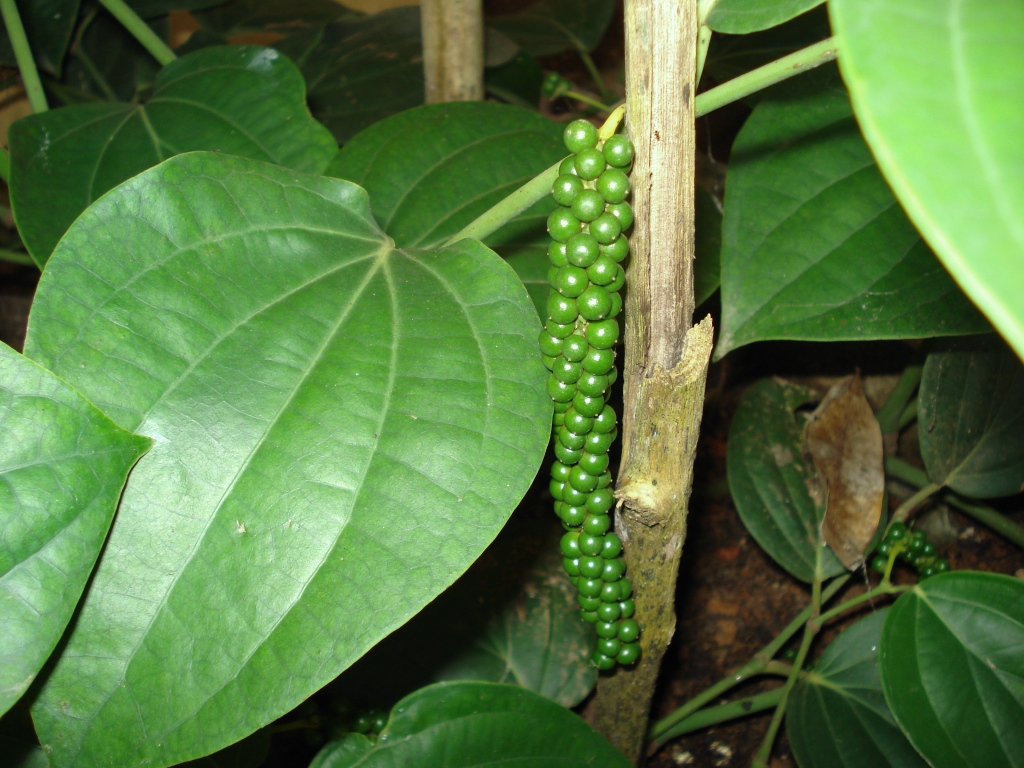
A pepper plant. Aromatic plants and spices are cultivated on a large scale on the hilly tracts.

The district has a rich diversity of plants, ranging from rare orchids, medicinal plants, and spices to hedge plants, tuber crops, and plants yielding edible fruits and fibre. Aromatic plants and spices, such as pepper and ginger, are cultivated on a large scale on the hilly tracts. Nedumangad taluk is one of the biggest centres for the cultivation and trade of pepper and other hill produce. A major portion of the district lies on the middle plain, where coconut, rice, tapioca, tuber crops, plantains, and vegetables are cultivated.

The forests of the district abound in a variety of animals and birds, providing excellent wildlife habitats. Elephants, bison, monkeys, and rare reptiles are among the most prominent species. Nestled in the Western Ghats, a wildlife sanctuary extends over an area of nearly 777 square kilometres (300 sq mi) around the Neyyar reservoir. The forest at the foot of the Kulathupuzha range is the habitat of rare species of snakes and lizards. Among characteristic mammals of the region are the Nilgiri langur, lion-tailed macaque, Nilgiri brown mongoose, and the Malabar civet. Carnivores include the tiger, wild cat, jackal, leopard, and dhole (Indian wild dog). The Sloth bear, gaur, a few species of deer and elephants are also seen. Reptiles include snakes, lizards, crocodiles, and tortoises. There are some 75–80 species of snakes in this area of which some are highly venomous.

== Tourism ==
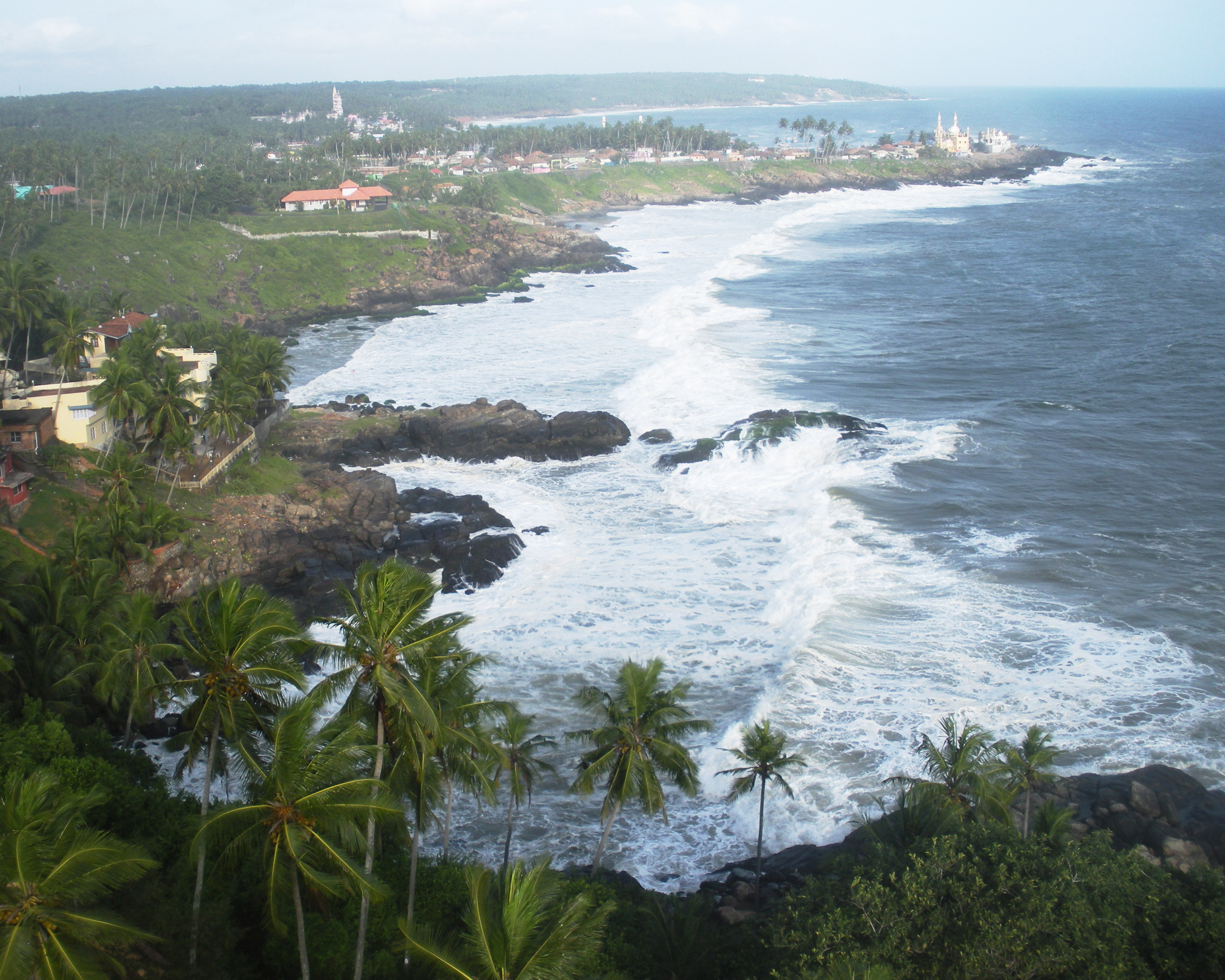
Kovalam

Tourism is a major sector of Thiruvananthapuram's economy. A full range of tourist options is available in the district, including hill stations, the Kerala backwaters, beaches, lagoons, and wildlife sanctuaries. Kovalam & Varkala and its internationally known beaches are in Thiruvananthapuram district.

Thiruvananthapuram is a major destination for chartered flights to India for medical tourism, with over fifty recognized Ayurveda centres in and around the city. The city also offers world-class modern hospitals. Convalescent facilities are available at nearby five-star beach resorts and hill stations.

== Education ==
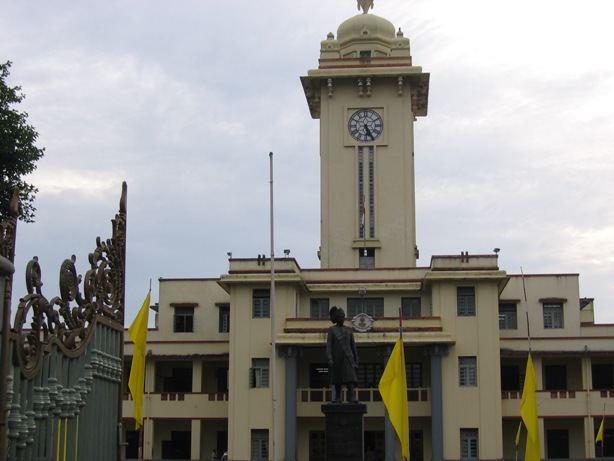
Kerala University administrative Building in Thiruvananthapuram

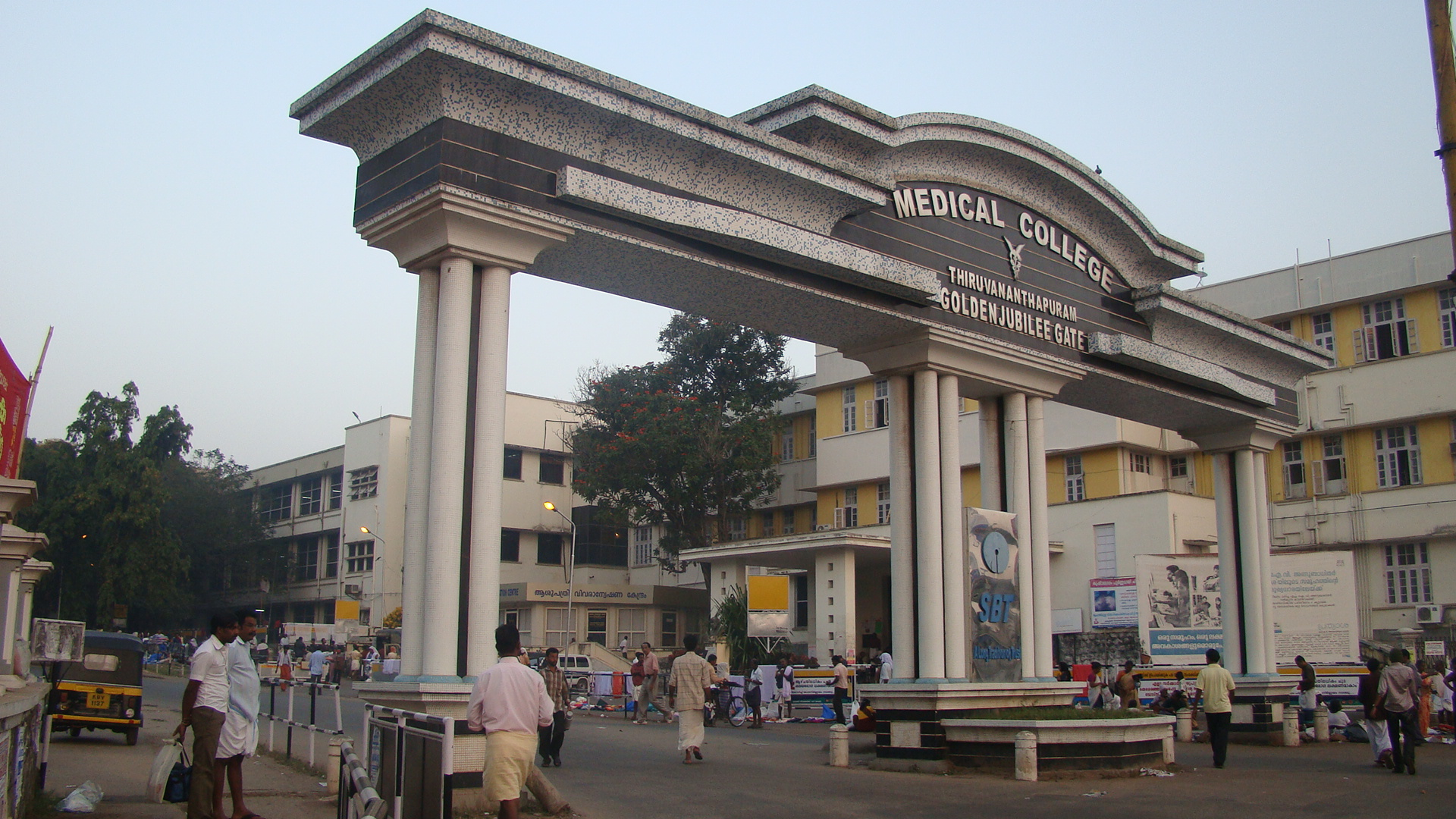
Government Medical College, Thiruvananthapuram

Thiruvananthapuram district is a major academic hub. The University of Kerala is in Thiruvananthapuram city. There are 20 arts and sciences colleges in the district, and the estimated total number of students is 15,926. The University of Kerala has its research and higher-education centres at Kariavattom.

Thiruvananthapuram Medical College is the premier health institute of the state and one of the finest in the country. It is being upgraded to the status of an All India Institute of Medical Sciences (AIIMS). Thiruvananthapuram's three main engineering colleges are the College of Engineering, Trivandrum, Government Engineering College, Barton Hill, and Sree Chitra Thirunal College of Engineering. The two main law colleges are the Government Law College, Thiruvananthapuram and the Kerala Law Academy Law College. Among the many other well-known arts and sciences colleges are University College Thiruvananthapuram, Mahatma Gandhi College, Mar Ivanios College, Government Arts College, Thiruvananthapuram, College of Fine Arts Trivandrum, Sree Narayana College Chempazhanthy and Swathi Thirunal College of Music, Indian Institute of Space Science and Technology, Centre for Development Studies, L B S Institute of Technology for Women, Central Polytechnic College, Vattiyoorkavu and the College of Engineering Attingal.

- There are 1,129 schools in the district, classified as Government, Aided, or Unaided schools.
- Government schools are directly run by the state government, and follow the state government syllabus.
- Aided schools also follow the state syllabus. Additionally, there are four Kendriya Vidyalayas and Jawahar Navodaya Vidyalaya run directly by the Central government and following the Central Board of Secondary Education (CBSE) syllabus.
- Private schools run by education trusts or boards may follow any or all of the CBSE, Indian Certificate of Secondary Education (ICSE), National Institute of Open Schooling (NIOS) or Kerala state syllabi. The first international school in Kerala, the Trivandrum International School, was started in August 2003.

No. of Schools in Thiruvananthapuram District 2019-20
| Category | Govt. | Govt. Aided | Unaided Private |
|---|---|---|---|
| Lower Primary(LP) | 307 | 172 | 26 |
| Upper Primary(UP) | 101 | 97 | 22 |
| Secondary(HS) | 131 | 94 | 48 |
| Higher Secondary (HSS)^{*} | 82 | 55 | 40 |
| Total | 621 | 328 | 136 |
^{*} from statistics 2018-2019

Schools in Kerala 2019-20
1. Govt. (36.7%)
2. Govt. Aided (53.6%)
3. Unaided Private (9.70%)

== Media ==
Thiruvananthapuram has long been a media center in India. Kerala Chandrika, the first newspaper of the state, was published from Thiruvananthapuram in 1789. Now, more than 30 newspapers have been published from the district, including The Hindu, The New Indian Express, The Deccan Chronicle, The Times of India, Malayala Manorama, Mathrubhoomi, Kerala Kaumudi, Desabhimani, Deepika, Madhyamam, Chandrika, Thejas, Siraj, Janmabhoomi and Metro Vaartha.

Weeklies, fortnightlies, monthlies, bi-monthlies and quarterlies are published from parts of the district. The Kerala Information and Public Relations Department is the main government agency disseminating information to the public and for the provision of feedback.

Most Malayalam television channels are based in Thiruvananthapuram. The government-owned Doordarshan began broadcasting from the city in 1981. Asianet, the first private Malayalam channel, began its telecasts from Thiruvananthapuram in 1991.

The district has many radio stations, most broadcasting from Thiruvananthapuram city. All India Radio has an AM (1161 MHz), an FM (Ananthapuri FM; 101.9 MHz) and a SW ( various frequencies ) station in the city. FM radio channels broadcasting from Thiruvananthapuram are Gyanvani 105.6 MHz, Ananthapuri FM (AIR) 101.9 MHz, Big FM 92.7 MHz, Club FM 94.3 MHz, Radio Mirchi 98.3 MHz, Red FM 93.5 MHz, and Radio DC 90.4 MHz. Radio DC broadcasts at low-power CRS. This channel is only available within a 15-kilometre (9 mi) radius from the broadcasting station.

Wireline telephone services are provided by BSNL, Reliance, and Tata Indicom. The main GSM networks operating in the district are BSNL CellOne, Airtel, Tata Docomo, Idea Cellular, Vodafone, Reliance, and Virgin Mobile. The main CDMA providers are Reliance, MTS, and Tata Indicom. Major broadband internet services are provided by BSNL DataOne, Asianet Dataline, and Siti Cable.

== Sports ==
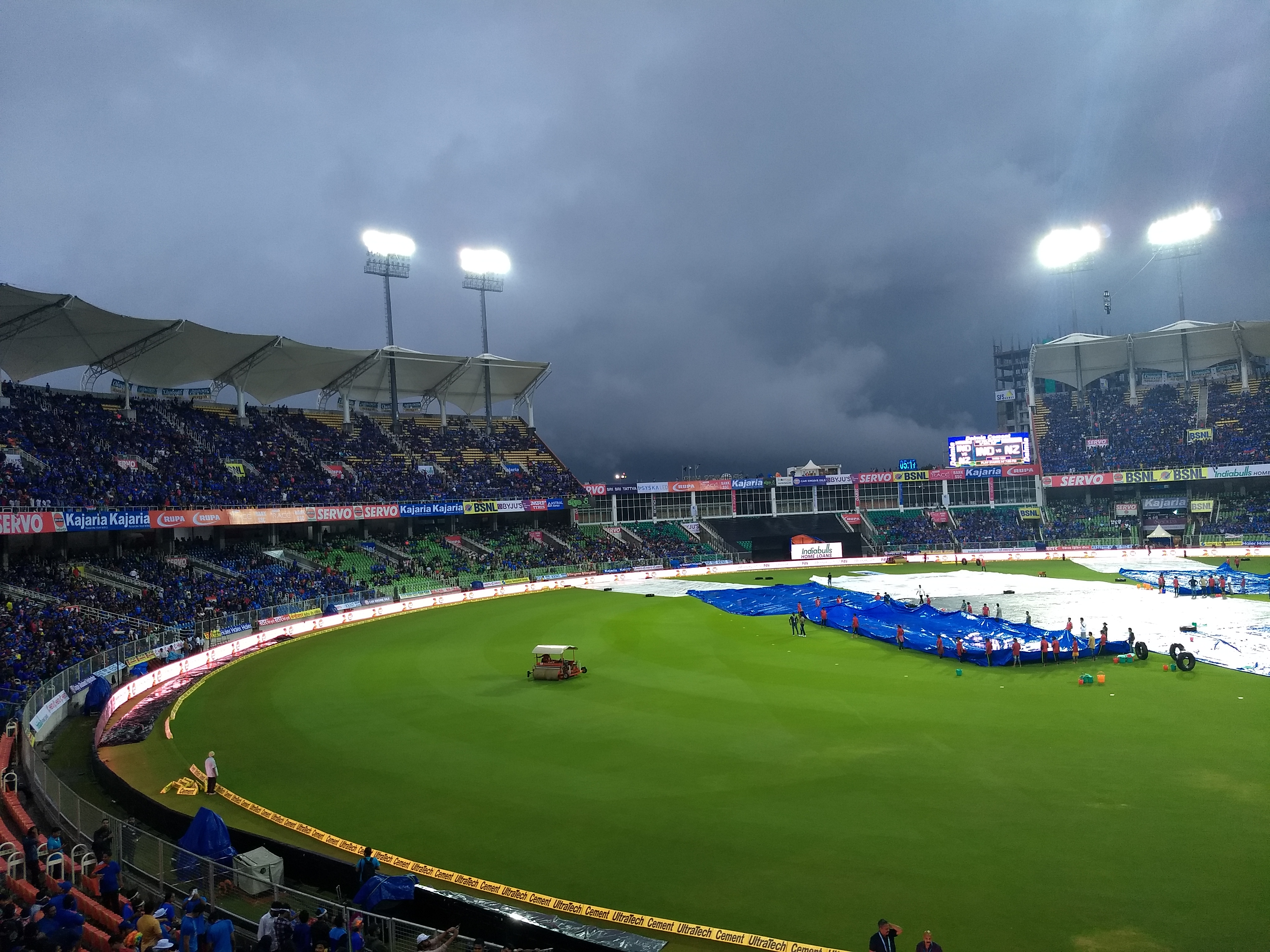
Greenfield International Stadium

The most popular sports in the district are football and cricket. Basketball, badminton and volleyball, played mostly in schools, are also popular.

The Kerala Cricket Association (KCA) is headquartered in Thiruvananthapuram city. The Chandrasekharan Nair Stadium, in city center, is a prominent football stadium and has hosted matches in national and international-level. The University Stadium, owned by the University of Kerala, is a multi purpose stadium and has hosted two international cricket matches. The Central Stadium has facilities for athletics, football, basketball, volleyball and has cricket practice nets. The Jimmy George Sports Hub is another major sports establishment in the district. The Greenfield International Stadium is one of the largest international stadia in India and can be used for both cricket & football.

== See also ==
Medical College Campus Church (Trivandrum)
