= Cherunniyoor Jayaprasad =

Indian playwright and theatre director (born 1951)

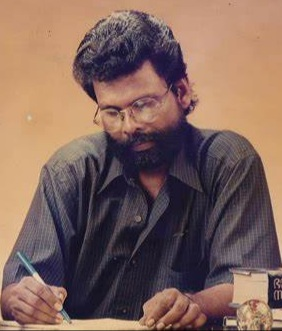
Cherunniyoor Jayaprasad

Cherunniyoor Jayaprasad (born 1951) is an Indian playwright and theatre director.

== Personal life ==
Jayaprasad was born in Cherunniyoor village to Vamadevan and Sumathi. He had his primary and secondary education at Valayantekuzhi and Varkala High School, and studied mechanical engineering at S.N. Polytechnic in Kollam. He now works as an engineer in Cochin shipyard.

== Career ==
The shipyard where Jayaprassad works has had a drama club since 1976. Jayaprassad has directed twelve plays, eight of which he has written. He has received the Kerala Sangeetha nadaka academy amateur drama award for his work. Jayaprassad has also experimented with folk theatre and epic theatre.

== Plays ==
- Typhoon (1971)
- Yagagni (1972)
- Thrayam (1974)
- Thrasam (1978)
- Spandanam (1979)
- Algibra (1980)
- Soma Saudham (1980)
- Asa Prathyasa (1981)
- Amukham (1981)
- Himarekha (1982)
- Sea Palace (1983)
- August-15 (1983)
- Asamsakal (1984)
- Sweekaranam (1984)
- Kannyakumariyil Oru Kadamkadha (1985)
- Atham Patthinu Ponnonam (1985)
- Operation Blue Star (1985)
- Rangapravasam (1985)
- Oru Koythupattinite Sangeetham (1986)
- Kashmeeril ninnoru Kavitha (1987)
- Areyum Novikkathe (1987)
- 5 Vikkattinu 365 Runs (1988)
- EE Kadha 10 num 12 num Madhea (1988)
- Ente Ammakku Ente Veettilekkoru Kshanakkattu (1989)
- Kadha parayum Silpangal (1990)
- Priya Sughruthe Nangal Vivahitharakunnu (1990)
- Snekanweshanangalode kuttiyettan.(1991)
- Purappadu (1991)
- Cover story veendum MRB (1992)
- Iniyum marikkatha Karan
- Anjana garden (1993)
- Vanayanam
- Pathinezham Sarggam (1994)
- Theeram Kasmeeram
- Nakshathrangale snehicha rathri(1995)
- Attavilakku Anayum mumps
- Yodhavu
- Flat No 144-245,(1996)
- Poypoyakalam thedi.
- Swapna radham
- Akshara slokam(1997)
- Saraswatham
- Maths Pitha Guru(1998)
- Theeram Nilayude Theeram
- Thampuran Samaksham(1999)
- Balagopalante Amma
- Nakshathrangale Snehageetham (2000)
- Punarjanmam
- Achan Makane anugrahichu (2001)
- E deepam anayathirikkatte (2002)
- Ellam marakkam onnu chirikkam (2003)
- Palma varunne Palma
- Sahrudaya Samaksham (2004)
- Swepnamkandu theerum mumpe (2005)
- Truth India T.V. channel (2006)
- Manasse née ethra Latham akale
- Evideya karayunnu Gandhi(2007)
- American divyam
- sms Vazhi Vannoru Pranayam (2008)
- Tendown express (2009)
- Ivide asokanum jeevichirunnu (2010)
- Marakkam marannoru rathri (2011)
- Our Manasasthranjante bharatha paryadanam.(2012)
- sahrudaya sadass (2013)
- Enthinanivale ingane mohippichath
- Gurukulam (2015)
- Our Sinima thirakkatha(2017)
- Kanyakumari -2 (2019)

== Awards ==
- Kerala State Award (1985, 2010, 2012)
- Kerala Sangeetha Nadaka Academy Amateur Drama Award (1995)
- All India Radio Drama Award (1997)
- Kerala State Award, Best Director (2006)
- Kerala Sangeetha Nadaka Academy Guru Pooja Award (2010)
- Kerala Sangeetha Nadaka Academy Samagra Sambhavana Puraskaram Award (2014)
