= Palachira =

- Suburb
- Location in Kerala, India Palachira (India)
- Coordinates: 8.7345663°N 76.7441415°E
- Country: India
- State: Kerala
- District: Thiruvananthapuram
- Talukas: Varkala

Government
  - Type: Panchayati raj (India)
  - Body: Gram panchayat

Languages
  - Official: Malayalam, English
- Time zone: UTC+5:30 (IST)
- PIN: 695143
- Vehicle registration: KL-81

Palachira is a suburb of Varkala Town. It is situated 2.8km south of Varkala Town. The junction is situated in Cheruniyoor panchayat of Thiruvananthapuram district in the Indian state of Kerala.
