= Kaduvakuzhy =

- village
- Location in Kerala, India Kaduvakuzhy (India)
- Coordinates: 8°37′0″N 76°55′30″E
- Country: India
- State: Kerala
- District: Thiruvananthapuram

Government
  - Type: Panchayati raj (India)
  - Body: Gram panchayat

Languages
  - Official: Malayalam, English
- Time zone: UTC+5:30 (IST)
- PIN: 695542
- Telephone code: 0472
- Vehicle registration: KL-21
- Coastline: 0 kilometres (0 mi)

Kaduvakuzhy is a small village near Vembayam, in Thiruvananthapuram, Kerala, India.
