= Veeranakavu =

- village
- Location in Kerala, India Veeranakavu (India)
- Coordinates: 8.5285°N 77.1035°E
- Country: India
- State: Kerala
- District: Thiruvananthapuram
- Talukas: Nedumangad

Government
  - Body: Gram panchayat

Population (2011)
  - Total: 26,384

Languages
  - Official: Malayalam, English
- Time zone: UTC+5:30 (IST)
- PIN: 695572
- Vehicle registration: KL-
- Sex ratio: 12 867 males and 13 517 females in 2011 ♂/♀
- Climate: (average) High Low Precipitation January 89.2 °F 71.6 °F 1.00 in February 89.8 °F 72.9 °F 0.80 in March 91.2 °F 75.6 °F 1.30 in April 91.2 °F 77.2 °F 4.90 in May 89.8 °F 76.8 °F 8.00 in June 86.0 °F 74.5 °F July 85.5 °F 73.8 °F 6.90 in August 85.3 °F 73.6 °F 6.00 in September 86.5 °F 74.1 °F 7.10 in October 86.5 °F 73.9 °F 8.80 in November 86.9 °F 73.6 °F 8.10 in December 88.5 °F 72.9 °F 2.60 in (Köppen)

Veeranakavu is a village in Thiruvananthapuram district in the state of Kerala, India.

== Demographics ==
At the 2011 India census, Veeranakavu had a population of 26384 with 12867 males and 13517 females.
