= Iroopara =

Ayiroopara Ayiroopaara
- village
- Ayiroopara
- Location in Kerala, India Ayiroopara (India)
- Coordinates: 8.586290°N 76.8976500°E
- Country: India
- State: Kerala
- District: Thiruvananthapuram
- Taluk: Thiruvananthapuram Taluk

Government
  - Body: Thiruvananthapuram Municipal Corporation and Pothencode Gram Panchayat

Population (2011)
  - Total: 23,113

Languages
  - Official: Malayalam, English
- Time zone: UTC+5:30 (IST)
- PIN: 695584
- Vehicle registration: KL-22

Ayiroopara is a village & Area in Thiruvananthapuram district in the state of Kerala, India. It is a suburb of Thiruvananthapuram city. It successfully became an "institutional area" during urban planning in 2014.

Ayiroopara Village Is In Thiruvananthapuram Corporation (Kazhakkoottam Zone) & Pothencode Grama Panchayat.

Ayiroopara Area Is In Thiruvananthapuram Corporation (Sreekaryam Zone) [Uliyazhathura Village] & Pothencode Grama Panchayat [Ayiroopara Village]

== Demographics ==
As of 2011 India census, Iroopara had a population of 23,113 with 11,163 males and 11,950 females.
