= Mannoorkara =

- village
- Location in Kerala, India Mannoorkara (India)
- Coordinates: 8.561390°N 77.126290°E
- Country: India
- State: Kerala
- District: Thiruvananthapuram
- Talukas: Kattakada

Government
  - Body: Gram panchayat

Population (2011)
  - Total: 18,343

Languages
  - Official: Malayalam, English
- Time zone: UTC+5:30 (IST)
- PIN: 6XXXXX
- Vehicle registration: KL-74

Mannoorkara is a village in Thiruvananthapuram district in the state of Kerala, India.

== Demographics ==
As of 2011 India census, Mannoorkara had a population of 18343 with 8682 males and 9661 females.
