= Kulathummal =

- village
- Location in Kerala, India Kulathummal (India)
- Coordinates: 8.5058900°N 77.080610°E
- Country: India
- State: Kerala
- District: Thiruvananthapuram

Government
  - Body: Gram panchayat

Population (2011)
  - Total: 40,448

Languages
  - Official: Malayalam, English
- Time zone: UTC+5:30 (IST)
- PIN: 695571
- Vehicle registration: KL-

Kulathummal is a village in Thiruvananthapuram district in the state of Kerala, India.

== Demographics ==
As of 2011 India census, Kulathummal had a population of 40448 with 19838 males and 20610 females.
