= Manamboor =

Manamboor Manambur
- village
- Location in Kerala, India Manamboor (India)
- Coordinates: 8.7206°N 76.7635°E
- Country: India
- State: Kerala
- District: Thiruvananthapuram
- Established: 1956
- Taluk: Varkala Taluk

Government
  - Body: Gram panchayat

Area
  - Total: 15.08 km^{2} (5.82 sq mi)

Population (2011)
  - Total: 23,198
  - Density: 1,538/km^{2} (3,984/sq mi)

Languages
  - Official: Malayalam, English
- Time zone: UTC+5:30 (IST)
- PIN: 695611
- Telephone code: 0470
- Vehicle registration: KL-81
- Website: https://village.kerala.gov.in/Office_websites/indexor.php?nm=Manamboorvillageoffice

Manambur is a village in Varkala Taluk of Trivandrum district in the state of Kerala, India. It is situated 9 km south-east of Varkala Town and 35 km north of State Capital city Trivandrum. Manamboor Subrahmanyaswami temple is famous for kavadi festival.

== Demographics ==
As of 2011 India census, Manambur had a population of 23198.
