= Ayiroor, Thiruvananthapuram =

Ayiroor
- Suburb
- Location in Kerala, India Ayiroor (India)
- Coordinates: 8.503°N 76.95219°E
- Country: India
- State: Kerala
- District: Thiruvananthapuram
- Talukas: Varkala Taluk

Government
  - Type: Panchayati raj (India)
  - Body: Gram panchayat

Area
  - Total: 18 km^{2} (6.9 sq mi)
  - Rank: 5th

Population (2011)
  - Total: 25,000
  - Density: 1,400/km^{2} (3,600/sq mi)

Languages
  - Official: Malayalam, English
- Time zone: UTC+5:30 (IST)
- PIN: 695310
- Vehicle registration: KL-81

Ayiroor (also : Ayroor) is a suburb of Varkala Town in Thiruvananthapuram district in the state of Kerala, India. It is situated 4.6 km (2.9 mi) north-east of Varkala Town along State Highway 64. The headquarters of Elakamon Panchayat is situated in Ayiroor.

This village is famous for its temples namely Anjumurthy temple, Thrimballur temple, Mambazhamoola Mahaganapathi kshethram, Palaninnapoyka Subramanyaswamy temple, Valiyaveetil Bhadrakali Temple, Ayiravilly temple, Chavarukavu appuvan kaavu and Kochu Thampuratty temple. These temples are famous for their yearly festivals conducted in between the month of January to March. The name 'Ayiroor' itself originates from 'Anjumurthy', which means five idols.

Ayiroor is on the banks of the river Ayiroorpuzha, one of the smallest rivers in Kerala after Manjeshwaram puzha. On the south-west side of this village passes the Thiruvananthapuram-Shoranur Canal. Educational institutions include Ayiroor Anganwadi, Government Upper Primary School, Government Higher Secondary School Palayamkunnu and Mahatma Gandhi Memorial Model School.

There are a few private hospitals. Varkala-Ayiroor-Parippally and Varkala-Ayiroor-Paravoor roads pass through this village. The people of Ayiroor are generally employed in the service sector. A large proportion of them work outside India. There are a few cashew nut factories in this village. The nearest railway station is in Varkala. The village has three post offices and one telephone exchange.
