= Kulaviyode =

Village in Kerala, India

Kulaviyode is a small village in Neyattinkara Taluk, Vellanad Block, the Kattakada Gram Panchayat of Thiruvananthapuram district in the Indian state of Kerala. It is a part of Ambalathinkala ward.

== Administration ==
The village comes under the Attingal Lok Sabha constituency.
