= Vettoor =

- village
- Location in Kerala, India Vettoor (India)
- Coordinates: 8°43′12.694″N 76°43′25.004″E
- Country: India
- State: Kerala
- District: Thiruvananthapuram
- Talukas: Varkala Taluk

Government
  - Body: Gram panchayat

Population (2011)
  - Total: 36,818

Languages
  - Official: Malayalam,
- Time zone: UTC+5:30 (IST)
- PIN: 695312
- Vehicle registration: KL-80

Vettoor is a panchayat in Varkala Taluk of Trivandrum district in the state of Kerala, India. It is situated 2.8km southwest of Varkala City and 38km northwest of capital city Trivandrum.

== Demographics ==
As of 2011 India census, Vettoor had a population of 36,818 with 16,409 males and 20,409 females.
