= Veiloor =

- village
- Location in Kerala, India Veiloor (India)
- Coordinates: 8°37′51″N 76°50′28″E
- Country: India
- State: Kerala
- District: Thiruvananthapuram

Government
  - Body: Gram panchayat

Population (2011)
  - Total: 22,816

Languages
  - Official: Malayalam, English
- Time zone: UTC+5:30 (IST)
- PIN: 6XXXXX
- Vehicle registration: KL-

Veiloor is a village in Thiruvananthapuram district in the state of Kerala, India.

== Demographics ==
According to the 2011 census the population of Veiloor was 22816, of which 10548 were male and 12268 were female.
