= Melthonnakkal =

- village
- Location in Kerala, India Melthonnakkal (India)
- Coordinates: 8.6341000°N 76.852070°E
- Country: India
- State: Kerala
- District: Thiruvananthapuram

Government
  - Body: Gram panchayat

Population (2011)
  - Total: 18,150

Languages
  - Official: Malayalam, English
- Time zone: UTC+5:30 (IST)
- PIN: 695317
- Vehicle registration: KL-22

Melthonnakkal is a village in Thiruvananthapuram district in the state of Kerala, India.

== Demographics ==
As of 2011 India census, Melthonnakkal had a population of 18150 with 8482 males and 9668 females.
