= Thirumala, Thiruvananthapuram =

Thirumala
- Suburb
- Location in Kerala, India
- Coordinates: 8°30′6″N 76°59′31″E
- Country: India
- State: Kerala
- District: Thiruvananthapuram

Languages
  - Official: Malayalam, English
- Time zone: UTC+5:30 (IST)
- PIN: 695006
- Telephone code: 0471
- Vehicle registration: KL-01
- Nearest city: Thiruvananthapuram
- Lok Sabha constituency: Nemom

Thirumala is a suburb of Thiruvananthapuram, the capital of Kerala, India. The name is literally split into two, 'Thiru' 'Mala' meaning "Holy Hill" which refers to the hill on which an ancient Hindu temple dedicated to the god Krishna called Parakovil which is formally known as Thrichakrapuram S Thirumala is also a huge hill, the summit of which may be reached from the Killiar at Jagathy, top most point being Parakovil.

Thirumala is close to Pangode, the cantonment area.

== Geography ==
It is located at.

== Location ==
Thirumala is on the Kattakkada – Neyyar Dam Road. It is about 6 km from Thampanoor and 2 km from Vazhuthacaud. Private and Kerala State Road Transport Corporation bus services are available from Thiruvananthapuram Central Bus Station at Thampanoor and from East Fort.

Nearest airport: Thiruvananthapuram International Airport
Nearest railway station: Thiruvananthapuram Central Railway Station

== Parakovil ==
There is a temple for Lord Krishna on top of the hill rock. The small temple has around 95 steps where the entire green Thiruvananthapuram can be seen. The temple has three shrines, Krishna as the main one and Ganesha and Ayyappa as the minor ones. The entrance has a small wish tree also. On the foot hill of the temple, there is an ashram where Goddess Devi and Lord Krishna's shrine is present. It also has a samadhi with a Siva’s shrine downstairs. It is a very peaceful place in Thiruvananthapuram City. There is also a Mahadevar Temple at Kusakkode area.
