= Keezhthonnakkal =

- village
- Location in Kerala, India Keezhthonnakkal (India)
- Coordinates: 8.652030°N 76.8701000°E
- Country: India
- State: Kerala
- District: Thiruvananthapuram

Government
  - Body: Gram panchayat

Population (2011)
  - Total: 12,379

Languages
  - Official: Malayalam, English
- Time zone: UTC+5:30 (IST)
- PIN: 6XXXXX
- Vehicle registration: KL-22

Keezhthonnakkal is a village in Thiruvananthapuram district in the state of Kerala, India.

== Demographics ==
As of 2011 India census, Keezhthonnakkal had a population of 12379 with 5873 males and 6506 females.
