= Ottoor =

- village
- Location in Kerala, India Ottoor (India)
- Coordinates: 8°43′0″N 76°46′0″E
- Country: India
- State: Kerala
- District: Thiruvananthapuram
- Talukas: Varkala Taluk

Government
  - Body: Gram panchayat

Area
  - Total: 9.47 km^{2} (3.66 sq mi)

Population (2011)
  - Total: 16,085
  - Density: 1,700/km^{2} (4,400/sq mi)

Languages
  - Official: Malayalam, English
- Time zone: UTC+5:30 (IST)
- PIN: 695611
- Vehicle registration: KL-81

Ottoor is a panchayath in Varkala Taluk of Thiruvananthapuram district in the state of Kerala, India. It is situated 7km south-east of Varkala city and 36km north of capital city Trivandrum.

== Demographics ==
As of 2011 India census, Ottoor had a population of 16085 with 7234 males and 8851 females.
