= Chemmaruthy =

- village
- Location in Kerala, India Chemmaruthy (India)
- Coordinates: 8.7597°N 76.7435°E
- Country: India
- State: Kerala
- District: Thiruvananthapuram
- Talukas: Varkala Taluk

Government
  - Body: Gram panchayat

Area
  - Total: 17.54 km^{2} (6.77 sq mi)

Population (2011)
  - Total: 32,444
  - Density: 1,850/km^{2} (4,791/sq mi)

Languages
  - Official: Malayalam, English
- Time zone: UTC+5:30 (IST)
- PIN: 695146
- Vehicle registration: KL-81

Chemmaruthy is a panchayat in Varkala Taluk of Thiruvananthapuram district in the state of Kerala, India. It is 7 km east of Varkala city centre and 40 km north of state capital Trivandrum. It is also one of the 5 panchayats that shares border with Varkala Municipality.

== Demographics ==
As of 2011 India census, Chemmaruthy had a population of 32444 with 14468 males and 16450 females.

== Geography ==
Chemmaruthy is located 11 kms away from Varkala Papanasom beach. Its once known for its rich culture of paddy farming. Its also known for Sacred groves.There are many small and large ponds in this village.
