= Madavoor-Pallickal =

Madavoor-Pallickal Madavoor
- village
- Location in Kerala, India Madavoor-Pallickal (India)
- Coordinates: 8.8058°N 76.8301°E
- Country: India
- State: Kerala
- District: Thiruvananthapuram
- Taluk: Varkala

Government
  - Body: Gram panchayat

Population (2008)
  - Total: 31,050

Languages
  - Official: Malayalam, English
- Time zone: UTC+5:30 (IST)
- PIN: 695602
- Telephone code: 0470
- Vehicle registration: KL-81
- Nearest city: Varkala
- Assembly constituency: Varkala
- Civic agency: Madvoor

Madavoor is a village located on the Kollam -Trivandrum border, which was previously part of the old Kollam district. It is now under the Varkala Taluk of the Trivandrum district in the state of Kerala, India. It is situated 7 km west of Paripally, Kollam and 18 km east of Varkala.

== Demographics ==
As of 2001 India census, Madavoor had a population of 20,855 with 9,932 males and 10,923 females.

It is located on the road connecting Kilimanoor and Nilamel (mc road) Parippally (National Highway)

Madavoor belongs to the South Kerala Division. It is located 45 km north of district headquarters Thiruvananthapuram.

Parippally, Pazhayakunnummel, Kilimanoor, Nagaroor, Chemmaruthy are the nearby villages. Nearby cities include Paravoor, Varkala, Attingal, and Kollam.

Madavoor is surrounded by Chadayamangalam Block to the east, Varkala Block to the south, Ithikkara Block to the west, and Chirayinkeezhu Block to the south.

Agriculture is the main profession in the village.

== Gramapanchayat ==
The local self-government of Madavoor consists of 15 elected members. The office is located at Mavinmoodu, near N.S.S.H.S. Madavoor.
