= Uliyazhathura =

- village
- Interactive map of Uliyazhathura
- Country: India
- State: Kerala
- District: Thiruvananthapuram

Government
  - Type: Thiruvananthapuram Corporation (India)
  - Body: Thiruvananthapuram Municipal Corporation

Population (2011)
  - Total: 28,230

Languages
  - Official: Malayalam, English
- Time zone: UTC+5:30 (IST)
- PIN: 695588, 695587, 695584
- Vehicle registration: KL- 22 (Thiruvananthapuram North SRTO)

Uliyazhathura is a village in Sreekariyam Zone, Thiruvananthapuram in the state of Kerala, India.

== Demographics ==
As of 2011 India census, Uliyazhathura had a population of 28,230, with 13,809 males and 14,421 females.
