= Navaikulam =

- village
- Location in Kerala, India Navaikulam (India)
- Coordinates: 8°46′25″N 76°47′20″E
- Country: India
- State: Kerala
- District: Thiruvananthapuram
- Taluk: Varkala Taluk

Government
  - Type: Panchayath
  - Body: Navaikulam Panchayat

Area
  - Total: 28.23 km^{2} (10.90 sq mi)

Population (2011)
  - Total: 40,702
  - Density: 1,442/km^{2} (3,734/sq mi)

Languages
  - Official: Malayalam, English
- Time zone: UTC+05:30 (IST)
- PIN: 695603
- Telephone code: 0470
- Vehicle registration: KL-81
- Nearest city: Varkala
- Niyamasabha constituency: Varkala
- Civic agency: Navaikulam Panchayat

Navaikulam is a panchayat in Varkala Taluk, it the northernmost tip of Thiruvananthapuram district in the state of Kerala, India. It is situated 11 km east of Varkala town and 37 km north of Trivandrum City along NH66. Navaikulam shares many cultural and linguistic similarities with the neighboring Kollam district or Central Travancore.

The term "navaya" means "the place where Vedic scriptures are taught". Therefore, it is believed that Navaikulam was an ancient center of excellence and wisdom. The Sankaranarayana temple is situated here.

== Demographics ==
As of 2001 India census, Navaikulam had a population of 27703 with 13084 males and 14619 females.

== Sankaranarayana temple ==
The Sri Sankaranarayana temple at Navaikulam in Varkala Taluk of Trivandrum district is located by the side of National Highway 66 (about 45 km north of Trivandrum) between Kallambalam and Parippally. Set amidst a vast campus, the temple enshrines the syncretic image of Sankaranarayana, whose left half shows the attributes of Vishnu and the right half that of Siva, this is believed to be the biggest Shankaranarayana statue in standing position. It is one of the most famous pilgrim center in Thiruvananthapuram district. Near the temple there is a big pond. This temple is 1000 years old.

== Schools ==
Govt HSS Navaikulam is a school in the Attingal education district. Approximately 2000 students are enrolled in the school, which is staffed by around 80 teachers.
