= Menamkulam =

Village in Kerala, India

Menamkulam is a suburb and a Village in Trivandrum City the capital of state of Kerala, India. It is the part of Kadinamkulam Panchayat. The headquarters of women's battalion of Kerala Police is situated in menamkulam.

It is 4 kilometres (2.5 mi) Technopark and Kazhakoottam railway station.

Menamkulam was home for 2015 national games. Institutions like Kinfra industrial park, Marian Educity and St. Xavier college are located here..The main attraction of this place is the Thookam festival of Sree Palkara Bhagavathy Temple[aka Elayil Temple]which is being held in the month of March–April where people from various places visit to see it.

List of temples and churches:

- Bethel Marthoma Church
- Sree Palkara Bhagavathy Temple
- Vilayil Sree Mahavishnu Thampuran Temple
- Naagamandalam Sree Dharmasastha Temple
- Ardhanaareeshwara Samadhi Temple

== Demographics ==
As of 2011 India census, Kazhakkoottam-Menamkulam (village) {Now Menamkulam Village}. had a population of 17,608, with 8,371 males and 9,237 females.
