= Varkala Taluk =

Taluk in Trivandrum district

- Taluk
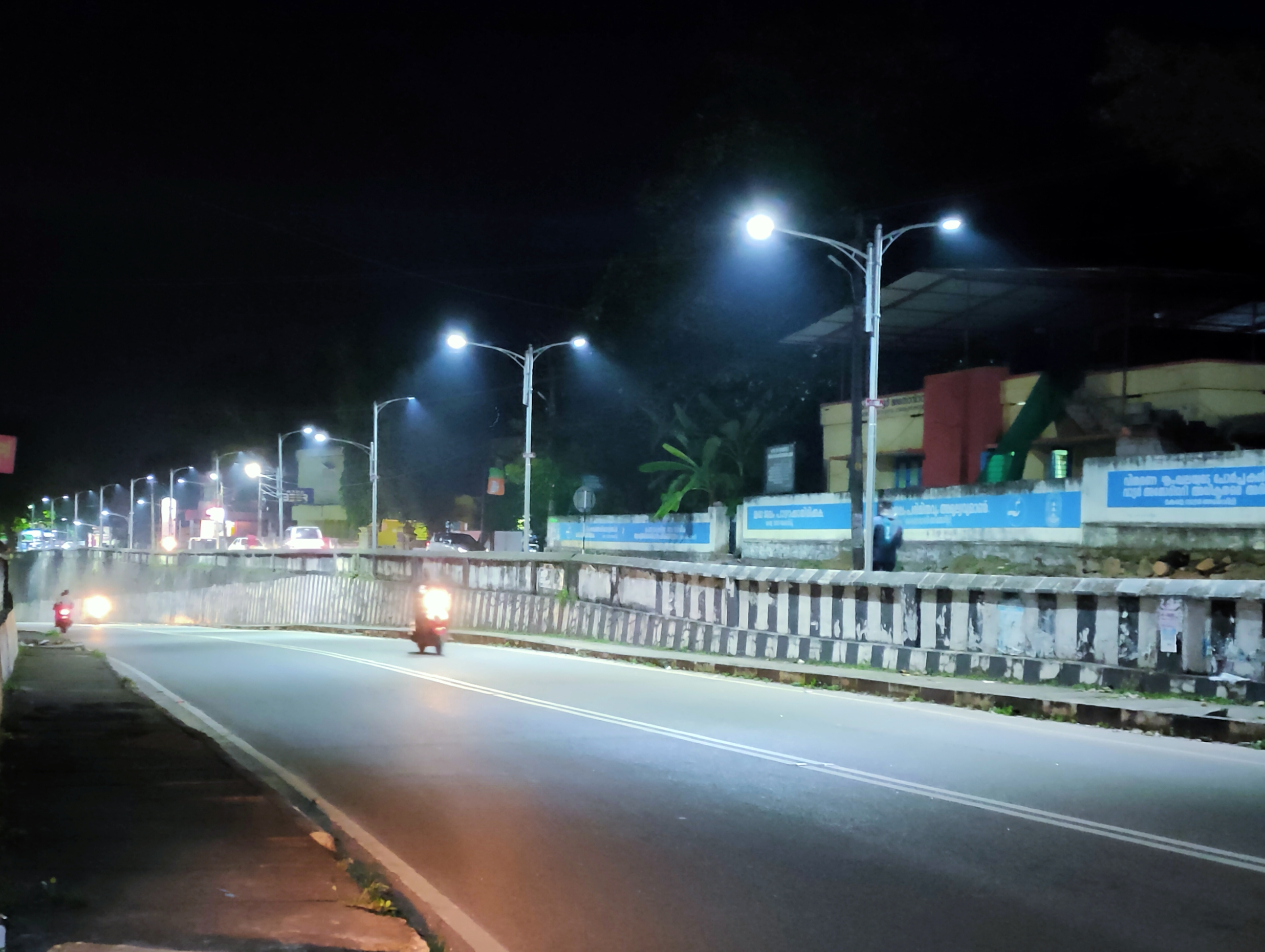
- Varkala Underpass Road

- Location in Kerala, India
- Coordinates: 8.734°N 76.725°E
- Country: India
- State: Kerala
- District: Thiruvananthapuram
- Established: 2014
- Founder: Government of Kerala
- Headquarters: Varkala

Government
  - Body: Subdistrict

Area
  - Total: 177.16 km^{2} (68.40 sq mi)
  - Rank: 6th
- Elevation: 58 m (190 ft)

Population (2011)
  - Total: 278,587
  - Rank: 6th
  - Density: 1,572.5/km^{2} (4,072.8/sq mi)

Languages
  - Official: Malayalam
- Time zone: UTC+5:30 (IST)
- Postal code: 695141
- IN Telephone code: 0470
- Vehicle registration: KL-81

Varkala Taluk is a Taluk (tehsil) situated in the northernmost tip of Thiruvananthapuram district in the Indian state of Kerala. It is the 3rd most densely populated taluk in the district comprising 10 villages and Varkala municipality. Spanning an area of about 177.16 km^{2}, Varkala Taluk is home to over 9% of total population of Thiruvananthapuram district. Varkala is the taluk headquarters and the largest town of the taluk.

== Revenue villages ==
- Varkala (M)
- Edava
- Pallickal
- Navaikulam
- Chemmaruthy
- Cherunniyoor - Vettoor
- Kudavoor
- Manamboor
- Ottoor
- Madavoor
- Ayiroor
- Vettoor

== Educational institutions ==
- SN College Varkala
- SR Medical College Akathumuri
- Sree Shankara Dental College
- SN Nursing College Varkala
- VK College of Engineering and Technology Chavercode
- SN Training College Nedunganda
- Asan Memorial Teacher Training Institute Vettoor
- CHMM College Chavercode
- University Institute of Management Varkala
- Govt ITI Varkala
- Govt ITI Varkala (SC)
- University Institute of Technology Pallickal

== Railway stations ==
- Varkala
- Edava
- Kappil
- Akathumuri

== Transportation ==
- Road

NH66 is passing through the Varkala Taluk connecting major cities in India like Mumbai, Thiruvananthapuram, Mangalore, Kochi etc.

SH64 originating from Varkala City connect major towns in Kollam district.

Thiruvananthapuram - Kasargod Coastal Highway is passing through the Varkala Town.

- Rail

Taluk consist of 1 major (Varkala) and 3 minor (Kappil, Edava, Akathumuri) railway stations. Varkala railway station serving the taluk is 2nd busiest in the district after Thiruvananthapuram Central Railway Station and 8th busiest railway station in the Thiruvananthapuram division. Varkala Railway Station is well connected to major cities & towns in India like Delhi, Hyderabad, Mumbai, Pune, Goa, Kolkata, Bangalore, Chennai, Visakhapatnam, Thiruvananthapuram, Kochi, Madurai, Coimbatore, Bhopal, Vijayawada, Nilambur etc.

- Air

Thiruvananthapuram International Airport is 39 km from Varkala Town is the nearest airport for Varkala Taluk. Varkala also has its own helipad in the town built in 1980.
