= Neyyar =

Neyyar may refer to:

- Neyyar (river), a river in Kerala, India
  - Neyyar Dam
  - Neyyar Safari Park
  - Neyyar Wildlife Sanctuary
