= Agasthyavanam Biological Park =

Wildlife sanctuary in India

first biological Park
- Interactive map of first biological Park
- Location: India
- Coordinates: 24.592°N 73.652°E
- Area: Kottur, Thiruvananthapuram District, Kerala State, India
- Established: 1997
- Governing body: India

Agasthyavanam Biological Park is a protected area in the Western Ghats in Kerala State, India. The park is located within Vazhichal Panchiyat and lies between the Neyyar and Peppara Wildlife Sanctuaries which covers an area of about 31 square kilometres (12 sq mi).

== History ==
After decades of environmental degradation, the Government of India (GOI) formed a committee in 1992 to look into the possibility of a biological park in the region of Kottur in Kerala. In the year 1997, the Agasthyavanam Biological Park was formed. Located near the state's capital city of Thiruvananthapuram, the park is named after the mountain peak that rises up from the centre of the park. The park was established as part of the Agasthyavanam Project to conserve the flora and fauna of the region and ensure the recovery of the delicate ecological balance which was damaged over the decades. Conservatories have been planned for breeding and reintroducing rare, endangered endemic animals into the forest.

Buses run regularly from Thiruvananthapuram to the park, although only 50 tourists are allowed inside the park each day. Trekking facilities are also available, with the pathway up to the Agasthyamalai peak often cited as the most sought-after pass.

== Agasthyamalai Biosphere Reserve ==
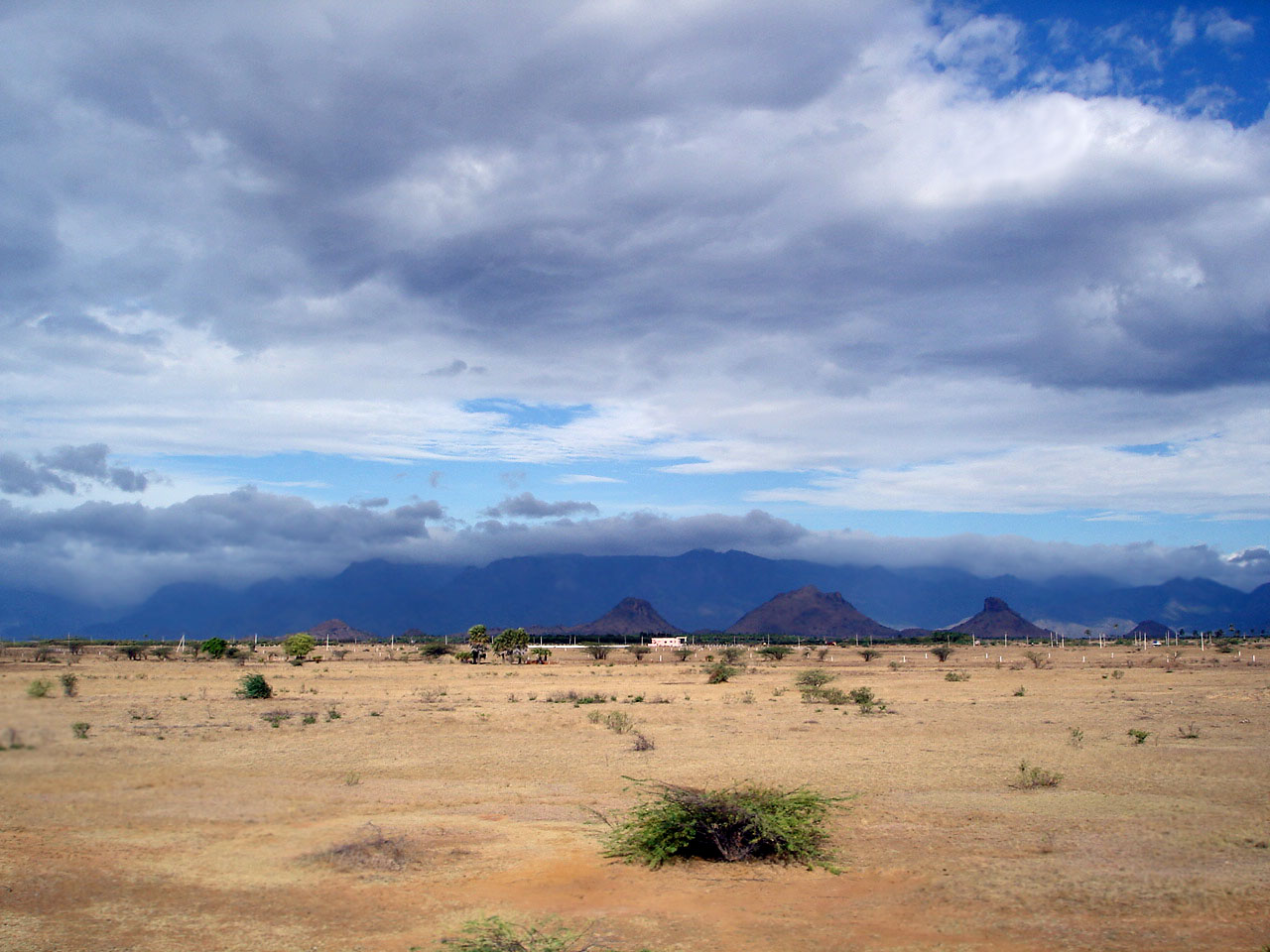
The Agasthiyamalai range in the Western Ghats.

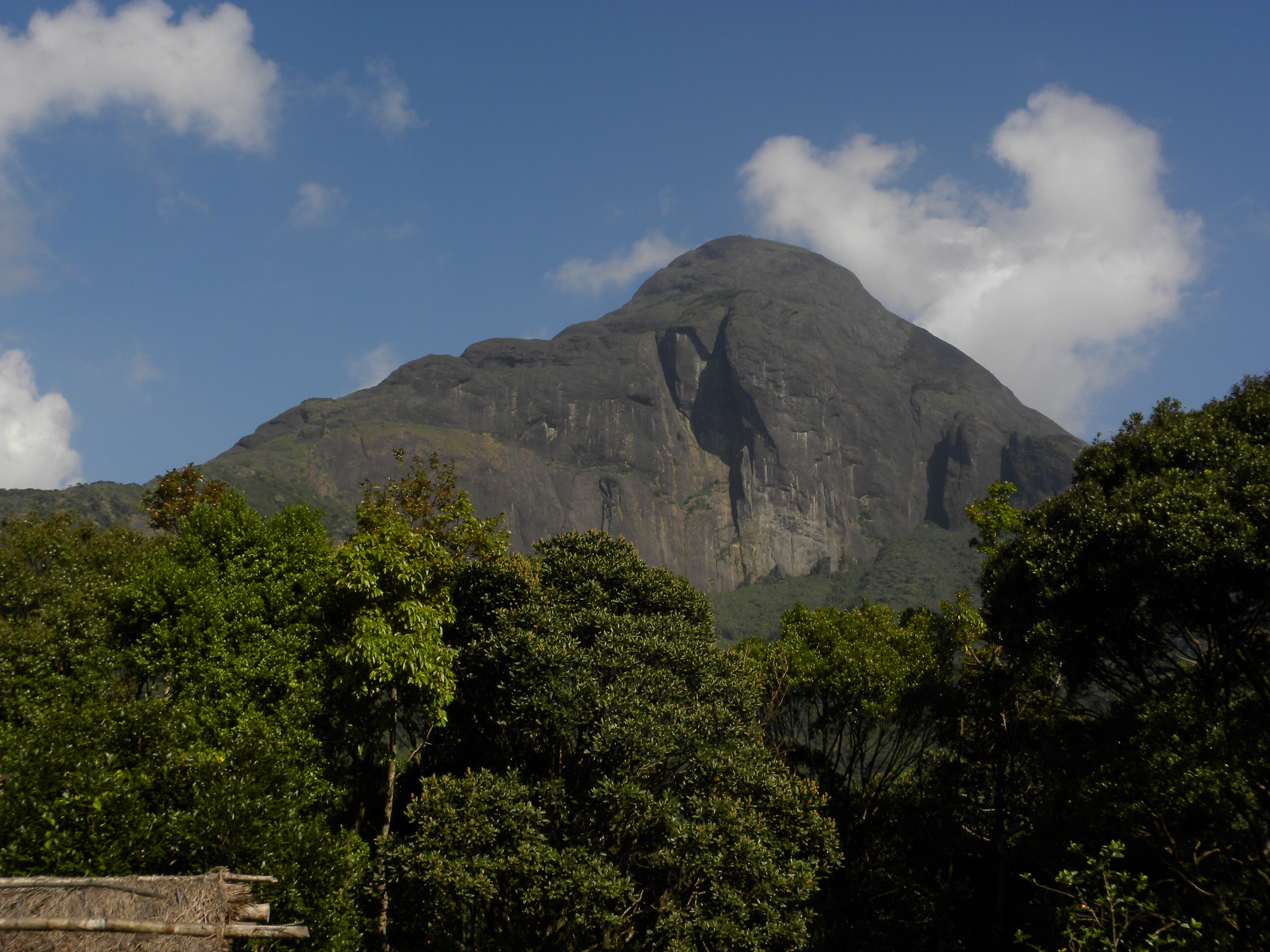
Agasthyakoodam Peak

The Agasthyamalai Biosphere Reserve (ABR) was recognized on 12 November 2001, under UNESCO's Man and Biosphere Programme. The ABR falls exclusively in Kerala, covering an area of 1701 km^{2}. The forest tracts of Neyyar, Peppara, and Shendumey Wildlife Sanctuaries are included in the ABR.

Both a local committee and a state-level Biosphere Management Committee were constituted in accordance with the Government of India (GOI) guidelines for the coordination of various department activities in the B.R. area and for ensuring the scientific management of the B.R.

1. 1,381 hectares (3,410 acres) of the area were evicted from Mathikettan Shola and declared as a National Park.
2. Including Agasthyamala, 1,701 km^{2} (657 sq mi) area were declared as Agasthyamala Biosphere Reserve.

=== The Agasthyavanam Project ===
In 1992, the Government of Kerala created a scientific committee to study the feasibility of setting up a biological park in the highly degraded forest area of Kottoor at Kuttichal Panchiyat. The committee suggested that the ultimate objective of the endeavor be to regenerate, conserve, and propagate selected wild flora and fauna. The area earmarked for the project had a negligible tree and animal population despite its abundant water resources, its fertile soil and favorable climate.

The Kottoor reserve forests lie in the Paruthipalli range of the Trivandrum forest division which itself lies on the western slopes of the Western Ghats, at the southeast corner in Nedumangad Taluk in Kuttichal Panchayat. It is contiguous with the Neyyar Wildlife Sanctuary on the southwest borders and the Peppara Wildlife Sanctuary in the northeast. However, it was not included in any of these existing sanctuaries due to its high level of degradation.

The Agasthyamala Biosphere Reserve is located in the southernmost end of the Western Ghats and incorporates peaks rising 1,868 m (6,129 ft) above sea level. It covers 3,500 km and encompasses tropical forest ecosystems that fall within the Tirunelveli and Kanyakumari districts of Tamil Nadu and the Thiruvananthapuram and Kollam districts of Kerala.

The total estimated area of the park is 23 km^{2} (8.9 sq mi). Of this, 17.5 km^{2} (6.8 sq mi) is to be converted to thick jungle, while the rest is for manipulative conservation programs. Conservatories will be established for a variety of plant species and for the reintroduction, production, breeding, and propagation of wild animals and birds.

In spite of the good rainfall received, the quick drainage of water from the area to the Arabian Sea leaves the place barren for around six months of the year. Small check dams, if built, can retain water in small ponds and preserve the humidity and moisture, promoting vegetation growth in the dry season. Through its full implementation the Agasthyavanam Project is expected to promote ecotourism, afforestation, and conservation.

=== Objectives of the Project ===
1. Regeneration and eco-restoration of the degraded forest of Kottoor Reserve.
2. Scientific conservation of the existing flora and fauna.
3. To create maximum biodiversity by reintroducing the extinct endemic species.
4. To achieve maximum, sustainable utilization of water and soil.
5. To facilitate documentation of flora and fauna.
6. To encourage research and eco-tourism.
7. To improvise the dying flora and fauna
