= Karamana River =

River in Kerala, India

Karamana River Karamanayar
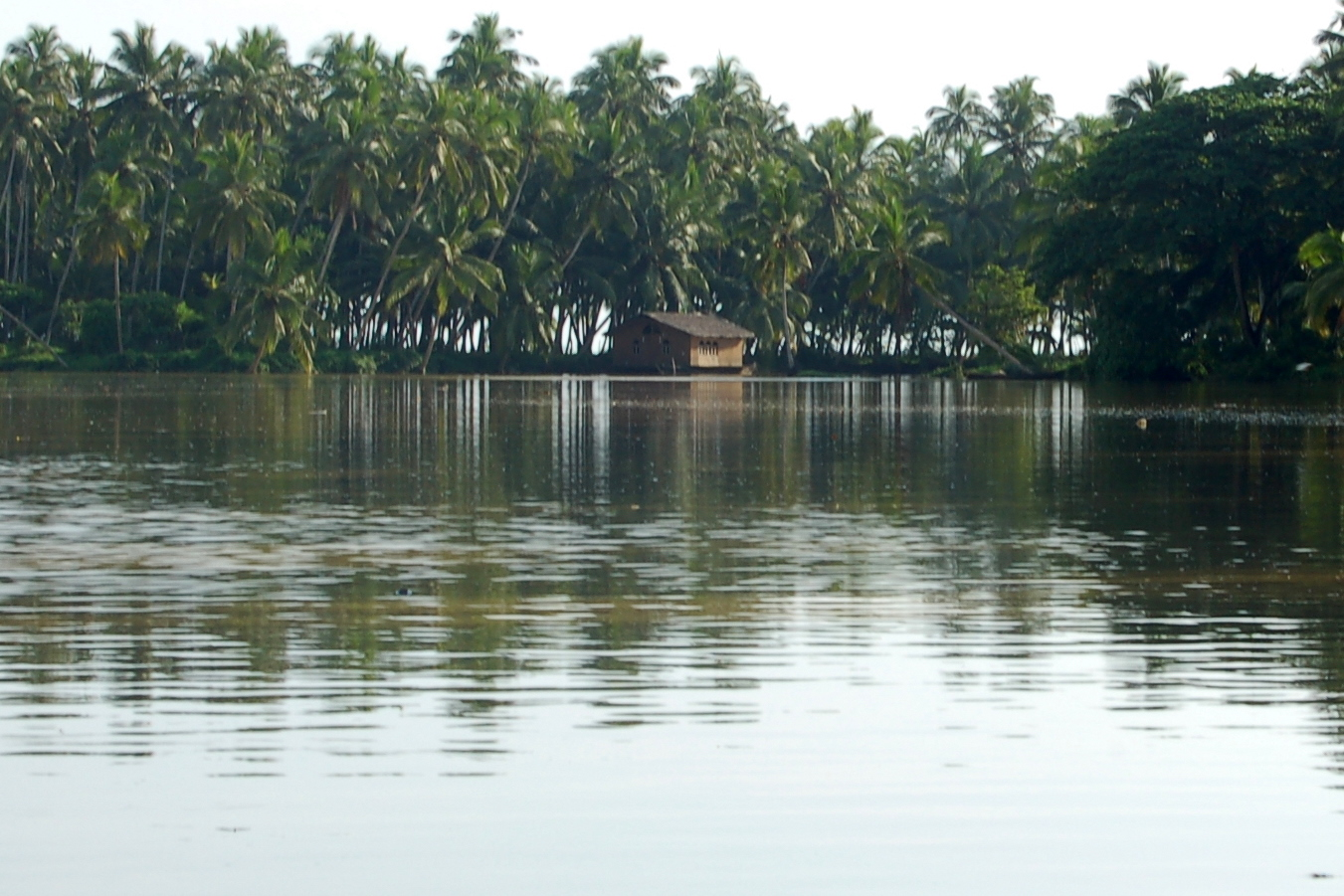
- Karamana river at Kovalam

- Location of the mouth in Kerala Karamana River (India)
- Etymology: Named after Karamana, a suburb of Thiruvananthapuram
- Native name: കരമനയാർ (Malayalam)

Location
- Country: India
- State: Kerala
- District: Thiruvananthapuram

Physical characteristics
- Source: Western Ghats
  - location: Agastyarkoodam
- Mouth: Arabian Sea
  - location: Kovalam
  - coordinates: 8°25′33″N 76°57′30″E
- Length: 66 km (41 mi)

Karamana is a river flowing through the city of Thiruvananthapuram in Kerala, India. The river starts near the southern tip of the Western Ghats(Sahyadri Mountains) at Agastyar Koodam. The river flows 66 km westward and merges with the Arabian Sea at Panathura near Kovalam. The river gets its name from Karamana, a suburb of Thiruvananthapuram city, through which it flows.

The catchment area is mostly forested, command area is under mixed dry land crops such as coconut, tapioca, pepper, plantain, rice, etc.

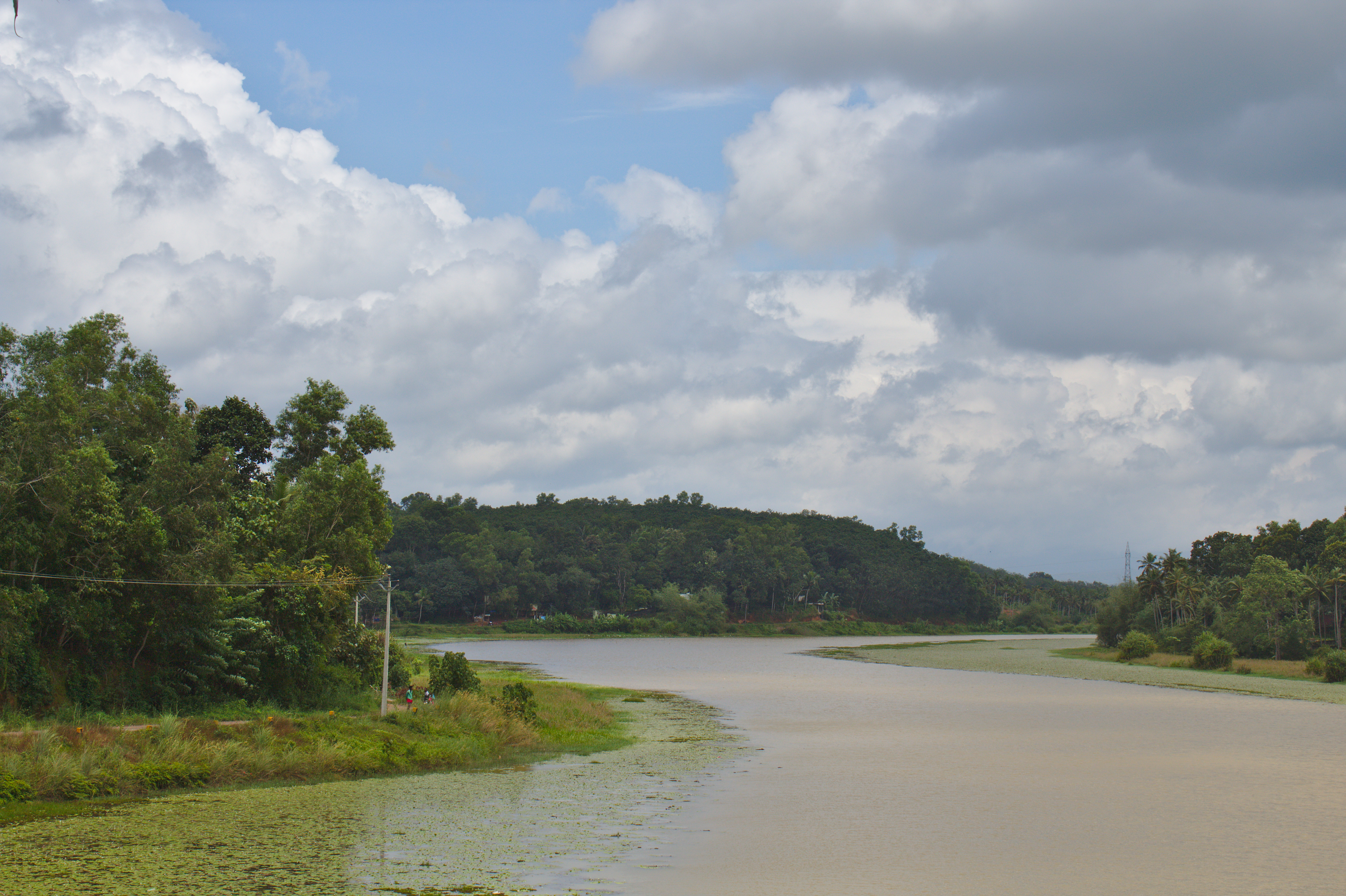
Karamana River near Aruvikkara Dam

== Course ==
The Karamana River originates from the Agasthya Mala in the Western Ghats part of the Thiruvananthapuram district. Karanamana initially flows through the Peppara Wildlife Sanctuary and into the Peppara reservoir. It then flows through several hilly eastern towns of Thiruvananthapuram district namely, Meenankal, Cherappally, Utharamcode, Aryanad, Uzhamalackal, Mundela, Perumkulam and Aruvikkara. The Aruvikkara dam is built across the Karamana river at Aruvikkara. Downstream the river enters the Travancore plains and passes towns like Irumpa, Nettayamam, Peyad, Karimankulam, Perukavu, Vilavoorkkal, Choozhattukotta, Pappanamcode, Nemom and Thiruvallam. At Thiruvallam, the Karamana river divides into two distributaries. The northern distributary empties into the Arabian Sea near Poonthura and the southern distributary flows into the Pozhikkara estuary. The Edayar Island is situated between the two distributaries.

== Tributaries and Distributaries ==
The Karamana rises in the vicinity of the Agasthiarkoodam about 1600 m above the sea level. The peaks of origin of the river are today known as Chemmunji Motta and Aathiramala and its upper tributary rivers are the Kaaviyaar, Attayaar, Vaiyappadyaar and Thodayaar. The river flows for 66 kilometers in a south - southwest direction before flowing into the Arabian Sea.

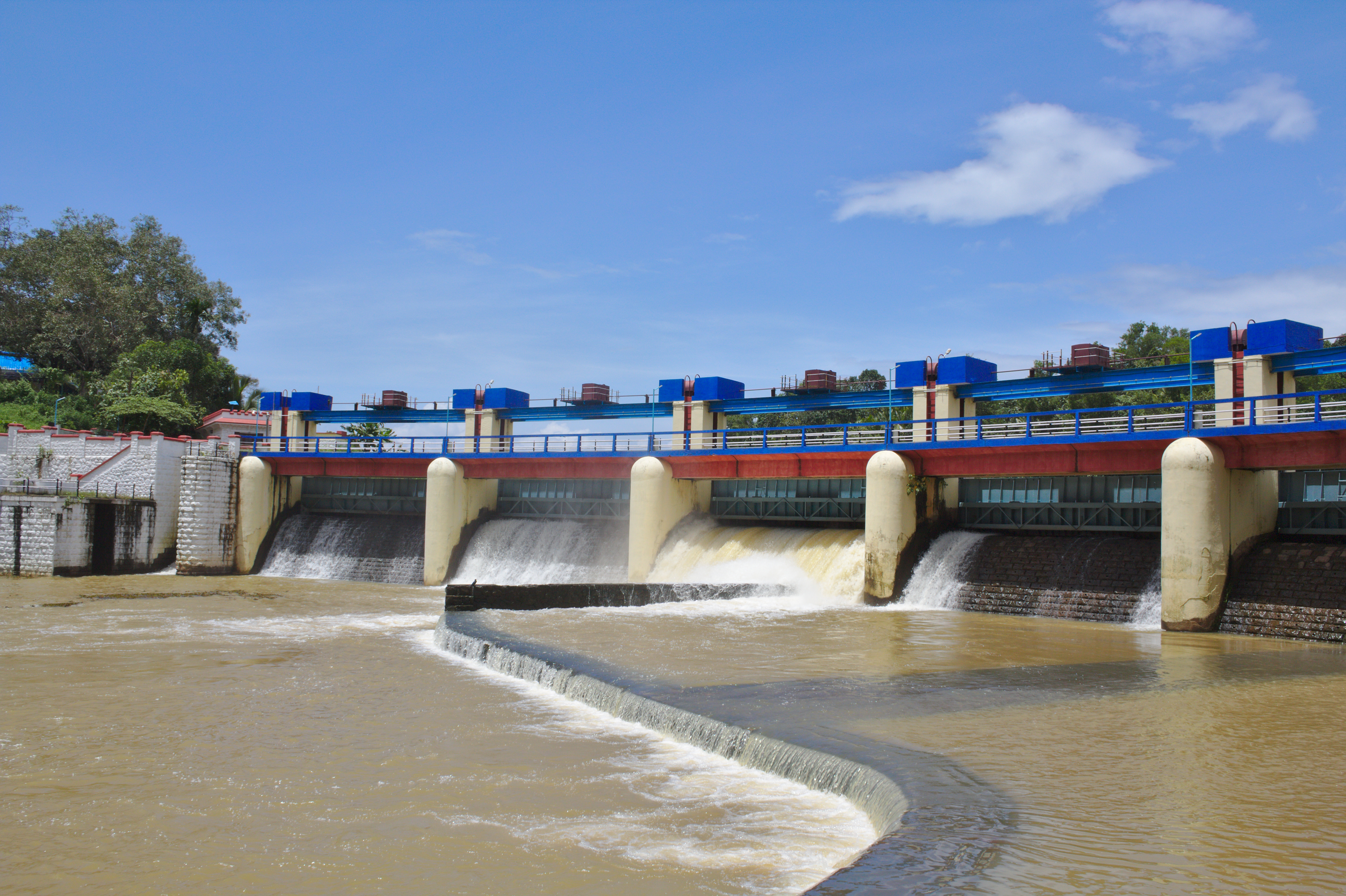
Aruvikkara Dam on Karamana River

The largest tributary of the Karamana is the Killiyar, which flows for a distance of 24 kilometres. It has five anicuts on it which regulates the flow of water. Part of the water was diverted into the Kochar channel which in turn fed the Pathrakulam pond (no longer exists) adjacent to current Padmatheerthakulam outside the Padmanabhaswamy Temple. There are several temples located along the Killiyar's banks, the most famous of which is the Attukal Temple. The Killiyar drains the Nedumangad forest and its basin is rich in avian fauna.Killiyar merges with Karamana river at Pallathukadavu near Thiruvallam.Karamana river merges with the Arabian Sea through the Pozhikkara estuary. In its final lap, the river runs parallel to the sea and the river here is known as the Edayar.

== Dams ==
The Karamana river has two important dams on it. These are the Aruvikkara Dam, built in the 1930s and the Peppara Dam which lies further upstream and was built in 1983. The Aruvikkara Dam was completed with the aim of providing piped drinking water to the city. The Trivandrum Water Works, inaugurated by and named after Lord Willingdon in 1933, is in charge of receiving and distributing the Karamana's waters to the city even today. A JICA funded project is under way to augment the water distribution network in the city. The Peppara Dam regulates the flow of water into the Aruvikkara Dam by unifying all the upper tributaries of the Karamana river. The Peppara Dam has played a crucial role in eliminating the floods that once used to characterized the Karamana. There is also a 3 MW hydel power station at Peppara.

== Bridges ==
The Karamana river has several bridges across it. The largest is at Karamana itself, where the NH-66 crosses it. This was built by Lt Col. Horsley, the author of the earliest English treatise on history of Travancore, and inaugurated in 1853. Other important bridges are at Thrikkunnapuram, Mangattu Kadavu, Kundamon Kadavu - Peyad, Vellaikadavu - Puliyarakonam, Kulashekaram-Peyad, Jagathi bridge, Aryanad bridge, Aruvikkara (on the dam), Maruthoor kadavu.

== Biodiversity ==
The Karamana river basin supports a range of plants that are typical of the tropics. These include the wild cane, bamboo, mangroves, water lilies and coconut trees. The screw pine or pandanus is another common species along the river's banks. The Cerbera odollam, called Othalam in Malayalam, is found along the lower reaches of the river. Fish species found in the Karamana include Karimeen, Chekkaali, Kariyida, Paruminali, Cherumeen, Vaala, Nedumeen, Aaral, Maalavu and Paaval.

== Ecological Concerns ==
The Karamana has been facing the problems of pollution, acidification and fish kill in recent years. The causes for the deterioration in the river's water quality include the discharge of untreated sewage and domestic and industrial effluents into the river and the unregulated development of tourism in the river basin area. This has resulted in the lowering of dissolved oxygen levels in the river's water and caused fish kill downstream of the river. Illegal mining of river sand is another significant threat being faced by the river.

== In Literature and Music ==
The beauty of the Karamana and the fact that it wound through forests earned the river the name Vanamala, the garland of the forest, in Sanskrit. It is referred to as the ‘Makaraakara’ river in the Jain ascetic Udyodana Suri's 8th century Prakrit text Kuvalayamaala. The Karamana river also closely influenced the development of music in Kerala. Some of the singers, instrumentalists and composers who are associated with the river include Irayimman Thampi, Vadivelu, Neelakanta Sivan and K S Chitra. Besides, the composer-king Swathi Thirunal was also influenced by the river's scenic beauty. Over a dozen of his court musicians hailed from the Karamana village on the banks of the river.
