= Neyyar (river) =

River in Kerala, India

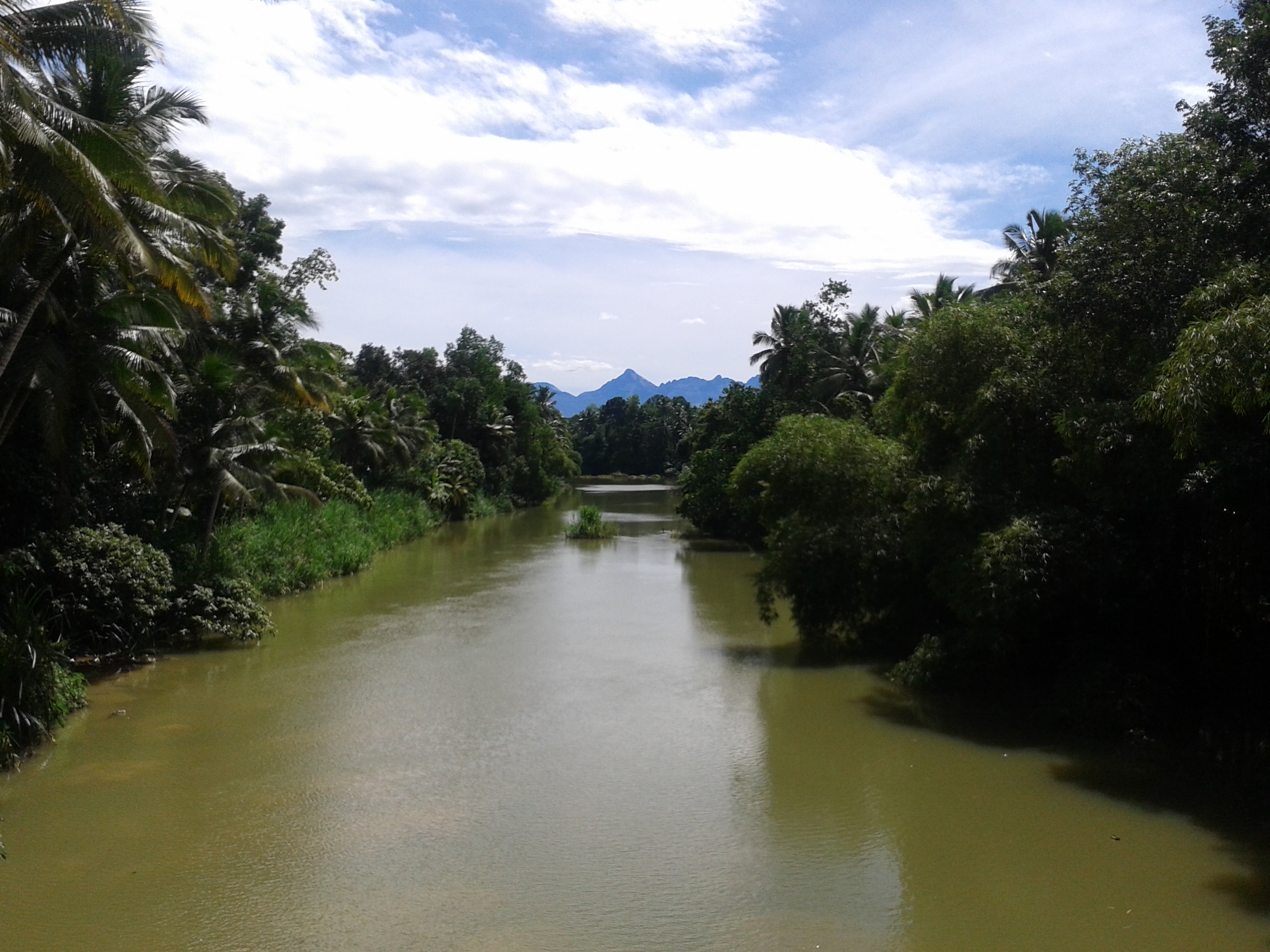

- Location of the mouth in Kerala Neyyar (river) (India)
- Native name: നെയ്യാർ (Malayalam)

Location
- Country: India
- State: Kerala
- District: Thiruvananthapuram

Physical characteristics
- Source: Western Ghats
  - location: Agastyarkoodam
  - elevation: 1,860 m (6,100 ft)
- Mouth: Arabian Sea
  - location: Poovar
  - coordinates: 8°18′32″N 77°04′45″E
  - elevation: 10 m (33 ft)
- Length: 56 km (35 mi)

Basin features
- Landmarks: Aruvikkara Sastha Temple; Neyyattinkara Sree Krishna Swami Temple
- Cities: Kallikkad; Neyyattinkara; Poovar
- Waterbodies: Neyyar dam
- Bridges: Kallikkadu bridge Mandapathinkadavu bridge Moonnattumukku bridge Keezharoor bridge Aruvikkara bridge Mampazhakkara bridge Aruvippuram bridge Arakunnu bridge Palakkadavu bridge Amaravila bridge Pazhayakada bridge Bypass bridge Vlathankara; Mavilakkadavu bridge Poovar bridge

The Neyyar River is 56 km long river which flows through the Thiruvananthapuram district of Kerala in India. It flows from the Agastya Mala (Agastyarkoodam) in the Western Ghats. The town Neyyattinkara in Thiruvananthapuram district, is situated on the banks of the river, is named after this river. The river flows through the Neyyar wildlife sanctuary and into the Neyyar resorvoir. It then flows towards the west through the settlements of Kallikkad, Kattakkada, Ottashekharamangalam, Mandapathinkavadu, Keezharoor, Perumkadavilla, Aruvipuram, Neyyantinkara and Thirupuram. The river then empties into the Arabian Sea at the Poovar estuary. Tributaries include the Kallar, Mullayar, and the Karavaliyar. It has several small canals along the river and the Neyyar Irrigation Project, "Neyyar Dam", is situated in this river. A safari park is located near the river. Neyyar river has been severely affected by sand mining.

The catchment area is mostly forested, command area is under mixed dry land crops such as coconut, tapioca, pepper, plantain, rice, etc.
