= Vava Suresh =

Indian wildlife conservationist (born 1974)

- വാവ സുരേഷ്
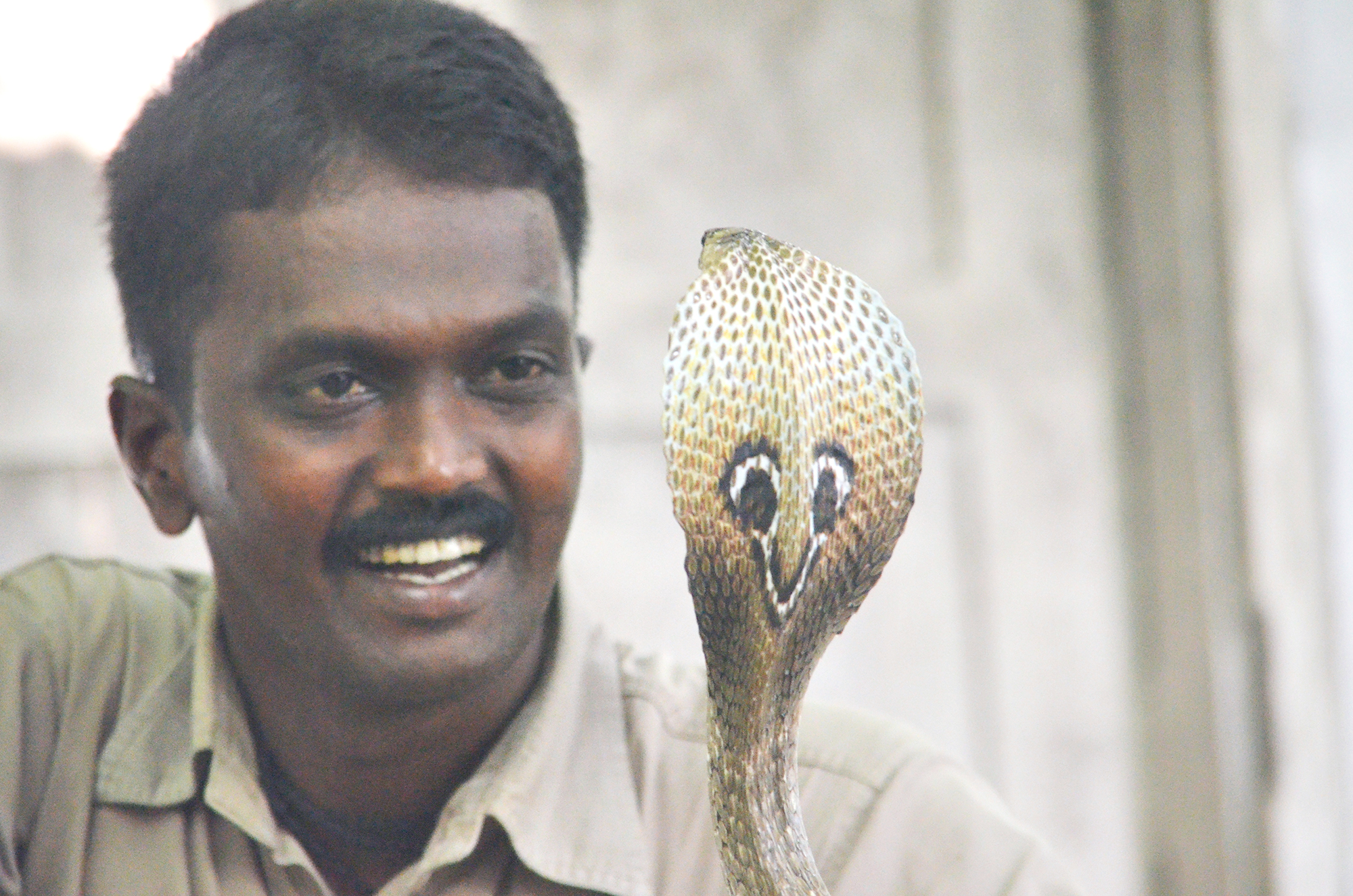
- Suresh in 2016
- Born: 1974 (age 51–52); Thiruvananthapuram, Kerala, India
- Other names: Vasur, Snake Master
- Occupations: Wildlife conservationist; Social worker
- Known for: Snake capturing and wildlife conservation
- Parents: Bahuleyan; L. Krishnamma
- Website: www.youtube.com/c/VavaSureshOfficial

Vava Suresh (born 1974) is an Indian wildlife conservationist and a snake expert. He is known for his mission of saving snakes that have strayed into human-inhabited areas in Kerala, India. He has captured 200 (as of November 2020) King cobras, and is believed to have captured and rescued more than 38,000 straying snakes.

He hosts a snake capturing programme called "Snake Master" on Kaumudy TV. Throughout his work, he has survived many venomous snakebites, some of which caused him to be hospitalized, and placed on a ventilator or treated in the ICU. He is the first person in the world to conduct a snake awareness class. He has conducted snake awareness classes in schools with live snakes. Suresh has conducted more than 10,000 awareness classes in schools, colleges, and police camps.

== Conservation activities ==
Suresh is widely known for his conservation activities like the rescue and release of endangered species of snakes, preservation of collected eggs until they hatch, and creating awareness about snakes and their behaviour. He releases his reptile collections into natural habitats at regular intervals of time. His efforts to capture venomous snakes from human-populated areas and educate people about snakes and their behaviour are widely acknowledged.

== Rejection of Forest Department job offer ==
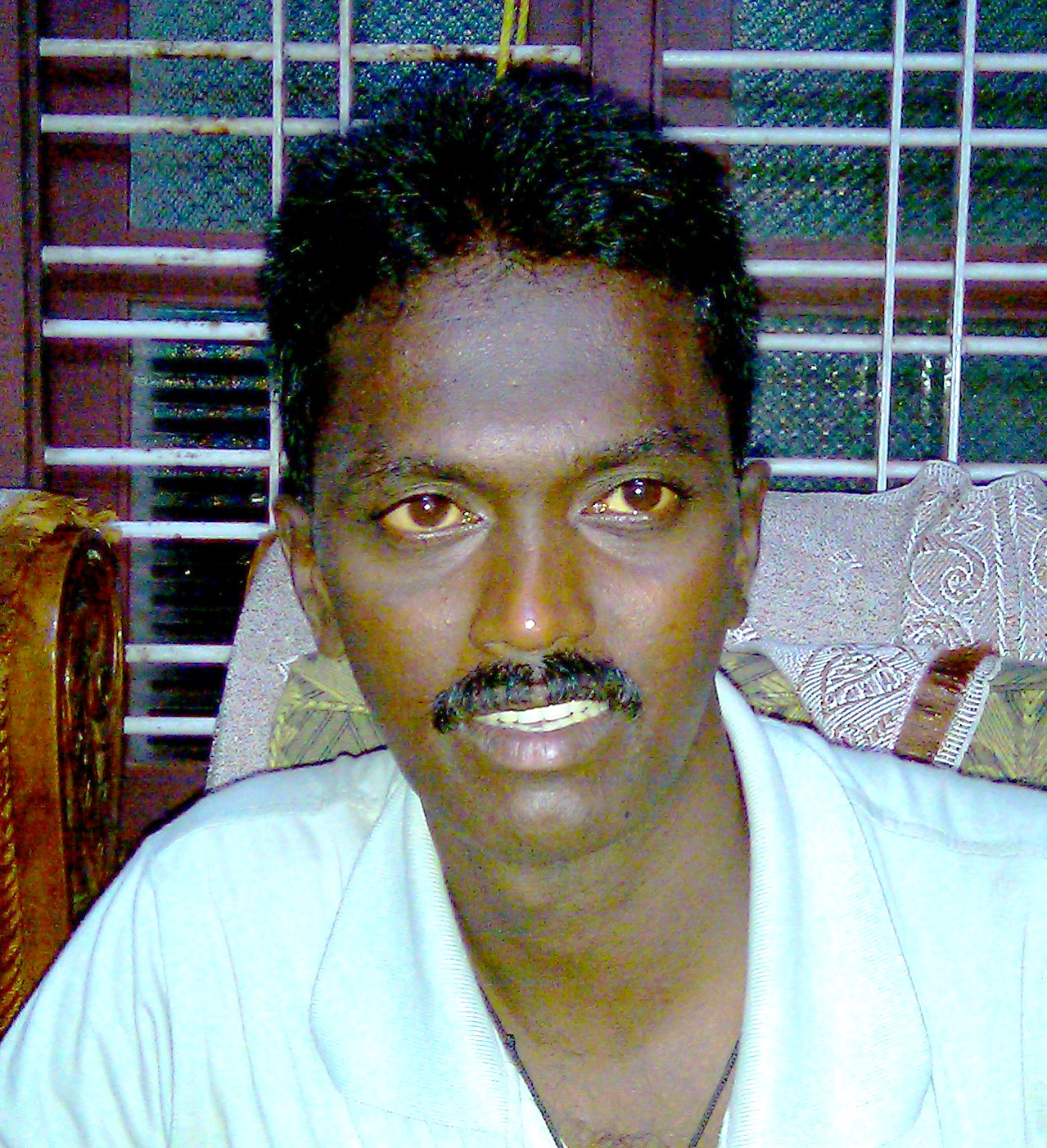
Vava Suresh at Pandalam in 2011

In recognition of his services to society and his efforts in conserving various vulnerable species of snakes endemic to the state, Suresh was offered a government job in 2012 by minister K. B. Ganesh Kumar, at the snake park that would be set up at the Kottur forest area near Kattakada in Thiruvananthapuram. Suresh declined, stating that he would be prevented from helping the society in his usual manner, if he accepted the position.

== Snakebite incidents ==
During his long career of conservation activities, he has been bitten by snakes numerous times. According to an interview by the news channel ABP Majha, conducted on 5 June 2012, Suresh admitted to being kept on a ventilator twice and in ICU four times. In all, he has survived more than 300 venomous snakebites. He was hospitalized in August 2013 for a lethal bite. On 20 June 2015, he was hospitalized for a cobra bite, and on 13 February 2020, he suffered a serious Russell's viper bite. On 31 January 2022, at Kottayam, he was bitten by a cobra above the knee on his right thigh, while trying to bag it. He was admitted to the Government Medical College in Kottayam. This was considered as the worst snakebite incident that happened to him.

== Expert testimony ==
Suresh provided a statement to the police regarding the habits and abilities of Indian cobras and Russell's vipers in connection to the death of Uthra, a young wife and mother, who was killed by a snakebite inflicted while she was asleep on 7 May 2020, in Anchal, Kerala. It was later determined that her husband had attempted to murder her, first with a Russell's viper, and next, with an Indian cobra, succeeding in the second attempt.

== Recognition ==
Suresh was awarded the 'Vocational Service Award 2011' instituted by the Rotary Club's Thiruvananthapuram division. He was selected for his service to society for many years.

In November 2013, during his visit to Kerala, Britain's Prince Charles expressed his desire to meet Vava Suresh and a rendezvous was arranged in Vazhachaal in Thrissur.

== Criticism ==
He has been criticised by forest department officials and social media users for not complying with safety guidelines during snake rescues by posing a danger to himself, other people, and to the snakes themselves. Many say that the snakes he has caught are unlikely to survive due to injuries caused by his unscientific handling of them. The numerous bites he has received during snake rescues are interpreted by some as evidence that he doesn't know to handle snakes safely.

== See also ==
- Kerala snakebite murder
