= Kottoor Soman =

Indian kumki elephant and false longevity claimant

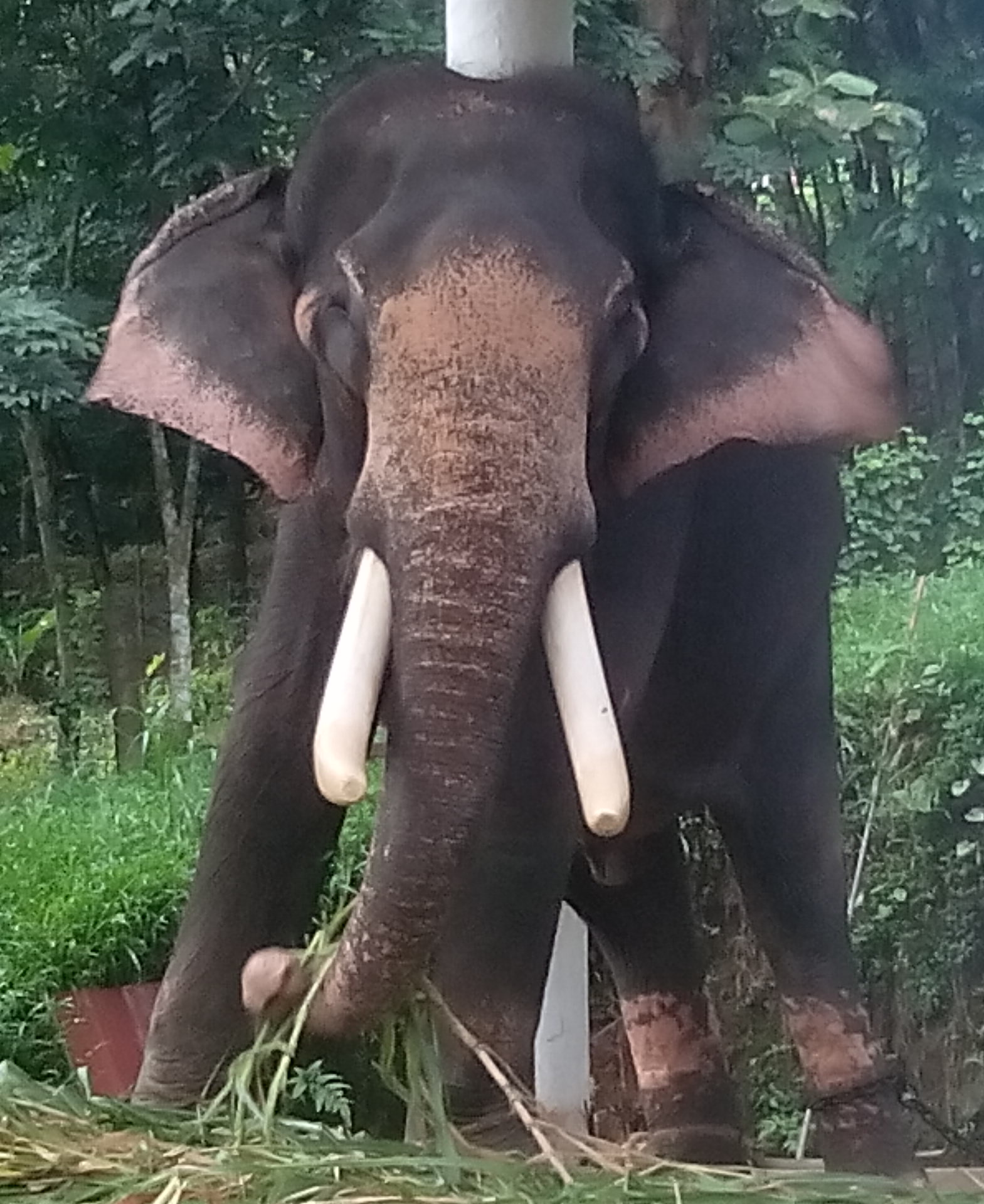
- Species: Elephas maximus (Asian Elephant)
- Sex: Male
- Born: c. 1942 (age 84); Konni, Kerala, India
- Nationality: Indian
- Owner: Kerala Forest Department

Kottoor Soman (c. 1942), also known as Konniyil Soman and Kottur Soman, is an Asian elephant, born in India. A retired kumki, he was represented in 2020 to be the oldest living elephant in the world, owned by the Kerala Forest Department, but the claim of birth year has not been confirmed, which is why his submission into Guinness Book of Records was rejected.

In fact, the longest-living elephant in the world was Vatsala, a female elephant who lived in the Panna Tiger Reserve in Madhya Pradesh, India. She died on Wednesday, 9 July 2025. She remains the only elephant known to have lived 100 years or longer.

== History ==
The forest department of Kerala procured Soman from Thekkuthodu Kepramala area of Ranni Forest Division in 1968, which is the earliest confirmed record. After taking him to Konni elephant camp, he was trained and served as a kumki. Many elephants were trained under Soman until 1977, after which the government banned the capture of forest elephants.

In October 2020, an event was organised at the Kottur Elephant Sanctuary and Rehabilation Centre, where Soman was honoured by the other elephants in the sanctuary, as the authority was preparing to enter him into Guinness World Record for the oldest elephant, after his purported 78th birthday.

== See also ==
- List of individual elephants
