= Kolakolli =

Indian rogue elephant

Kolakolli (Murder Murderer, Master Executioner) or Chakkamadan (Jack fruit Freak) was an Indian rogue elephant active in the Peppara Wildlife Sanctuary near Thiruvananthapuram. This elephant gained considerable notoriety among Indian media and was accused of killing 12 people in and around Peppara over a span of seven to eight years. As a result, a hunt was launched to capture the tusker in 2006. Kolakolli was eventually captured and died whilst in captivity.

== Origin of name ==
The elephant was initially nicknamed Chakkamadan (Chakka-Jack fruit) because of its fondness for ripping jack fruits and used to regularly visit farms during jack fruit seasons. It was also said to have a body odour similar to smell of jack fruits. The rogue elephant later gained its new nickname Kolakolli that originated out of the Malayalam words 'Kola' which means murder (also used as a superlative in a notorious sense) and 'Kolli', meaning murderer.

== Capture and death ==
A hunt was launched for the elephant in 2006 after it gained notoriety as a dangerous murderer. The plan was to capture and tame Kolakolli. After several weeks of intense efforts the elephant was captured and sent for training. However it died a few days later reportedly due to cardiac arrest, while in captivity.

== See also ==
- Black Diamond
- Rogue elephant of Aberdare Forest
- List of individual elephants
