= Kottur Elephant Sanctuary and Rehabilitation Centre =

World's largest elephant rehabilation centre

- Location within Kerala
- Location: Thiruvananthapuram Kerala, India
- Nearest city: Thiruvananthapuram
- Coordinates: 8°24′N 77°10′E
- Area: 176 ha (430 acres)
- Established: 2006 (currently in upgradation)
- Visitors: 3,50,000 per year (in future after completion)
- Governing body: Kerala Forest Department

Kottur Elephant Sanctuary and Rehabilitation Centre located near Kappukadu in Thiruvananthapuram district of Kerala is an elephant sanctuary and rehabilitation centre. Started in 2006 as an elephant sanctuary, the Kerala government announced a project in 2019 to expand it as an elephant rehabilitation centre with international standards. When completed, it will become the largest rehabilitation centre for the elephants in the world. It is also the first rehabilitation centre for elephants in India, constructed at an estimated cost of ₹105 crores. The centre is spread across 176 hectares of forest and currently have 16 elephants, with a capacity to accommodate 50 elephants in future after completion.

The first phase of the project was inaugurated in February 2021 by the Chief minister of Kerala, Pinarai Vijayan. After the full completion, it is expected that Kottur will become a major tourist destination in the district with more than 3.5 lakh people, including half a lakh tourists from overseas expected to visit it every year.

== History ==
In 2006, the forest department of Kerala decided to set up an elephant sanctuary in Kottur. The forest department's project was to construct is an elephant park. It was converted into an elephant rehabilitation center in 2007 in the high level water areas of Neyyar Wildlife Sanctuary. At that time, the forest department had the objectives like to rehabilitate both the tamed and forest elephants in suitable habitat, special protection of old and young elephants, to conduct research and to make it a suitable place for tourists.

== Facilities ==
The proposed centre will have facilities to accommodate 50 elephants including the existing 16 elephants. It can also accommodate 80 mahouts. Presently 441 reservoirs and other check dams have been constructed to provide easy access to water in the forest for wild animals. In 2020, as a part of upgradation of the centre into the world's largest elephant care centre, the government allocated 72 crores for the construction of new facilities. As a part of it, fifty habitats surrounded by steel pillars and steel nets that allow elephants to live in their natural habitat, an elephant museum, a veterinary hospital with super specialty facilities, a research center for nature lovers and students, training center for mahouts, facilities for visitors, entrance plaza, administrative office, cottages, spacious convention center, amphitheater, various reservoirs, training facilities for baby elephants, a kitchen for cooking elephant foods, a feeding area, a post mortem facility for cremation including tamed elephants, a paper making unit from elephant dung and quarters and dormitories for mahouts to stay with their families will be constructed. The construction of these facilities will be completed in various phases and the first phase was inaugurated in February 2021.

== Attractions ==
In 2021, there were 15 elephants at the centre, the oldest being Kottoor Soman, a former kumki born circa 1942. Baby elephant Raju was then around one year old.

A major attraction at Kottur is the elephant parade. It is held on every weekends in which all elephants take part. In the parade, all the elephants move in a line, with each of the elephants holding the tail of the other one in front of them with their trunk. Another attractions are the bamboo rafting and a 3-km trekking to Kizhakkumalappara. The deer rehabilitation centre and the crocodile park under the Neyyar wildlife sanctuary are situated near to the centre.
