= Meenankal =

Village in Thiruvananthapuram District, Kerala, India

Coordinates: 8.637°N 77.100°E

Meenankal is a village in Thiruvananthapuram district in the state of Kerala, India, and located around 5 kilometers away from the Peppara Wildlife Sanctuary. Meenankal has border with Uzhamalakkal, Vellanad, Anad, Kuttichal, Vithura, Tholickode panchayaths and Thiruneveli District of Tamil Nadu, India. It's located in the Nedumangad Taluk and Aruvikkara Legislative Assembly. It is situated around 35 km away from Thiruvananthapuram city.

== Education ==
Government Tribal High School Meenankal was established in 1957 and it is managed by the Department of Education. It is located in a rural area. The school is located in Nedumangad block of Thiruvananthapuram district. The school consists of Grades from 1 to 10. The school is co-educational and it has an attached pre-primary section with it.
