= Agastya Mala =

Mountain in Tamilnadu, Southern India

Agasthyarkoodam
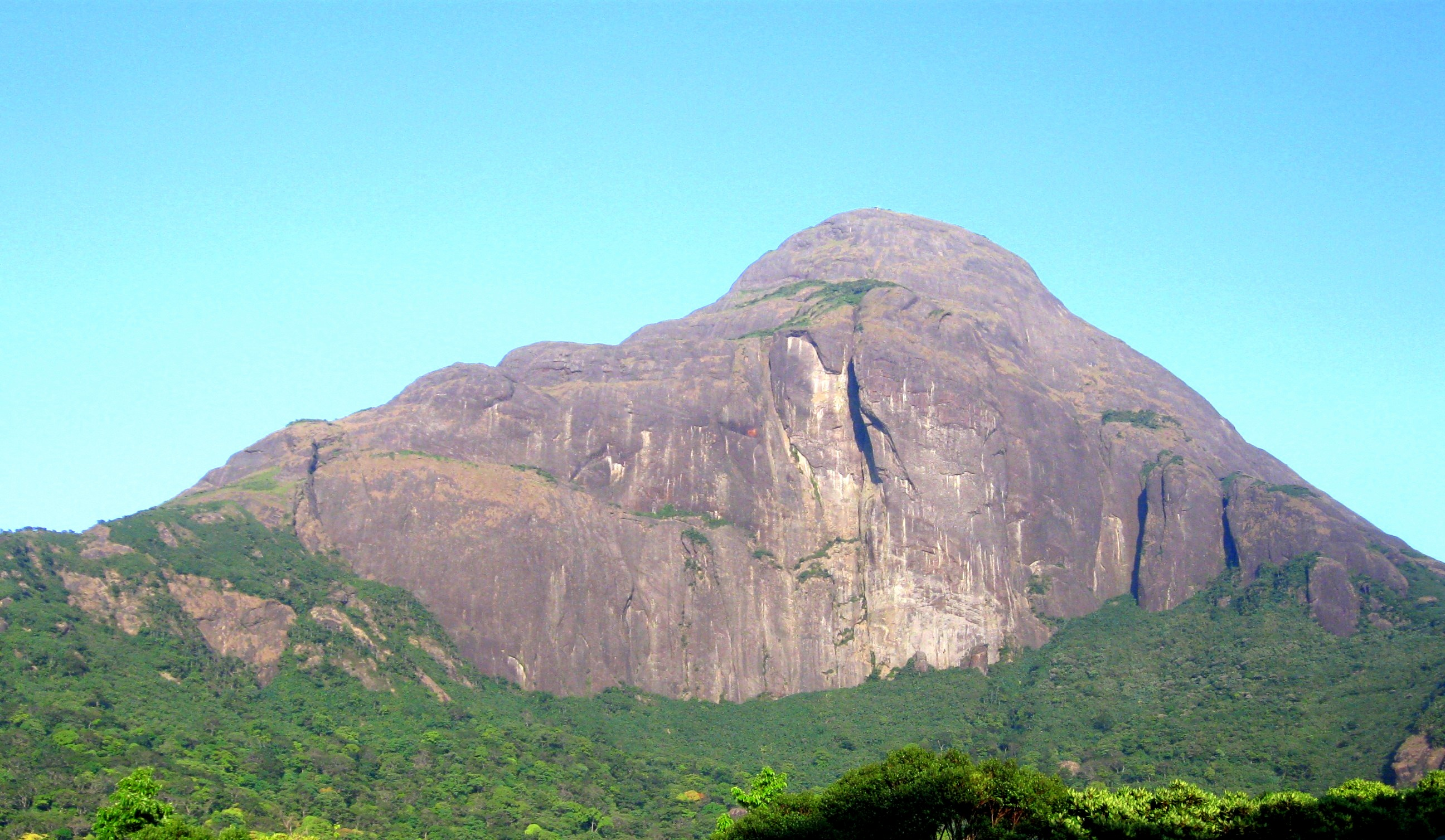
- A view of Agasthyarkoodam from Athirumala base camp

Highest point
- Elevation: 1,869 m (6,132 ft)
- Prominence: 1,510 m (4,950 ft)
- Listing: Ultra, Ribu
- Coordinates: 8°36′58.64″N 77°14′44.62″E

Geography
- Location within India
- Location: Tamil Nadu, India
- Parent range: Western Ghats

Agasthyamala (or Agasthyarkoodam) is one of the peaks of the Agasthyamala Biosphere Reserve in the Western Ghats that lies between the districts of Tirunelveli District of Tamil Nadu and Thiruvananthapuram District of Kerala, India. This peak is specifically located in the Thiruvananthapuram district of Kerala, near the Tamil Nadu border. It is 1,868-metres (6,129 ft) tall.. The perennial Thamirabarani River originates from the eastern side of the range and flows into the Tirunelveli district of Tamil Nadu. The rivers flowing westwards through the district of Thiruvananthapuram in Kerala are the Karamana River and the Neyyar river.

Agasthyarkoodam is a major trekking spot in the southern end of the Western Ghats. It is also considered as a pilgrimage spot for devotees of the Hindu sage Agastya, who is considered to be one of the seven rishis (Saptarishi) of Hindu Puranas. In Tamil traditions, Agastya is considered as the father of the Tamil language and the compiler of the first Tamil grammar called Agattiyam or Akattiyam. There is a small stone statue of sage Agastya at the top of the peak where one can offer flowers as offerings to the mystical sage considered as a “Chiranjeevi” which means immortal.

Agasthyamala Biosphere Reserve is among 20 new sites added by UNESCO to its World Network of Biosphere Reserves in March 2016. The International Co-ordinating Council added the new sites during a two-day meeting on 19 March 2016 in Lima, bringing the total number of biosphere reserves to 669 sites in 120 countries, including 16 transboundary sites. The biosphere reserve includes close to 300 rare bird species and more than 200 medicinal plants endemic to this region.

== Name ==
Named after the sage Agastya, the official Survey of India name for the mountain is Agastya Malai (Malayalam: അഗസ്ത്യമല, lit. Mount Agastya).

The mountain is also known as Agasthyarkoodam (Malayalam: അഗസ്ത്യാർകൂടം , lit. the abode of Agastya) and Agastya Malai (Tamil: அகத்தியமலை, lit. Agastya Hill).

== Geography ==
Agasthyamala is 32 km from Neyyar Dam and 22 km from Bonacaud, near Vithura & Ponmudi. The major city and airport nearest to Agasthyarkoodam is Thiruvananthapuram and its Thiruvananthapuram International Airport, around 61 km away. The nearest railway stations are Thiruvananthapuram, Kerala and Ambasamudram, Tirunelveli District, Tamil Nadu. The trekking path, nearly 22 km, is from Bonacaud.

Kalakkad Mundanthurai Tiger Reserve is part of the Agasthyarkoodam range. Part of the peak can be seen from the Upper Kodayar region.

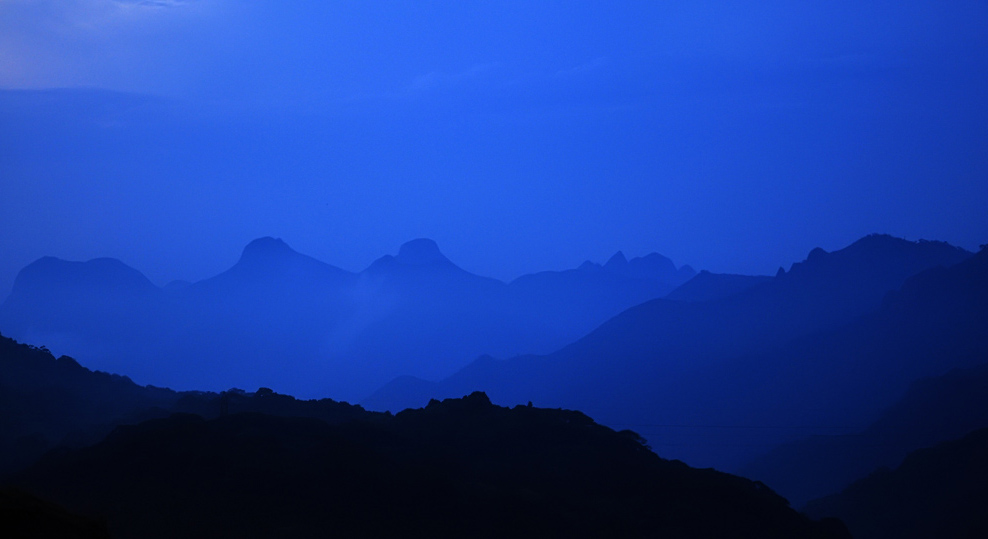
A view of the Agasthyamalai range from Upper Kodayar

Other major rivers which originate from the mountain are the Karamana River, which flows through the Thiruvananthapuram district and is the major source of drinking water to the city, and the Neyyar River (also in the Thiruvananthapuram district).

=== Trekking routes ===
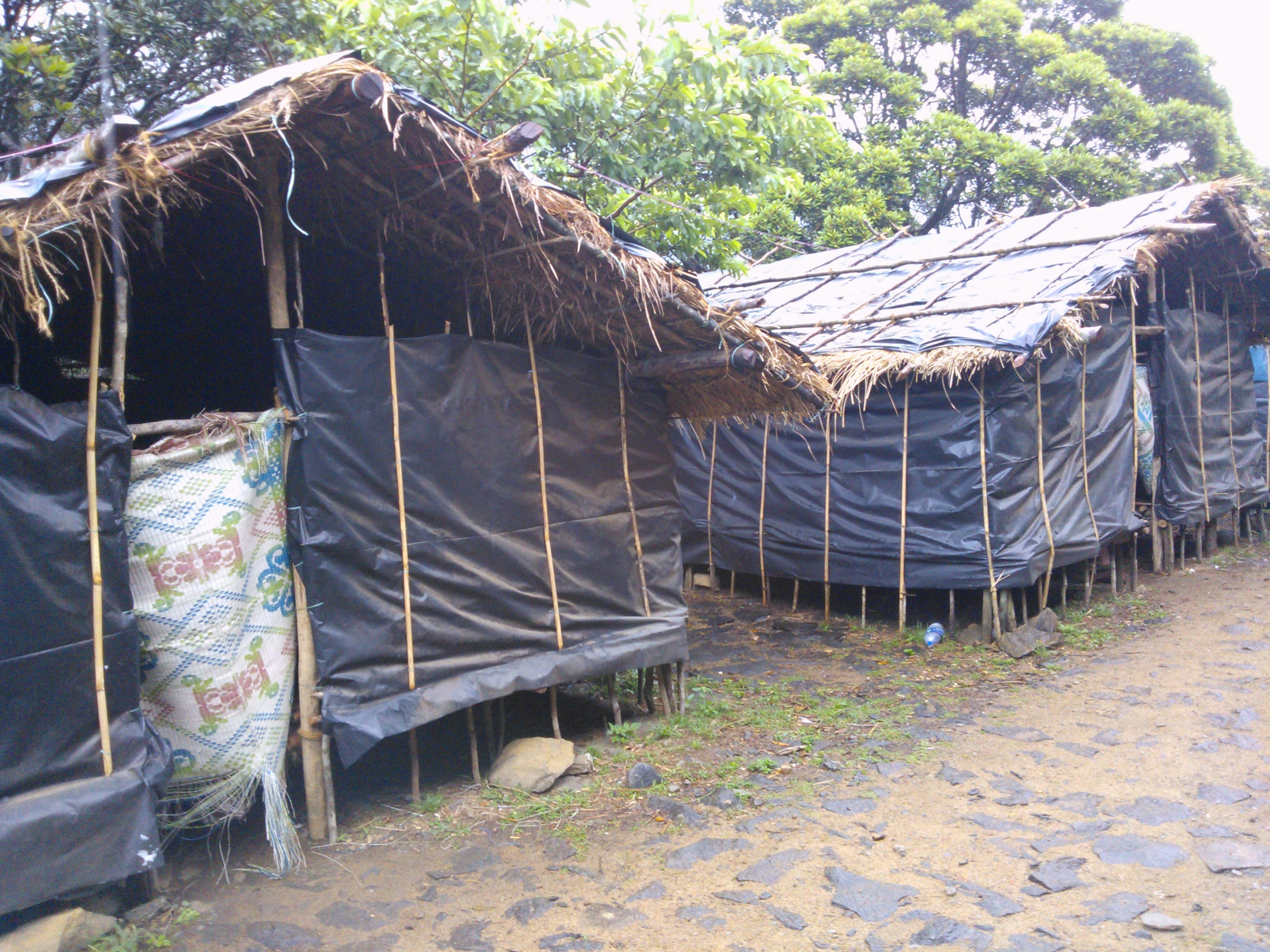
Athirumala Base Station in Agastya Mala

The peak of Agasthyarkoodam can be reached only by trekking up to it. Trekking is allowed based on strict guidelines and is open to pilgrims during January to mid-March. Trekking passes are issued by Kerala Forest Department from the district office at Trivandrum. The trekking route starts from Bonacaud. The route "Neyyar-Agasthyakoodam" is not open to the public.

Vehicles reach only till Bonacaud which is around 50 km from Thiruvananthapuram. The trek to the peak is 20 km long from Bonacaud and requires two days. The first part of the trek can be started from the Bonacaud Picket Station in the early morning and is 14 km through the forest to the Athirumala base camp. Elephants and wild bulls are in abundance in this part, especially in the evenings. The final stretch, an arduous 6KM trek, begins from the camp on the second day. The second leg of the journey from Athirumala base camp to the peak is more difficult and requires one to scale about 3600ft. The trail crosses the state border into Tamil Nadu and leads to the summit of Agasthyarkoodam.

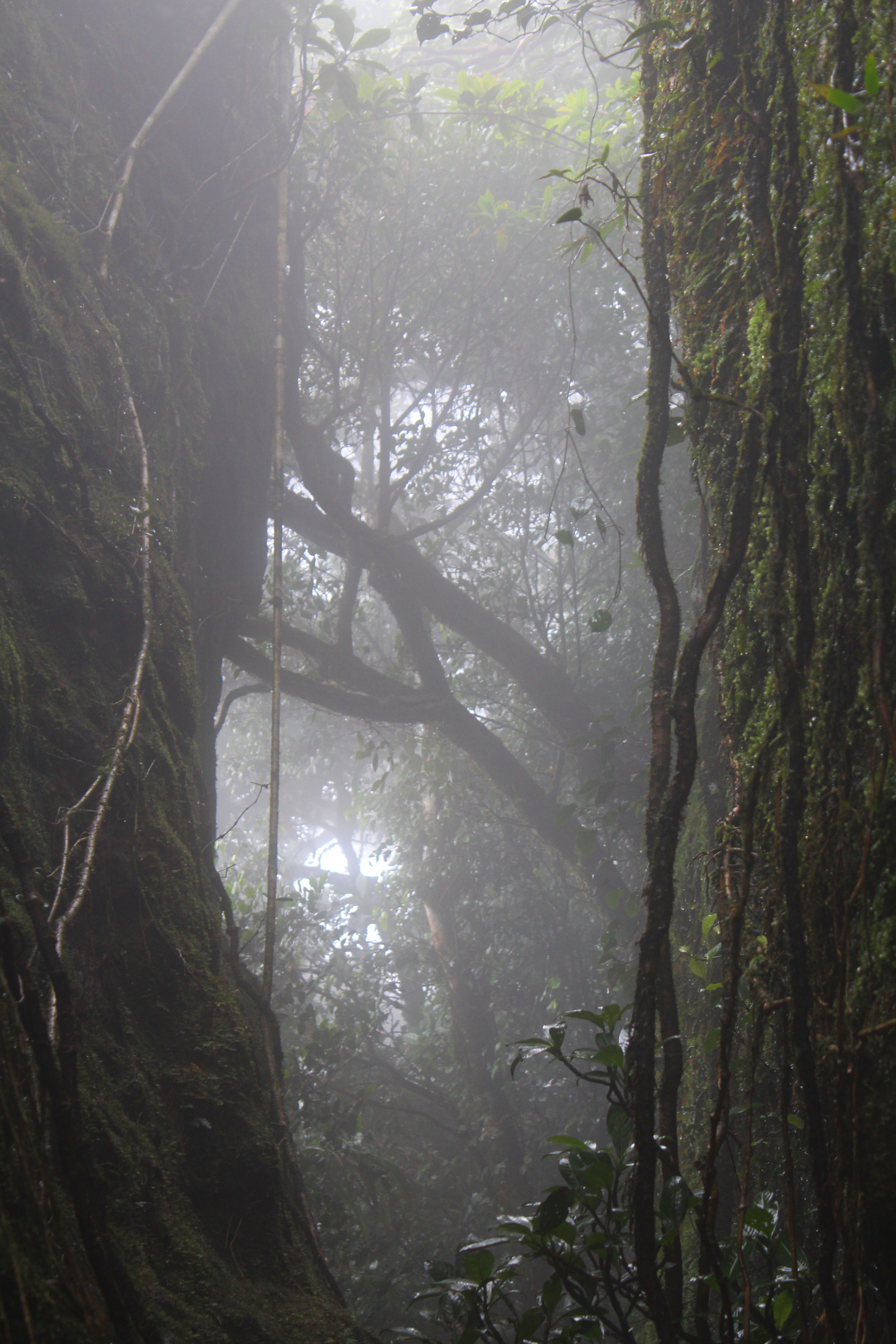
An old rock broken apart by nature in Agasthyamala before reaching Agasthya muni idol.

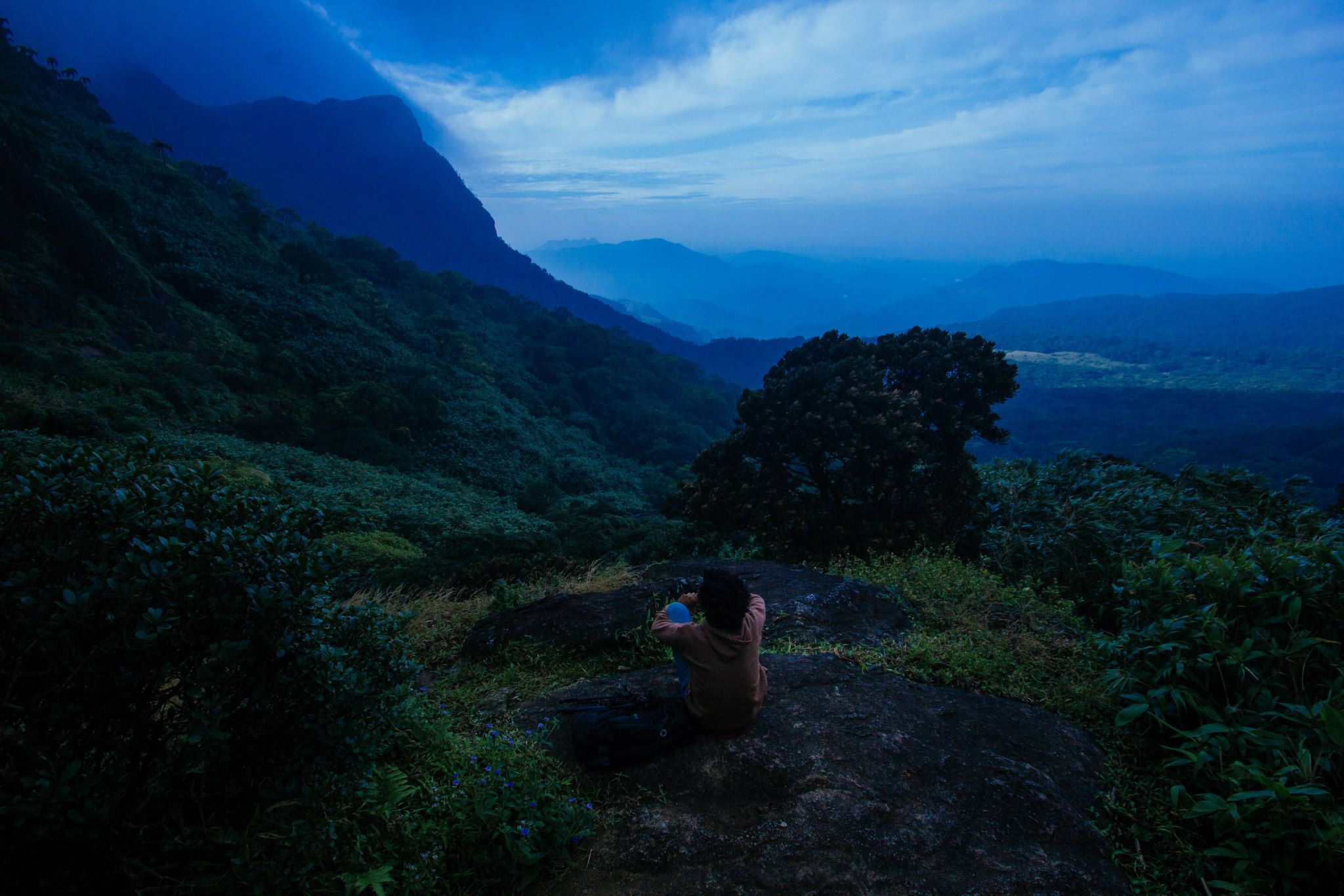
Agasthyakoodam Trek Route

== Vegetation ==
The lower elevations of this peak are known for their abundance of rare herbs and medicinal plants. Around 2,000 medicinal plants used in Ayurvedic treatments are found here. Europeans, particularly those from England, were the first to establish tea gardens around the base stations of the mountain at Brimore, Bonacaud, and Ponmudi.

The Agasthyamala Biosphere Reserve harbours rare flora and fauna. Tourists are permitted to the area only with permission from the forest department of Kerala. Annual trekking passes to the peak are issued from the forest department during January–February only.

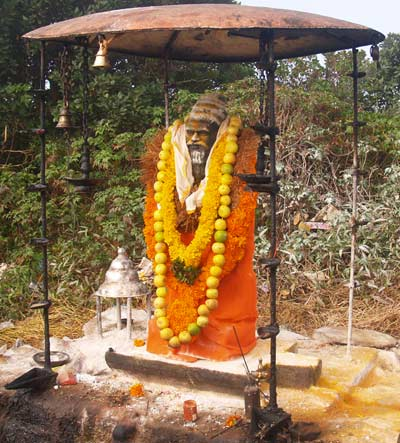
Murti of Agasthya Muni at the top of Agasthyamalai hill

== Manjolai Hills ==
Between elevations ranging from 1000 to 1500 metres, the Manjolai area is set deep within the Western Ghats within the Kalakkad Mundanthurai Tiger Reserve in the Tirunelveli District. Located on top of the Manimuthar Dam and the Manimuthar Water Falls, the Manjolai area has tea plantations, small settlements around the tea plantations, Upper Kodaiyar Dam, and a windy view point called Kuthiravetti.

The tea plantations and the whole of Manjolai Estates are operated by the Bombay Burmah Trading Corporation Ltd on forest lands leased by the singampatti zamin. There are three tea estates in the Manjolai area — Manjolai Estate, Manimutharu Estate, and Oothu Estate. The estates are on elevations ranging between 2,300 and 4,200 feet (701 and 1,280 m). The estates, road, and the settlements in the Manjolai area are managed by the Bombay Burmah Trading Corporation Ltd.

== Former status prohibiting women ==
Prior to November 2018, women were forbidden to climb Agasthyarkoodam by the local Kani tribe. After a court ruling which removed the prohibition, a woman, Dhanya Sanal — an Indian Information Service officer — reached the peak in 2019, becoming the first woman known to make the climb. Since the change in the law, more than 100 other women have registered for a license to make the climb.

== See also ==
- Agasthyamala Biosphere Reserve
- Indian Council of Forestry Research and Education
- Thamirabarani River
- Tirunelveli
- Papanasam
- Anamudi - Highest peak in Western Ghats
- Tourism in Thiruvananthapuram
