= Valiyavilapuram =

- suburb
- Location in Kerala, India Valiyavilapuram (India)
- Coordinates: 8°28′35.5″N 77°8′25.3″E
- Country: India
- State: Kerala
- District: Thiruvananthapuram

Languages
  - Official: Malayalam, English
- Time zone: UTC+5:30 (IST)
- PIN: 695125
- Telephone code: 2255, 2256
- Vehicle registration: KL-74

Valiyavilapuram is a suburb in the Perumkadavilla Block Panchayat, Aryancode panchayat of Thiruvananthapuram district in Kerala, South India. This place is around 1 km from Ottasekharamangalam, around 9 km from Vellarada, around 8 km from Kattakada and around 15 km from Neyyattinkara.

Valiyavilapuram is the place where the Thudali-Vellarada road meets the Ottasekharamangalam-Vellarada road. Shri C K Hareendran of CPI(M) is the sitting MLA of this place.[1]
