= Neyyar Wildlife Sanctuary =

Indian wildlife sanctuary

Neyyar Wildlife Sanctuary നെയ്യാർ വന്യജീവി സംരക്ഷ്ണ കേന്ദ്രം
- IUCN category IV (habitat/species management area)
- Location within Kerala Location within India
- Interactive map of Neyyar Wildlife Sanctuary നെയ്യാർ വന്യജീവി സംരക്ഷ്ണ കേന്ദ്രം
- Location: Thiruvananthapuram District, Kerala, India
- Nearest city: Thiruvananthapuram
- Coordinates: 8°24′N 77°10′E
- Area: 128 square kilometres (49 sq mi)
- Established: 1958

The Neyyar Wildlife Sanctuary in the southern state of Kerala in India is spread over the southeast corner of the Western Ghats, and covers a total area of 128 km^{2} (49 sq mi). It is located between 77° 8’ to 77° 17’ east longitude and 8° 29’ to 8° 37’ north latitude, central location 8°33′N 77°12.5′E. Although it was declared as a sanctuary in 1958, not much was done about wildlife conservation, until 1985, when a separate wildlife wing was set up and as a result, conservation efforts have gathered momentum. It is part of the Agasthyamala Biosphere Reserve.

== Geography ==
This is the drainage basin for the Neyyar River and its tributaries - Mullayar and Kallar. The towering peak of Agasthyamalai at an elevation of 1868 meters is a very prominent landmark.

== Climate ==
The mean summer temperature is around 35 degrees Celsius and the winter being around 16 degree Celsius. The average rainfall from the Southwest monsoon between May and July and the Northeast monsoon between October and November, is about 2800 mm. The tourist season here is between the months of November and March.

== Flora and fauna ==
This sanctuary has a substantial natural vegetation cover. The diversity of its flora makes the sanctuary an ideal gene pool preserve. There are 39 species of mammals, including tiger, leopard, sloth bear, elephant, sambar, barking deer, bonnet macaque, Nilgiri langur and Nilgiri tahr. 176 species of birds, 30 species of reptiles, 17 species of amphibians and 40 species of fishes are reported from the sanctuary.

A crocodile farm, set up in 1977 at Neyyar, is home to around 20 mugger crocodiles. The Crocodile Rehabilitation and Research Centre was inaugurated at Neyyar Wildlife Sanctuary in May 2007.

== See also ==
- Neyyar Dam
- Crocodile Rehabilitation and Research Centre
- Tourism in Thiruvananthapuram
- Kottur Elephant Sanctuary and Rehabilitation Centre
