= Neyyar Safari Park =

Safari park in Thiruvananthapuram, India

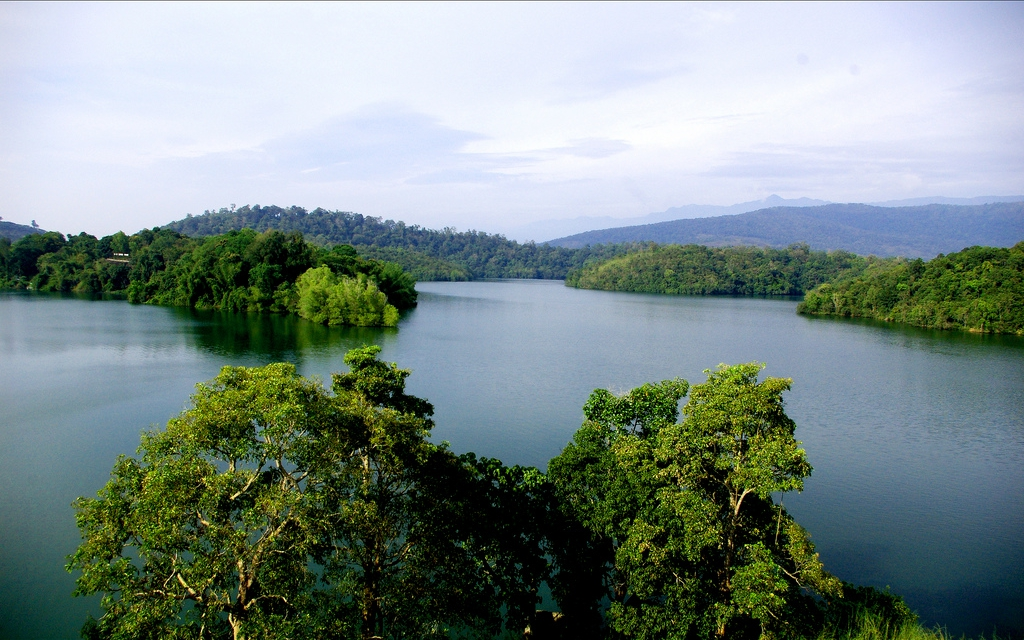
- Park view from Neyyar Dam
- Type: Safari Park
- Location: Thiruvananthapuram, India
- Area: 40468.564 m2
- Created: 1985
- Status: Open all year

Neyyar Safari Park is a safari park near Neyyar Dam in Thiruvananthapuram, India, extending over an area of 40,468.564 square metres.
