= Peppara Dam =

Masonry gravity dam on the Karamana River in Trivandrum, Kerala, India

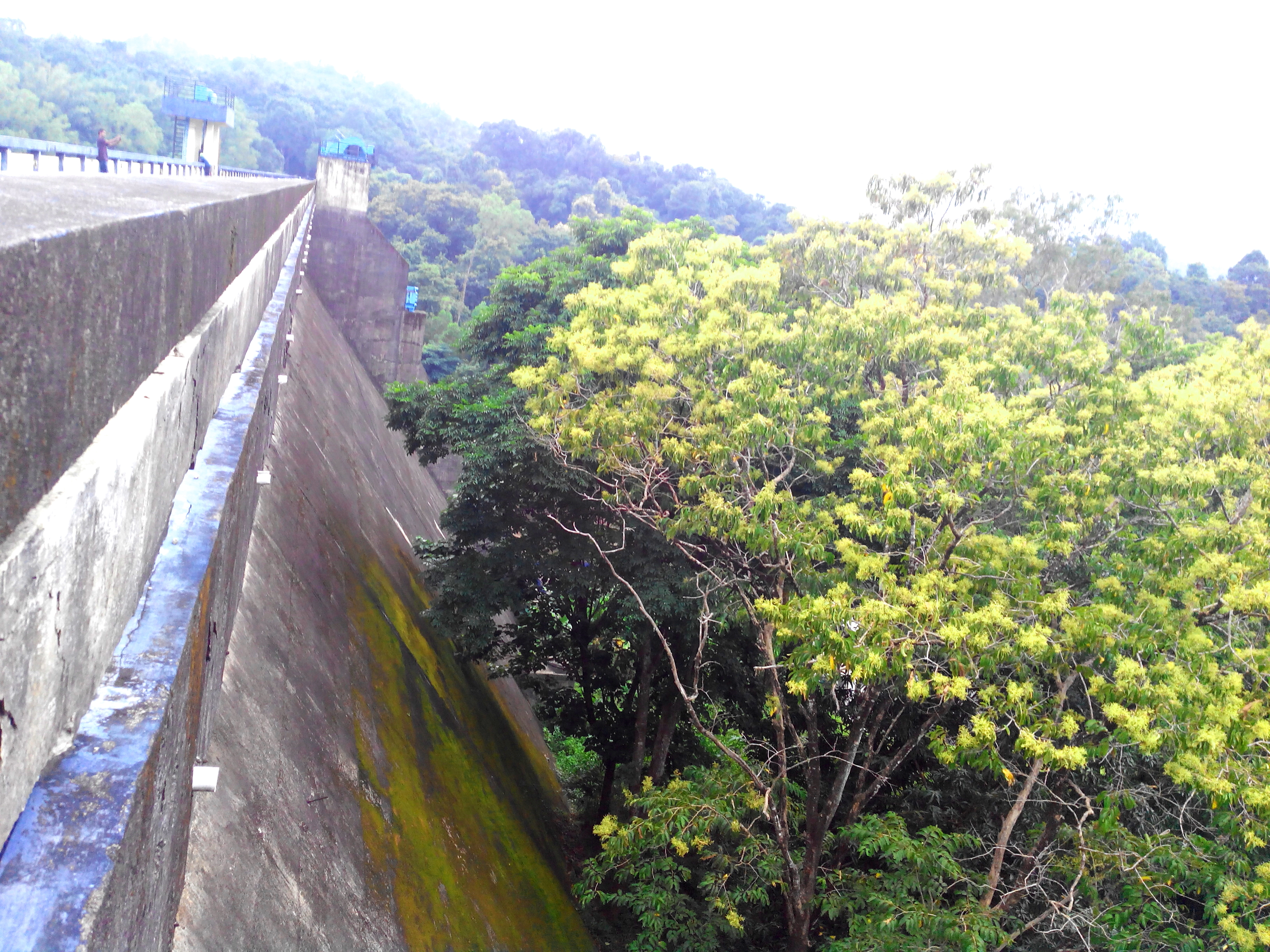
- Peppara Dam

- Location within India Location within Kerala Location within Tamil Nadu
- Coordinates: 8.623°N 77.138°E
- Opening date: 1983; 43 years ago

Peppara Dam is a masonry gravity dam on the Karamana River in Thiruvananthapuram District. It is built by the Kerala Water Authority in 1983 has a catchment area of 83 km^{2} and receives an average rain fall of 481 cm. The 423m long dam unifies all upper tributaries of the Karamana river and water flow to Aruvikkara is regulated to suit the needs of the Trivandrum city. There is also a 3MW hydel power station at Peppara. It is the main drinking water supply to Thiruvananthapuram city and suburban areas. This dam is situated inside the Peppara Wildlife Sanctuary.
