= Bonacaud =

Bonacaud Bonakkad
- Place
- Location in Kerala, India Bonacaud (India)
- Coordinates: 8°45′25″N 77°11′20″E
- Country: India
- State: Kerala
- District: Thiruvananthapuram
- Talukas: Nedumangad

Government
  - Body: Gram panchayat

Languages
  - Official: Malayalam, English
- Time zone: UTC+5:30 (IST)
- PIN: 695551
- Telephone code: 0472
- Nearest city: Thiruvananthapuram

Bonacaud (Kerala state, India) is the base station of the famous peak, Agasthyarkoodam in the Agasthya hills. The Agasthya hill range is famous for its abundance of rare herbs and medicinal plants.

There is a tea estate in Bonacaud, established by the British. The hill resort Ponmudi is near Bonacaud. Bonacaud (natively called Bonakkad) is now used as trekking base camp to Agasthyakoodam. It has many scenic locations including the forests, waterfalls and tea estates.

It is located at 8°45′25″N 77°11′20″E

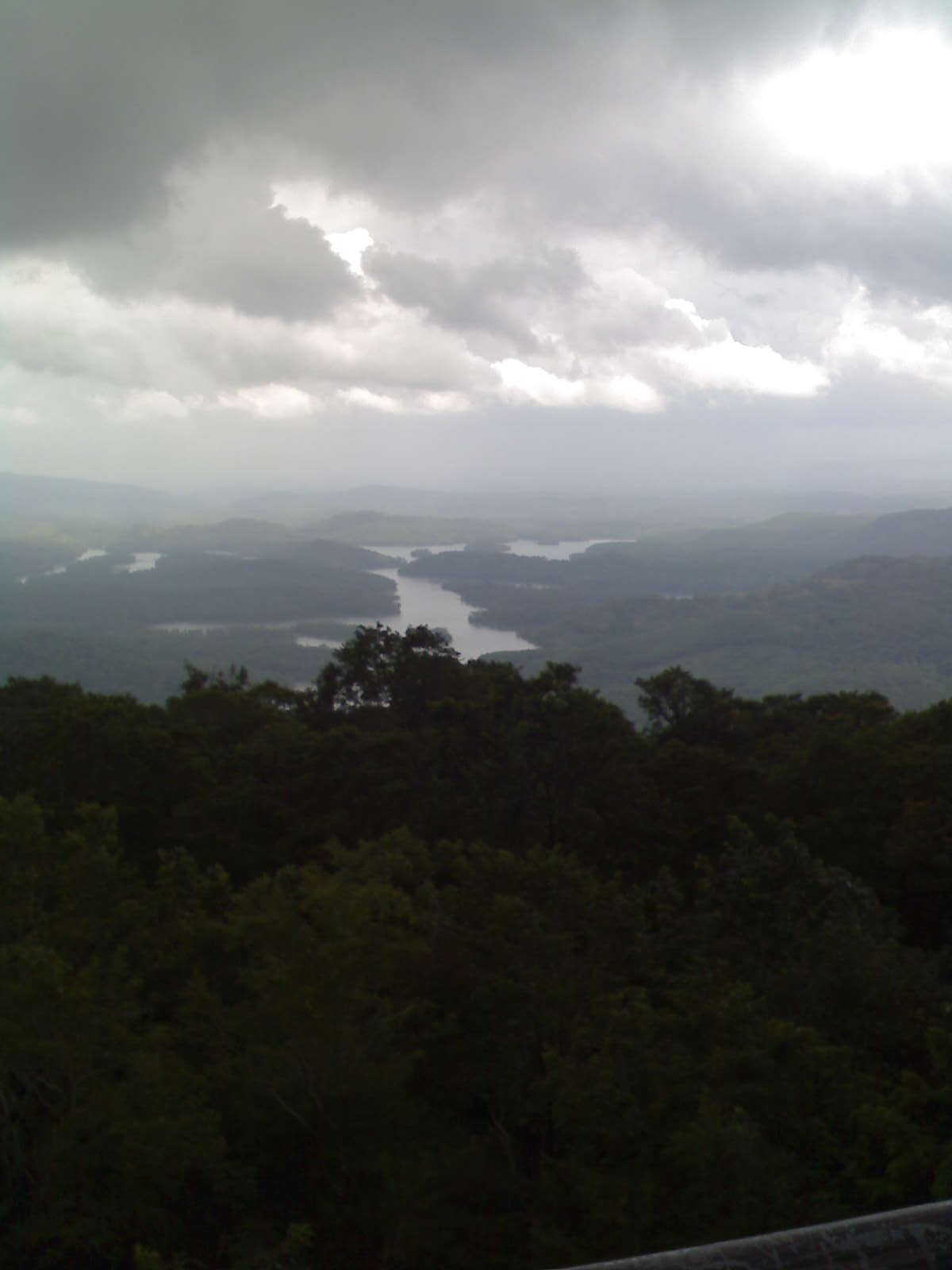
View From Bonacaud Hill showing peppara reservoir

The place has the famous Bona Falls, an enthralling place with a lot of fauna. Vazuvanchola near Bona falls is also famous for its waterfalls.

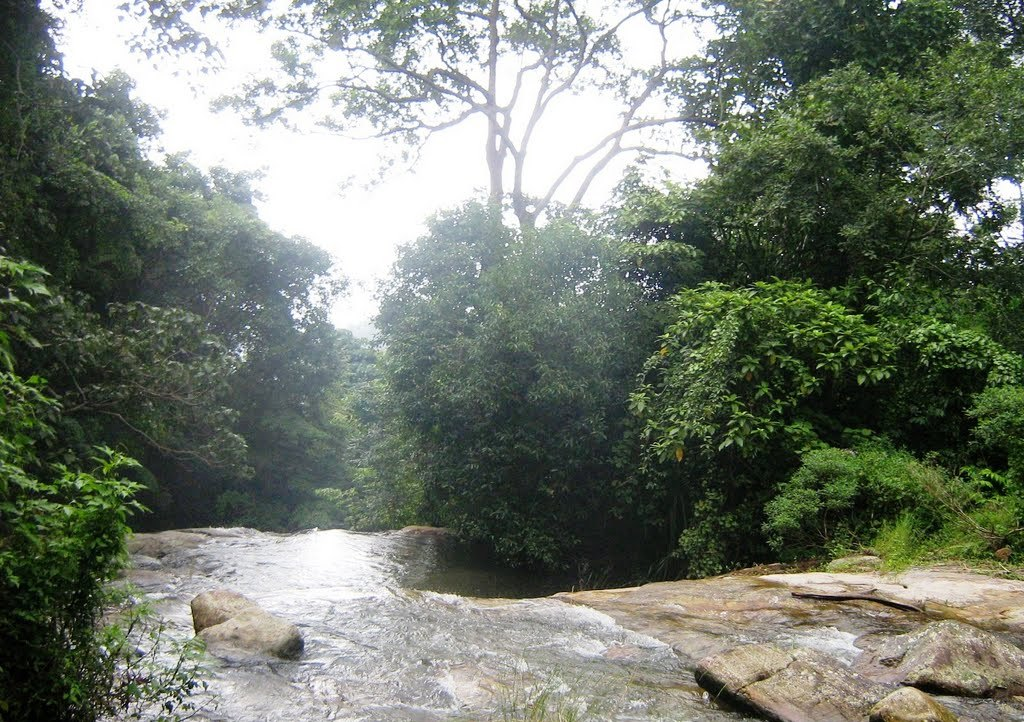
A stream inside the Bonacaud estate

The estate has cardamom, coconut, pepper and tea.

The exact name of the place is Bonaccord (from French "bon accord", i.e. good agreement) named by the British. It is believed that around 1850 an estate was established on the top of the hill and near to a river named as Sooryakanthi. Due to lack of sun light, many labors fell in ill and died. Later the management has changed the location and came down and established the estate in the present location. The laborers had been brought from southern Tamil Nadu and their descendants still live in the estate.

Till 1995, the estate was owned by Mahavir Plantations Limited. Lower-priced tea imports following the implementation of General Agreement on Tariffs and Trade pushed the estate into losses. The estate was taken over by a bank and the plantation was shut down after the owner failed to repay the loan on the estate. The families were provided with free ration by the State Government. In 2014, the State Government Labour department convinced the estate management to reopen the estate, but the employees were neither paid salary nor the free ration after that. Currently the State Government is in the process of taking over the estate.

== How to reach ==
- Nearest city : Thiruvananthapuram (Trivandrum) 61 km.
- Nearest airport : Trivandrum International airport 67 km.
- Nearest railway station : Trivandrum Central 62 km.
