= Kerala snakebite murder =

Snakebite murder case in Kerala

Kerala snakebite murder case
- Venue: Kollam, Kerala
- Location: Anchal, Kollam, Kerala, India
- Also known as: Uthra murder case
- Type: Murder case
- Deaths: 1
- Inquiries: Kerala Police
- Arrests: 5 (as of 22 August 2020)
- Suspects: Sooraj S. Kumar
- Charges: Murder

Kerala snakebite culpable homicide was a case in which the victim, Uthra, a twenty-five-year-old woman, was killed by a snakebite inflicted while she was asleep on 7 May 2020. She was in her parents' home in Anchal, located in the South Indian state of Kerala.

Her husband, Sooraj S. Kumar, a twenty-seven-year-old bank employee, was arrested. Later, he confessed to the public media that he purchased a cobra, and introduced the snake into their bedroom, with the intention of killing his wife. Kerala Police produced strong scientific evidence that supported a charge of murder. In Kollam sessions court, on 13 October 2021, Sooraj S. Kumar was found guilty of killing his wife by forcing a live cobra to bite her. Judge M. Manoj sentenced him to 17 years imprisonment plus double life imprisonment and a monetary penalty of 5 lakh (500,000) rupees.

== Incident ==
Uthra was a disabled young housewife who had been married for two years, and was the mother of a one-year-old son. At the time, Uthra was recovering from a previous Russell's viper bite, inflicted on 2 March 2020, two months prior at her husband's home near Adoor, and she was living in her parents' home during her recovery. The viper bite caused her to be completely bed-ridden for around 52 days, and she had to undergo plastic surgery to repair the damage.

She was found unconscious in her bedroom in her parents' home when her mother called on her in the morning. It appeared that she had been bitten by a snake during the night of 6 May 2020. Uthra died the next day, 7 May 2020. A large Indian cobra was found in the bedroom that she shared with her husband.

According to Uthra's mother, Manimegalai, her daughter and Sooraj went to bed after dinner. The next morning Sooraj, usually a late riser, woke up unusually early and went outside. However, Uthra didn't wake up at her usual time. Her mother went into her room and found Uthra unconscious. Later, the room was searched, and the cobra was discovered and killed.

== Complaint and evidence ==
One week after his daughter's death, Uthra's father, Vijayasenan, contacted police, stating that he suspected foul play in his daughter's death. He filed a complaint on 21 May to Kerala Police, calling it an unnatural death. Her parents stated that, because Uthra and her husband were sleeping in an air-conditioned room, it would have been difficult for the cobra to enter the room without being detected.

Uthra had already informed her parents about Sooraj Kumar's expertise in handling venomous snakes. Approximately two months prior to her death from the cobra bite, Uthra had been bitten by a Russell's viper. The combination of the two incidents caused police to suspect Sooraj Kumar's involvement in this case.

Noted snake expert Vava Suresh took interest in the incident. After visiting both homes, he recommended that Uthra's family contact the police. Later, Vava Suresh gave his expert testimony and statement to the police. In the first snakebite incident, he said that a Russell's viper would have been unable to reach the second storey room in her husband's home, where Uthra received the first snake bite. In regards to the second, fatal bite, Vava Suresh also noted that it would have been difficult for the cobra to enter the air-conditioned room in Uthra's parents' home unaided. He surmised that the cobra may have been "hurt", as a means of forcing it to bite the sleeping woman.

== Discovery and arrests ==
The police arrested the victim's husband, Sooraj, as the prime suspect and arrested the snake catcher Chavarukavu Suresh Kumar as a second suspect in the case. On 12 July 2020, Sooraj made a public confession about the murder. He stated that he bought two snakes for ₹10,000 each (US$135), from Kumar.

According to the police, Sooraj admitted that he gave "sleep-inducing pills" to his wife in order to sedate her before releasing the snake. He confessed that he had starved the cobra for eleven days to ensure that the cobra would bite his wife. The snake "was kept in a bottle without being fed" from 24 April to 6 May.

The investigating team reported that Uthra was attacked twice, first with a viper and then with a cobra. The Kerala police's special investigation team (SIT) stated that Sooraj would be the primary person accused and that another case would be registered against him, his mother, father and sister for domestic violence and destroying evidence. The State Women's Commission also urged the police to arrest the family members.

Crime Branch Deputy Superintendent of Police, A Ashokan, the officer who had led the investigation stated that prior to her death, "she wasn’t able to walk, was in a bed-ridden situation for 52 days and had to undergo a plastic surgery after getting bitten by the viper. Making her get bitten again with a more venomous snake while she had still not recovered from the earlier attempt amounts to brutal murder only”.

Sooraj was booked under various sections of the Indian Penal Code for murder, attempted murder, attempted permanent injury and destruction of evidence.

During the course of the investigation, it was discovered that gold from Uthra's bank locker had been removed on 2 March, the date of her first snakebite. In early June 2020, Uthra's father-in-law, Surendran Panicker (59) was arrested, on charges of destroying evidence and hiding 38 sovereign of gold jewellery, which police discovered buried in a nearby rubber plantation. Uthra's parents stated that the majority of her dowry was still missing.

In August 2020, both Renuka and Surya, mother and sister of Sooraj, were arrested on charges of conspiracy, domestic violence and destruction of evidence. The charges include "sections 498A (Husband or relative of husband of a woman subjecting her to cruelty), 406 (Punishment for criminal breach of trust), 201 (Causing disappearance of evidence of offence, or giving false information to screen offender) and 34 (Acts done by several persons in furtherance of common intention)".

Although Chavarukavu Suresh Kumar was originally one of the accused, he became a witness in the case.

== Forensic evidence ==
On 26 May 2020, Kerala Police sent the carcass of the cobra for forensic examination. The cobra was 80 cm long, and capable of inflicting a fatal bite to a human. The then Kerala DGP Loknath Behra said that in this peculiar case, the investigation would be carried out in a scientific manner by conducting a DNA test on the dead snake.

== Motive ==
Sooraj S. Kumar, a private bank employee, is said to have planned the murder by watching snake handling videos on the internet and receiving training to handle venomous snakes. His motive was to take ownership of his wife's dowry in gold, as well as her life insurance policy. Police received information that Sooraj had obtained a life insurance policy on his wife a few months prior to her death.

Uthra's father said that "he had gifted over 100 sovereigns of gold and a new car" to Sooraj and his family, in addition to ₹10 lakhs in cash.

== Court case ==
The case became a major reference point in the criminology syllabus, since Sooraj employed a natural weapon to commit the murder. Lack of a history of such a crime made it difficult for the investigation team to determine that murder was committed. In December 2020, the snake catcher, Chavarukavu Suresh Kumar, testified to the court that Sooraj contacted him and purchased a snake. Suresh learned of Uthra's death from the newspapers. Sooraj told Suresh that he no longer wished to be wed to a disabled wife and that people would attribute his wife's death to "sarpa dosha", the wrath of snakes (a popular belief). Suresh said he was distressed by Uthra's death. According to his testimony, snakes he captured were usually released into the forest with assistance from Indian Forest officials.

=== Sessions Court judgement ===
In court, Sooraj was found guilty of using a live cobra to kill his wife Uthra. On 13 October 2021, Kollam Additional District and Sessions Court, led by additional sessions judge Manoj M, sentenced Sooraj to 17 years' imprisonment plus two consecutive life sentences, and an additional penalty of five lakh rupees. This is considered to be the first case in the state of Kerala in which a murder involved the use of a live animal as the weapon.

== In popular culture ==
A Malayalam film titled Rajakumari, inspired by the Uthra murder case, was announced in November 2025. The title poster was released by actress Manju Warrier.

The film is produced by Nalla Cinema Productions and marks the directorial debut of Unnidas Koodathil. The lead actress of the film is Athmiya Rajan, who portrays Janaki, a character based on Uthra.

The supporting cast includes Fahad Siddiq, Sreejith Ravi, Senthil Krishna, Veena Nair, Rithu Manthra, Kudassanad Kanakam, and Rajesh Kannur. Music is composed by Denson Dominic with lyrics by Vinayak Sasikumar.

== See also ==
- Dowry death
- Dowry system in India
- Rattlesnake James
