= Ottasekharamangalam =

- village
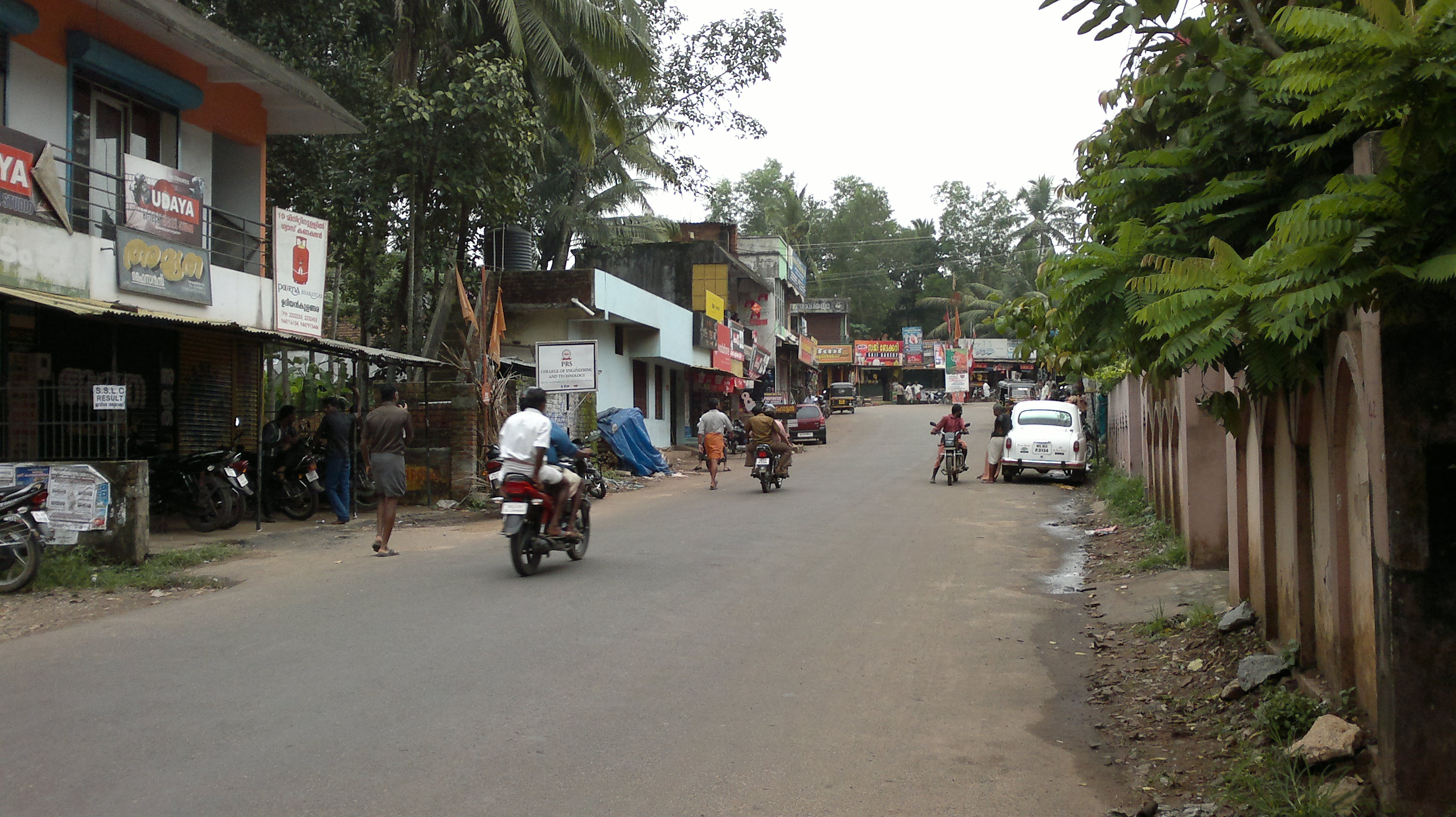

- Location in Kerala, India Ottasekharamangalam (India)
- Coordinates: 8°28′40″N 77°8′5″E
- Country: India
- State: Kerala
- District: Thiruvananthapuram

Government
  - Body: Gram panchayat

Population (2011)
  - Total: 19,345

Languages
  - Official: Malayalam, English
- Time zone: UTC+5:30 (IST)
- PIN: 695125
- Telephone code: 2255, 2256
- Vehicle registration: old KL-19 now KL 74

Ottasekharamangalam is a village in Thiruvananthapuram district in the state of Kerala, India.

== Demographics ==
As of 2011 India census, Ottasekharamangalam had a population of 19,345 with 9,322 males and 10,023 females.

== Religion ==
Hinduism, Christianity, and Islam co-exist harmoniously. The village is a temple village in India. Ottasekharamangalan means lord Siva.

Another 40 temples lie on the bank of the famous "Neyyar" river. Lord Siva temple hosts an important annual festival, Thiruvthira. The temple is flanked by chittaar. Followers of the Latin Catholic Church, Church of South India (SKD), St. Thomas Evangelical Church of India, ECI and Pentecostal Churches, form major Christian sects.

There is a famous Lord Siva temple in Ottasekharamangalam. Many devotees attend in the annual Thiruvathira festival and Thirunal sadya. The temple is flanked by the river Chittaar.

== See also ==
- Valiyavilapuram
