= Vilavoorkkal =

Vilavoorkal
- village
- Interactive map of Vilavoorkal
- Country: India
- State: Kerala
- District: Thiruvananthapuram

Government
  - Body: Gram panchayat

Population (2011)
  - Total: 31,761

Languages
  - Official: Malayalam,
- Time zone: UTC+5:30 (IST)
- PIN: 695571
- Vehicle registration: KL-74

Vilavoorkkal is a Census Town city in district of Thiruvananthapuram, Kerala. The Vilavoorkkal Census Town has population of 31,761 of which 15,647 are males while 16,114 are females as per report released by Census India 2011. Vilavoorkkal used to be a village in Thiruvananthapuram district in the state of Kerala, India but was upgraded to census town after reclassification.

== Demographics ==
The population of children aged between 0-6 in Vilavoorkkal is 2674, which is 8.42 % of total population. In the Vilavoorkkal Town Census, the female sex ratio is 1030 against state average of 1084. Moreover the child sex ratio in Vilavoorkkal is around 958 compared to Kerala state average of 964. The literacy rate of Vilavoorkkal city is 93.50 % lower than state average of 94.00 %. In Vilavoorkkal, male literacy is around 95.19 % while the female literacy rate is 91.86 %.
