= Keezharoor =

- village
- Location in Kerala, India Keezharoor (India)
- Coordinates: 8.4628°N 77.1395°E
- Country: India
- State: Kerala
- District: Thiruvananthapuram
- Talukas: Kattakada

Government
  - Body: Gram panchayat

Population (2011)
  - Total: 23,998

Languages
  - Official: Malayalam, English
- Time zone: UTC+5:30 (IST)
- PIN: 695130
- Vehicle registration: KL-
- Website: www.keezhariyourvarthakal.com

Keezharoor is a village in Thiruvananthapuram district in the state of Kerala, India.

== Demographics ==
As of 2011 India census, Keezharoor had a population of 23998 with 11737 males and 12261 females.
