= Peppara Wildlife Sanctuary =

Catchments of the Peppara Dam on the Karamana River in India

- IUCN category IV (habitat/species management area)
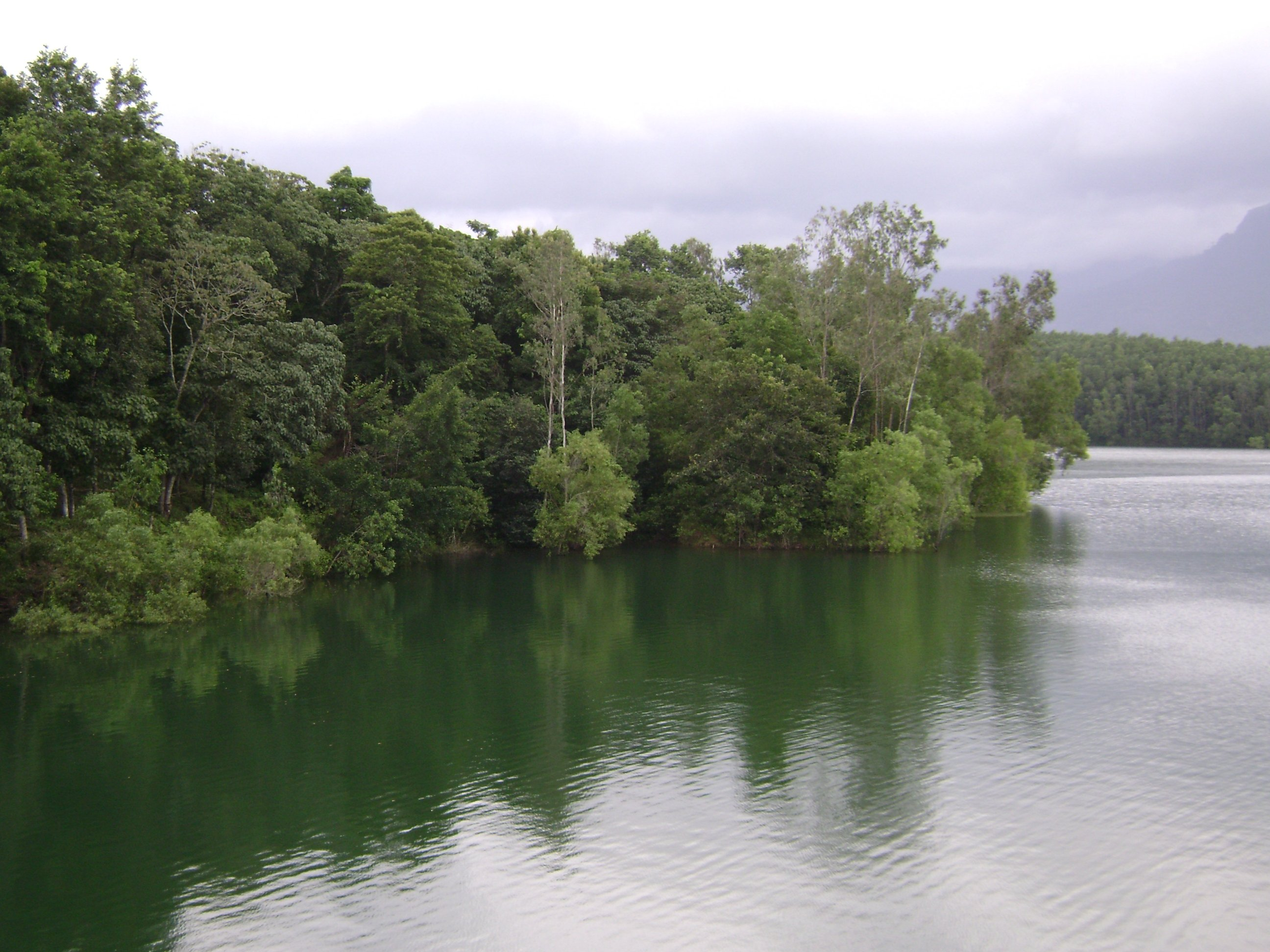
- Sanctuary as seen from the Peppara dam

- Location within Kerala Location within India
- Interactive map of Peppara Wildlife Sanctuary
- Location: Thiruvananthapuram district, Kerala, India
- Nearest city: Thiruvananthapuram 44 kilometers (27 mi)
- Coordinates: 8°38′50″N 77°10′0″E
- Established: 1983
- Governing body: Ministry of Environment and Forests, Kerala Forest Department
- Website: www.forest.kerala.gov.in

The Peppara Wildlife Sanctuary is a wildlife sanctuary in Thiruvananthapuram district of Kerala, India. It consists of the catchment area of the Karamana River, which originates from Chemmunjimottai, the tallest hill within the sanctuary. The sanctuary is named after the Peppara Dam, commissioned in 1983 to augment the drinking water supply to Thiruvananthapuram city and suburban areas. Considering the ecological significance of the area, it was declared a sanctuary in 1983. The terrain is undulating with elevation ranging from 100 metres (330 ft) to 1,717 metres (5,633 ft). The area of the sanctuary is 75 square kilometres (29 mi^{2}) with tropical moist evergreen forests and myristica swamps. It is part of the Agasthyamala Biosphere Reserve. Peppara Wildlife Sanctuary is 44 kilometres (27 mi) by car from the nearest railway station, at Thiruvananthapuram, and 49 kilometres (30 mi) from the Thiruvananthapuram airport.

== History ==
The area was formerly a part of the Paruthippally range of the Thiruvananthapuram territorial division. Forests consist of part of the Palode reserve (24 square kilometres (9.3 sq mi)) and part of Kottoor reserve (29 square kilometres (11 sq mi)). The total water spread of the reservoir is 5.82 square kilometres (2.25 sq mi).

== Geography ==
The Peppara Wildlife Sanctuary is situated on Thiruvananthapuram-Ponmudi Road, about 50 km northeast of Thiruvananthapuram.

The area is hilly, with elevation varying from 100 metres (330 ft) to 1,717 metres (5,633 ft). The major peaks in the sanctuary are Chemmunjimottai (1717m), Athirumalai (1594m), Arumukhamkunnu (1457m), Koviltherimalai (1313m) and Nachiyadikunnu (957m). Annual average rainfall is 2,500 millimetres (98 in). The major rivers are Karamana River and its tributaries.

== Wildlife ==
Forest types include West coast tropical evergreen, Southern hilltop tropical evergreen, West coast semi-evergreen, Southern moist mixed deciduous forest, Myristica swamp forest, sub-montane hill valley swamp forest etc.

=== Flora ===
Common tree species are Terminalia paniculata, Terminalia bellirica, Pterocarpus marsupium, Palaquium ellipticum, Mesua ferrea, Hopea parviflora, Bombax ceiba, Syzygium cumini, Lagerstroemia microcarpa, Albizia procera, Alstonia scholaris, etc.

=== Fauna ===
The sanctuary has several mammals, birds, reptiles and amphibians. 43 species of mammals, 233 species of birds, 46 species of reptiles, 13 species of amphibians and 27 species of fishes are reported from the sanctuary. The common mammals found are tiger, leopard, sloth bear, elephant, sambar (deer), bonnet macaque, Nilgiri langur, Nilgiri tahr.

== See also ==
- Kolakolli
- Tourism in Thiruvananthapuram
