= Neyyar Dam =

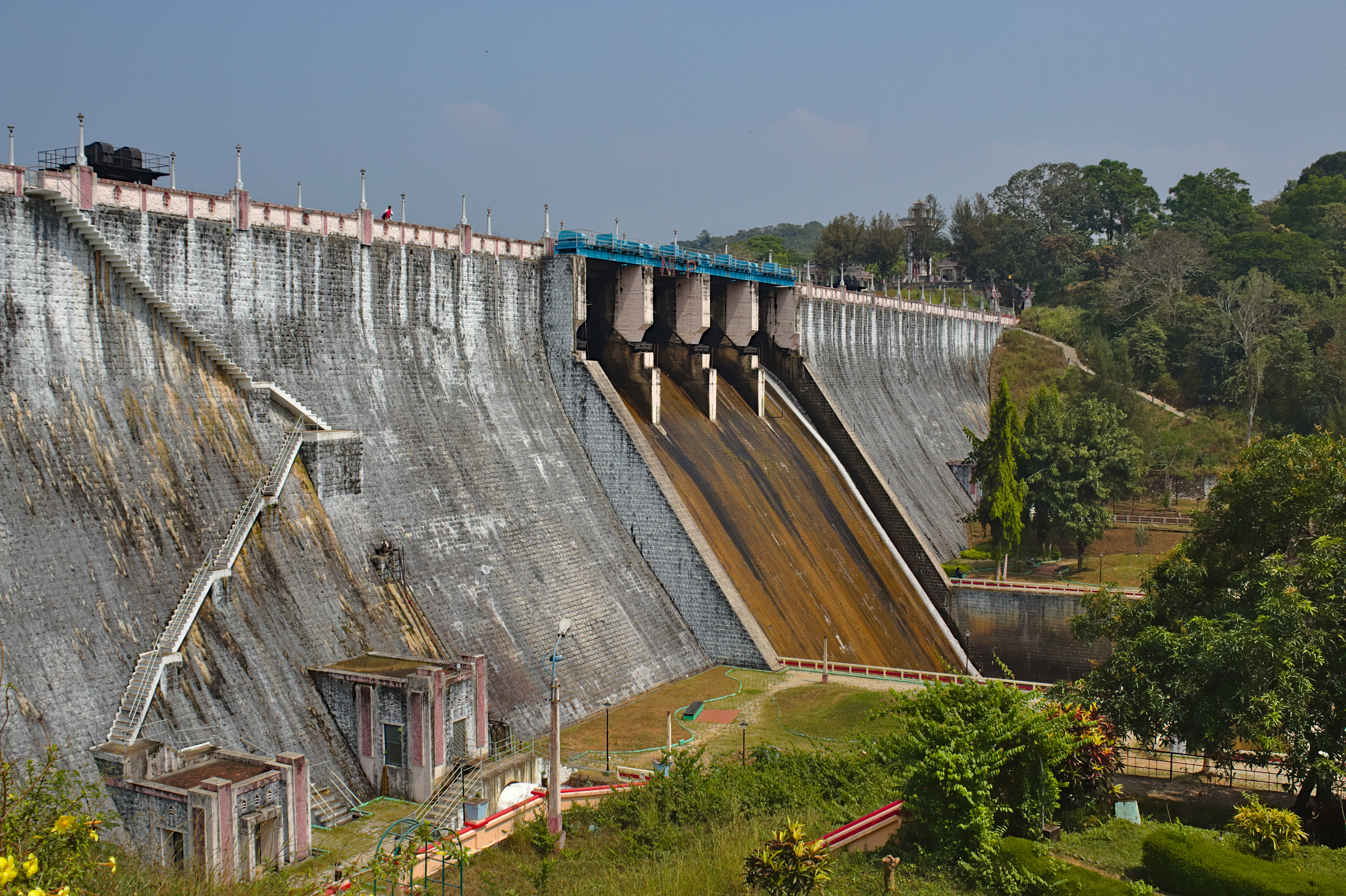
- Neyyar Dam

- Location within Kerala Location within India
- Location: Kerala, India
- Coordinates: 8°32′5″N 77°8′45″E
- Status: Operational
- Opening date: 1958; 68 years ago
- Operator: Government of Kerala

Dam and spillways
- Type of dam: Gravity dam
- Impounds: Neyyar river
- Height: 56 m (184 ft)
- Length: 294 m (965 ft)
- Dam volume: 105,000 m^{3} (3,708,040 ft^{3})
- Spillways: 4
- Spillway capacity: 809 m^{3}/s (28,570 cu ft/s)

Reservoir
- Total capacity: 1,060,000,000 m^{3} (859,356 acre⋅ft)
- Active capacity: 1,010,000,000 m^{3} (818,820 acre⋅ft)
- Surface area: 91 km^{2} (35 sq mi)

Neyyar dam is a gravity dam on the Neyyar River in Thiruvananthapuram district of Kerala, South India, located on the foot of the Western Ghats about 30 km from Thiruvananthapuram. It was established in 1958 and is a popular picnic spot. The Neyyardam was built in the land given by a famous agriculturist and landlord Mr. Karuvachi Krishnan Panicker, (Father of Kallikkad Kesavan Panicker (Father of Kallikad Ramachandran)) Maruthummootil, Kallikkad and many of his family members from Kallikkad.

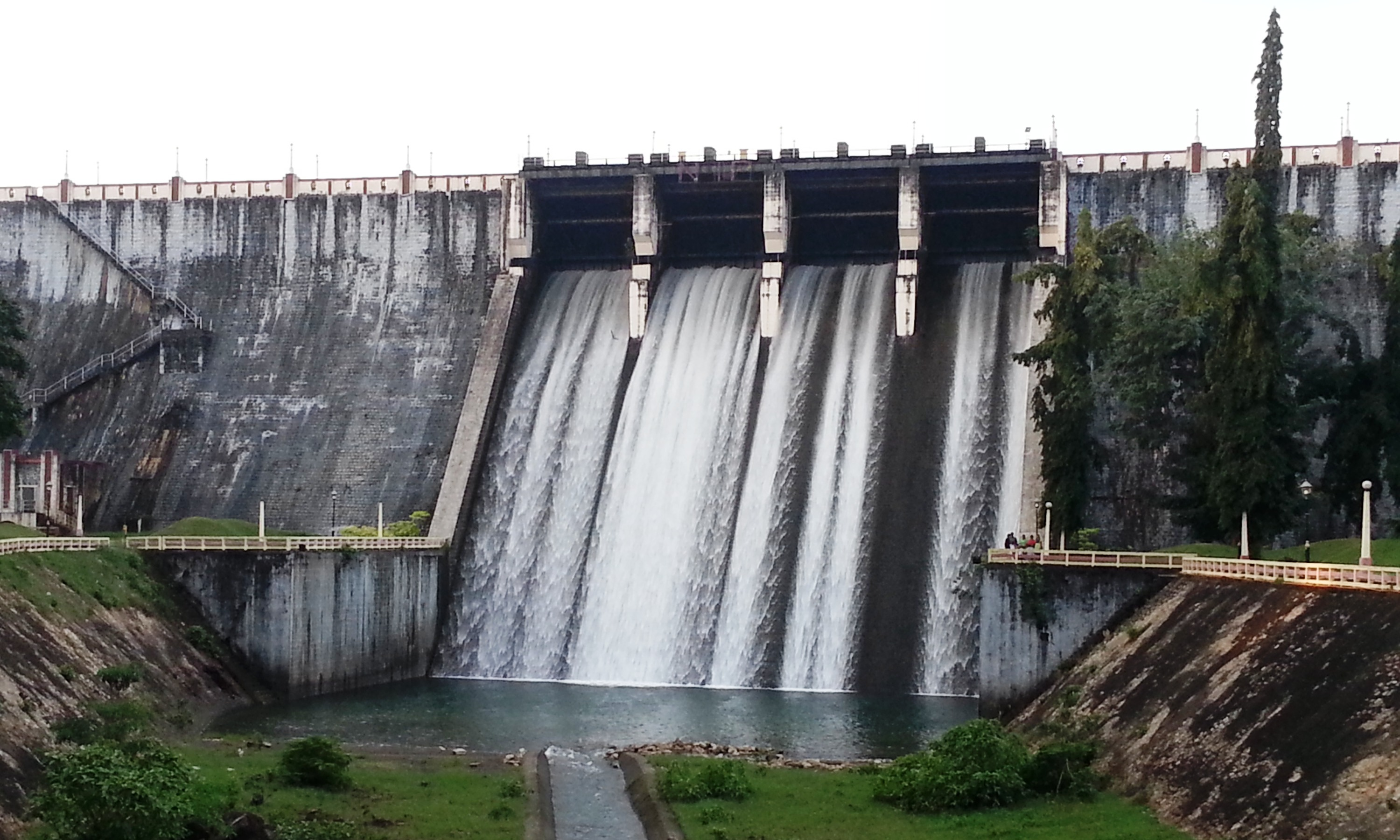
From below

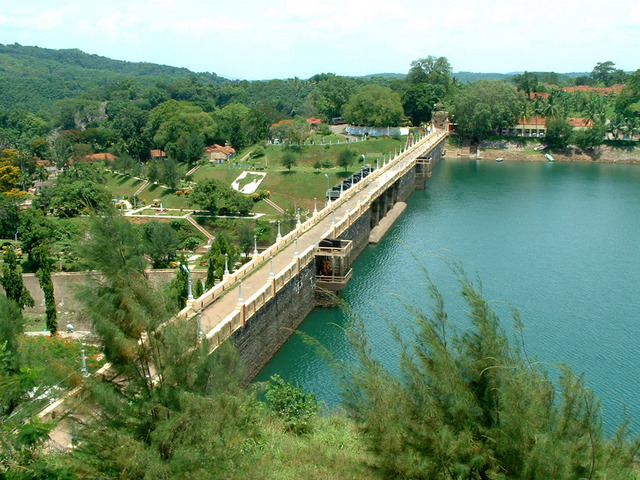
Reservoir side

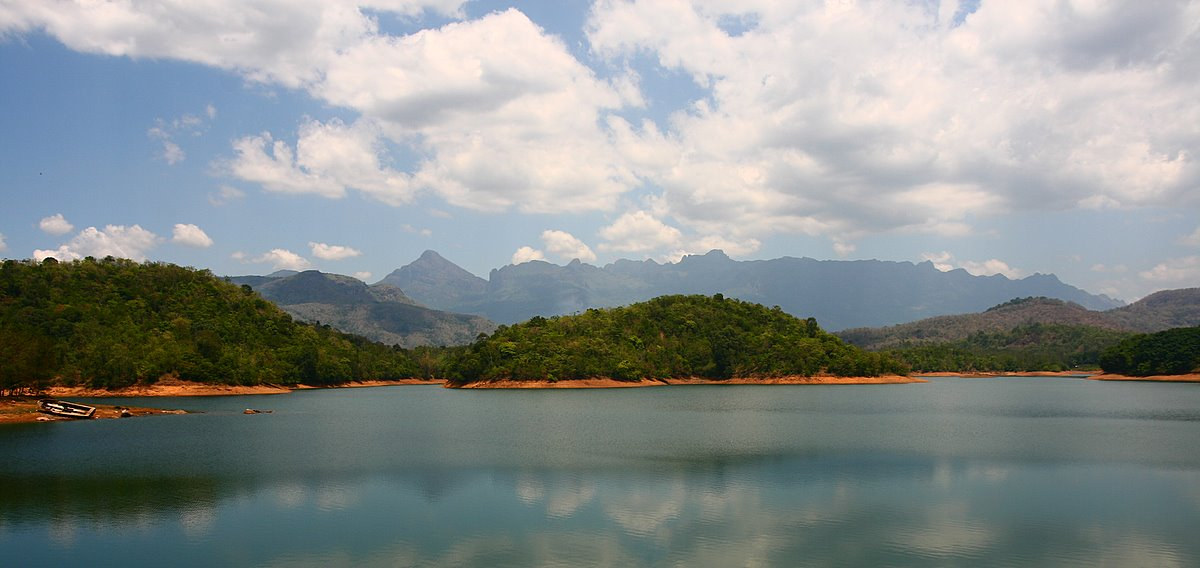
Reservoir

== History ==
Neyyar 2nd State (relates to both Madras and Kerala States) Government of Kerala started work on the project in their area in October 1956.

== Design ==
The Neyyar Dam is a rubble masonry gravity-type dam with a height of 56 m (184 ft) and length of 295 m (968 ft). Its structural volume is 105,000 m^{3} (3,708,040 ft^{3}). The dam creates a reservoir of 106,200,000 m^{3} (86,098 acre⋅ft) of which 101,000,000 m^{3} (81,882 acre⋅ft) is active (useful) capacity. The reservoir's surface area is 91 km^{2} (35 sq mi) and the dam's spillway has an 809.40 m^{3}/s (28,584 cu ft/s) maximum discharge capacity. One of the contractors who built the Neyyar Dam was Mr Jagathy Chellappan Contractor of Jagathy, Thiruvananthapuram.

== Wildlife ==
Wild life includes Gaur, Sloth bear, Nilgiri Tahr, Jungle cat, Nilgiri langur, Wild elephants and Sambar deer.

== Activities ==
Yoga

Neyyar Dam is home to the Sivananda Yoga Vedanta Dhanwanthari Ashram where people can take courses in yoga and practice meditation. The trees that are growing inside the ashram are large due to care by the people.

Boating

Tourists can hire a speed boat for Rs 250 per head to view the surrounding forests.

Crocodile Rehabilitation and Research Centre

A crocodile farm was set up in 1977. It also includes a habitat for otters near the administrative complex. The Crocodile Rehabilitation and Research Centre in Neyyar Wildlife Sanctuary was named initially by the Kerala government after the late naturalist Steve Irwin as Steve Irwin National Park.

== Attractions ==
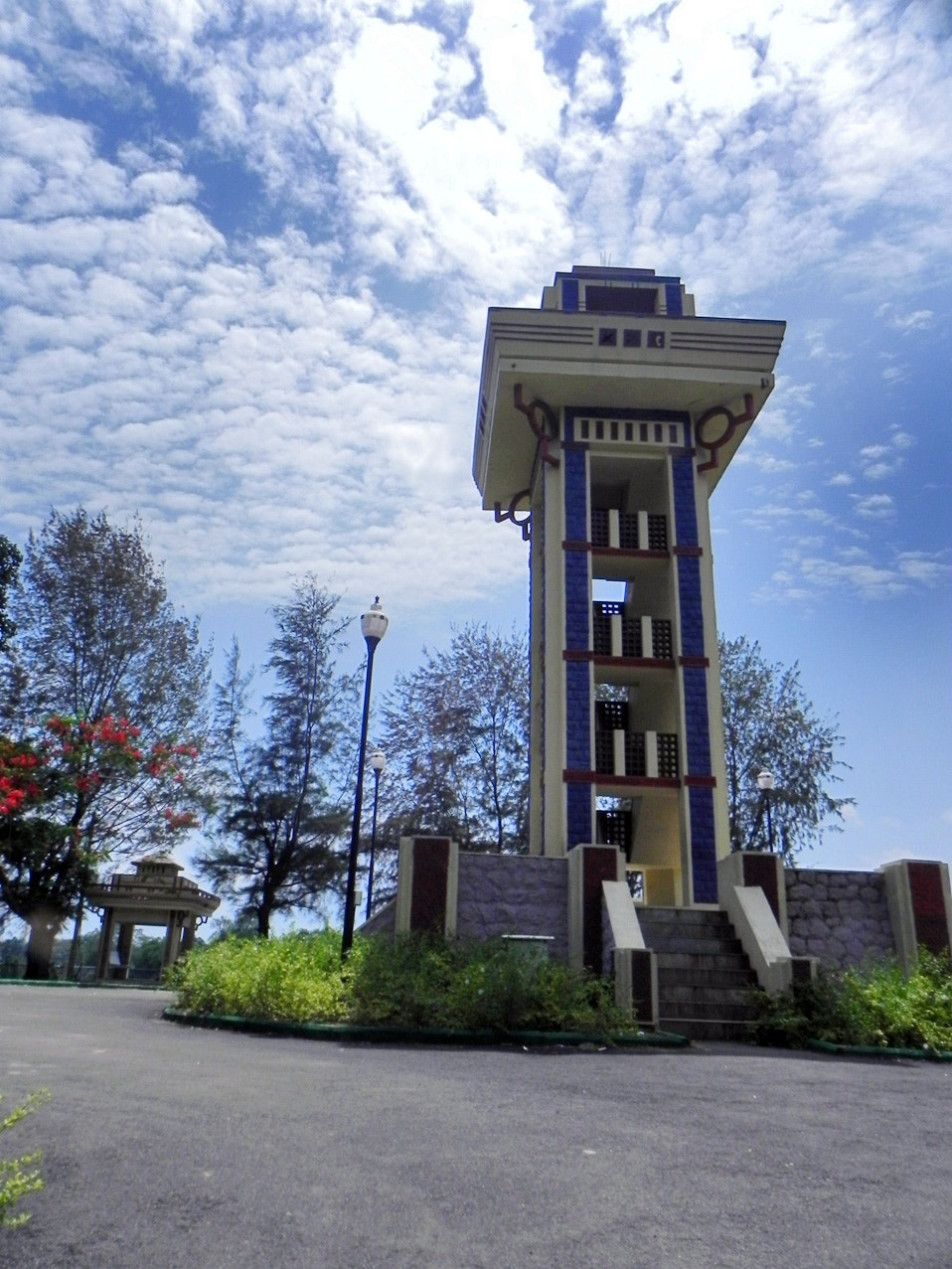
Watch tower at Neyyar Dam

- Lion safari park (Not open anymore due to the lions not breeding)
- Boating
- Deer park
- Crocodile Rehabilitation and Research Centre
- Miniature wild life sanctuary
- Lake garden
- Swimming pool
- Watch tower
- Elephant riding

== Transport ==
The nearest airport is Thiruvananthapuram International Airport, 38 km away, and the nearest railway station is at Thiruvananthapuram, 30 km away.
