= Kappil =

Kappil may refer to:

- Kappil, Alappuzha, Kerala, India
- Kappil, Thiruvananthapuram, Kerala, India
  - Kappil Bhagavathy Temple
  - Kappil railway station
