= Edava =

Edava Edava
- village
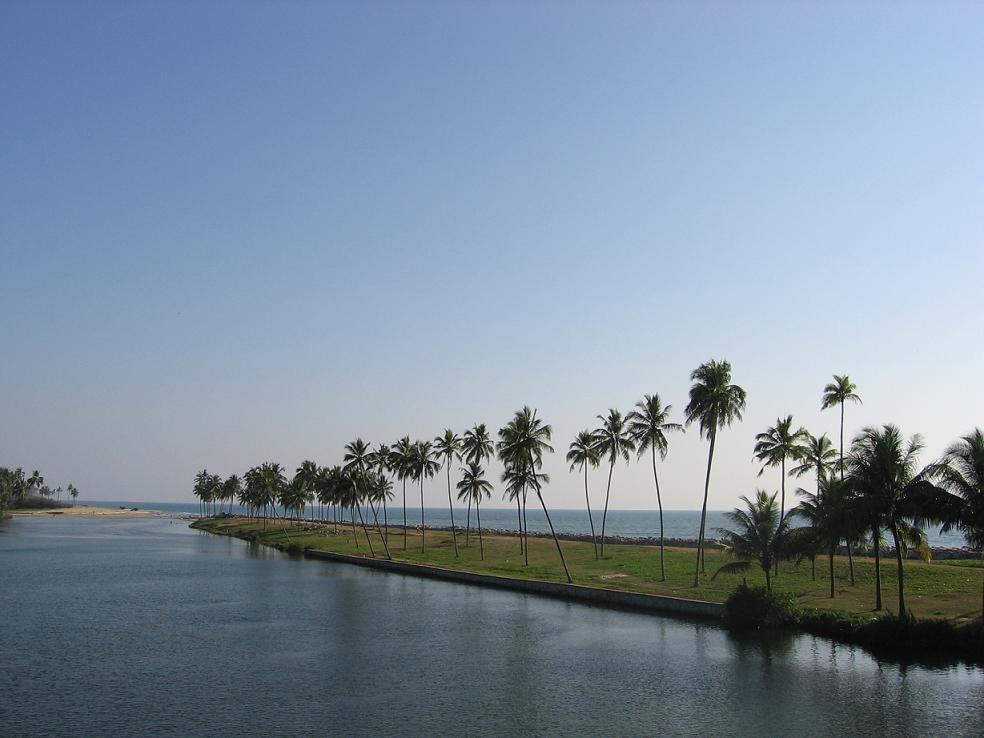
- Kappil beach and backwaters in Edava

- Location in Kerala, India Edava (India)
- Coordinates: 8.7671°N 76.6901°E
- Country: India
- State: Kerala
- District: Thiruvananthapuram
- Taluk: Varkala Taluk

Government
  - Body: Gram panchayat

Area
  - Total: 9.14 km^{2} (3.53 sq mi)

Population (2011)
  - Total: 25,994
  - Density: 2,840/km^{2} (7,370/sq mi)
- Demonym: Edavakaran

Languages
  - Official: Malayalam, English
- Time zone: UTC+5:30 (IST)
- PIN: 695311
- Telephone code: 0470
- Vehicle registration: KL-81
- Nearest city: Varkala
- Literacy: 98.97%
- Vidhan Sabha constituency: Varkala
- Lok Sabha constituency: Attingal

Edava is a panchayat in Varkala Taluk, and lies at the northernmost tip of Thiruvananthapuram district in the state of Kerala, India. Edava is located 5 km north of Varkala, 21 km south of port city Kollam, and 44 km north of capital city Thiruvananthapuram.

== Geography ==
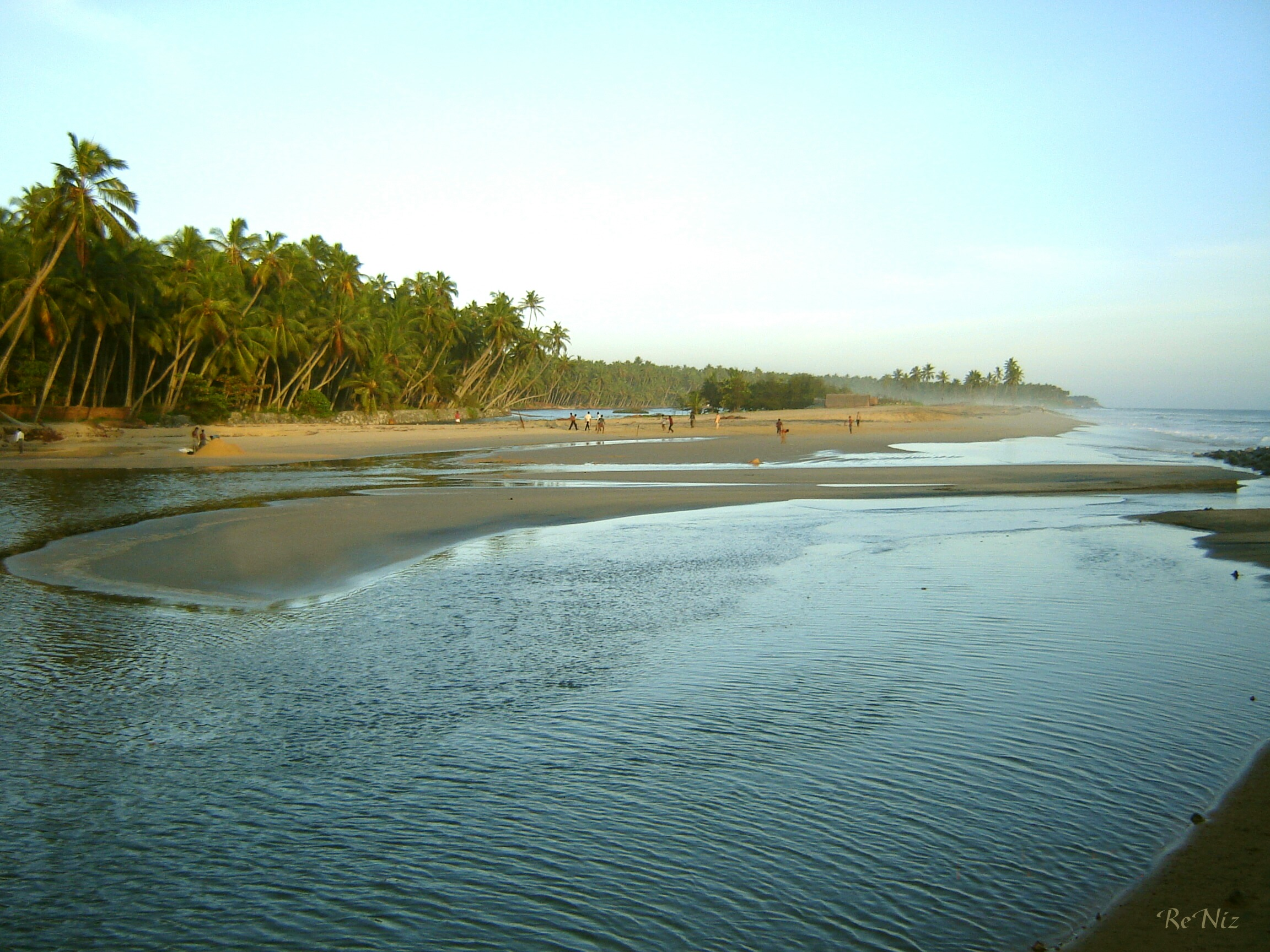
Kappil Beach & Estuary

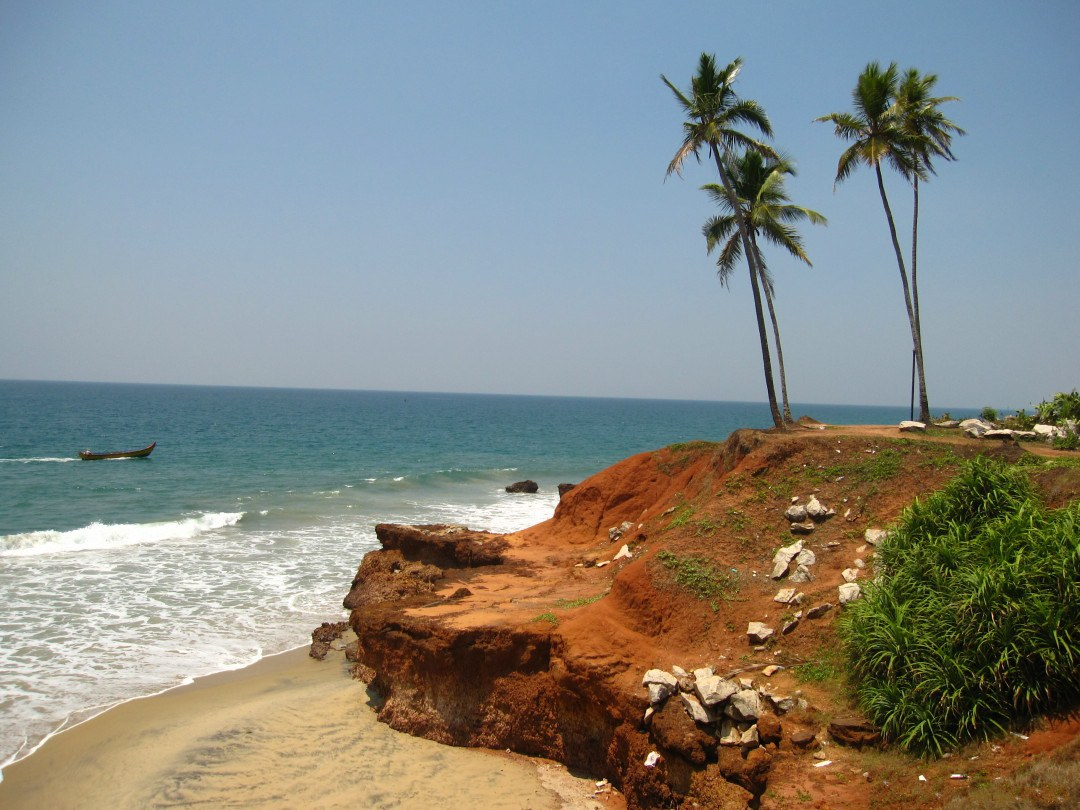
Arabian Sea view from the Redhills, Vettakada

== Demographics ==
As of 2001 India census, Edava had a population of 26,903, with 12,292 males and 14,611 females.

== Transportation ==
Edava has two railway stations, Edavai railway station and Kappil railway station.

== Prominent people ==
- Thakiyudeen Abdul Wahid was an Indian entrepreneur and aviator. He was the Founder and Managing Director of the now-defunct East-West Airlines, the first scheduled private airline in the country.
- G. K. Pillai, movie actor
- Thaha, film director
- Balachandra Menon, Film actor and director
