= Kurakkanni =

- village
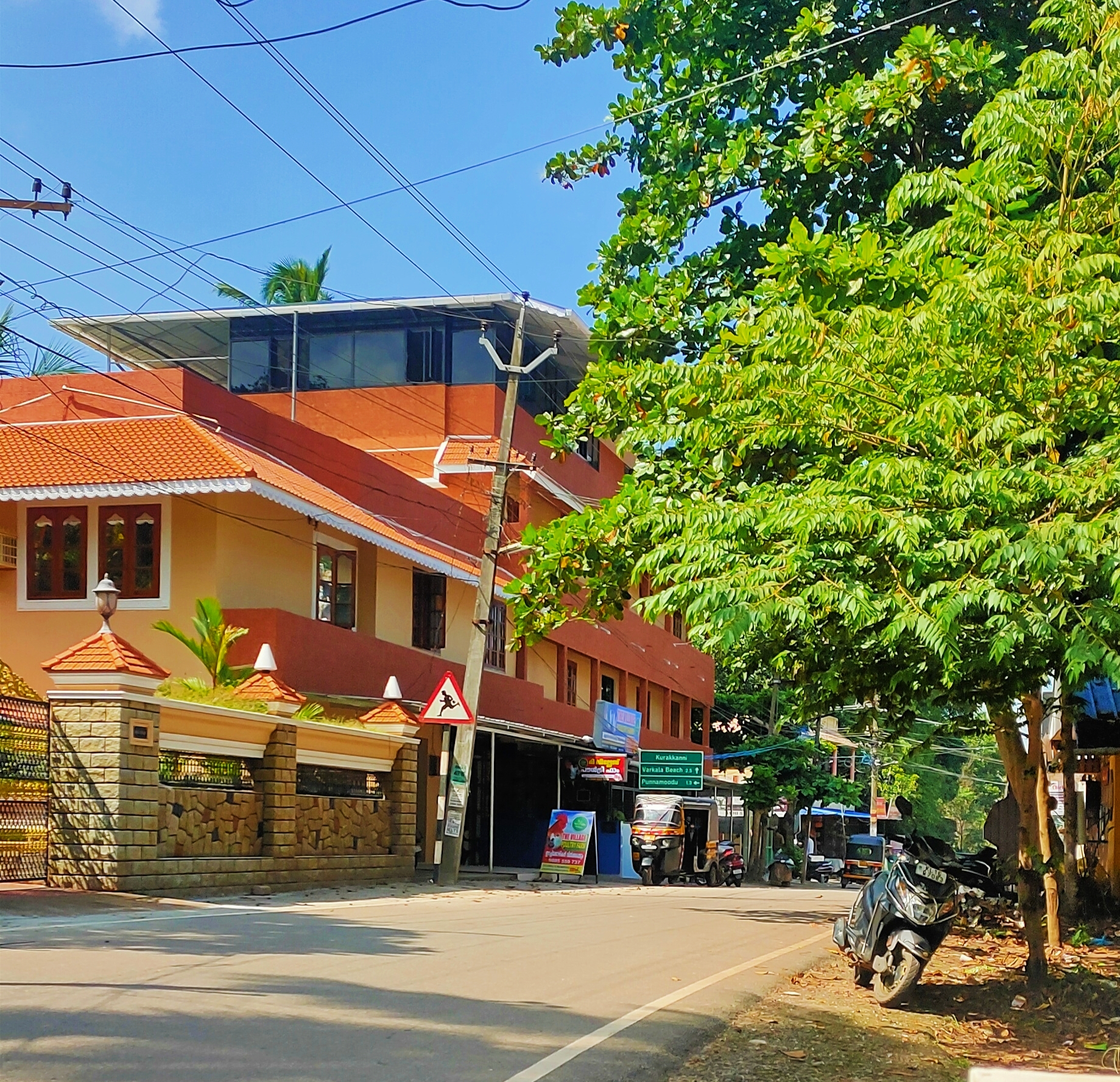
- Kurakkanni Junction

- Location in Kerala, India Kurakkanni (India)
- Coordinates: 8.74392°N 76.7062°E
- Country: India
- State: Kerala
- District: Thiruvananthapuram
- Established: 1910
- Founder: Travancore Kingdom

Government
  - Type: Local Self Government
  - Body: Varkala Municipality

Languages
  - Official: Malayalam, English
- Time zone: UTC+5:30 (IST)
- PIN: 695141
- Telephone code: 0470
- Vehicle registration: KL-81
- Niyamasabha constituency: Varkala
- Lok Sabha constituency: Thiruvananthapuram

Kurakkanni is a locality and ward number 34 of Varkala Municipality in Thiruvananthapuram district, Kerala, India. It is located 3 km (1.9 mi) north-west of Varkala, 33 km (21 mi) south of Kollam and 46 km (29 mi) north of Thiruvananthapuram.

Varkala Helipad, Govt Guest House, Varkala Palace, Varkala Aquarium, Varkala Hatchery and the National Centre for Performing Arts are located in Kurakkanni.

== Public safety ==
As tourism has increased in recent years, with many homes rented out as home stays, there has been an increase in crime and other problems with public safety, including the discovery of a sex racket in a home stay, illegal narcotics sales also in a home stay, a suicide of a Ukrainian tourist, and multiple fatal traffic accidents in the area.
