= Varkala Sivagiri railway station =

Railway station in Trivandrum, Kerala

Varkala

General information
- Location: SH64, Varkala, Thiruvananthapuram, Kerala; India
- Coordinates: 8.741°N 76.723°E
- Elevation: 58 m (190 ft)
- System: Regional rail and Light rail station
- Owner: Government of India
- Operator: Indian Railways
- Line: Kollam–Thiruvananthapuram trunk line
- Platforms: 3
- Tracks: 5
- Connections: Varkala municipal bus station (opposite); Taxi stand; Varkala Helipad(2km); National Waterway 3(Under renovation); Thiruvananthapuram International Airport(40km)

Construction
- Structure type: Standard (on-ground station)
- Parking: Yes
- Cycle facilities: Yes
- Accessible: Disabled access

Other information
- Status: Functioning
- Station code: VAK
- Zone(s): Southern Railway zone
- Division(s): Thiruvananthapuram
- Classification: NSG-3

History
- Opened: 1918; 108 years ago
- Rebuilt: 1974; 52 years ago
- Electrified: Yes, 25 kV AC 50 Hz
- Former names: Varkala railway station till 2005; 21 years ago

Passengers
- 2018–19: 11,427/day Annual passengers – 41,70,860
- Rank: 2nd in Thiruvananthapuram district, 14th in Kerala

Services
Preceding station	Indian Railways	Following station
Edavai towards	Southern Railway zone Kollam–Thiruvananthapuram trunk line	Akathumuri towards
Route map
Location
- Location within Kerala Location within India

Varkala Sivagiri railway station (station code: VAK) is an NSG–3 category Indian railway station in Thiruvananthapuram railway division of Southern Railway zone. is a major railway station in Kerala serving the town of Varkala and northern areas of Thiruvananthapuram district. It is the second-busiest railway station in the state capital district Thiruvananthapuram in terms of passenger movement and 14th busiest in Kerala State. Around 54 trains halts in this station which handled more than 17,730 passengers daily with 3 platforms. It is on Kollam–Thiruvananthapuram trunk line. Station is well connected to major metropolitan & tier 2 cities like Thiruvananthapuram, Hyderabad, Kochi, Delhi, Bangalore, Mangalore, Chennai, Mumbai, Vijayawada, Kolkata, Goa etc.

== Traffic ==
In 2025–26 FY about 76.54lakh passengers were passed through this station and make a profit of 20.12 cr. Varkala is the second-busiest railway station after Thiruvananthapuram Central. In close proximity to the station is Varkala Municipal Bus Station. It serves the people from northern part of entire Thiruvananthapuram district and southern part of Kollam district.

== History ==
The metre-gauge railway line passing through the Varkala town was completed in 1917 and opened for traffic on 1 January 1918. The line was then up to Chakkai near Thiruvananthapuram. On 4 November 1931 it was extended to Thiruvananthapuram Central. Later, considering the steady increase in passenger traffic the metre-gauge was converted into broad-gauge which was inaugurated by the Prime Minister on 13 September 1977· There are two approach roads from Kallambalam and Parippally to Varkala railway station from the National Highway 66.

== Name of the station ==
The station name used to be 'Varkala' till 2005. It was renamed "Varkala Sivagiri" after the samadhi of Sri Narayana Guru, situated in Varkala in the year 2005. Most of the trains are allowed temporary halt at this station during a week period of the famous "Sivagiri Theerthadanam" (Sivagiri Pilgrimage).

== Significance ==
Varkala is a major commercial and industrial town in the district and also Varkala is the nearest major railway station for Attingal, Kilimanoor, Kallambalam, Chirayinkeezhu, Alamcode towns. Varkala Beach which is one of the popular tourist destination in India is at a distance of 3.1 km (1.9 mi) from the railway station. Sivagiri Mutt founded by the social reformer Sree Narayana Guru is situated at the top of the Sivagiri hill in Varkala. Janardana Swami Temple is a Vaishnavite shrine which is estimated to be 2000 years old. Kappil Beach & Backwaters situated 8 km (5.0 mi) from Varkala is major tourist destination in Varkala.

== Annual passenger earnings of Varkala railway station ==
Passenger Earnings
Year	Earnings (in crores)	Variation
2015–16	₹9.4484 crore (US$980,000)	NA
2016–17	₹9.8191 crore (US$1.0 million)	▲₹0.3707 crore (US$38,000)
2017–18	₹10.4254 crore (US$1.1 million)	▲₹0.6063 crore (US$63,000)
2018–19	₹11.1201 crore (US$1.2 million)	▲₹0.6947 crore (US$72,000)
2019–20	₹11.5095 crore (US$1.2 million)	▲₹0.3894 crore (US$40,000)
2020-21	₹2.0588 crore (US$210,000)	▼₹9.4507 crore (US$980,000)
2021-22	₹7.4429 crore (US$770,000)	▲₹5.3841 crore (US$560,000)
2022-23	₹16.6935 crore (US$1.7 million)	▲₹9.2506 crore (US$960,000)
2023-24	₹21.0747 crore (US$2.2 million)	▲₹4.3812 crore (US$450,000)
2024-25	₹22.5184 crore (US$2.3 million)	▲₹1.4437 crore (US$150,000)
2025-26	₹28.0597 crore (US$2.9 million)	▲₹5.5413 crore (US$580,000)

== See also ==
- Thiruvananthapuram Central railway station
- Kappil railway station
- Kollam Junction railway station
- Paravur railway station
- Karunagappalli railway station
- Punalur
- Kazhakuttam railway station
