= Palakkavu Bhagavathi Temple =

Edava Palakkavu Bhagavathi Temple
- ഇടവാ പാലക്കാവ് ഭഗവതി ക്ഷേത്രം
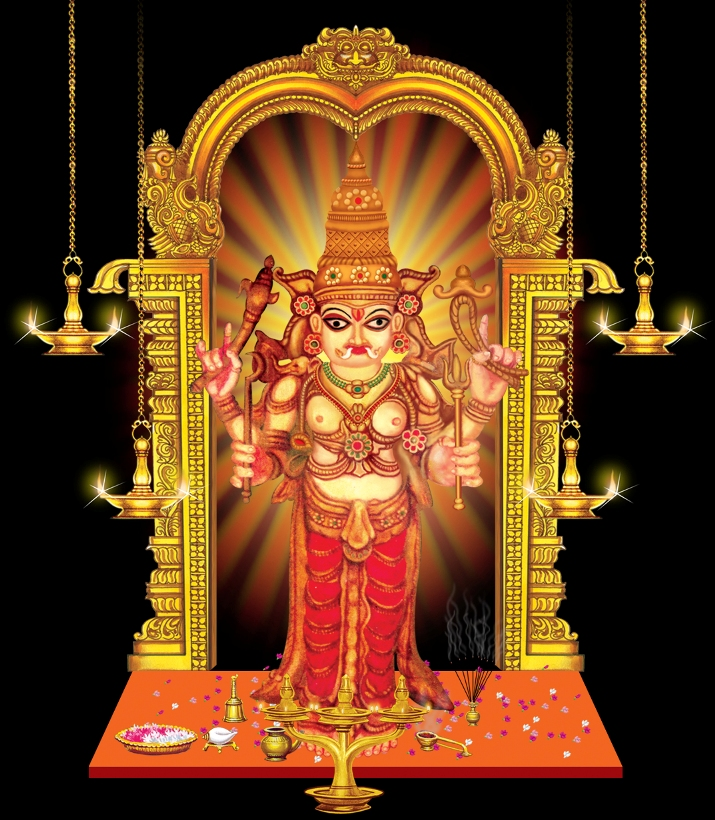

- Location of Palakkavu temple

Religion
- Affiliation: Hinduism
- District: Thiruvananthapuram
- Deity: Palakkavilamma (Goddess Bhadrakali)
- Festival: Karthika Thirunal Mahothsavam (On karthika naksatra in kumbham month)

Location
- Location: Edava
- State: Kerala
- Country: India
- Interactive map of Edava Palakkavu Bhagavathi Temple
- Coordinates: 8°45′54″N 76°41′22″E

Website
- http://www.palakkavudevi.in/

The Edava Palakkavu Bhagavathi temple (ഇടവാ പാലക്കാവ് ഭഗവതി ക്ഷേത്രം) is one of the ancient temples in south India. It is situated at Edava in Thiruvananthapuram District, India. The temple is situated 5.7 km North of Varkala City.Bhadrakali Devi is the presiding deity of this temple.

A festival is conducted during the month of "Kumbham". This is an occasion when the entire village, irrespective of religious differences, erupt in festive mood. The streets are made colourful on the festival days with colourful processions. Tender coconut fronds and plantain leaf-stalks are also used for street decoration.

== Deities and sub-deities ==
The Goddess Bhadrakali is the main deity in this temple. One important aspect of the temple is that the deity appears as Bhadrakali, an avatar of Palakkavilamma. Karthika is considered as the star of the deity. There are many upadevathas (sub-deities) adjacent to the temple, and it has been remade according to the Deva Prashnam by expert astrologers recently. The main upadevathas on the premises are

- Goddess Annapoorna
- Lord Ganesh
- Navagraham
- Adithyan
- Hanuman
- Brahmarakshass
- Yogeswaran
- Nagaru Kavu

== Festivals ==
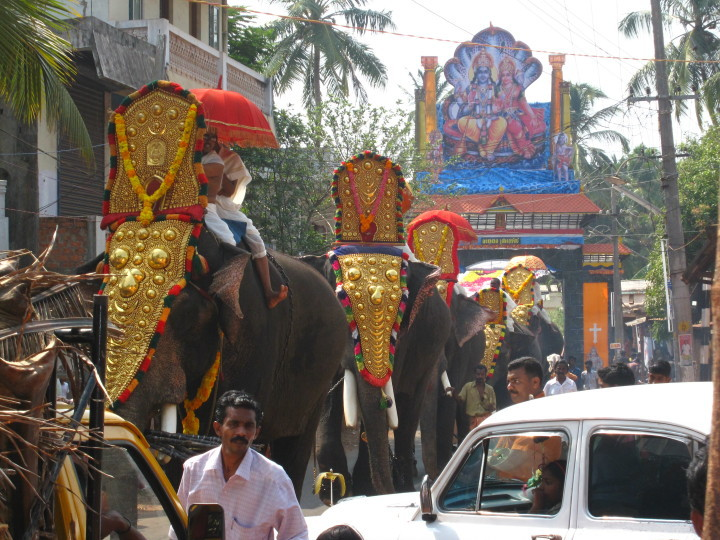
Palakkav Temple Festival

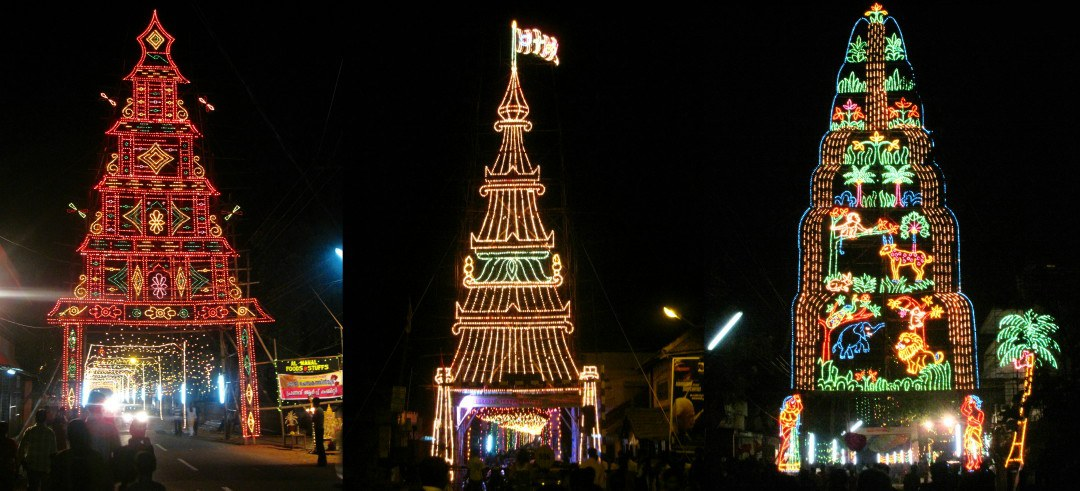
Street decoration on festival season

The Karthika Thirunal Mahothsavam, the major festival of the temple, is held in karthika naskathra in the Malayalam month of Kumbham, lasts for 10 days and ends with Ghosayathra (procession) and Ezhunnallathu (procession). Ten days of festival starts with many cultural and traditional programs in subsequent days. The main attractions of this festival are Thrikodiyettu, Ahaspooja, Sreebhoothabali, Uthsavabali, kalamzhuthum pattum, Thottam pattu, Ponkkala, Pallivetta, Ghosayathra, Aarattu, Thookapayattu, Garudanparappu and thrikodiyirakku. In 2014, Karthika Thirunal Mahothsavam was from 26 February to 7 March.

=== Other Festivals ===
- Sreemadh bhagavatha sapthaha yagnam - Every year there has been conducting Bhagavatha Sapthaha yajnam, during May/June. This includes detailed description of Bhagavatham followed by religious speeches, cultural and traditional programs. The purpose of Sapthaham is to provide a positive energy to the believers by reading the Bhagavatham in seven days. Kuchela Jayanthi and Rugmini Swayamvaram are the most important parts of Sapthaham.
- Prathista varshikam - The Prathista varshikam is an anniversary conducted on Pooyam nakshatra in Malayalam month medam. On the day have special pooja and Kalasabhishekam
- Mandalakalam - Festival in connection with the annual Utsavam of Sabarimala

=== Other Important Days ===
- Every Pooyam day
- Every Ayilam day
- 1st day in all Malayalam month
- Every Chaturthi
- Chingam 1st
- Thiruvonam
- Navarathry days
- Vijayadasami day
- Karthika in Vrschikam
- Thiruvathira in Dhanu
- Every last Friday in Malayalam month
- Medam 1st (Vishu)
- Chithira in Medam
- Pooyam in Edavam

== Darsan ==
- Morning - 5.00am to 10.30am
- Evening - 4.30pm to 7.30pm

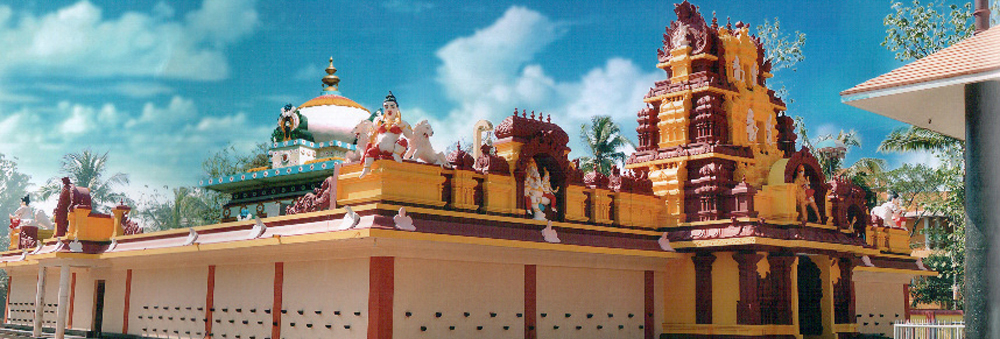

== See also ==
- Edava
- Bhadrakali
- List of Hindu temples in Kerala
- Temples of Kerala
