= Janardanaswamy Temple =

Hindu temple in Varkala, Kerala

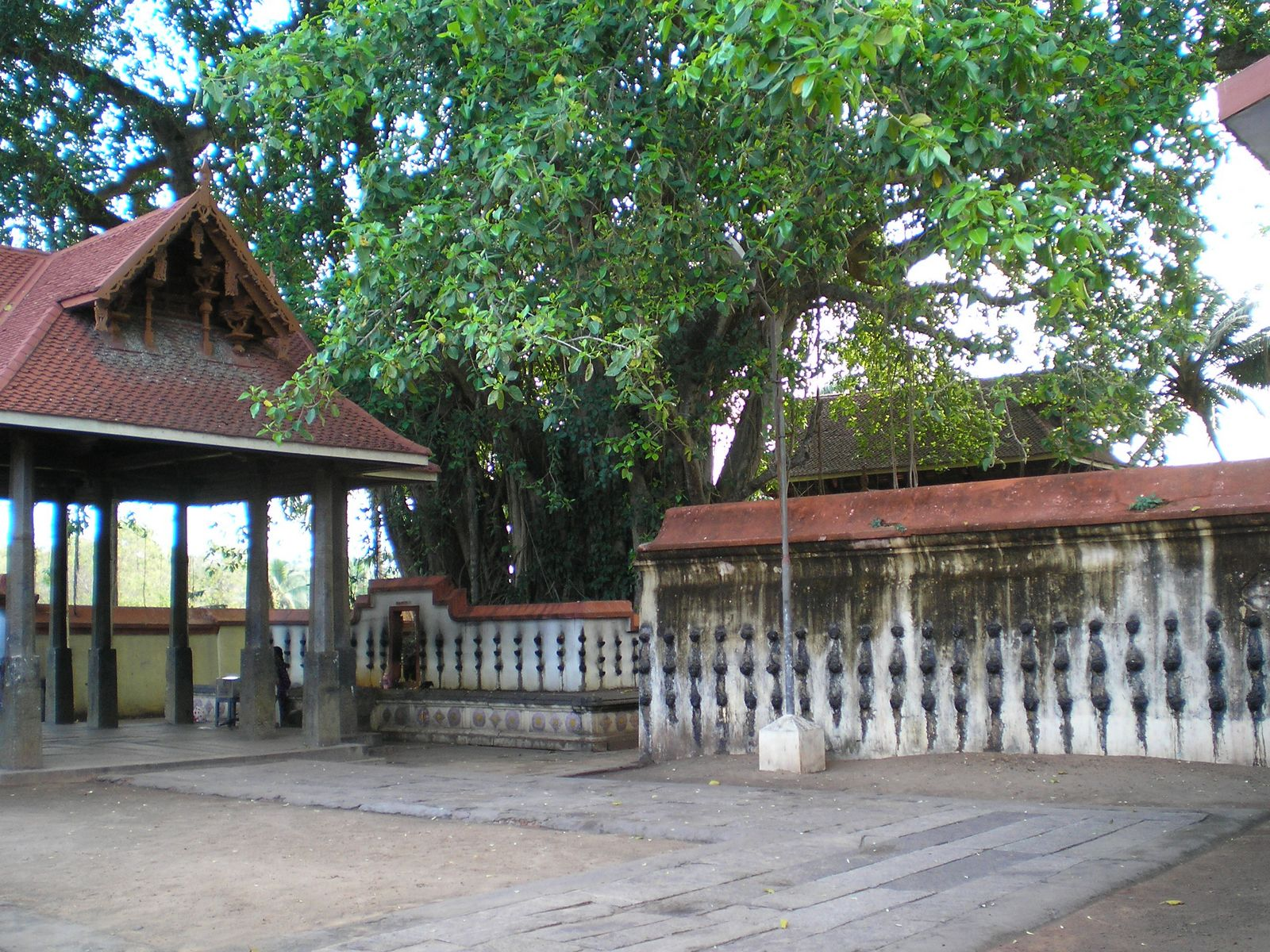

- Sri Janardanaswamy Temple, Varkala, Thiruvananthapuram, Kerala

Religion
- Affiliation: Hinduism
- District: Thiruvananthapuram
- Deity: Janardanaswamy (Vishnu)
- Festivals: Annual flag-hoisting pallivetta Aarattu festival in panguni uthram on Meenam or Falguna month Krishna Janmashtami; Karkadaka Vavu

Location
- Location: Varkala
- State: Kerala
- Country: India
- Interactive map of Janardanaswamy Temple
- Coordinates: 8°43′54.8″N 76°42′36.0″E

Architecture
- Type: Ancient Pandya - Kerala architecture
- Established: Originally by Lord Brahma; Restored by Pandya king around 1st century BC

Specifications
- Temples: 5 (Vishnu, Hanuman, Shiva, Ganga, and Shastha)
- Elevation: 53.28 m (175 ft)

The Janardanaswamy Temple, also known as the Varkala Temple, is a Hindu temple situated in Janardhanapuram, Varkala city, Thiruvananthapuram district, Kerala, India. The temple is dedicated to the worship of deity Vishnu in the form of Janardanaswamy, locally known as Varkaleswara (the lord of Varkala). It is a renowned temple within its locale, and is thousands of years old.

== History ==
=== Legend ===
According to the temple legend, attracted by the music from Narada’s veena, Vishnu followed him and reached Satyaloka. Brahma saw Vishnu and prostrated before him. Vishnu soon realized that he had reached Satyaloka, but did not realize that Brahma was prostrating before him, and returned to Vaikuntha. It seemed then as if Brahma was falling at the feet of Narada and all the devas who were looking on laughed. This angered Brahma, and he cursed the devas to be born as humans on Earth. The devas repented their folly and begged to be forgiven. Brahma replied that the curse would be withdrawn when they had performed a penance to please Vishnu. The devas asked where they should do the penance, and Brahma replied that the place would be where Narada’s cloth had fallen: Varkala. The devas performed the penance accordingly to relieve the curse.

There exist other similar legends about the origin of the temple. Another states that long ago, Brahma came to earth to perform a yajna (fire sacrifice) in the location of Varkala. He was so immersed in doing yajna that he forgot his role of creation. Vishnu came to Varkala in the form of a very old man to remind Brahma about it. The Brahmins assisting Brahma received the old man and gave him food. But, whatever he ate, his hunger was not satiated. Brahma’s assistants told him about this. Brahma realized that his guest was Vishnu himself. He immediately went to Vishnu and found him trying to eat abhojana (unappetising food). Brahma prevented Vishnu from eating it, informing him that the act would cause the pralaya (deluge). Vishnu asked Brahma to stop the yajna and recommence his role of creation. He also showed him his vishvarupa (universal form).

After this, one day, Narada, followed by Vishnu, was walking over the sky over Varkala. Brahma, who came there, saluted Vishnu. The nine prajapatis, who only saw Narada, laughed at Brahma because they thought that Brahma was saluting his son. Brahma corrected them and they regretted having committed a sinful deed. Brahma told them that the proper place to pray for their redemption would be shown to them by Narada. Narada threw the valkala (tree bark hide) he was wearing towards the earth. It fell over the site Varkala. The prajapatis wanted a pond to do their atonement. Narada requested Vishnu for the same, and the deity created one using his Sudarshana Chakra (celestial discus). The prajapatis did tapas there and were pardoned for their sins. It is believed that the devas constructed a temple of Vishnu there and worshipped him in the form of Janardana.

=== Literature ===
Varkala, a seaside suburban town of Thiruvananthapuram, is also known as Janardanapuram or Udayamarthandapuram or Balit, and is a sacred pilgrim center. The Varkala Janardanaswamy Temple is among the 108 Abhimana Kshethrams, a group of Vaishnavite shrines that are considered among the foremost existing Vishnu Temples, and are repeatedly mentioned in extant ancient texts like the Puranas and Itihasas. The Bhagavata Purana and the Mahabharata mention that Balarama, the elder brother of Krishna, visited this shrine during his pilgrimage to the Kanyakumari Temple and other temples in the south.

It is believed that praying at the temple and taking a bath at the nearby Papanasam beach will wash away one's sins. Varkala is also considered as the best place to do pitrkarma, which is why it is sometimes also called "Dakshina Kashi" (literally the "Kashi of the South"). It is also called "Gaya of the South". Varkala draws hundreds of pilgrims and visitors all year round.

== Temple ==
=== Deity ===
The presiding deity of this temple, Janardanaswamy, is found standing and facing east. His right hand performs "Aachamanam" and is raised towards his mouth; as per legend, the world will come to an end when his hand reaches his mouth. It is believed this will happen at the end of the Kali Yuga.

=== Structure ===
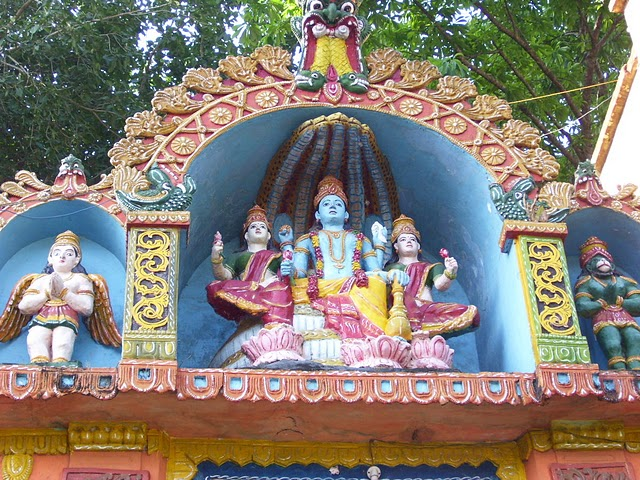
Janardhanaswamy Temple entrance

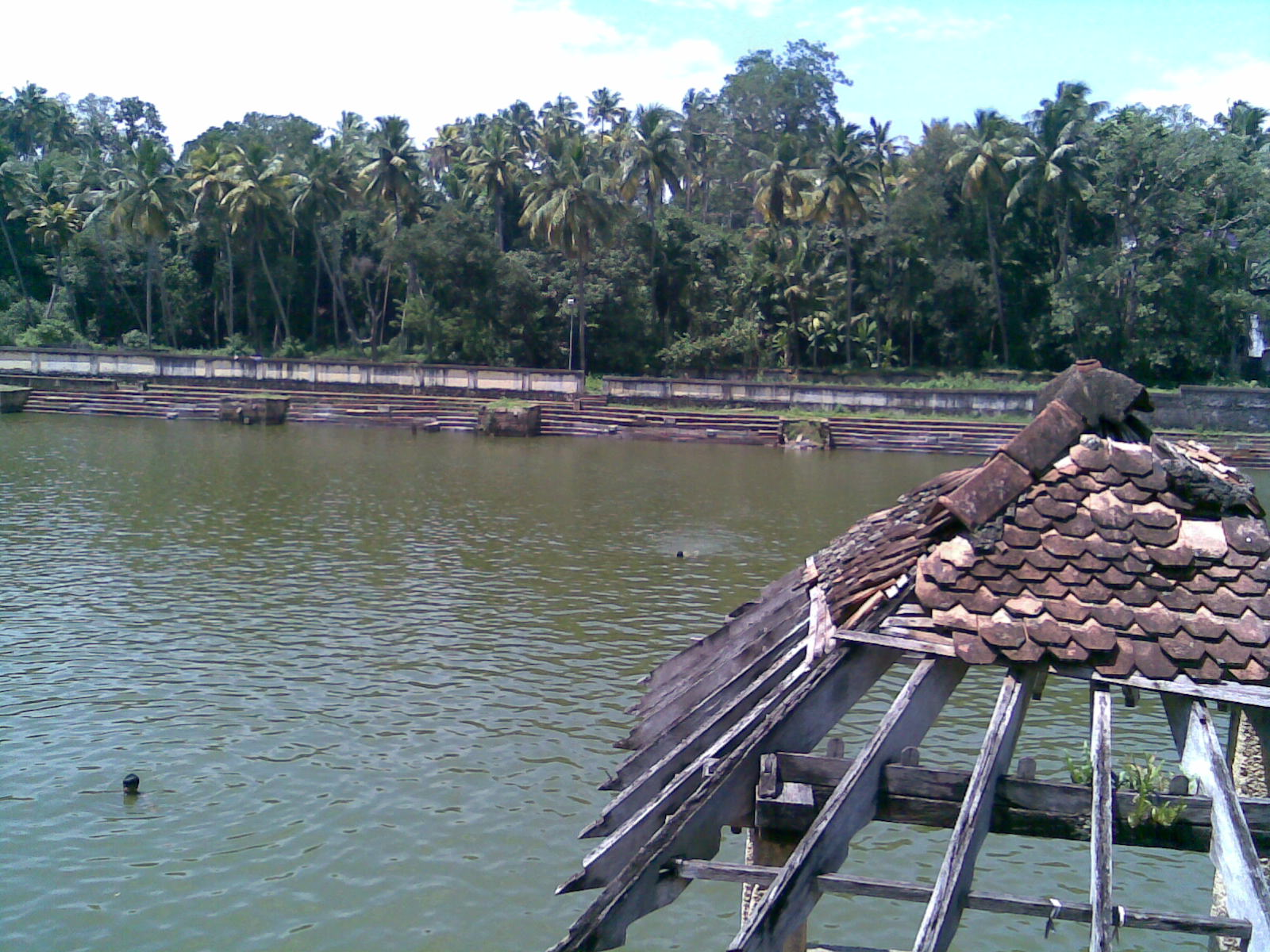
Pond of the temple

The temple sits on a tableland adjoining the sea and is reached by a long flight of stairs. The entrance to the inner shrine is flanked by the idols of Hanuman and Garuda on either side. In the main shrine is the idol of Janardana with Sridevi and Bhudevi. The main idol has a striking appearance with four arms having all the attributes of Vishnu. There are small temples of Shiva, Ganesha, Shastha, and Naga devata in this temple. In the south-western corner and on the north-eastern side of the outer enclosure are the shrines of Sasta and Shiva with Nandi.

The temple is a fine example of Kerala art and architecture. Aspects of the temple—including the circular "sanctum sanctorum" surmounted by a conical dome of copper sheets, the square mandapa with wooden carvings of Navagrahas on the ceiling and copper-plated roof, the quadrangular enclosures (prakaram) around them, and a hall containing a Bali Pitha in front of the inner temple—are characteristic features of Kerala architecture and the highly embellished temples of South India.

On the southern side of the temple, two bells are tied. There is a story about them as well. A Dutch ship was passing this way and suddenly, the ship could not move despite all efforts. The people told the captain of the ship to tie a bell in the Janardana temple, and the captain and his assistant came ashore and tied the bells. As soon as they did, the ship started moving. The names inscribed in the bell are 'Peter von Belson' and 'Michelle Evarald'.

The temple has an ancient bell removed from a shipwreck, donated by the captain of a Dutch vessel which sank near Varkala without casualties.

One of the inscriptions indicates that the temple was partially renovated during the reign of Umayamma Rani who ruled this region in 1677–84 CE.

Besides the sea view, there is also the backwater journey by canal hewn out of the tremendous heights of hills on either side of it. The vegetation on either side of the canal has given rise to a series of springs from which sparkling water gushes throughout the year. The water is said to have medicinal properties.

=== Location ===
The temple is situated about 10.9 km west of Kallambalam on NH 66 near the sea, 25 km north of Thiruvananthapuram city, 8 km south of famous backwater destination Kappil and 2 km from Varkala Railway Station,14 km northwest of Attingal municipality.

== Religious significance ==
Several centuries ago, the millennia-old temple had become dilapidated. At that time, the then Pandya king was affected by a ghost. He went on a pilgrimage but nowhere did he find a cure. When he came to the present-day Varkala, he saw the remnants of the dilapidated temple beside the sea and prayed to the deity, saying he would rebuild the temple there. A dream told him that he should go to the seashore and near the temple the following day. Nearby he would see a huge mass of flowers floating in the sea, and if he searched there, he would find an idol. He was instructed to make a golden hand and attach it to the idol and build a temple around it. The present Janardana idol was recovered from the sea by him. He built the temple and laid down the rules for the maintenance of the temple. The idol of Janardana has an abhojana in its right hand.

People believe that over years this hand is rising slowly. The day the idol can eat the abhojana from his right hand, the world will face the great deluge. The idol is always dressed in sandals and flowers, either in the form of Janardana, Narasimha, Venugopala, or Mohini. Ashtami Rohini, the birthday of Krishna in the month of Chingam (August–September), is celebrated as a festival here.

=== Rituals ===
Offering obeisances to the departed souls and forefathers is an important ritual at the temple. Four poojas are conducted each day. The temple's chief priest is a Tulu Brahmin, who should not be a native of the place where the temple exists.

People believe that ancestors worshipped in this temple will be pleased. Possibly because of this, the Janardana is also called 'Pitru Mokshakan'.

The temple is also an important Ayurveda treatment center.

== Festivals ==
Every year, in the Malayalam month of Meenam (March–April), a ten-day Arattu festival is celebrated at the Janardanaswamy Temple in Kerala's beach town of Varkala. The festival starts with a Kodiyettam flag hoisting ceremony, and ends with a procession of five decorated elephants through the streets. During the fourth and fifth days of the festival, the celebrations include all-night performances such as traditional Kathakali dancing. The arattu (holy bath) of the deity is conducted on Uttaram day in the Arabian Sea behind the temple.

Apart from this festival, the days of the appearance of Vishnu's avatars (e.g.: Rama Navami, Ashtami Rohini, Narasimha Jayanti), Karkidaka vavu (Amavasya day in the month of Karkidakam, which comes in July or August), and Vaikuntha Ekadashi are also celebrated in the temple. The days of Thiruvonam star, Ekadashi, and Thursdays are also considered important, since according to popular custom, these days are dedicated to Vishnu.

== See also ==
- List of Hindu temples in Kerala
- Temples of Kerala
