= Oorali Appooppan Kavu =

Ancient temple in Kerala, India

Sree Kalleli Oorali Appooppan Kavu
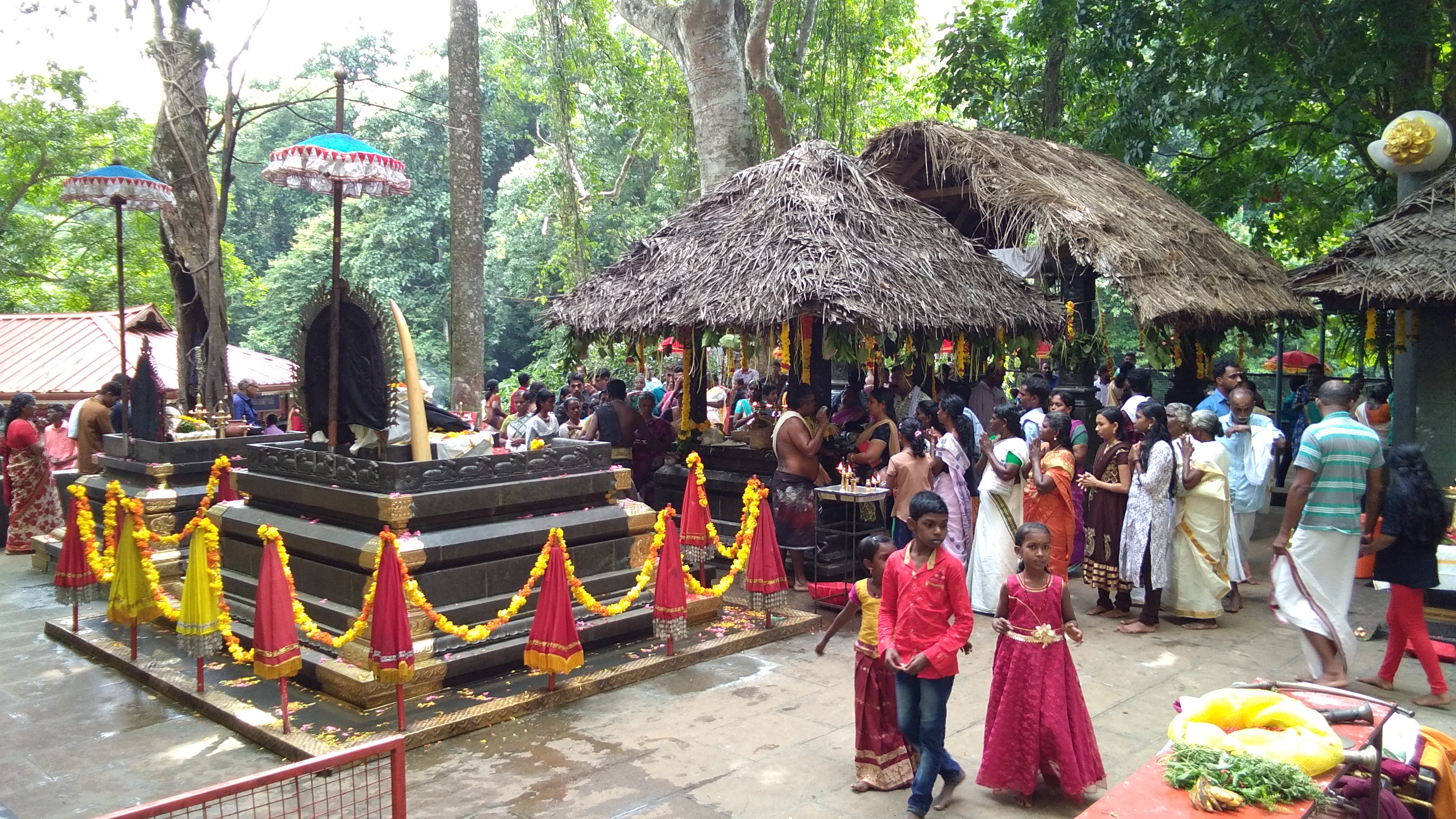
- Devotees at the temple

- Location in Kerala Oorali Appooppan Kavu (India)

Religion
- Affiliation: Hinduism
- District: Pathanamthitta
- Deity: Oorali Appooppan
- Festival: Pathamudaya Mahotsavam
- Governing body: Sree Kalleli Oorali Appooppan Kavu Samrakshana Samathi

Location
- Location: Kalleli
- State: Kerala
- Country: India
- Interactive map of Sree Kalleli Oorali Appooppan Kavu
- Coordinates: 9°11′34″N 76°54′12″E

Architecture
- Type: Dravidian architecture
- Elevation: 173 m (568 ft)

Website
- Official website

The Oorali Appooppan Kavu is an ancient temple located on the banks of the Achankovil River in Kalleli in the Pathanamthitta district of Kerala, India. The temple is situated on the Kalleli–Achankovil forest route, 19 km (12 mi) from the district headquarters in Pathanamthitta and 9 km (5.6 mi) from Konni. The presiding deity of the temple is Oorali Appooppan, who is considered the lord of mountain gods. The main festival of the temple is Pathamudayam, commencing on Vishu in the month of mēṭam in the Malayalam calendar.

== Tradition ==
The temple follows the traditions and rituals of early Dravida–Naga tribes and is entirely different from the traditional tantric procedures and poojas held in regular Hindu temples.

== Deities ==
The main deities of the temple are Oorali Appooppan or Kalleli Appooppan and Oorali Ammoomma. Appooppan is considered as the lord of 999 Mala Daivangal (mountain gods) and Ammoomma is considered to be his mother.

The subordinate deities of the temple include Vadakkenchery Valyachan, Ganesha, Parashakti, Yakshiamma, Nagaraja, Nagayakshi, Raktharakshas, Kuttichathan, Kochukunju Arukala, Bharatha Poonkuravan, Bharatha Poonkurathi and Harinarayana Thampuran.

== Festivals ==
The main festival or Utsavam is the Pathamudaya Mahotsavam held in the Malayalam month of mēṭam (April–May). The 10-day festival begins on Vishu and ends on Pathamudayam (10th sunrise after Vishu) with different pujas and rituals like Aditya Pongala. Another special occasion is the Mandala–Makaravilakku festival, held from the Malayalam month of vr̥ścikam to makaram (mid-November to mid-January).

== Rituals ==
Karkidaka Vavu Bali is one of the important rituals performed in the temple during the Malayalam month of kaṟkkiṭakam (July–August). Other important rituals are Aanayoottu (elephant feeding), Vanarayoottu (monkey feeding) and Meenoottu (fish feeding).

The traditional arts of the Dravida–Naga tribes such as Kumbhapattu, Bharathakkali, Thalayattam Kali, Vellamkudi Nivedyam, Aazhi Puja and Kalleli Vilakku are unique to the temple. Ritualistic arts like Padayani and Mudi-āttam are also performed on special occasions.

== See also ==
- List of Hindu temples in Kerala
