= Golden Island =

Golden Island may refer to:

- An early name for the Golden Chersonese, the Malay peninsula
- Golden Island Shopping Centre, a shopping center in Ireland
- An island in Whidbey Isles Conservation Park, South Australia
- A former name of Nijhum Dwip, Hatiya, Bangladesh
- An alternate name for Ponnumthuruthu, Kerala, India
- The main setting of the video game Angry Birds Stella
- A brand of beef jerky acquired by Jack Link's Beef Jerky
- The Portuguese island Porto Santo
- The Croatian island Šipan

== See also ==
- Goldenisland
