= East-West Airlines =

East-West Airlines may refer to:

- East-West Airlines (Australia)
- East-West Airlines (India)
