= Karkidaka vavu =

Set of Hindu rituals

Karkidaka Vavu (Malayalam: കർക്കിടക വാവ്), also known as Karkidaka Vavu Bali or Vavu Bali, is a set of Hindu rituals performed annually during the Karkidakam month in the state of Kerala, India, to honor deceased ancestors.

On the day of Amavasya (new moon), people gather at riverbanks, beaches, or temple ghats at dawn, dressed simply and carrying natural offerings like cooked rice balls, sesame seeds, tulsi leaves, and coconuts. This ritual, known as Bali Tharpanam, is believed to help departed souls attain moksha (liberation), while also offering spiritual strength and blessings to the living.

Major ritual sites include riverbanks such as the Pamba, temple tanks in villages, and beaches like Papanasham Beach in Varkala, which becomes a prominent spiritual hub during the day. There is also a belief that doing the ritual at home is the most sacred offering.

== Rituals and Significance ==
The word "Bali" here refers to offering, not sacrifice. The ritual centers around performing symbolic gestures using pindam (rice balls), sesame, and sacred water, led by priests. These items are offered with prayers and immersed into flowing waters. The rituals are deeply tied to nature, traditionally conducted outdoors amidst Kerala's monsoon season.

The month of Karkidakam is historically seen as a difficult time, marked by heavy rains, farming challenges, and illness. Performing bali during this period is both a remembrance and a plea for protection. Many see the act as more than religious—it is an emotional connection with lineage, land, and a larger cosmic rhythm.

== Ecological and Cultural Aspects ==
Karkidaka Vavu rituals are noted for being naturally eco-friendly. All items used are biodegradable and seasonally sourced—nothing synthetic is involved. The ritual is performed without fanfare or excess, often barefoot in nature, reinforcing a message of humility and ecological balance.

Climate change has started impacting the performance of the rituals. In recent years, floods and coastal erosion have altered or damaged traditional ritual sites, making it difficult for people to perform the bali in their ancestral locations. Nonetheless, community resilience remains strong, with collective efforts emerging to protect these sacred spaces.

== Cultural Reflection ==
Karkidaka Vavu Bali is not just a spiritual ritual but a time of quiet reflection—on the past, the challenges of the present, and hopes for the future. It is deeply rooted in Kerala's cultural identity and remains relevant even in modern times for its simplicity, environmental respect, and emotional resonance.
