= Thakiyudeen Abdul Wahid =

Indian entrepreneur and aviator

- Born: December 28, 1952; Varkala, Trivandrum, India
- Died: November 13, 1995 (aged 42); Mumbai
- Cause of death: Murder
- Occupations: Entrepreneur; Aviator
- Known for: founding the East-West Airlines

Thakiyudeen Abdul Wahid was an Indian entrepreneur and aviator. He was the Founder and Managing Director of the now-defunct East-West Airlines, the first scheduled private airline in the country. He was murdered on 13 November 1995.

== Early life ==
Wahid was born in Varkala of Trivandrum district in Kerala on 28 December 1952. He had a modest educational background and studied till 9th grade. His father Abdul Wahid Musliar was a dried fish merchant and mother Salma Beevi a house wife.

He was a drop out from Sree Narayana College Kollam and began his Pravasi life through association with Ahmed Mansoor Al Aali (AMA Group) of Bahrain. He started a recruitment agency in 1980's for this entity in Bombay.

== Career ==
He began his business career with a travel agency with his brothers in Dadar, Mumbai to recruit manpower to Gulf countries. He started East-West Airlines in 1992 when the Indian Government reformed the airline industry by its "open skies policy". East-West Airlines commenced commercial operations on 28 February 1992.

The airline shut down its operations in 1996 after his death in 1995.

== Death ==
Wahid was shot dead on 13 November 1995 near his office in Mumbai.
