= Edavai railway station =

Railway station in Kerala, India

Edava

General information
- Location: Edava, Varkala, Trivandrum; India
- Coordinates: 8.741°N 76.723°E
- Elevation: 57 m (187 ft)
- System: Regional rail and Light rail station
- Owner: Indian Railways
- Operator: Southern Railway
- Line: Kollam–Thiruvananthapuram line
- Platforms: 2
- Tracks: 2

Construction
- Structure type: Standard (on ground station)
- Parking: Yes

Other information
- Status: Functioning
- Station code: EVA
- Zone(s): Southern Railway zone
- Division(s): Thiruvananthapuram

History
- Opened: 1952; 74 years ago
- Electrified: 25 kV AC 50 Hz
- Former names: Edava Railway Station

Passengers
- 2018–19: 194210 (532/day)
Route map
Location
- Location within Kerala Location within India

Edava railway station (station code: EVA) is an NSG–6 category Indian railway station in Thiruvananthapuram railway division of Southern Railway zone. It is one of the four railway stations serving the Varkala urban agglomeration in district of Trivandrum, Kerala. It is situated in Edava panchayat of Varkala Taluk. Edava is the 14th most revenue-generating railway station in Trivandrum district. In the 2018–19 fiscal year, Edava generated ₹11lakh profit from 1.94 lakh passengers.
