= Varkala Beach =

Beach in Trivandrum, Kerala, India

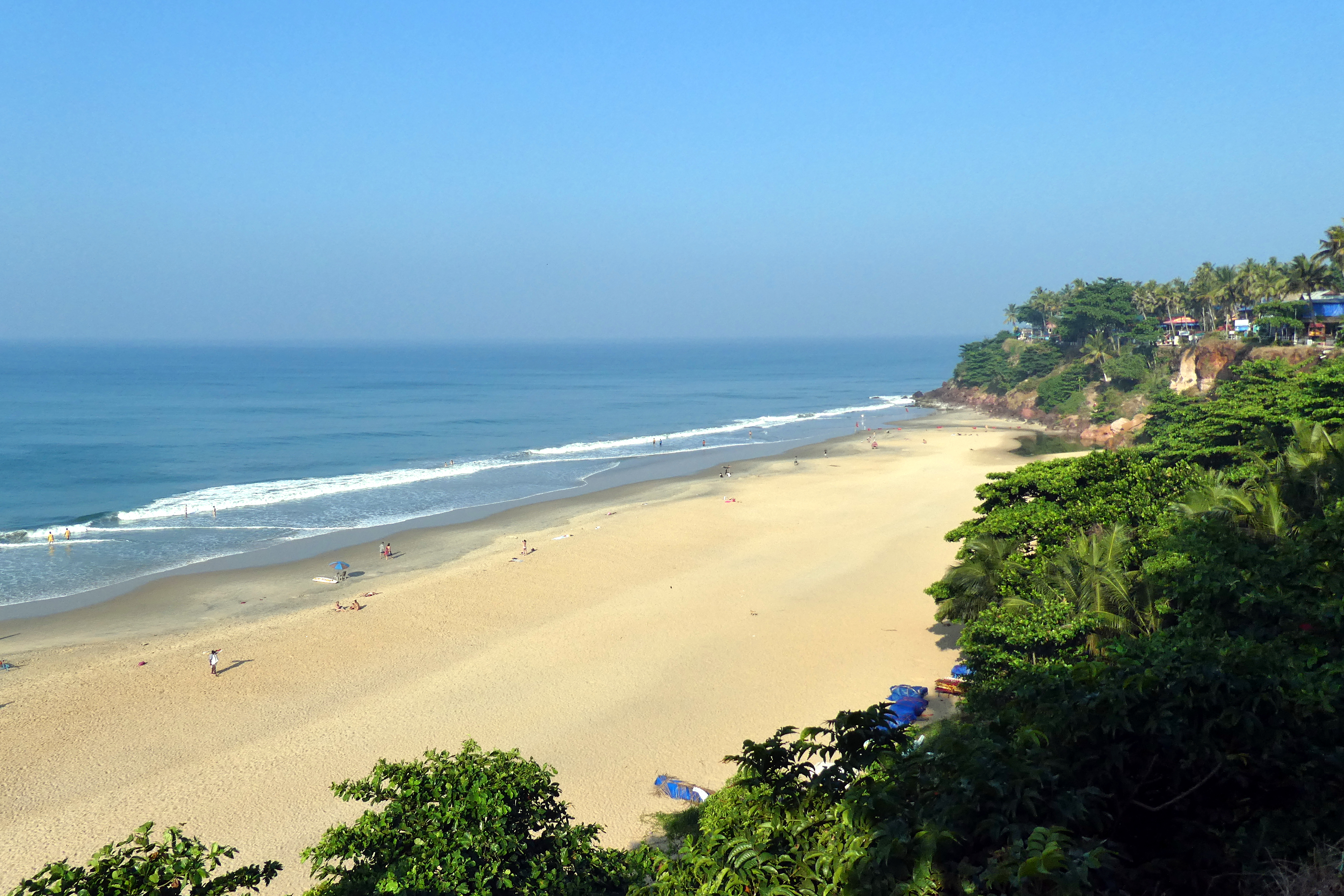
Varkala Beach

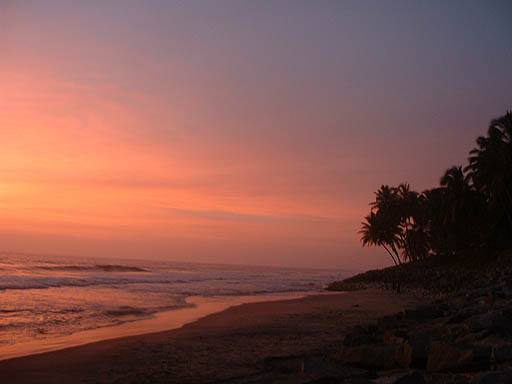
Sunset at Varkala Beach

Varkala Beach is situated in the town of Varkala in Varkala Municipality, Thiruvananthapuram district, Kerala, India. The beach skirts the Arabian Sea, part of the Indian Ocean.

== Geography ==
Varkala is located at 8.73°N 76.71°E.

== Culture ==
The Janardana Swami Temple is known for a ten-day festival held twice a year, called Arattu.

== Activities ==
Varkala Beach has adventure and leisure activities such as boat riding, parasailing, jet skiing, and horse-riding. There are also restaurants and cafes; alcohol is not served.

== Landmarks ==
Varkala beach is the only place in southern Kerala where cliffs are found adjacent to the Arabian Sea.

== Transport ==
Train service is available at Varkala Sivagiri Railway Station. The nearest airport is Thiruvananthapuram International Airport.

== Gallery ==
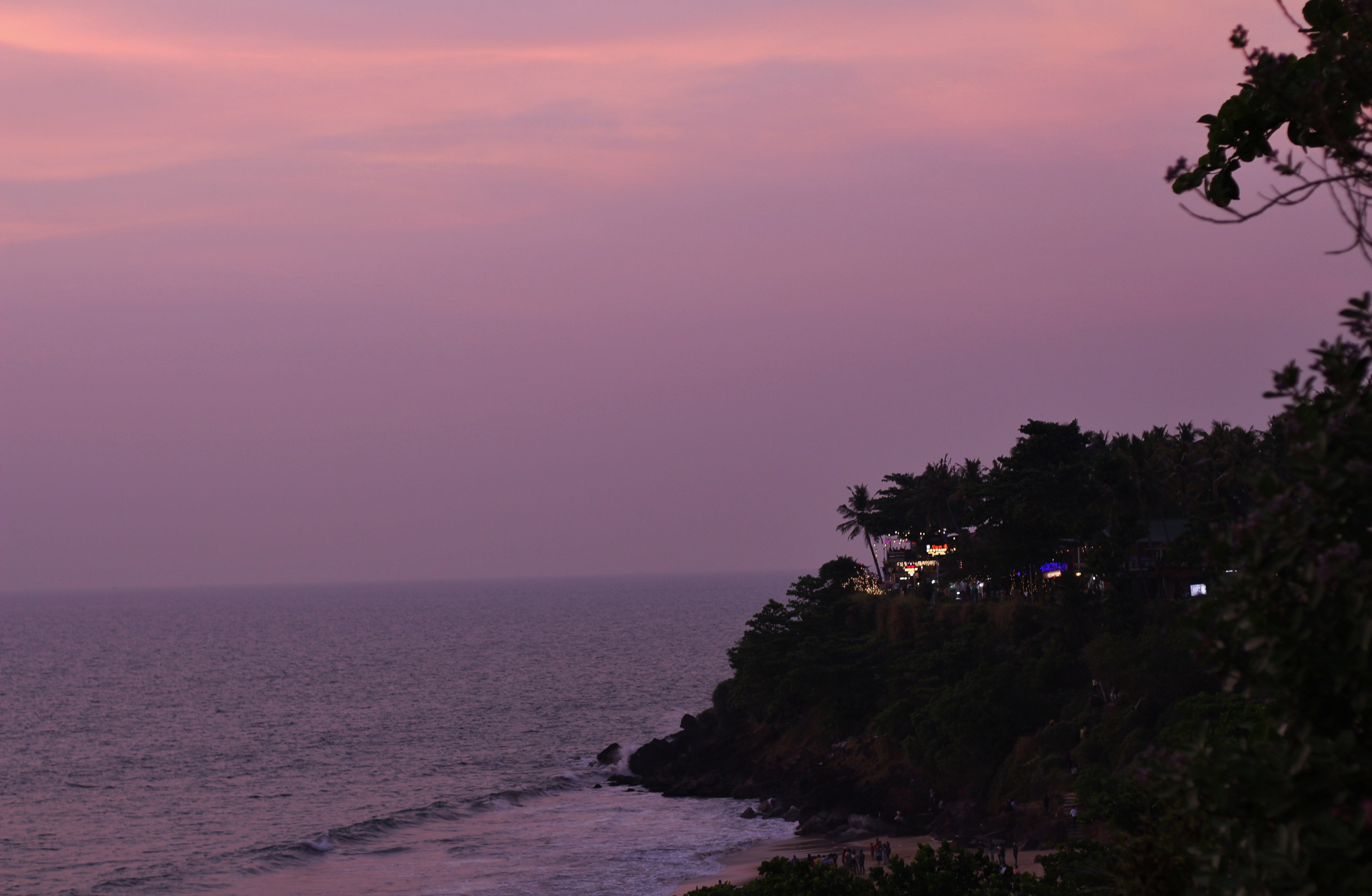
Varkala beach

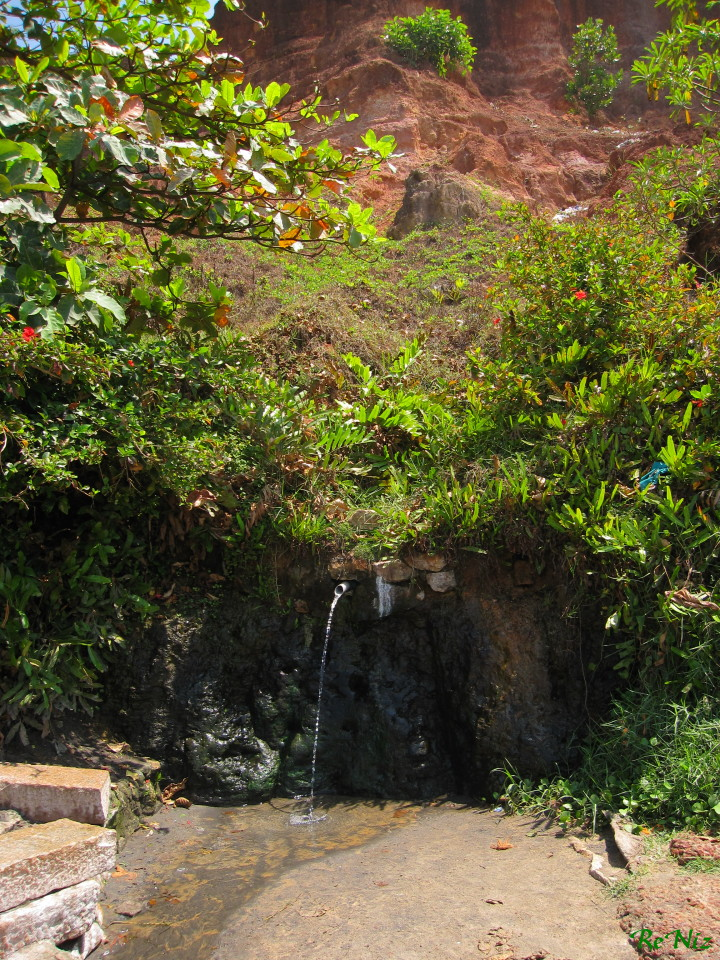
A natural water spout in Varkala Beach

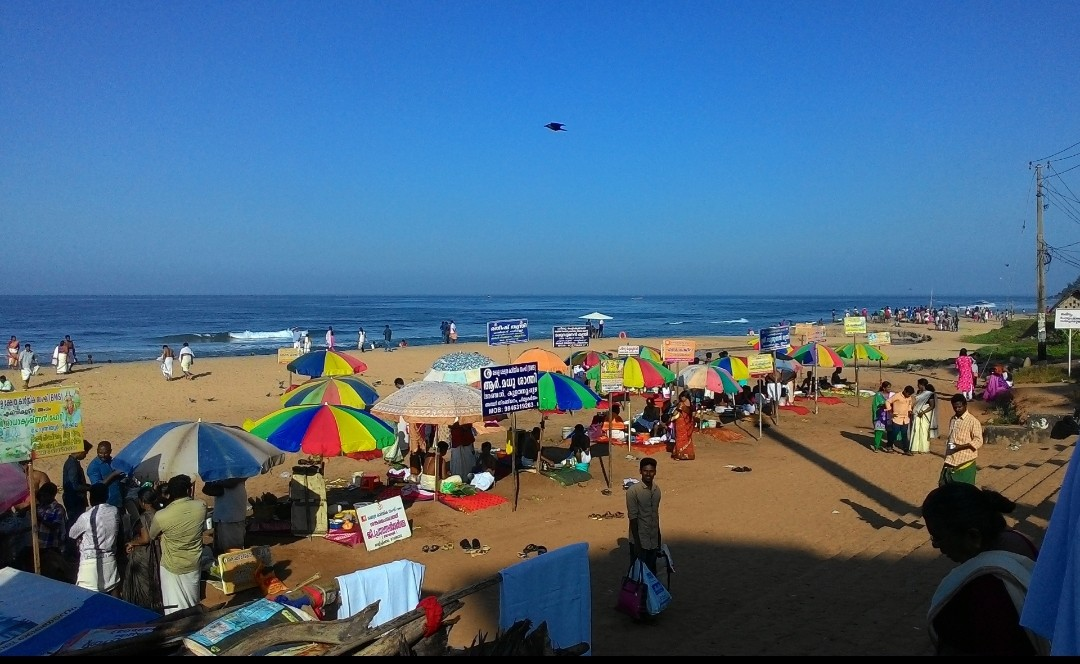
Karkidaka Vavu Bali ritual being performed at Varkala Beach

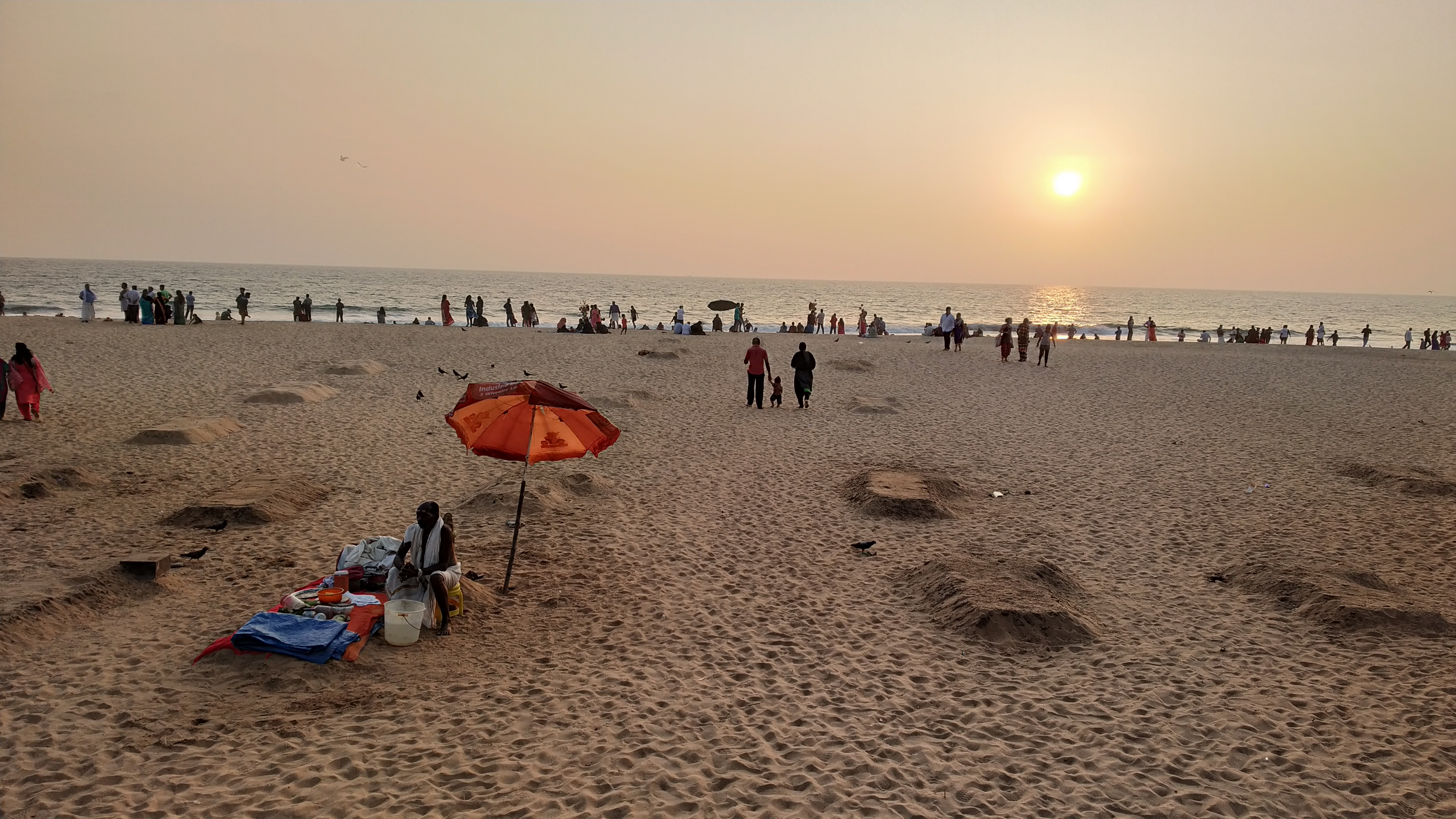
Evening at Varkala beach
