= East-West Airlines (India) =

Indian private airline

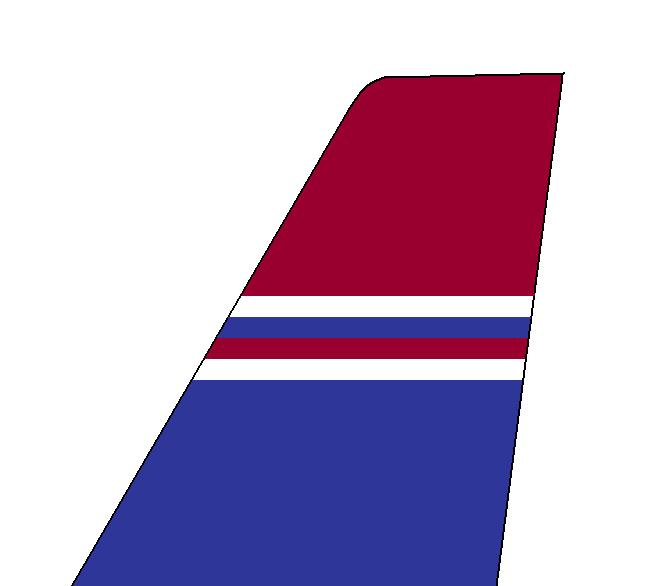
- Tail colours of an East-West Airlines Boeing 737
- Founded: 1991; 35 years ago
- Commenced operations: 1992; 34 years ago
- Ceased operations: August 8, 1996; 30 years ago
- Destinations: Trivandrum; Mumbai; Delhi, Chennai, Visakhapatnam, Bangalore etc
- Headquarters: Mumbai
- Key people: Thakiyudeen Abdul Wahid (managing director)

East-West Airlines was a private airline company based in Mumbai, India that operated during the 1990s on trunk linkage airports across India.

== History ==
=== Commencement of operations ===
In 1990-91 the entry of private airlines began, after the de-regulation of the Indian Civil Aviation sector. Private airlines were given permission to operate charter and non-scheduled services under the ‘Air Taxi’ Scheme. East West Airlines, head-quartered in Trivandrum was the first national level private airline in India to operate after almost 37 years.

East West Airlines was promoted by Thakiyudeen Abdul Wahid, a native from Varkala Trivandrum district. The airline began operations in early 1992 when the Indian Government reformed the industry by its "open skies policy" that gave rise to numerous private air charter operators that serviced India. The airline established offices in Trivandrum in 1995, New Delhi, Madras (now named Chennai) and Mumbai.

It started, as per government stipulations, with three aircraft, all Boeing 737-200s. In 1992, to counter the impact of a crippling Indian Airlines pilot strike, the then-Civil Aviation minister, Madhavrao Scindia asked the airline to bring in more aircraft. East West went on to acquire four more, taking its count to seven Boeing 737s.

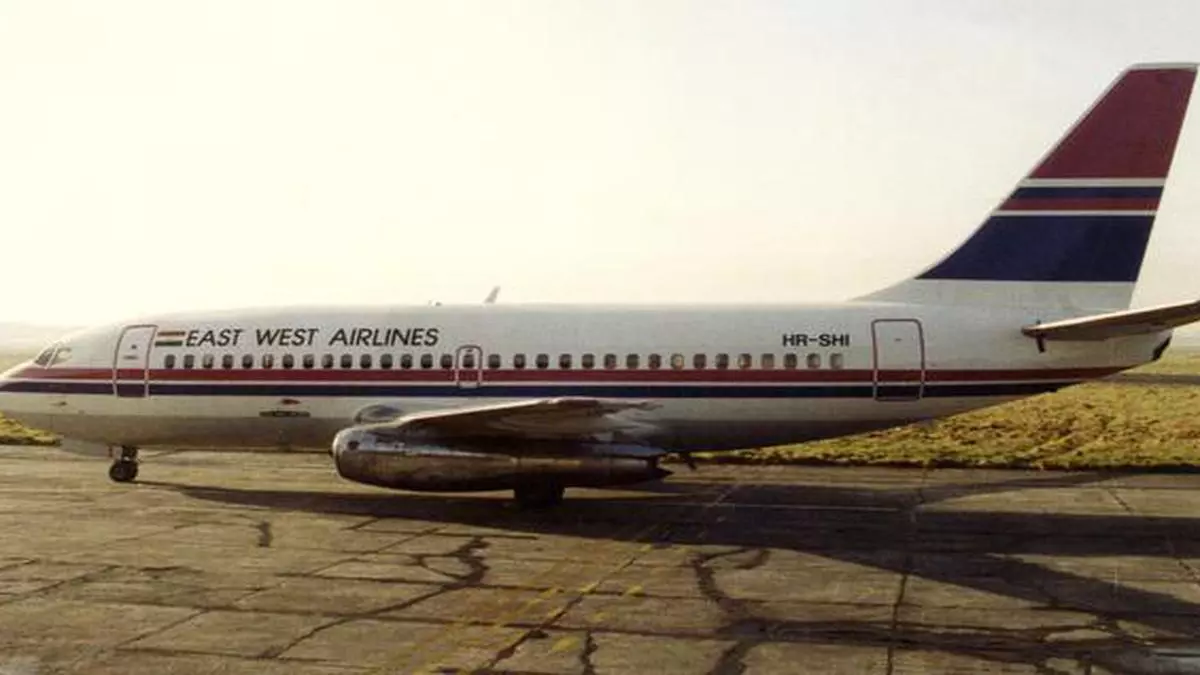
An East West Airlines Boeing 737-200 passenger aircraft parked. (Circa 1994) PHOTO: THE HINDU ARCHIVES

The Indian Government granted scheduled domestic airline status to nine private air charter operators, including East West, in 1994.

=== Downfall ===
On 13 November 1995 the company's managing director Thakiyudeen Wahid was shot dead near his Mumbai office. The airline owed 3.3 million dollars to PLM Equipment - an American company from which it had leased three Boeings. PLM Equipment first appealed to the Directorate General of Civil Aviation (DGCA) to deregister the aircraft and then went to court. The Delhi high court ordered East West to pay up or return the aircraft. The three aircraft were then grounded.

In May 1996 the airline sought and was given DGCA permission to stop flying trunk routes due to a shortage of aircraft. By June 1996 it had decided to fly only from Mumbai to non-trunk destinations such as Calicut, Trivandrum and Cochin.

Finally, on 8 August 1996, East West Airlines ceased all operations.

== Destinations ==
India

- Trivandrum (Trivandrum International Airport)
- Ahmedabad (Sardar Vallabhbhai Patel International Airport)
- Kolkata (Netaji Subhas Chandra Bose International Airport)
- Mumbai (Chhatrapati Shivaji Maharaj International Airport)
- Bangalore (Bangalore Airport)
- Belgaum (Belgaum Airport)
- Mangalore (Mangalore Airport)
- New Delhi (New Delhi Airport)
- Goa (Goa Airport)
- Chennai (Chennai Airport)
- Madurai (Madurai Airport)
- Visakhapatnam

== Fleet ==
East West operated a total fleet of eleven aircraft, comprising eight leased Boeing 737-200s and three Fokker F27s. After the airline shut down operations, the Boeings were returned to their lessors; while two Fokkers were stored at Mumbai Airport until 2006, when they were auctioned off by AAI to recover some of the fees it was owed by way of parking and landing charges.

== Accidents and incidents ==
On 1 July 1995, an East West Airlines Fokker F27, registered VT-EWE, was engaged in a touch-and-go landing training exercise at Vadodara Airport when the aircraft's left main landing gear failed on touchdown. The aircraft continued moving forward on its belly and skid to a halt on the runway. There was no fire and no injury to persons on board the aircraft. Poor maintenance was cited as a contributory factor in the accident. The aircraft was written off.
