= Varkala Municipality =

Municipal council in Kerala, India

Type
- Type: Municipality

Leadership
- Chairperson: Geetha Hemachandran, CPI(M)
- Leader Of Opposition: TBA, BJP

Structure
- Seats: 34
- Political groups: Government (16) LDF (16): CPI(M) (16); Official Opposition (10); NDA (10): BJP (10); Other Opposition (6); UDF (6): INC (6); Other (2): IND (2)

Elections
- Last election: December 2025
- Next election: December 2030

Website
- www.varkalamunicipality.in

Varkala Municipality is the municipal council that manages a portion of the city of Varkala in Kerala state in India. The Municipality manages the 14.5 km^{2} area of city of Varkala and has a population of 40,048 in that area. It is the most densely populated municipality in the state capital district Thiruvananthapuram .

== Current members ==
Chairperson: TBA
Ward Details		Councillor	Party	Alliance	Remarks
No.	Name	Councillor	Party	Alliance	Remarks
1	Vilakkulam	Fahad H.	Communist Party of India (Marxist)	LDF	
2	Idapparambu	Siji	Communist Party of India (Marxist)	LDF	
3	Janathamukku	Ninumol Roy	Communist Party of India (Marxist)	LDF	
4	Karunilakode	Sajith Royi	Communist Party of India (Marxist)	LDF	
5	Kallazhi	Seetha Santosh	Communist Party of India (Marxist)	LDF	
6	Pullannikode	Dr.Indulekha C. U.	Indian National Congress	UDF	
7	Ayanikkuzhivila	G. P. Vijayakumari	Bharatiya Janata Party	NDA	
8	Kannamba	Priya Gopan	Bharatiya Janata Party	NDA	
9	Nadayara	Y. Shahjahan	Independent	None	
10	Kanwasramam	P. J. Naisam	Indian National Congress	UDF	
11	Chaluvila	B. Praveen	Communist Party of India (Marxist)	LDF	
12	Kallamkonam	Saji B.	Communist Party of India (Marxist)	LDF	
13	Cherukunnam	Mary (Lilly)	Communist Party of India (Marxist)	LDF	
14	Sivagiri	S. Prasannan	Communist Party of India (Marxist)	LDF	
15	Teachers Colony	Rakhi R.	Bharatiya Janata Party	NDA	
16	Raghunathapuram	A. Kabeer	Indian National Congress	UDF	
17	Puthenchantha	Shahjahan M. I.	Communist Party of India (Marxist)	LDF	
18	Thachankonam	Sheena K. Govind	Bharatiya Janata Party	NDA	
19	Ramanthali	Prasad S.	Independent	None	
20	Panayil	Sumaiya	Indian National Congress	UDF	
21	Vallakkadavu	Ajayan S.	Communist Party of India (Marxist)	LDF	
22	Perumkulam	Sheeba Vijayakumar	Bharatiya Janata Party	NDA	
23	Kottumoola	Prameela	Indian National Congress	UDF	
24	Maithanam	Sajitha Manikandan	Communist Party of India (Marxist)	LDF	
25	Municipal Office	Premkumari S.	Bharatiya Janata Party	NDA	
26	Hospital	Rama K.	Bharatiya Janata Party	NDA	
27	Temple	Adv.R. Anilkumar	Bharatiya Janata Party	NDA	
28	Janardhanapuram	Ranju Binu	Communist Party of India (Marxist)	LDF	
29	Mundayil	B. Sunilkumar	Communist Party of India (Marxist)	LDF	
30	Jawahar Park	Priyanka Raj	Bharatiya Janata Party	NDA	
31	Punnamoodu	A. R. Anish	Bharatiya Janata Party	NDA	
32	Parayil	Ragashree	Indian National Congress	UDF	
33	Papanasam	Geetha Hemachandra n.	Communist Party of India (Marxist)	LDF	
34	Kurakkanni	Akhila G. S.	Communist Party of India (Marxist)	LDF	

== Statistics ==
Statistics
District	Thiruvananthapuram
Taluk	Varkala
Area	14.87km²
Wards	33
Population	40,048
Male	18,312
Female	21,736
Population density	2700
Sex ratio	1026
Literacy rate	93.57%
Literacy (male)	95.43%
Literacy (Female)	92.04%
