= Ponnumthuruthu =

Island in Varkala, Trivandrum

Golden Island Varkala
- Island
- Ponnumthuruthu (Golden Island, Varkala)
- Nickname: Golden Island
- Location in Kerala, India Golden Island Varkala (India)
- Coordinates: 8.69886°N 76.7470°E
- Town Country: India
- State: Kerala
- District: Thiruvananthapuram
- Founded by: Valyapurakkal Family Trust

Government
  - Type: Local Self Government
  - Body: Panchayat

Area
  - Total: 5 km^{2} (1.9 sq mi)

Languages
  - Official: Malayalam, English
- Time zone: UTC+5:30 (IST)
- Telephone code: 0470
- Vehicle registration: KL-16
- Thiruvananthapuram: Varkala
- Lok Sabha constituency: Attingal
- Vidhan Sabha constituency: Attingal
- Website: https://golden-island.business.site/

Ponnumthuruthu also known as Golden Island is an island in Varkala of Trivandrum district in Kerala.It is located between 'Panayilkadavu, Vakkom, Attingal'and 'Panayilkadavu, Vennicode, Varkala'.It is situated in Anjuthengu lake or called Panayilkadavu lake.The island is a property of the Valiyapurakkal Family. The island also contain a Hindu temple that is 100 years old. Sivarathri festival, Sivarathri is a major festival celebrated at the Siva Parvathi Vishnu temple at Ponnumthuruthu. It is the festival that makes alive the otherwise less frequented island. Many devotees spend the night on the island during Sivarathri and the place lit with lights is an enchanting sight.
