= Kappil, Alappuzha =

Kappil
- village
- Location in Kerala, India Kappil (India)
- Coordinates: 9°10′0″N 76°31′0″E
- Country: India
- State: Kerala
- District: Alappuzha

Languages
  - Official: Malayalam, English
- Time zone: UTC+5:30 (IST)
- PIN: 690533
- Telephone code: 0479
- Vehicle registration: KL-29
- Literacy: 95%

Kappil is a small village in Alappuzha district of Kerala state, India.

== Location ==
Kappil is located near the famous Oachira Temple. It is located in the district of Alapuzha in Kerala, which is the southern state of India. It is mainly divided as Kappil East and Kappil West. Kattachira, Choonadu etc. are some of the nearest places. The nearest town is Kayamkulam which is only 5 km away.
The residents speak Malayalam with a central travancore accent.

== Education ==
This village has a literacy rate of above 95%.

- NNMUPS or Alummoottil School,
- C.M.S.L.P School,
- Govt LP School,
- Vishawabharathi High School

== Places of worship ==
- St. Paul's CSI Church, Kappil;
- St. Thomas Mar Thoma Church
- Vayalil Temple, Thumpilil Temple, kurakkavu temple, kalathil temple, Kuttiyil temple, Pachamkulath temple (chakkulathu temple), Chirakkalkutti temple, Vethalan Kavu Mahadeva Temple are the famous temples.
- Kattachira Muslim jama'ath
- Kappil Mekku Muslim Jamath

At kappil East there is a "Sarvamatha sauhardha sangham" doing kettukazcha for Ochira temple this is a secular committee and its president is from Muslim community.

== Plantation Research ==
CPCRI or Central Plantation Crop Research Institute is a central government research facility located on the National Highway - 47 NH-47 which is no more than six kilometers from Kappil village.
