= Kappil railway station =

Railway station in Kerala, India

Kappil

General information
- Location: Kappil, Thiruvananthapuram, Kerala; India
- Coordinates: 8.741°N 76.723°E
- Elevation: 18 m (59 ft)
- System: Regional rail and Light rail station
- Owner: Indian Railways
- Operator: Southern Railway
- Line: Kollam–Thiruvananthapuram line
- Platforms: 2
- Tracks: 2

Construction
- Structure type: Standard (on ground station)
- Parking: Yes

Other information
- Status: Functioning
- Station code: KFI
- Zone(s): Southern Railway zone
- Division(s): Thiruvananthapuram

History
- Opened: 1918; 108 years ago
- Rebuilt: 2017
- Electrified: Yes, 25 kV AC 50 Hz 2006; 20 years ago
- Former names: Kappil Railway Station

Passengers
- 2018–19: 15,529 (43/day)
Route map
Location
- Location within Kerala Location within India

Kappil railway station station code KFI, is one of the four railway stations serving the Varkala urban agglomeration in Thiruvananthapuram district of Kerala. It is situated in Edava Panchayat of Varkala Taluk. It is the 20th most revenue-generating railway station in Thiruvananthapuram district.

Kappil Beach and lake is situated close to this railway station is one of the major tourist destinations in Thiruvananthapuram. In 2018–19 FY Kappil generated Rs.1.18 lakh profit from 15,529 passengers.
