= Kappil, Thiruvananthapuram =

Village in Thiruvananthapuram district, Kerala

Kappil
- place
- Location in Kerala, India Kappil (India)
- Coordinates: 8.7809°N 76.6774°E
- Country: India
- State: Kerala
- District: Thiruvananthapuram

Government
  - Body: Edava Panchayat

Area
  - Total: 3 km^{2} (1.2 sq mi)

Languages
  - Official: Malayalam
- Time zone: UTC+5:30 (IST)
- PIN: 695311
- Telephone code: 0471
- Vehicle registration: KL 81
- Nearest city: Kollam
- Niyamasabha constituency: Varkala
- Website: https://trivandrum.nic.in/en/

Kappil is a seashore tourist spot located in Thiruvananthapuram district, Kerala, India. Varkala Sivagiri railway station is the major railway station near Kappil.

== Gallery ==
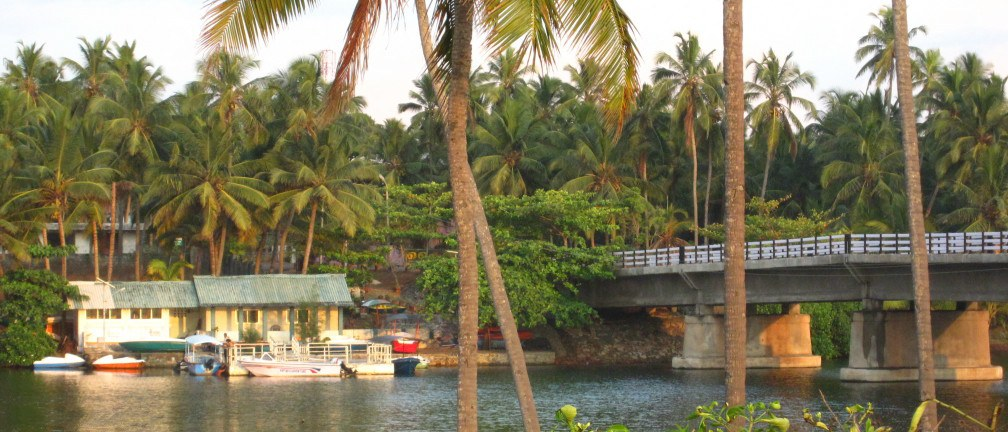
Kappil boatclub

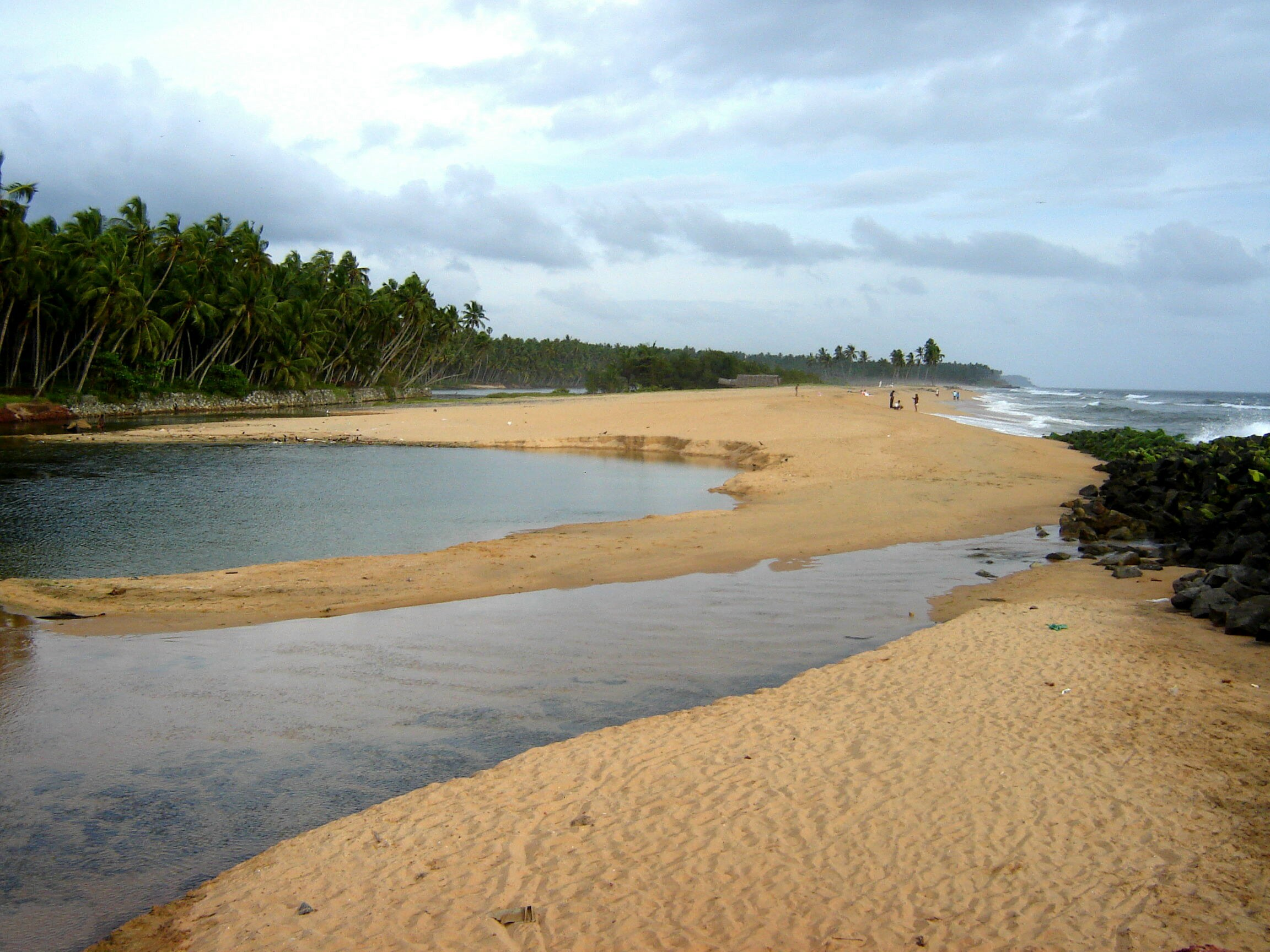
View of the beach

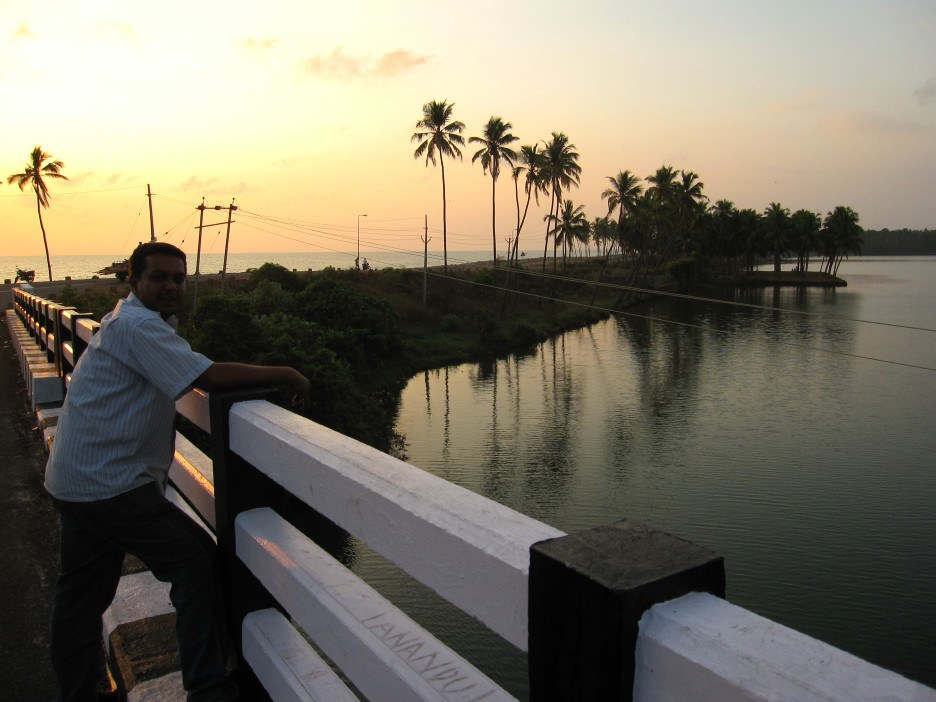
An evening view from Kappil Bridge

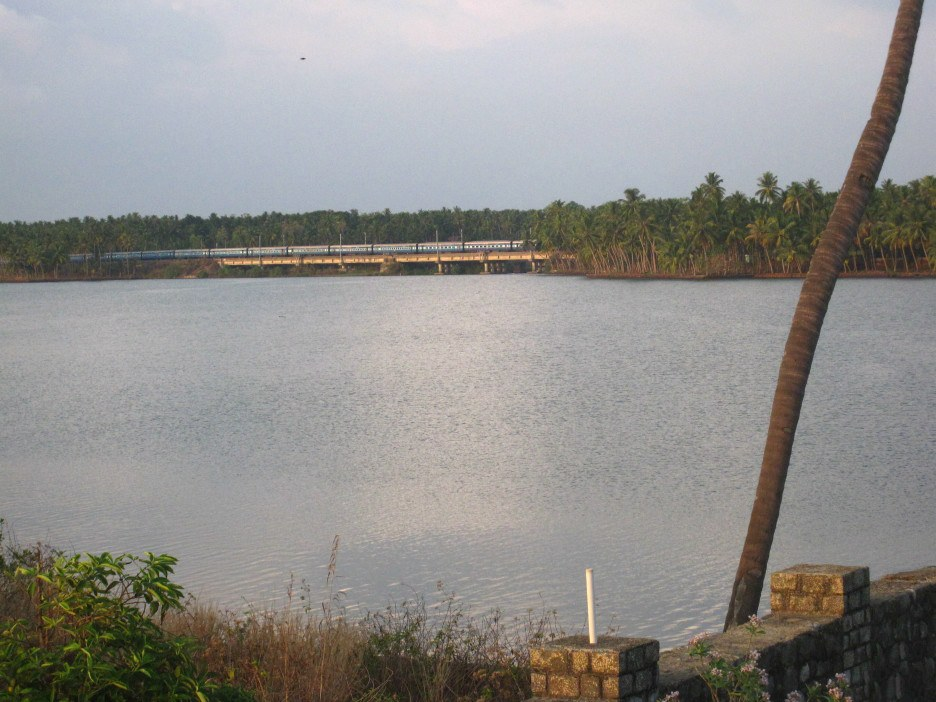
Edava-Nadayara Lake and Kappil Railway Bridge

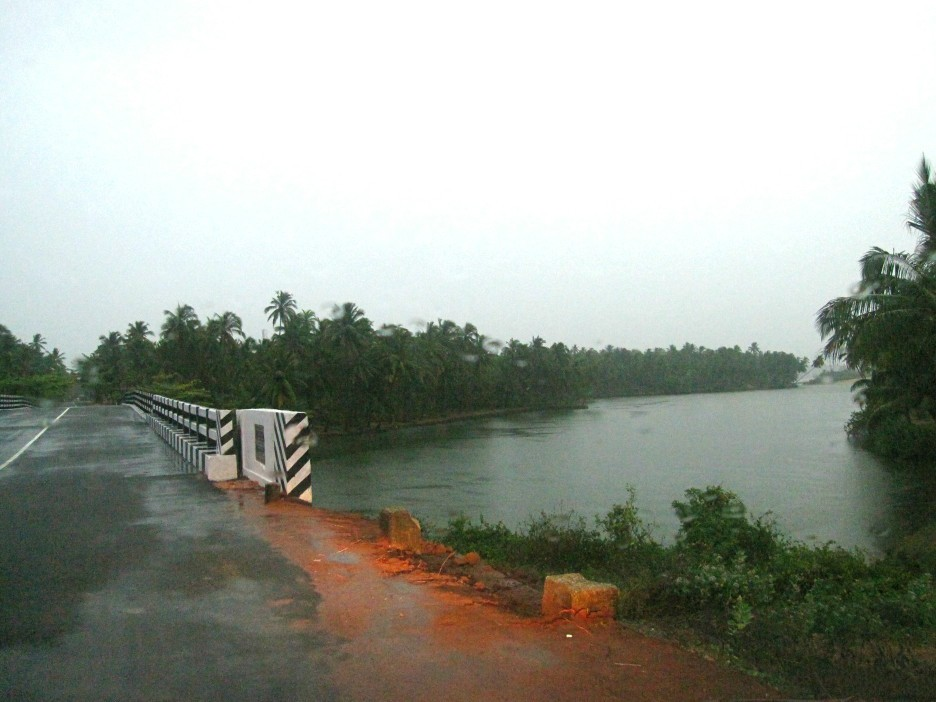
A rainy day

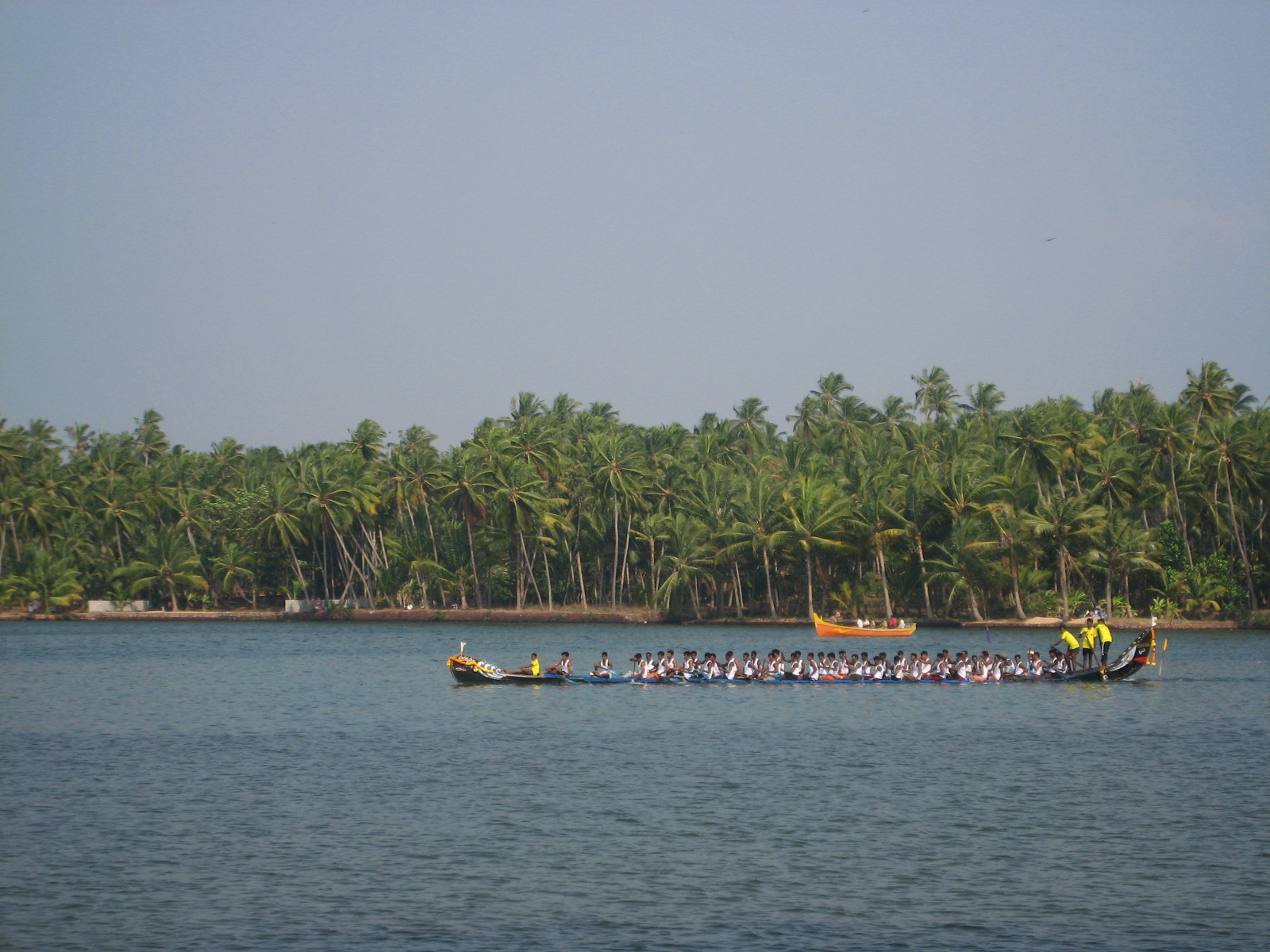
Thekkumbhagam boat race

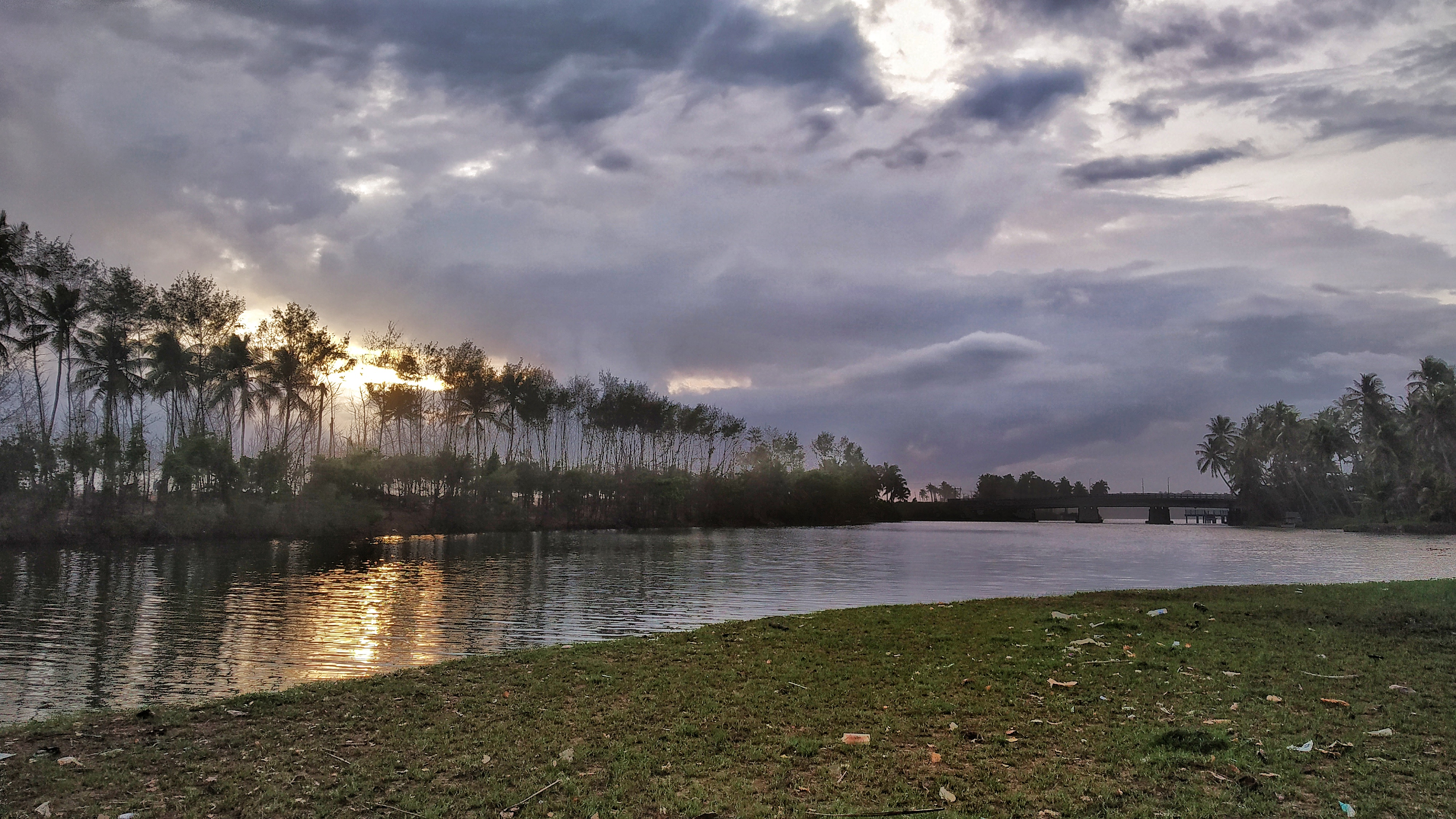
Kappil beach
