= Varkala =

Town in Kerala, India

- Town
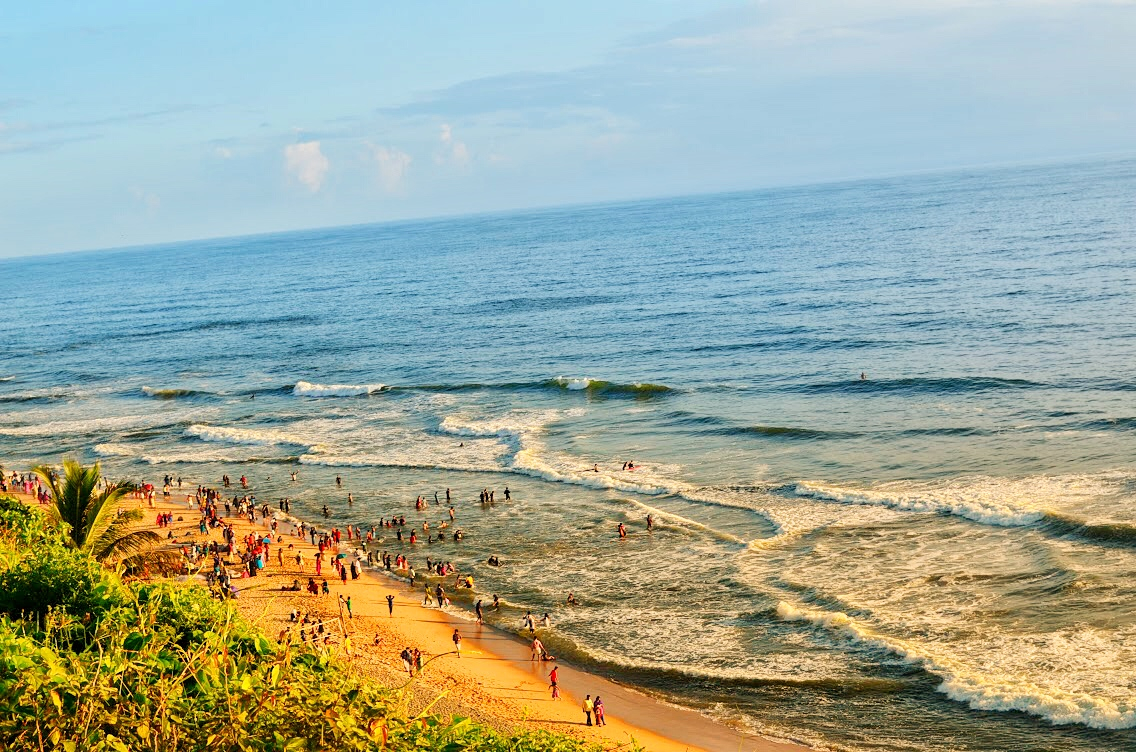
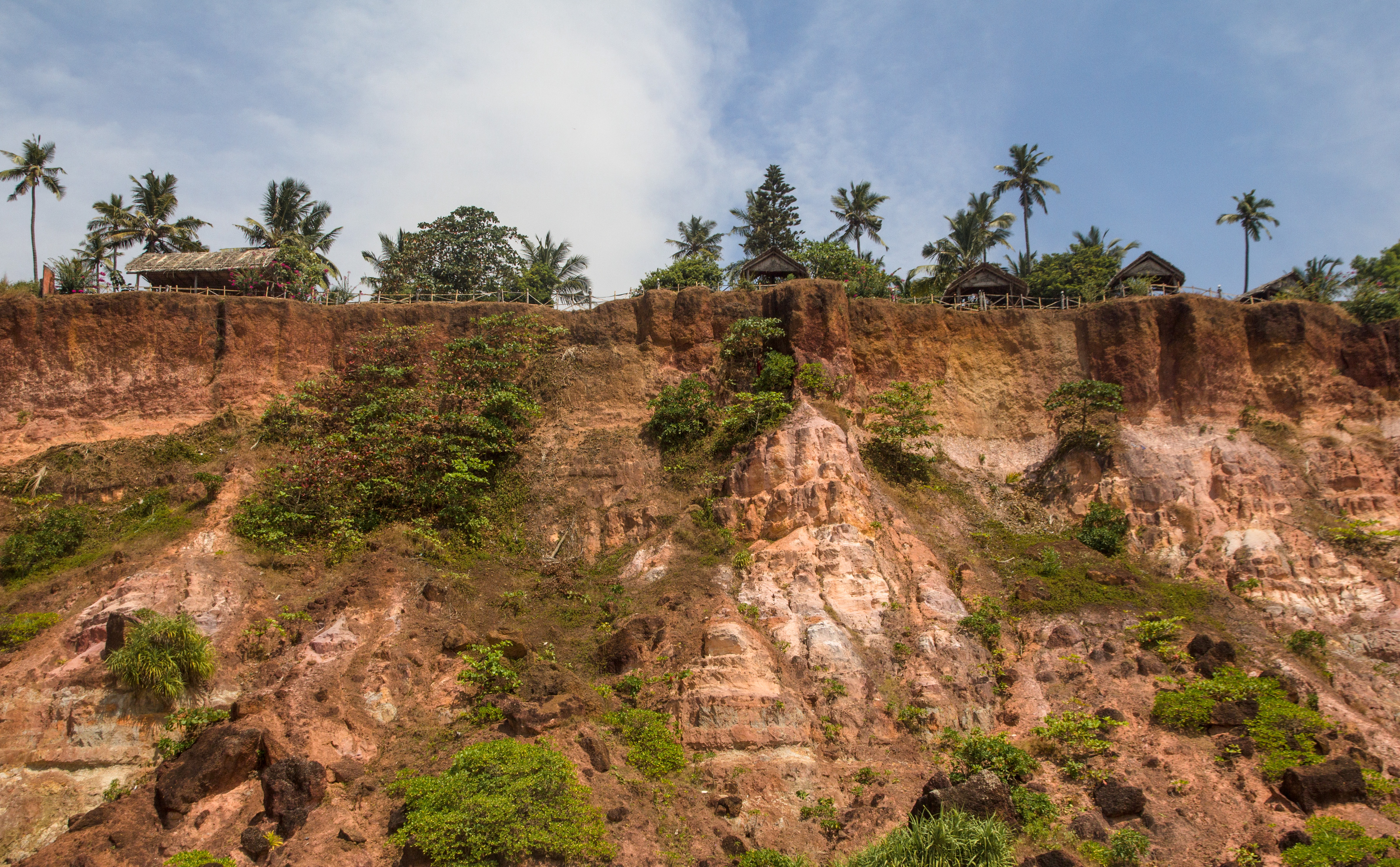
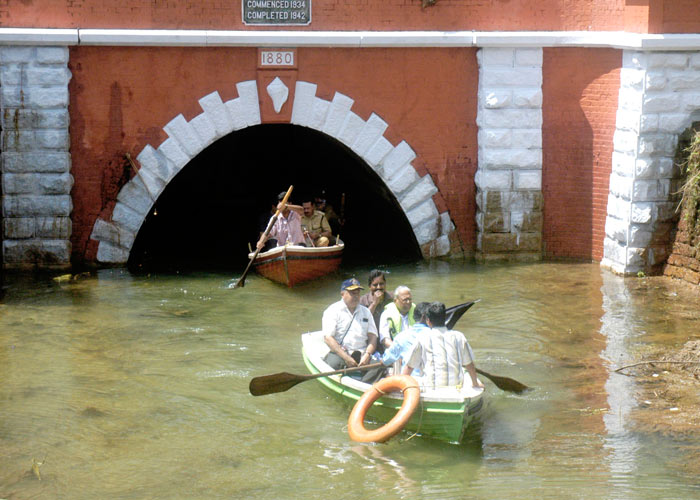
- Varkala Beach Varkala Cliffs Varkala Tunnel

- Location within Kerala Location within India
- Coordinates: 8.7432986°N 76.6968401°E
- Country: India
- State: Kerala
- District: Thiruvananthapuram
- Talukas: Varkala Taluk

Government
  - Type: Municipality
  - Body: Varkala Municipality

Area
  - Total: 15.42 km^{2} (5.95 sq mi)

Population (2011)
  - Total: 40,048
  - Density: 2,597/km^{2} (6,727/sq mi)

Languages
  - Official: Malayalam, English
- Time zone: UTC+5:30 (IST)
- PIN: 695141
- Telephone code: 0470
- Vehicle registration: KL-81
- Website: www.varkalamunicipality.in

National Geological Monuments of India
- Official name: Varkala Cliff Section
- Designated: 2015
- Designated by: Geological Survey of India

Varkala is a town and municipality in Thiruvananthapuram district of the Indian state of Kerala. The Varkala cliff formation found along a 7.5 km (4.7 mi) stretch of the Arabian Sea coast, formed by erosion during the Miocene–Pliocene (23 to 2.58 Ma), has been declared as a National Geological Monument by the Geological Survey of India. The Janardana Swami Temple, dedicated to the Hindu god Vishnu, is located at Varkala.

== Etymology ==
The origin of the name Varkala is attributed to a legend in Hindu mythology. As per this legend, nine Prajapatis visited sage Narada and asked him for an idea to cleanse themselves of their sins. Narada threw a piece of garment made of tree bark known as "valkalam" and asked the Prajapatis to pray at the site where the garment falls on Earth. The location where the garment fell came to be called as "Valkalam" which later became "Varkala".

As per local lore, it is believed that a Pandyan King was instructed by Brahma to build a temple for Vishnu to redeem him of his sins. He built the Janardana Swami Temple at Varkala approximately 2,000 years ago. Due to the presence of the temple, Varkala is also known as the "Varanasi of the South".

The place is referred to as "Balita" in the first century Greek text Periplus of the Erythraean Sea. In the 18th century, it was also referred to as Udaya Marathandapuram, named after Marthanda Varma, the founder of the Travancore Kingdom.

== Geography ==
Varkala is located about 50 km (31 mi) from Thiruvananthapuram in Kerala. The town is spread over an area of 15.42 km^{2} (5.95 sq mi).

=== Varkala cliffs ===
The Varkala cliff formations found along a 7.5 km (4.7 mi) stretch of the Arabian Sea coast has been declared a National Geological Monument by the Geological Survey of India. These cliff formations were formed by erosion of the sedimentary rocks of Warkalli Formation and were exposed following further tectonic movements and upliftment. These exposed sandstone beds, dating to Miocene–Pliocene (23 to 2.58 Ma), occurs along with laterite, and streaks of lignite and marcasite. These rest on khondalite of the Precambrian period.

=== Climate ===
Varkala has an average temperature of 32 °C (90 °F) in the summer. It receives an average annual precipitation of 310 cm (120 in), mostly during the monsoon season that lasts from June to August. The winters are mild and lasts from December to February.

Climate data for Varkala
| Month | Jan | Feb | Mar | Apr | May | Jun | Jul | Aug | Sep | Oct | Nov | Dec | Year |
|---|---|---|---|---|---|---|---|---|---|---|---|---|---|
| Mean daily maximum °C (°F) | 29.9 (85.8) | 30.7 (87.3) | 31.7 (89.1) | 31.8 (89.2) | 31.3 (88.3) | 29.1 (84.4) | 28.6 (83.5) | 28.9 (84.0) | 29.3 (84.7) | 29.3 (84.7) | 29.1 (84.4) | 29.3 (84.7) | 29.9 (85.8) |
| Daily mean °C (°F) | 26.1 (79.0) | 26.9 (80.4) | 28.1 (82.6) | 28.6 (83.5) | 28.2 (82.8) | 26.5 (79.7) | 25.9 (78.6) | 26.2 (79.2) | 26.5 (79.7) | 26.5 (79.7) | 26.2 (79.2) | 26 (79) | 26.8 (80.3) |
| Mean daily minimum °C (°F) | 22.4 (72.3) | 23.2 (73.8) | 24.5 (76.1) | 25.4 (77.7) | 25.2 (77.4) | 23.9 (75.0) | 23.3 (73.9) | 23.5 (74.3) | 23.7 (74.7) | 23.7 (74.7) | 23.4 (74.1) | 22.7 (72.9) | 23.7 (74.7) |
| Average precipitation mm (inches) | 19 (0.7) | 27 (1.1) | 52 (2.0) | 144 (5.7) | 248 (9.8) | 457 (18.0) | 336 (13.2) | 222 (8.7) | 201 (7.9) | 290 (11.4) | 205 (8.1) | 55 (2.2) | 2,256 (88.8) |
| Average rainy days | 1 | 2 | 3 | 8 | 10 | 19 | 17 | 14 | 11 | 12 | 8 | 3 | 108 |
| Mean daily sunshine hours | 9 | 9 | 8 | 8 | 7 | 5 | 5 | 6 | 6 | 6 | 6 | 7 | 7 |
Source: Climate-Data.org

== Demographics ==
As per the 2011 Census of India, Varkala had a population of 40,048 individuals of which 18,312 were males and 21,736 were females. About 4,479 (11.2%) of the population was below the age of six years. The sex ratio was 1187 females per thousand males, higher than the state average of 1084. Varkala had a literacy rate of 93.6%, slightly lower than state average of 94%. The male literacy was 95.4% and female literacy rate was 92%. About 70.6% of the population adhered to Hinduism, while 28.9% followed Islam.

== Administration and politics ==
Varkala is a municipality and is administered by the Varkala Municipality. The municipality is administratively divided into 33 wards. It has six standing committees which are responsible for basic facilities and city or local government functions. Varkala forms part of the Varkala Assembly constituency, which forms part of the Attingal Lok Sabha constituency.

== Transport ==
The Varkala Tunnel system was constructed between 1867 and 1880. It consists of two tunnels, measuring 1,877 ft (572 m) and 2,370 ft (720 m) long, and completed in 1877 and 1880 respectively. It forms part of the waterway connecting the backwaters of Kerala, and used maily for ferrying goods.

Varkala is connected by the State Highway 64 with Madathara. The National Highway 66 passes through the Varkala taluk. The town is served by the Varkala railway station. The Thiruvananthapuram International Airport is located 57 km (35 mi) away.

== Tourism and recreation ==
The Varkala Beach consists of several water springs and ayurveda centers located close to the beach. It is popular as the location of the Hindu tradition of "Vavu beli". It is also called Papanasam beach, as taking a dip in the sea waters is said to absolve one of its sins. The Thiruvambady beach is a black sand beach located close to the northern end of the Varkala cliffs. The Ponnumthuruthu (Golden Island) is located off the coast of Varkala. It houses an old Shiva temple and is a bird watching destination.

The Varkala Cultural Centre hosts several art performances including Kathakali. The Anjengo Fort at Anchuthengu is a fort near Varkala, that is associated with European colonisation of the coast. Other places of interest include the Ashram-Sivagiri Mutt, founded by Hindu philosopher Narayana Guru and the samadhi of Narayana Guru.

== See also ==
- Kovalam
