= Island Express (train) =

Indian Railways train

KSR Bengaluru - Kanyakumari Island Express
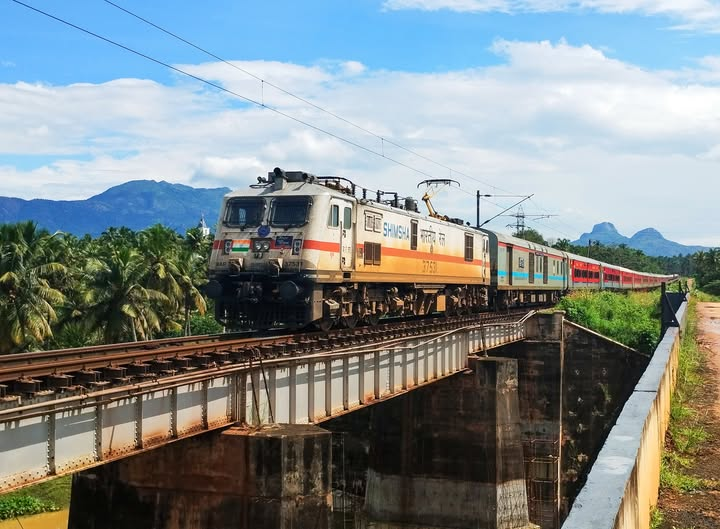
- Island Express

Overview
- Service type: Express
- Locale: Karnataka, Kerala, Andhra Pradesh and Tamil Nadu
- First service: 1 August 1864; 162 years ago (Initial run from Bengaluru to Coimbatore together with Bengaluru Mail till Jolarpet & Nilgiri till Coimbatore; 1 July 1940; 86 years ago (Extended to Cochin Harbour Terminus as separate train in Bengaluru City to Coimbatore and slip coach afterwards); 1960s (as separate train till Cochin Harbour Terminus); 1976; 50 years ago (extended to Thiruvananthapuram Central); 1988; 38 years ago (extended to Nagercoil Junction); 1992; 34 years ago (extended to Kanniyakumari)
- Current operator: South Western Railways

Route
- Termini: Bengaluru City (SBC); Kanyakumari (CAPE)
- Stops: 43
- Distance travelled: 929 km (577 mi)
- Average journey time: 19h 40m
- Service frequency: Daily
- Train number: 16525 / 16526

On-board services
- Classes: First AC, AC 2 tier, AC 3 tier, AC 3 tier Economy, Sleeper class, General unreserved
- Seating arrangements: Yes
- Sleeping arrangements: Yes
- Auto-rack arrangements: Yes
- Catering facilities: E-catering
- Observation facilities: Large windows
- Baggage facilities: Under seats

Technical
- Rolling stock: LHB coach
- Track gauge: 1,676 mm (5 ft 6 in)
- Electrification: 200 megawatts
- Operating speed: 50.00 km/h (31.07 mph) average including halts
- Rake sharing: Chennai Egmore Kanniyakumari Superfast fast express

The 16525 /16526 Island Express is one of the most prestigious Indian Railways train running between Bengaluru City and Kanyakumari railway station, Kanyakumari. Train no. 16526 runs from Bengaluru to Kanyakumari, and Train No. 16525 runs in the reverse direction. The train runs daily through the state of Kerala (via Thiruvananthapuram, Kollam Junction Kottayam, Ernakulam, Thrissur and Palakkad Junction) and covers the 929km journey. The train's name comes from its original terminus at Willingdon Island in Cochin, a service which ended in the mid-1970s.

== About the name of the train ==
No part of the train's route is on an island; the name was given because the predecessor of this train used to end its journey at the Cochin Harbour Terminus station in Willingdon Island, Cochin, until the mid-1970s. At that time, it was the only train that connected Bengaluru (Karnataka state) to Kerala.

== Significance ==
Train number 16526 covers the 929 km journey in 18 hours 40 minutes, while train 16525 takes close to 20 hours 50 minutes for the return journey. Due to the extremely slow speed of the train and the large number of stops in Kerala, this train has earned the moniker of being known as the "Supercrawler Express of Kerala". Despite this, the Island Express is still one of the most preferred trains by Keralites residing in Bengaluru for travelling to Kerala. This was the only daily train between Bengaluru and Trivandrum until early 2006.

== Coach composition ==
Island Express has 22 coaches, which include 7 sleeper class coaches (S1–S7), one A/C 3-tier economy coach (M1), 5 A/C 3-tier coaches (B1–B5), two A/C 2-tier coaches (A1, A2), one first-class coach (H1), and the rest being 4 unreserved coaches, earlier was ICF brick red coach rakes.

This train was previously hauled by a WAP-4 and is now hauled by a Krishnarajapuram WAP-7, a 6,350 HP AC Passenger Locomotive.

== Coach position ==
LOCO-SLR-UR-UR-S1-S2-S3-S4-S5-S6-S7-M1-B1-B2-B3-B4-B5-H1-A1-A2-UR-UR-EOG

LOCO-EOG-UR-UR-A2-A1-H1-B5-B4-B3-B2-B1-M1-S7-S6-S5-S4-S3-S2-S1-UR-UR-SLR

== Routes and halts ==
- Kanniyakumari - CAPE
- Nagercoil Junction - NCJ
- Eraniel - ERL
- Kulitturai - KZT
- Parassala - PASA
- Neyyattinkara - NYY
- Thiruvananthapuram Central - TVC
- Kazhakkuttam - KZK
- Chirayinkeezhu - CRY
- Kadakavur - KVU
- Varkala Sivagiri - VAK
- Paravur - PVU
- Kollam Junction - QLN
- Sasthankotta - STKT
- Karunagappalli - KPY
- Kayamkulam Junction - KYJ
- Mavelikara - MVLK
- Chengannur - CNGR
- Tiruvalla - TRVL
- Changanassery - CGY
- Kottayam - KTYM
- Piravom Road - PVRD
- Thrippunithura - TRTR
- Ernakulam Town - ERN
- Aluva - AWY
- Angamali (Kalady) - AFK
- Chalakudi - CKI
- Irinjalakkuda- IJK
- Pudukkad - PUK
- Thrissur - TCR
- Wadakancheri WKI
- Ottappalam - OTP
- Palakkad Junction - PGT
- Coimbatore Junction - CBE
- Tiruppur - TUP
- Erode Junction - ED
- Salem Junction - SA
- Tirupattur - TPT
- Kuppam - KPN
- Bangarapet Junction - BWT
- Malur - MLO
- Whitefield - WFD
- Krishnarajapuram - KJM
- Bengaluru East - BNCE
- Bengaluru Cantonment - BNC
- KSR Bengaluru City Junction

== History ==
The exact history of the Island Express is somewhat hazy as surprisingly there are no accurate reports available about the early origins of the train. Legend passed down word of mouth has it that the train that is called the Island Express today started its run in the 1940s as some 3 or 4 slip coaches attached to an ancient 562/561 Cochin–Madras Express which ran out of Cochin Harbor Terminus (CHTS). The slip coaches attached to this would then be detached at Jolarpettai and attached to another train (Bangalore Mail) which would take them to Bangalore. Years passed by and sometime in the 1960s, these slip coaches grew into a separate train which was christened the 25/26 Cochin–Bangalore–Cochin Island Express. It continued to run between Cochin Harbor and Bangalore until 1976 when the Ernakulam–Kottayam–Thiruvananthapuram route was converted to broad gauge. The Island then had to say goodbye to its island as it was extended to Thiruvananthapuram. As new lines were commissioned it was extended to Nagercoil in 1988 and subsequently to Kanniyakumari in 1992.

The Island Express briefly had through coaches to Mangalore Central where It used to be attached/detached to the Link Mangala Exp (2625A/26A) at Palakkad Jn. This continued until 1993 when Mangala Exp was made an Independent Train. From 1993 onwards until 2000, The coaches were linked to the newly started 387/388 Coimbatore Mangalore Coimbatore Fast Passengers at Palakkad Jn.

The erstwhile 19/20 Cochin–Madras Express is today's 12624/12623 Chennai–Trivandrum Mail (Madras Mail) and the 25/26 Island Express is today officially, the 16525/16526 Kanyakumari–Bangalore "Island" Express.

The Island Express derives its name from the Willingdon Island, on which the CHTS station is situated and from where the train started its journey. The Express that goes to an Island, The name got so entrenched with the public, that even though it is no longer the official name of the train, it is still called so. The train lost Island as its official railways-recognized name once its destination was moved from Willington Island to TVC, NCJ and CAPE. Its official name today is Kanyakumari Express and Bangalore Express for the respective destinations. But the travelling public still calls the train The Island Express, reminiscent of its old name almost two generations ago. No one uses the official names as there are other Bangalore and Kanyakumari Expresses and destination place names are not popular as train names.

== Accidents ==
Island Express was involved in an accident in July 1988 while crossing the Perumon railway bridge near Perinadu, Kollam, Kerala. 10 coaches of the train fell over Ashtamudi Lake, 105 people lost their lives and 200 people were injured.

It also met with another accident at Kuppam on 21 May 1967. The train, which left Bangalore at 6 pm, did not stop at the railway station and went on to hit the buffers at the end of the loop line around 9 pm. Several people died.
