= Chottanikkara Road railway station =

Railway station in Kerala, India

Chottanikkara Road

General information
- Other names: Kurikad,
- Location: Kureekkad, Ernakulam, Kerala; India
- Coordinates: 9.92441°N 76.37600°E
- System: Regional rail, light rail and commuter rail station
- Owner: Indian Railways
- Operator: Southern Railway zone
- Line: Ernakulam–Kottayam–Kollam line
- Platforms: 2
- Tracks: 2

Construction
- Structure type: At–grade
- Parking: Available

Other information
- Status: Functioning
- Station code: KFE
- Zone(s): Southern Railway zone
- Division(s): Thiruvananthapuram
- Fare zone: Indian Railways

History
- Opened: 1956; 70 years ago
Location
- Location within India Location within Kerala

Chottanikkara Road railway station (code: KFE) is a railway station in the Southern Railway zone, Ernakulam District, Kerala. Thripunithura is the closest station at 4 km.

It falls under the Thiruvananthapuram railway division of the Southern Railway zone, Indian Railways. It is located in the town of Kureekkad, where a rail overbridge project is delayed due to land acquisition in 2025.

== See also ==
- Ernakulam–Kottayam–Kayamkulam line
- Kottayam railway station
- Tiruvalla railway station
- Changanacherry railway station
- Kayamkulam Junction railway station
- Ernakulam Junction railway station
- Ernakulam Town railway station
- Thiruvananthapuram railway division
