= Chennai–Thiruvananthapuram Superfast Express =

Train in India

M. G . R Chennai Central – Thiruvananthapuram Central Superfast Express
Overview
- Service type: Superfast Express
- Status: Operating daily
- Locale: Kerala and Tamil Nadu
- First service: 30 May 2006
- Current operators: Southern Railway Zone, Indian Railways

Route
- Termini: Thiruvananthapuram; Chennai
- Stops: 19
- Distance travelled: 918 km (570 mi)
- Average journey time: 16 hours, 10 minutes
- Service frequency: Daily
- Train number: 12695 / 12696

On-board services
- Classes: AC first class, AC 2 tier, AC 3 tier, sleeper class, unreserved
- Seating arrangements: Yes
- Sleeping arrangements: Yes
- Catering facilities: No pantry car
- Observation facilities: Large windows in all carriages
- Baggage facilities: Below the seats

Technical
- Rolling stock: Two
- Track gauge: Broad
- Electrification: Fully Electrified
- Operating speed: 85 km/h (53 mph) average including halts

The 12695/12696 M.G.R Chennai Central – Thiruvananthapuram Superfast Express is a daily Superfast Express train connecting Chennai to Thiruvananthapuram. The train was introduced on 30 May 2006 and runs daily from Chennai Central to Thiruvananthapuram Central.

== Coach composition ==
The train has a standard ICF coach with a max speed of 120 km/h (75 mph). The train consists of 23 coaches:

- 1 AC 2 tiers
- 4 AC 3 tiers
- 12 Sleeper classes
- 2 Unreserved/General
- 2 Seating cum luggage rakes
- 1 AC FIRST cum AC two tier

As with most train services in India, coach composition may be amended at the discretion of Indian Railways depending on demand. It also has rake sharing with 22639/22640 Chennai Central Alappuzha Superfast Express.

== Timings ==
MGR Chennai Central (15:25 PM) → Thiruvananthapuram Central (07:35 AM)

Thiruvananthapuram Central (17:20 PM) → MGR Chennai Central (10:00 AM)

Important halts on this route are:

- Thiruvananthapuram Central
- Varkala
- Kollam Junction
- Kayamkulam Junction
- Mavelikara
- Chengannur
- Tiruvalla
- Changanasseri
- Kottayam
- Ernakulam Town
- Thrissur
- Palakkad Junction
- Coimbatore Junction
- Tiruppur
- Erode Junction
- Salem Junction
- Jolarpettai Junction
- Vaniyambadi
- Katpadi Junction
- Arakkonam Junction
- MGR Chennai Central
