= Piravam Road railway station =

Railway station in Kerala, India

Piravom Road

General information
- Location: Velloor, Kottayam, Kerala; India
- Coordinates: 9.829666°N 76.455243°E
- System: Regional rail, light rail & commuter rail station
- Owner: Indian Railways
- Operator: Southern Railway zone
- Line: Ernakulam–Kottayam–Kollam line
- Platforms: 4
- Tracks: 4

Construction
- Structure type: At–grade
- Parking: Available

Other information
- Status: Functioning
- Station code: PVRD
- Zone(s): Southern Railway zone
- Division(s): Thiruvananthapuram
- Fare zone: Indian Railways

History
- Opened: 1956; 70 years ago
Location
- Location within India Location within Kerala

Piravom Road railway station (station code: PVRD) is an NSG–5 category Indian railway station in Thiruvananthapuram railway division of Southern Railway zone. It is a railway station in Kottayam district, Kerala and falls under the Thiruvananthapuram railway division of the Southern Railway zone, Indian Railways. It is located in the village of Velloor.

== See also ==
- Ernakulam–Kottayam–Kollam line
- Kottayam railway station
- Tiruvalla railway station
- Changanasseri railway station
- Kayamkulam Junction railway station
- Ernakulam Town railway station
- Ernakulam Junction railway station
- Thiruvananthapuram railway division
