= List of rail tunnels in Kerala =

This is a list of railway tunnels in Kerala.

== Location ==
The state of Kerala is sandwiched between Western Ghats and Laccadive Sea and the state has an undulating topography. The state is served by Thiruvananthapuram railway division, Palakkad railway division and Madurai railway divisions in Southern Railway zone of Indian Railways.

== List ==
Rank	Name and route	Track length (m)	Station	Station	District	Railway Division	Year of Opening	Coordination	Picture
1.	Trivandrum Port Tunnel in new port line.	9020 metres	Vizhinjam International Seaport	Balaramapuram	Thiruvananthapuram	Thiruvananthapuram	To be Decided	Design and Planning phase.	
2.	Aryankavu Tunnel in Kollam–Sengottai Line	680 metres	Aryankavu	Bhagavathipuram	Kollam	Madurai	1904	Gauge conversion completed in 2018.	
3.	Thannivila Tunnel in Thiruvananthapuram–Nagercoil–Kanyakumari line	200 metres	Nemom	Balaramapuram	Thiruvananthapuram	Thiruvananthapuram	1979		
4.	Kalanad Tunnel in Shoranur–Mangalore line	161 metres	Kotikulam	Kalanad	Kasaragod	Palakkad	1905	Parallel tunnel opened in 2002.	
5.	Kottayam Twin tunnels in Ernakulam–Kottayam–Kayamkulam line	84 meters and 67 metres	Kottayam	Chingavanam	Kottayam	Thiruvananthapuram	1957	Became redundant post track doubling in 2022.	

== See also ==
- List of rail tunnels in India by length
