= Nagercoil Junction–Mangaluru Junction Amrit Bharat Express =

Amrit Bharat Express train route in India

Nagercoil Junction – Mangaluru Junction Amrit Bharat Express
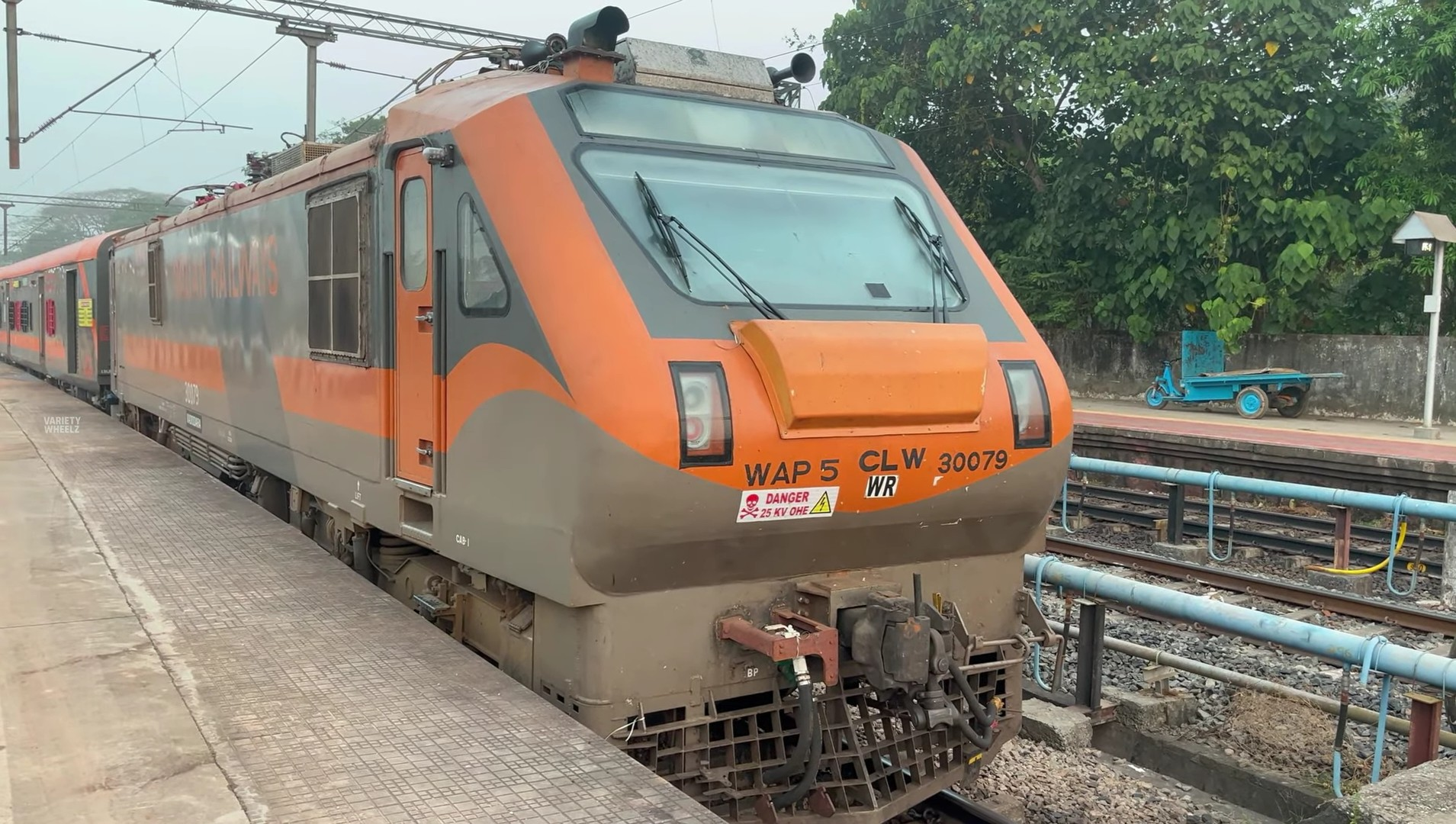
- NCJ–MAJN standing at Mangaluru Junction

Overview
- Service type: Amrit Bharat Express, Superfast
- Status: Active
- Locale: Tamil Nadu, Kerala and Karnataka
- First service: 23 January 2026; 5 months ago (Inaugural); 27 January 2026; 5 months ago (Commercial)
- Current operator: Southern Railways (SR)

Route
- Termini: Nagercoil Junction (NCJ); Mangaluru Junction (MAJN)
- Stops: 21
- Distance travelled: 693 km (431 mi)
- Average journey time: 17 hrs 20 mins
- Service frequency: Weekly
- Train number: 16329/16330
- Lines used: Nagercoil–Thiruvananthapuram line; Thiruvananthapuram–Kollam line; Kollam–Ernakulam line (via Kayamkulam and Kottayam); Ernakulam–Shornur line; Shoranur–Mangaluru line

On-board services
- Class: Sleeper class coach (SL) General unreserved coach (GS)
- Seating arrangements: Yes
- Sleeping arrangements: Yes
- Auto-rack arrangements: Upper
- Catering facilities: On-board catering
- Observation facilities: Saffron-grey
- Entertainment facilities: Electric outlets; Reading lights; Bottle holder
- Other facilities: CCTV cameras; Bio-vacuum toilets; Foot-operated water taps; Passenger information system

Technical
- Rolling stock: Modified LHB coaches
- Track gauge: Indian gauge
- Electrification: 25 kV 50 Hz AC overhead line
- Operating speed: 40 km (25 mi) (Avg.)
- Track owner: Indian Railways
- Rake sharing: No

The 16329/16330 Nagercoil Junction–Mangaluru Junction Amrit Bharat Express is India's 26th non-AC Superfast Amrit Bharat Express train, which runs across the states of Tamil Nadu, Kerala and Karnataka by connecting the tip of the Indian peninsula to the rest of the country Nagercoil Junction with Mangaluru Junction, the scenic Konkan Railway to the southern and eastern parts of India.

The express train is inaugurated on 23 January 2026 by Honorable Prime Minister Narendra Modi through video conference.

== Overview ==
The train is operated by Indian Railways, connecting Nagercoil Junction and Mangalore Junction. It is currently operated 16329/16330 on weekly basis.

== Rakes ==
It is the 26th Amrit Bharat 2.0 Express train in which the locomotives were designed by Chittaranjan Locomotive Works (CLW) at Chittaranjan, West Bengal and the coaches were designed and manufactured by the Integral Coach Factory at Perambur, Chennai under the Make in India initiative.

== Schedule ==
Train schedule: Nagercoil ↔ Mangaluru Amrit Bharat Express
| Train no. | Station code | Departure station | Departure time | Departure day | Arrival station | Arrival hours |
|---|---|---|---|---|---|---|
| 16329 | NCJ | Nagercoil Junction | 11:40 AM | Mangaluru Junction | 5:00 AM | 17h 20m |
| 16330 | MAJN | Mangaluru Junction | 8:00 AM | Nagercoil Junction | 10:05 PM | 14h 5m |

== Routes and halts ==
The halts for this 16329/16330 Nagercoil–Mangaluru Amrit Bharat Express are as follows:-

1. Nagercoil Junction
2. Thiruvananthapuram Central
3. Varkala Sivagiri
4. Kollam Junction
5. Karunagappalli
6. Kayamkulam Junction
7. Mavelikara
8. Chengannur
9. Tiruvalla
10. Changanasseri
11. Kottayam
12. Ernakulam Town
13. Aluva
14. Thrissur
15. Shoranur Junction
16. Tirur
17. Kozhikode
18. Thalassery
19. Kannur
20. Kasaragod
21. Mangaluru Junction

== Rake reversal ==
No rake reversal or rake share.

== See also ==
- Amrit Bharat Express
- Vande Bharat Express
- Rajdhani Express
- Nagercoil Junction
- Mangalore Junction

== Notes ==
a. Runs a day in a week with both directions.
