= Tripunithura railway station =

Railway station in Kerala, India

Tripunithura
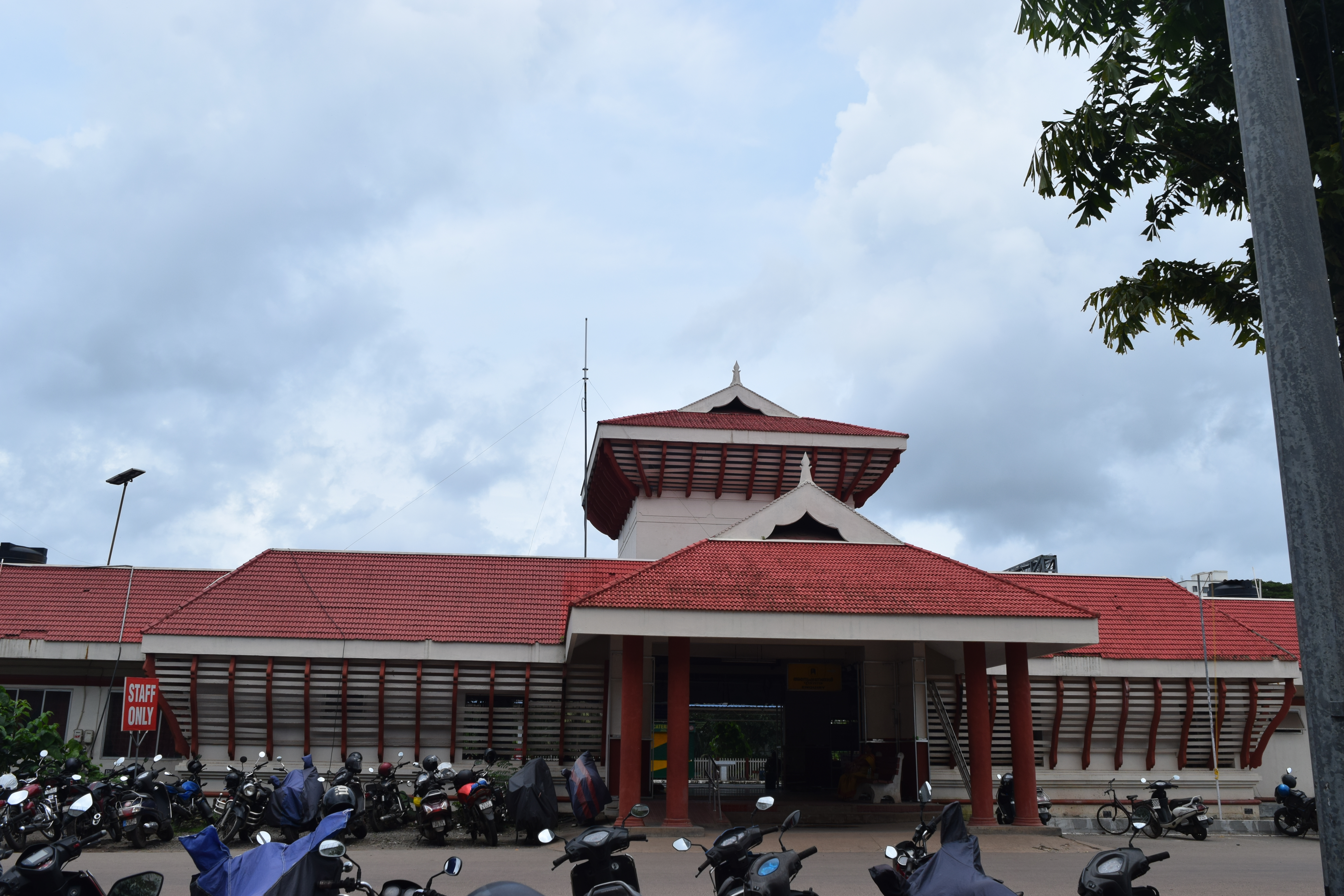
- Tripunithura railway station

General information
- Location: Tripunithura, Kerala, India
- Coordinates: 9.949752°N 76.352556°E
- Elevation: 18 m (59 ft)
- System: Indian Railways station
- Owner: Indian Railways
- Operator: Southern Railway zone
- Lines: Ernakulam South–Ernakulam Town, Ernakulam–Kottayam–Kollam line
- Platforms: 2
- Tracks: 4
- Connections: Thrippunithura Terminal

Construction
- Structure type: Standard on-ground station

Other information
- Status: Functioning
- Station code: TRTR
- Zone(s): Southern Railway zone
- Division(s): Thiruvananthapuram
- Classification: NSG-5

History
- Electrified: 25 kV AC 50 Hz
Location
- Location within India Location within Kerala

Tripunithura railway station (station code: TRTR) is an NSG–4 category Indian railway station in Thiruvananthapuram railway division of Southern Railway zone. It is a railway terminal located at Tripunithura, Kochi, in the Indian state of Kerala. The station is on the rail route between Thiruvananthapuram Central and Ernakulam Junction via Kottayam.

== History ==
During the construction of the first railway line in Kerala the king of the royal kingdom of Kochi sold 14 golden caparisons of elephants of Poornathrayeesha temple at Tripunithura to finance the track between Ernakulam and Shoranur.

== Layout ==
Tripunithara railway station has two platforms for handling long distance and passenger trains.

== Significance ==
- Tripunithara railway station connected to Kochi metro, Prominent industries like FACT, Kochi Refineries, Hindustan Organics and Chemicals Ltd, Carbon Black Industries Ltd etc. are in close proximity to the Tripunithura railway station. The information technology park InfoPark, Kochi, is situated at a distance of 9.5 km from Tripunithura railway station. Tripunithura and Aluva is the entry point for travelers from Idukki district, which is not connected to a rail network. It is also the nearest station for people going to Muvattupuzha, Kolenchery, Puthencruz, Thiruvankulam, Maradu, Kundannur and Chottanikkara Temple.
- Tripunithura railway station is located on the side of the Thrippunithura Terminal metro station of the Kochi metro.

== Services ==
=== SuperFast/Express trains ===
No.	Train no.	Origin	Destination	Train name
1.	12623/12624	Thiruvananthapuram Central	Chennai Central	Chennai Mail
2.	16382 Only	Mumbai	Kanyakumari	Jayanthi Janatha Express
3.	16303/16304	Thiruvananthapuram Central	Ernakulam Junction	Vanchinad Express
4.	16525/16526	Kanyakumari	Bangalore	Island Express
5.	22647/22648	Thiruvananthapuram Central	Korba via Chennai Central	Korba Express
6.	16649/16650	Nagercoil	Mangalore Central	Parasuram Express
7.	16301/16302	Thiruvananthapuram Central	Shornur Junction	Venad Express
8.	16629/16630	Thiruvananthapuram Central	Mangalore Central	Malabar Express

=== Passenger trains ===
No.	Train no.	Origin	Destination	Train name
1.	56385/56386	Kottayam	Ernakulam South	Kottayam–Ernakulam Passenger
2.	56391/56392	Kollam	Ernakulam South	Kollam–Ernakulam Passenger
3.	56387/56388	Kayamkulam	Ernakulam South	Kayankulam–Ernakulam Passenger
4.	66300/66301	Kollam	Ernakulam South	Kollam–Ernakulam MEMU
5.	66307/66308	Kollam	Ernakulam South	Kollam–Ernakulam MEMU
6.	56390/56391	Kottayam	Ernakulam South	Ernakulam–Kottayam Passenger
7.	56387/56388	Kayamkulam	Ernakulam South	Kayamkulam–Ernakulam Passenger
8.	56365/56366	Punalur	Guruvayur	Punalur–Guruvayur Fast Passenger

== See also ==
- Ernakulam Junction
- Ernakulam Town
- Seaport-Airport Road
- Transport in Kochi
- Aluva railway station
- Cochin Harbour Terminus
