= Tiruvalla railway station =

Railway station in Kerala

Tiruvalla
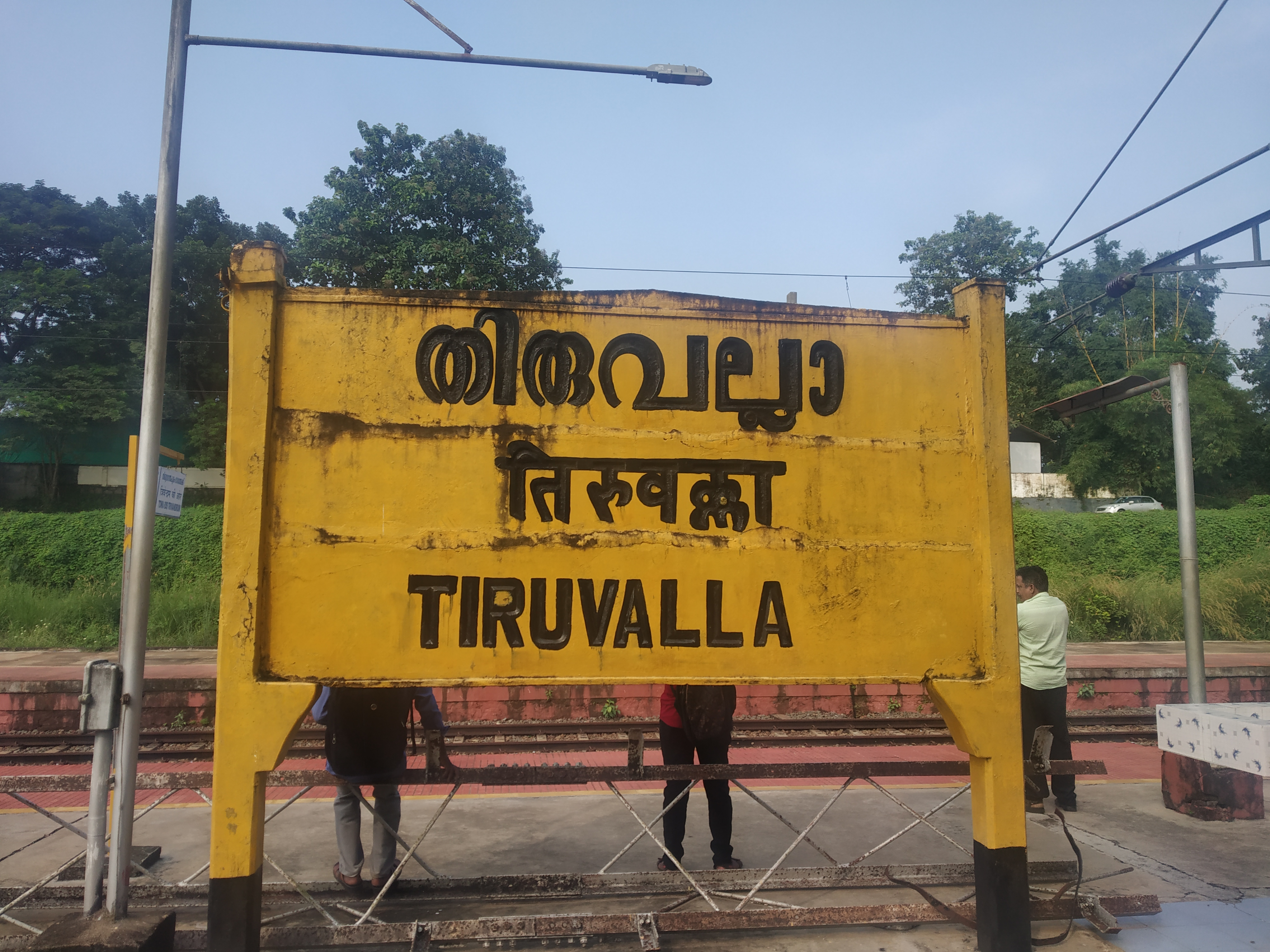
- Tiruvalla station name board

General information
- Location: Tiruvalla–Mallappally Road, Kuttappuzha, Thiruvalla, Pathanamthitta district, Kerala; India
- Coordinates: 9.3918°N 76.5799°E
- Elevation: 81.0 metres (265.7 ft)
- System: Indian Railways station
- Owner: Indian Railways
- Line: Ernakulam–Kottayam–Kollam line
- Platforms: 4 (3 for Passenger trains, 4th for Freight trains)
- Tracks: 4
- Connections: Taxi stand, Pre-paid auto service, Bus station

Construction
- Structure type: Standard (on-ground station)
- Parking: Available
- Accessible: Disabled access

Other information
- Status: Active
- Station code: TRVL
- Zone(s): Southern Railway
- Division(s): Thiruvananthapuram

Passengers
- Around 6,000 per day
Route map
Location

Tiruvalla railway station (station code: TRVL) is an NSG–3 category Indian railway station in Thiruvananthapuram railway division of Southern Railway zone. It is located in Pathanamthitta district, Kerala, India. Tiruvalla is the only railway station in the Pathanamthitta District. It has daily trains to cities like Thiruvananthapuram, Kochi, Kozhikode, Mangalore, Bangalore, Coimbatore, Madurai, Chennai, Hyderabad, Tirupati, Pune, Bhopal, Mumbai, New Delhi, Palani, Madurai, Kanyakumari and Rameswaram.

== Layout ==
Tiruvalla railway station has four platforms and four tracks. The railway station is one of the busy railway stations of Kerala, with about 6,000 passengers boarding trains on a daily basis, and generated an annual income of ₹18.82 crore (US$2.0 million) in the year 2016–17. Both long and short-distance trains stop at Tiruvalla, and at present the station is a way-side station, though terminal facilities could be developed. The Tiruvalla station lies in the Kayamkulam Junction–Kottayam–Ernakulam route, and along with the nearby Chengannur railway station, is an important station en route.

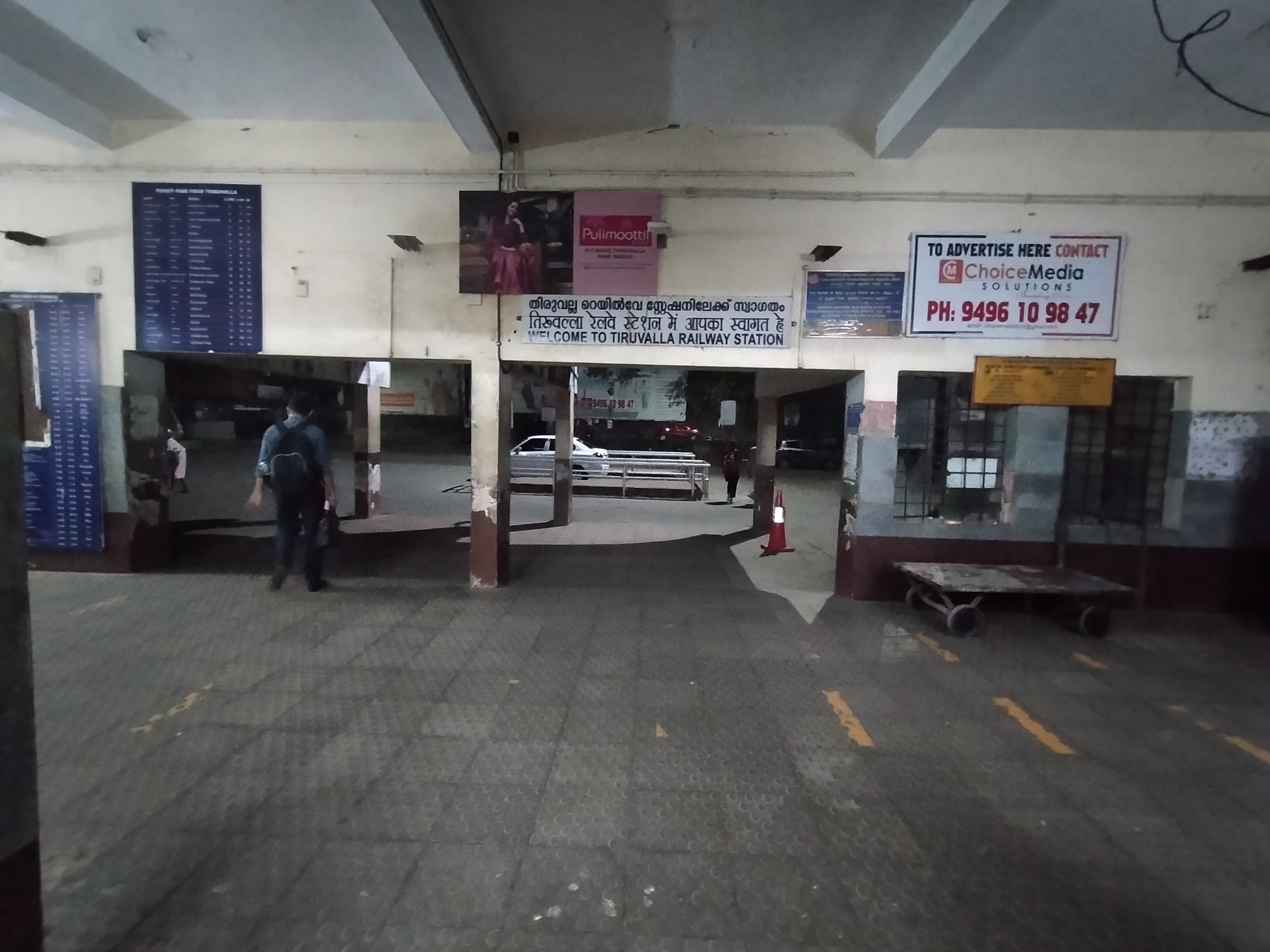
Station interior

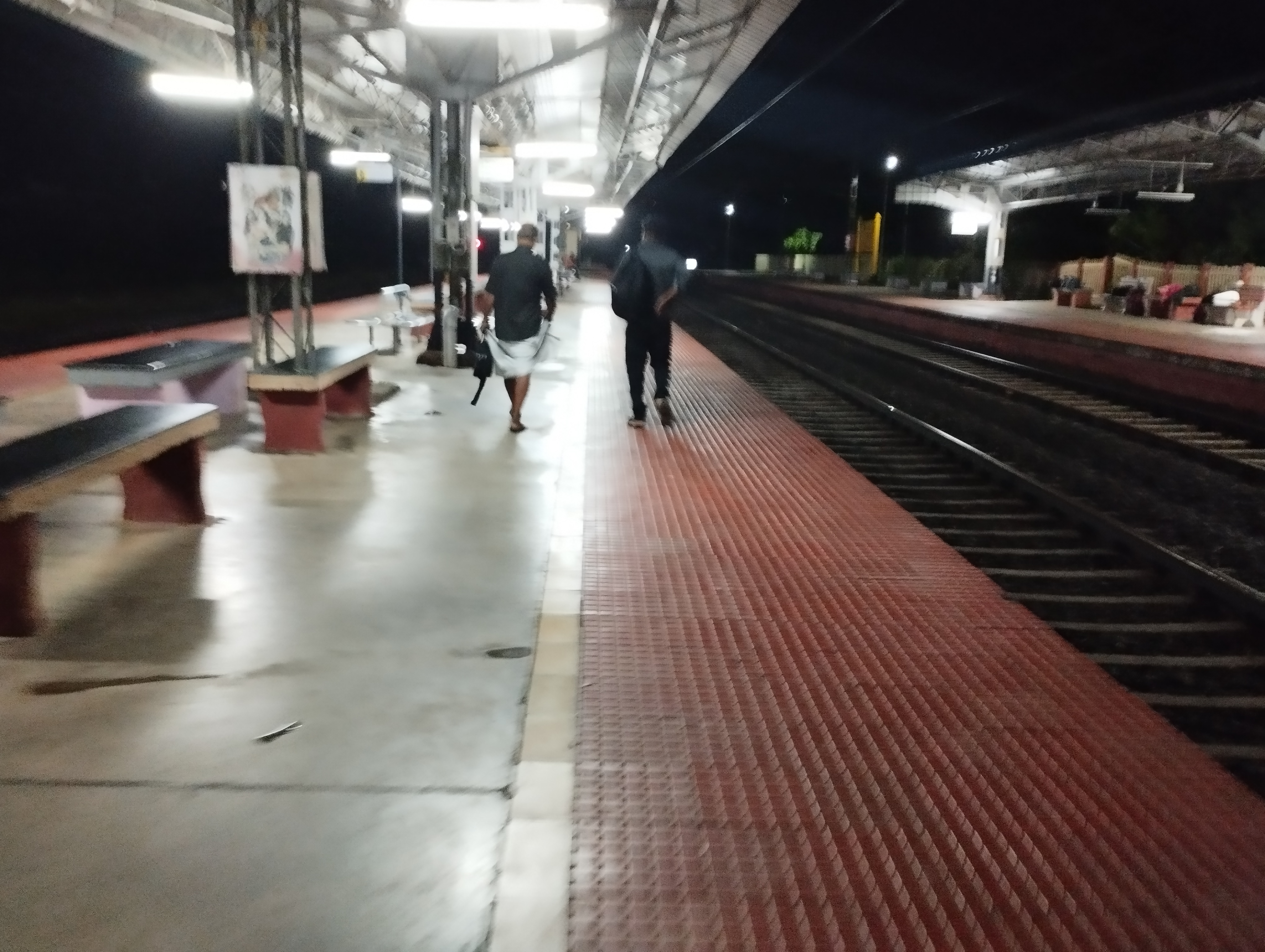
Station at night

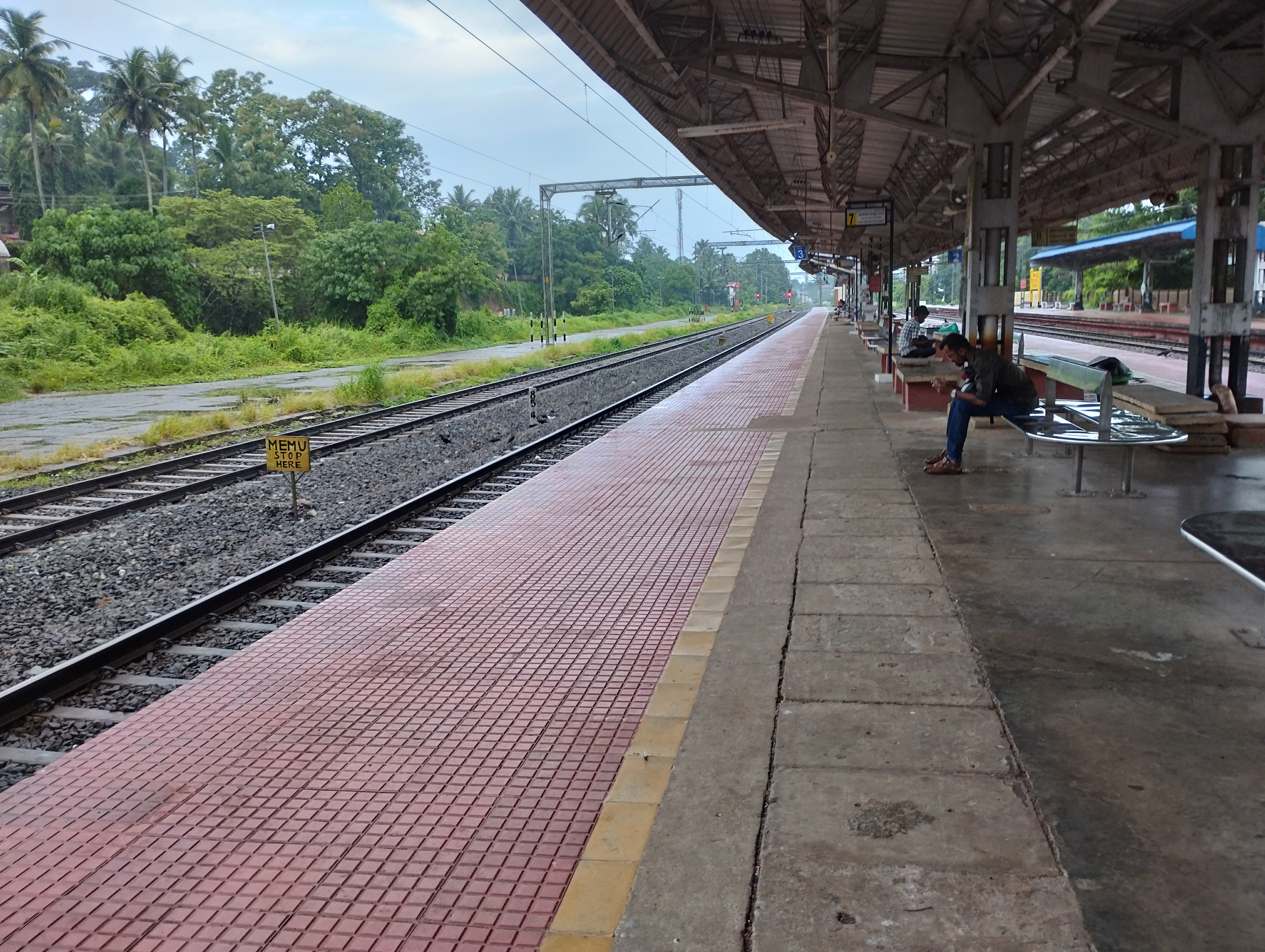
Platform no 3

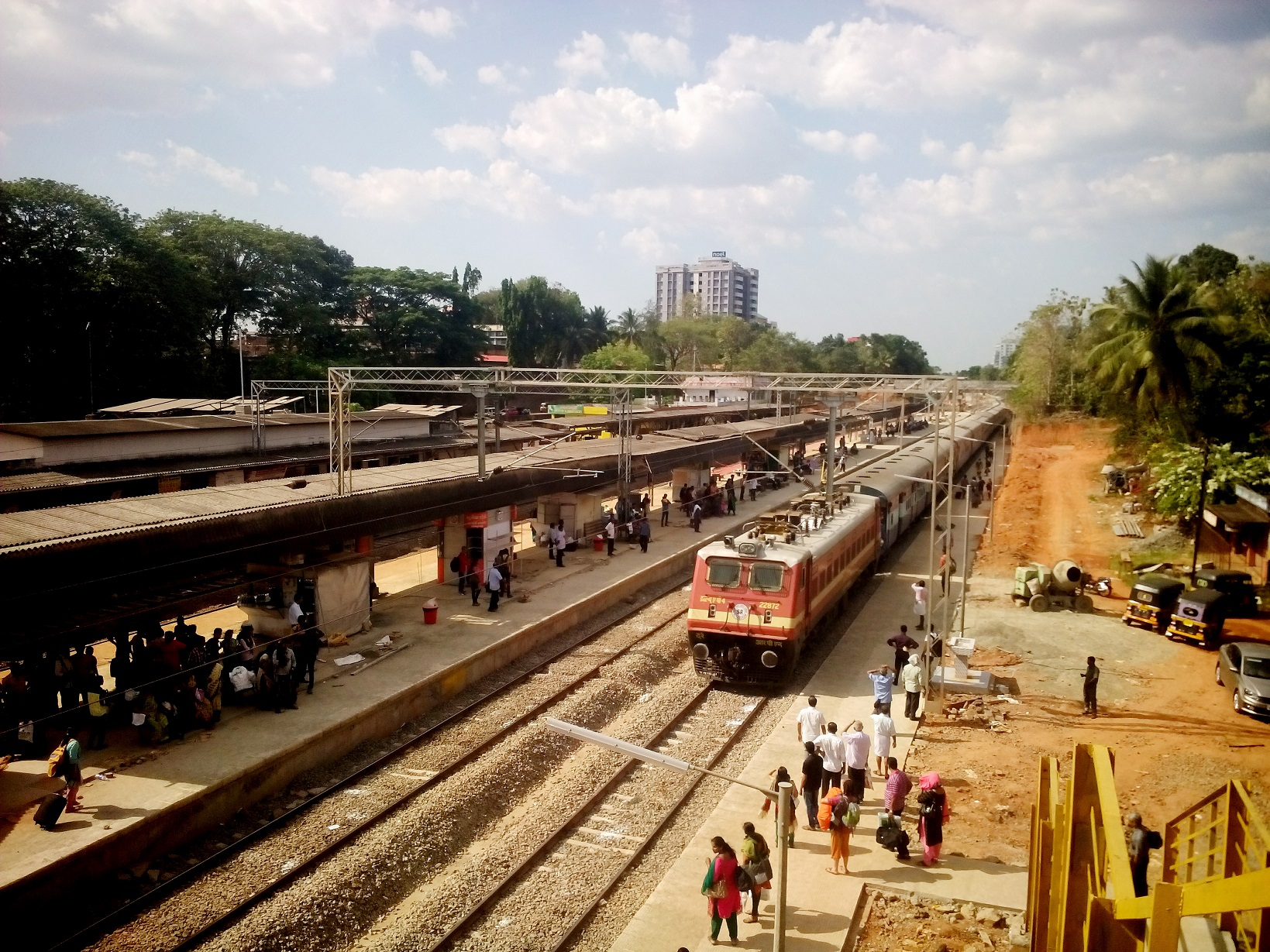
Platform no 4 under construction in 2016

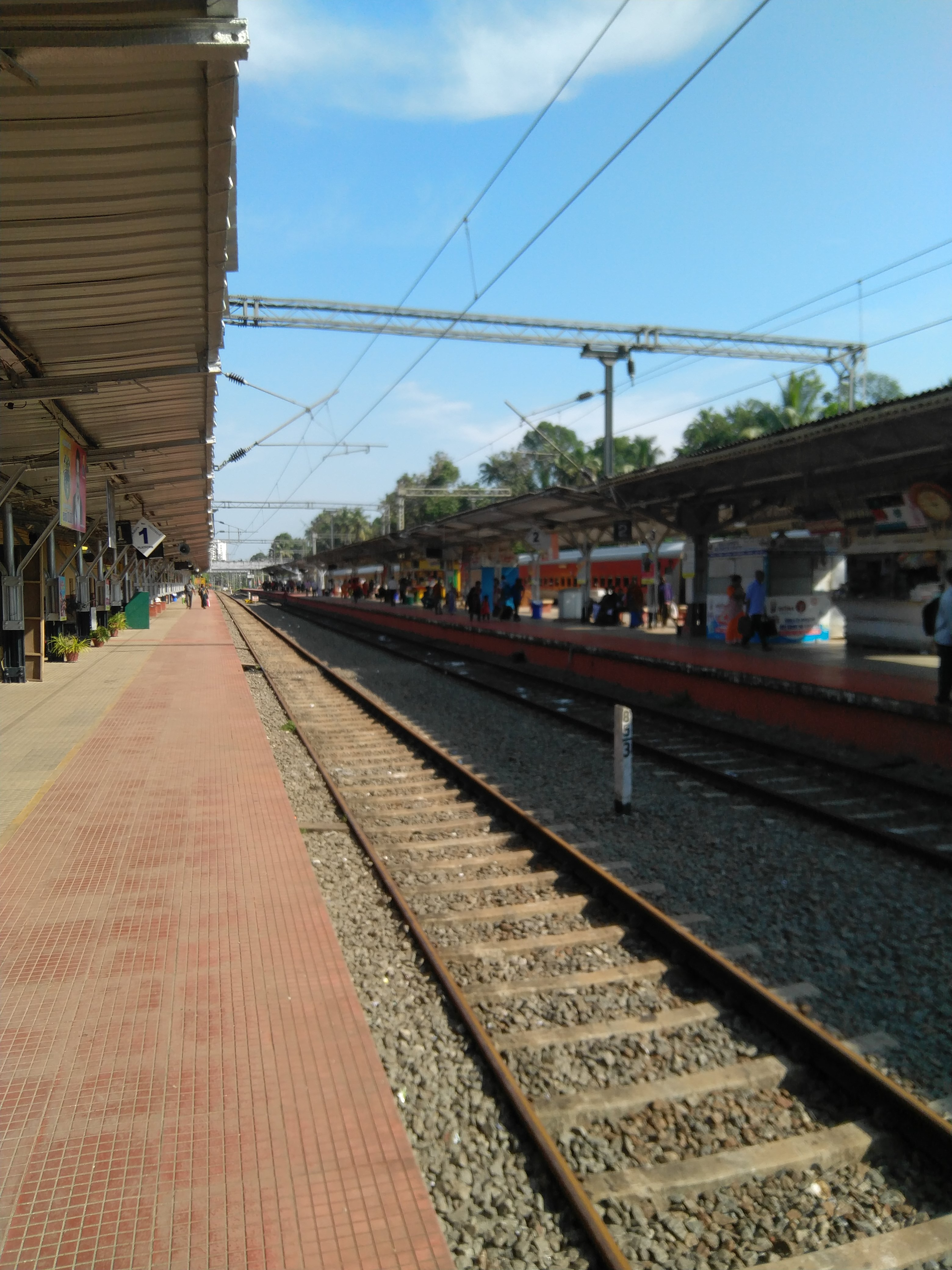

=== Modernisation ===
The Indian Railways have included Tiruvalla railway station in its development plan for 2016–17. The platform work and doubling of the track are in progress. Battery operated buggies may be introduced at the Tiruvalla station soon, which shall also facilitate the ferrying of the elderly and physically challenged people in the railway station. At present, the platforms are not fully covered, and the full covering of all platforms including the fourth shall also be implemented. Installation of escalators is also considered, connecting the four platforms.Now erection of an escalator is in progress.

The Railways would also set up a covered vehicle parking area near the Railway Mail Service complex, besides an upper class waiting room and VIP lounge at the railway station.

The station renovation work as part of the Amrit Bharat Scheme is nearing completion. The construction of the main entrance of the railway station, entrance porch, entrance arch, ceremonial flag, flyover, providing facilities for smooth entry, exit, and parking of vehicles arriving at the station, landscaping, signal and telecommunication systems have been implemented as part of the project.

== Significance ==
Tiruvalla railway station is the only railway station in the district of Pathanamthitta. The main importance of this station is highlighted by the fact that Sabarimala, a pilgrimage centre, is located in this district. The station, apart from facilitating the traffic of the residents of the commercial centre of Thiruvalla town and the workers from other states, is the main refuge for people living in the hilly tracts of Mallappally, Ranni, Kozhencherry, as well as the low-lying areas of Upper Kuttanad. It is also the alighting point for pilgrimage centers like Sabarimala, Parumala Church, Sree Vallabha Temple, Chakkulathukavu Temple, St. George Forane Church, Edathua, Maramon Convention as well as the cave temple and the old Shiva Temple of Tiruvalla at Kaviyoor.

== Major Trains ==
- Nagercoil–Mangaluru Amrit Bharat Express
- Charlapalli – Thiruvananthapuram North Amrit Bharat Express
- Kerala Express
- Thiruvananthapuram–Chennai Mail
- Chennai–Thiruvananthapuram Superfast Express
- Sabari Superfast Express
- Kannur–Thiruvananthapuram Jan Shatabdi Express
- Kanyakumari–Pune Express
- Palaruvi Express
- Parasuram Express
- Island Express
- Malabar Express
- Vanchinad Express
- Venad Express
- Thiruvananthapuram Central–Mangaluru Central Express
- Amritha Express
- Thiruvananthapuram North–Nilambur Road Rajya Rani Express
- Himsagar Express (Weekly)
- Aronai Express (Weekly)
- Thiruvananthapuram North–Lokmanya Tilak Terminus Garib Rath Express (Biweekly)
- Thiruvananthapuram North–Yesvantpur Garib Rath Express (Triweekly)
- Ernakulam-Velankanni Express (Biweekly)
- Gandhidham–Nagercoil Express (Weekly)
- Gurudev Express (Weekly)
- Thiruvananthapuram–Veraval Express (Weekly)
- Thiruvananthpuram–Korba Express (Biweekly)
- Kollam–Visakhapatnam Express (Weekly)
- Kollam–Tirupati Express (Biweekly)
- Thiruvananthapuram North–Shri Ganganagar Junction Express (Weekly)
- Hubballi–Thiruvananthapuram North Superfast Express (Weekly)
- Kochuveli–Bhavnagar Express (Weekly)
- Guruvayur-Madurai Express

== Facilities ==
- Computerised reservation ticket centre
- Computerised unreserved ticket centre
- Passenger information centre
- Tourist information centre
- IRCTC restaurant
- Passenger waiting rooms
- Escalator
- Lift
- First-Aid Room
- Foot overbridge
- ATM
- Prepaid autorikshaw counter
- Prepaid parking space

== Train Timings ==
Towards North
Train Number	Train Name	From	To	Via	Time	Schedule
22114	Thiruvananthapuram North - Mumbai LTT Superfast	Thiruvananthapuram North	Mumbai Lokamanya Tilak	Kottayam, Ernakulam, Shoranur, Kozhikode, Kannur, Mangalore, Madgaon, Panvel	3:05 AM	Mon, Thu
66322	Ernakulam MEMU	Kollam	Ernakulam Junction	Changanasseri, Kottayam	5:45 AM	Daily
16791	Palaruvi Express	Tuticorin	Palakkad	Kottayam, Ernakulam, Thrissur	6:07 AM	Daily
66328	Ernakulam MEMU	Kollam	Ernakulam Junction	Changanasseri, Kottayam	7:29 AM	Mon, Tue, Wed, Thu, Fri
16302	Venad Express	Thiruvananthapuram Central	Shoranur	Kottayam, Ernakulam, Thrissur	7:50 AM	Daily
22648	Thiruvananthapuram North - Korba Superfast	Thiruvananthapuram North	Korba	Kottayam, Ernakulam, Palakkad, Coimbatore, Salem, Chennai, Vijayawada, Nagpur, Bilaspur	8:17 AM	Mon, Thu
16650	Parasuram Express	Kanyakumari	Mangalore	Kottayam, Ernakulam, Thrissur, Shoranur, Kozhikode, Kannur	8:45 AM	Daily
20360	Sabari Superfast	Thiruvananthapuram Central	Secunderabad	Kottayam, Ernakulam, Thrissur, Palakkad, Coimbatore, Salem, Katpadi, Tirupati, Renigunta, Guntur	9:04 AM	Daily
66303	Ernakulam MEMU	Kollam	Ernakulam Junction	Changanasseri, Kottayam	9:24 AM	Tue, Wed, Thu, Fri, Sat, Sun
16362	Velankanni - Ernakulam Express	Velankanni	Ernakulam Junction	Changanasseri, Kottayam	9:37 AM	Mon, Wed
16364	Velankanni - Ernakulam Express	Velankanni	Ernakulam Junction	Changanasseri, Kottayam	9:38 AM	Fri
12202	Thiruvananthapuram North - Mumbai LTT Garibrath Express	Thiruvananthapuram North	Mumbai Lokamanya Tilak	Kottayam, Ernakulam, Shoranur, Kozhikode, Kannur, Mangalore, Madgaon, Panvel	11:16 AM	Sun, Thu
17422	Kollam - Tirupati Express	Kollam	Tirupati	Kottayam, Ernakulam, Thrissur, Palakkad, Coimbatore, Salem, Katpadi	11:55 AM	Wed, Sat
66308	Ernakulam MEMU	Kollam	Ernakulam Junction	Changanasseri, Kottayam	12:26 PM	Mon, Tue, Thu, Fri, Sat, Sun
16382	Kanyakumari - Pune Express (Jayanti Janatha)	Kanyakumari	Pune	Kottayam, Ernakulam, Thrissur, Palakkad, Coimbatore, Salem, Katpadi, Tirupati, Renigunta, Guntakal, Wadi, Solapur	1:10 PM	Daily
12625	Kerala Express	Thiruvananthapuram Central	New Delhi	Kottayam, Ernakulam, Thrissur, Palakkad, Coimbatore, Salem, Katpadi, Tirupati, Renigunta, Vijayawada, Nagpur, Bhopal, Jhansi, Gwalior, Faridabad	2:26 PM	Daily
12778	Thiruvananthapuram North - SSS Hubbali Superfast	Thiruvananthapuram North	Hubli	Kottayam, Ernakulam, Thrissur, Palakkad, Podanur, Salem, Banaswadi, Tumkur, Davangere, Harihar	2:43 PM	Thu
16562	Yeswanthpur AC Express	Thiruvananthapuram North	Yeswanthpur	Kottayam, Ernakulam, Thrissur, Palakkad, Coimbatore, Salem, KR Puram	2:43 PM	Fri
16382	Kanyakumari - KSR Bengaluru Express (Island Express)	Kanyakumari	KSR Bengaluru	Kottayam, Ernakulam, Thrissur, Palakkad, Coimbatore, Salem, Tirupattur, Bangarapet, KR Puram	3:20 PM	Daily
16329	Nagercoil- Mangalore Amrit Bharat Express	Nagercoil	Mangalore	Kottayam, Ernakulam, Thrissur, Shoranur, Kozhikode, Kannur, Kasargod	3:36 PM	Tue
16310	Ernakulam MEMU Express	Kayankulam	Ernakulam Junction	Changanasseri, Kottayam	3:53 PM	Daily
66316	Kottayam MEMU	Kollam	Kottayam	Changanasseri	4:05 PM	Daily
12082	Thiruvananthapuram - Kannur Jan Shatabdi Express	Thiruvananthapuram Central	Kannur	Kottayam, Ernakulam, Thrissur, Shoranur, Kozhikode	4:54 PM	Sun, Mon, Wed, Thu, Fri
12624	Thiruvananthapuram - Chennai Mail Superfast (Chennai Mail)	Thiruvananthapuram Central	MGR Chennai Central	Kottayam, Ernakulam, Thrissur, Palakkad, Coimbatore, Salem, Katpadi	5:10 PM	Daily
16312	Thiruvananthapuram North - Shri Ganganagar Express	Thiruvananthapuram North	Shri Ganganagar	Kottayam, Ernakulam, Kozhikode, Kannur, Mangalore, Madgaon, Panvel, Surat, Ahmedabad, Jodhpur, Bikaner	5:54 PM	Sat
19259	Bhavnagar Express	Thiruvananthapuram North	Bhavnagar	Kottayam, Ernakulam, Kozhikode, Kannur, Mangalore, Madgaon, Panvel, Surat, Ahmedabad	5:54 PM	Thu
16334	Veraval Express	Thiruvananthapuram Central	Veraval	Kottayam, Ernakulam, Kozhikode, Kannur, Mangalore, Madgaon, Panvel, Surat, Ahmedabad, Rajkot	5:54 PM	Mon
16336	Nagercoil - Gandhidham Express	Nagercoil	Gandhidham	Kottayam, Ernakulam, Kozhikode, Kannur, Mangalore, Madgaon, Panvel, Surat, Ahmedabad	6:14 PM	Tue
12659	Gurudev Superfast	Nagercoil	Shalimar	Kottayam, Ernakulam, Palakkad, Coimbatore, Salem, Katpadi, Tirupati, Renigunta, Vijayawada, Visakhapatnam, Bhubaneswar, Cuttack, Kharagpur, Santragachi	6:22 PM	Sun
16317	Himsagar Express	Kanyakumari	Shri Mata Vaishno Devi Katra	Kottayam, Ernakulam, Palakkad, Coimbatore, Salem, Katpadi, Tirupati, Renigunta, Vijayawada, Nagpur, Bhopal, New Delhi, Rohtak, Ludhiana, Jammu Tawi	6:22 PM	Fri
18502	Visakhapatnam Express	Kollam	Visakhapatnam	Kottayam, Ernakulam, Thrissur, Palakkad, Podanur, Salem, Katpadi, Renigunta, Ongole, Vijayawada	6:27 PM	Wed
16366	Kottayam Express	Nagercoil	Kottayam	Changanasseri	6:49 PM	Daily
12507	Aronai Express	Thiruvananthapuram Central	Silchar	Kottayam, Ernakulam, Palakkad, Coimbatore, Salem, Katpadi, Perambur, Vijayawada, Visakhapatnam, Bhubaneswar, Cuttack, Kharagpur, Malda, Kamakhya, Guwahati, Badarpur	7:06 PM	Tue
12258	Yeshwanthpur Garib Rath Express	Thiruvananthapuram North	Yeshwanthpur	Kottayam, Ernakulam, Thrissur, Palakkad, Coimbatore, Salem, Hosur	7:06 PM	Mon, Wed, Fri
12696	Chennai Superfast	Thiruvananthapuram Central	MGR Chennai Central	Kottayam, Ernakulam, Thrissur, Palakkad, Coimbatore, Salem, Katpadi	7:29 PM	Daily
17042	Charlapalli Amrit Bharat Express	Thiruvananthapuram North	Charlapalli	Kottayam, Ernakulam, Thrissur, Palakkad, Coimbatore, Salem, Katpadi, Renigunta, Ongole, Guntur	7:40 PM	Wed
16313	Antyodaya Express	Thiruvananthapuram North	Mangalore	Kottayam, Ernakulam, Thrissur, Kozhikode, Kannur, Kasargod	7:41 PM	Mon
16304	Vanchinad Express	Thiruvananthapuram Central	Ernakulam Junction	Changanasseri, Kottayam, Tripunithura	8:27 PM	Daily
18568	Visakhapatnam Express	Kollam	Visakhapatnam	Kottayam, Ernakulam, Thrissur, Palakkad, Coimbatore, Salem, Katpadi, Renigunta, Ongole, Vijayawada	8:56 PM	Fri
16327	Madurai Guruvayur Express	Madurai	Guruvayur	Kottayam, Ernakulam, Thrissur	9:06 PM	Daily
16629	Malabar Express	Thiruvananthapuram Central	Mangalore	Kottayam, Ernakulam, Thrissur, Kozhikode, Kannur, Kasargod	9:33 PM	Daily
16310	Ernakulam MEMU	Kollam	Ernakulam Junction	Changanasseri, Kottayam	10:28 PM	Mon, Wed, Thu, Fri, Sat, Sun
16343	Amritha Express	Thiruvananthapuram Central	Rameswaram	Kottayam, Ernakulam, Thrissur, Palakkad, Pollachi, Palani, Madurai	10:50 PM	Daily
16349	Rajya Rani Express	Thiruvananthapuram North	Nilambur	Kottayam, Ernakulam, Thrissur, Shoranur	11:12 PM	Daily
16347	Mangalore Express	Thiruvananthapuram Central	Mangalore	Kottayam, Ernakulam, Thrissur, Shoranur, Kozhikode, Kannur, Kasargod	11:31 PM	Daily

Towards South (Monsoon schedule changes for trains coming via Konkan - From June 15 to Oct 20)
Train Number	Train Name	From	To	Via	Time	Schedule
16333	Veraval - Thiruvananthapuram Express	Veraval	Thiruvananthapuram Central	Kayankulam, Kollam	12:39 AM (Monsoon: 3:47 AM)	Sat
16335	Gandhidham - Nagercoil Express	Gandhidham	Nagercoil	Kayankulam, Kollam, Thiruvananthapuram	12:39 AM (Monsoon: 3:47 AM)	Sun
19260	Bhavnagar - Kochuveli Express	Bhavnagar	Thiruvananthapuram North	Kayankulam, Kollam	12:39 AM (Monsoon: 3:47 AM)	Thu
16348	Mangalore - Thiruvananthapuram Express	Mangalore	Thiruvananthapuram Central	Kayankulam, Kollam	12:53 AM	Daily
16363	Velankanni Express	Ernakulam Junction	Velankanni	Kayankulam, Kollam, Punalur, Tenkasi, Virudunagar, Madurai, Dindigul, Thanjavur, Nagapattinam	1:10 AM	Thu
16344	Amritha Express	Rameswaram	Thiruvananthapuram Central	Kayankulam, Kollam	1:32 AM	Daily
16350	Rajya Rani Express	Nilambur	Thiruvananthapuram North	Kayankulam, Kollam	2:23 AM	Daily
16314	Antyodaya Express	Mangalore	Thiruvananthapuram North	Kayankulam, Kollam	3:39 AM (Monsoon: 1:04 AM)	Wed
17421	Tirupati - Kollam Express	Tirupati	Kollam	Chengannur, Kayankulam	3:58 AM	Wed, Sat
12695	Chennai - Thiruvananthapuram Superfast	MGR Chennai Central	Thiruvananthapuram Central	Kayankulam, Kollam	4:21 AM	Daily
16630	Malabar Express	Mangalore	Thiruvananthapuram Central	Kayankulam, Kollam	4:40 AM	Daily
16630	Pune - Kanyakumari Express (Jayanti Janatha)	Pune	Kanyakumari	Kayankulam, Kollam, Thiruvananthapuram, Nagercoil	5:29 AM	Daily
56311	Kollam Passenger	Kottayam	Kollam	Chengannur, Kayankulam	6:09 AM	Daily
16303	Vanchinad Express	Ernakulam Junction	Thiruvananthapuram Central	Kayankulam, Kollam	6:51 AM	Daily
66307	Kollam MEMU	Ernakulam Junction	Kollam	Chengannur, Kayankulam	7:54 AM	Mon, Tue, Thu, Fri, Sat, Sun
12623	Chennai - Thiruvananthapuram Mail	MGR Chennai Central	Thiruvananthapuram Central	Kayankulam, Kollam	8:13 AM	Daily
16526	Bangalore - Kanyakumari Island Express	KSR Bengaluru	Kanyakumari	Kayankulam, Kollam, Thiruvananthapuram, Nagercoil	8:50 AM	Daily
16328	Guruvayur - Madurai Express	Guruvayur	Madurai	Kayankulam, Kollam, Punalur, Senkottai, Tenkasi, Sivakasi, Virudunagar	10:02 AM	Daily
12257	Yeshwanthpur - Thiruvananthapuram North Garib Rath Express	Yeshwanthpur	Thiruvananthapuram North	Kayankulam, Kollam	10:14 AM	Mon, Wed, Fri
16309	Kayankulam MEMU Express	Ernakulam Junction	Kayankulam	Chengannur, Mavelikara	10:26 AM	Daily
18567	Visakhapatnam - Kollam Express	Visakhapatnam	Kollam	Chengannur, Kayankulam	10:44 AM	Fri
12081	Janshatabdi Express	Kannur	Thiruvananthapuram Central	Kayankulam, Kollam	10:55 AM	Mon, Tue, Thu, Fri, Sat
66327	Kollam MEMU	Ernakulam Junction	Kollam	Chengannur, Kayankulam	11:37 AM	Mon, Tue, Wed, Thu, Fri
17041	Charlapalli - Thiruvananthapuram North Amrit Bharat Express	Charlapalli	Thiruvananthapuram North	Kayankulam, Kollam	11:41 AM	Wed
22647	Korba - Thiruvananthapuram North Superfast	Korba	Thiruvananthapuram North	Kayankulam, Kollam	12:14 PM	Mon, Fri
18501	Visakhapatnam - Kollam Express	Visakhapatnam	Kollam	Chengannur, Kayankulam	12:50 PM	Wed
16361	Velankanni Express	Ernakulam Junction	Velankanni	Kayankulam, Kollam, Punalur, Tenkasi, Virudunagar, Karaikkudi, Nagapattinam	2:21 PM	Mon, Sat
20629	Sabari Superfast	Secunderabad	Thiruvananthapuram Central	Kayankulam, Kollam	2:44 PM	Daily
66304	Kollam MEMU	Ernakulam Junction	Kollam	Chengannur, Kayankulam	3:26 PM	Tue, Wed, Thu, Fri, Sat, Sun
16649	Parasuram Express	Mangalore	Kanyakumari	Kayankulam, Kollam, Thiruvananthapuram, Nagercoil	3:56 PM	Daily
16311	Shri Ganganagar - Thiruvananthapuram North Express	Shri Ganganagar	Thiruvananthapuram North	Kayankulam, Kollam	4:08 PM (Monsoon: 7:06 PM)	Thu
16330	Mangalore - Nagercoil Amrit Bharat Express	Mangalore	Nagercoil	Kayankulam, Kollam, Thiruvananthapuram	4:11 PM	Wed
12660	Gurudev Superfast	Shalimar	Nagercoil	Kayankulam, Kollam, Thiruvananthapuram	4:20 PM	Fri
12201	Mumbai LTT - Thiruvananthapuram North Garib Rath Express	Lokamanya Tilak Terminus	Thiruvananthapuram North	Kayankulam, Kollam	4:43 PM (Monsoon: 7:06 PM)	Tue, Sat
16318	Himsagar Express	Shri Mata Vaishnodevi Katra	Kanyakumari	Kayankulam, Kollam, Thiruvananthapuram, Nagercoil	4:43 PM	Thu
22113	Mumbai LTT - Thiruvananthapuram North Superfast	Lokamanya Tilak Terminus	Thiruvananthapuram North	Kayankulam, Kollam	4:43 PM (Monsoon: 7:06 PM)	Wed, Sun
12508	Aronai Express	Silchar	Thiruvananthapuram Central	Kayankulam, Kollam	5:32 PM	Sun
66315	Kollam MEMU	Kottayam	Kollam	Chengannur, Kayankulam	6:08 PM	Daily
12626	Kerala Express	New Delhi	Thiruvananthapuram Central	Kayankulam, Kollam	6:23 PM	Daily
16301	Venad Express	Shoranur	Thiruvananthapuram Central	Kayankulam, Kollam	6:55 PM	Daily
66321	Kollam MEMU	Ernakulam Junction	Kollam	Chengannur, Kayankulam	8:07 PM	Daily
16792	Palaruvi Express	Palakkad	Tuticorin	Kayankulam, Kollam, Punalur, Sengottai, Tenkasi, Tirunelveli	8:35 PM	Daily

== Proposals for new routes ==
- A line from Tiruvalla to Thakazhi, a village in the Alappuzha district (thus connecting the Kottayam and Alappuzha parallel rail lines) has been proposed.

== See also ==
- Ernakulam–Kottayam–Kollam line
- Trivandrum Central
- Kollam Junction
- Karunagappalli railway station
- Kayamkulam Junction
- Mavelikara railway station
- Chengannur railway station
- Changanasseri railway station
- Kottayam railway station
- Ernakulam Junction
- Ernakulam Town
- Thiruvananthapuram railway division
- Template:Ernakulam–Kottayam–Kayamkulam–Kollam line
