= Changanasseri railway station =

Railway station in Kerala, India

Changanasseri ചങ്ങനാശ്ശേരി
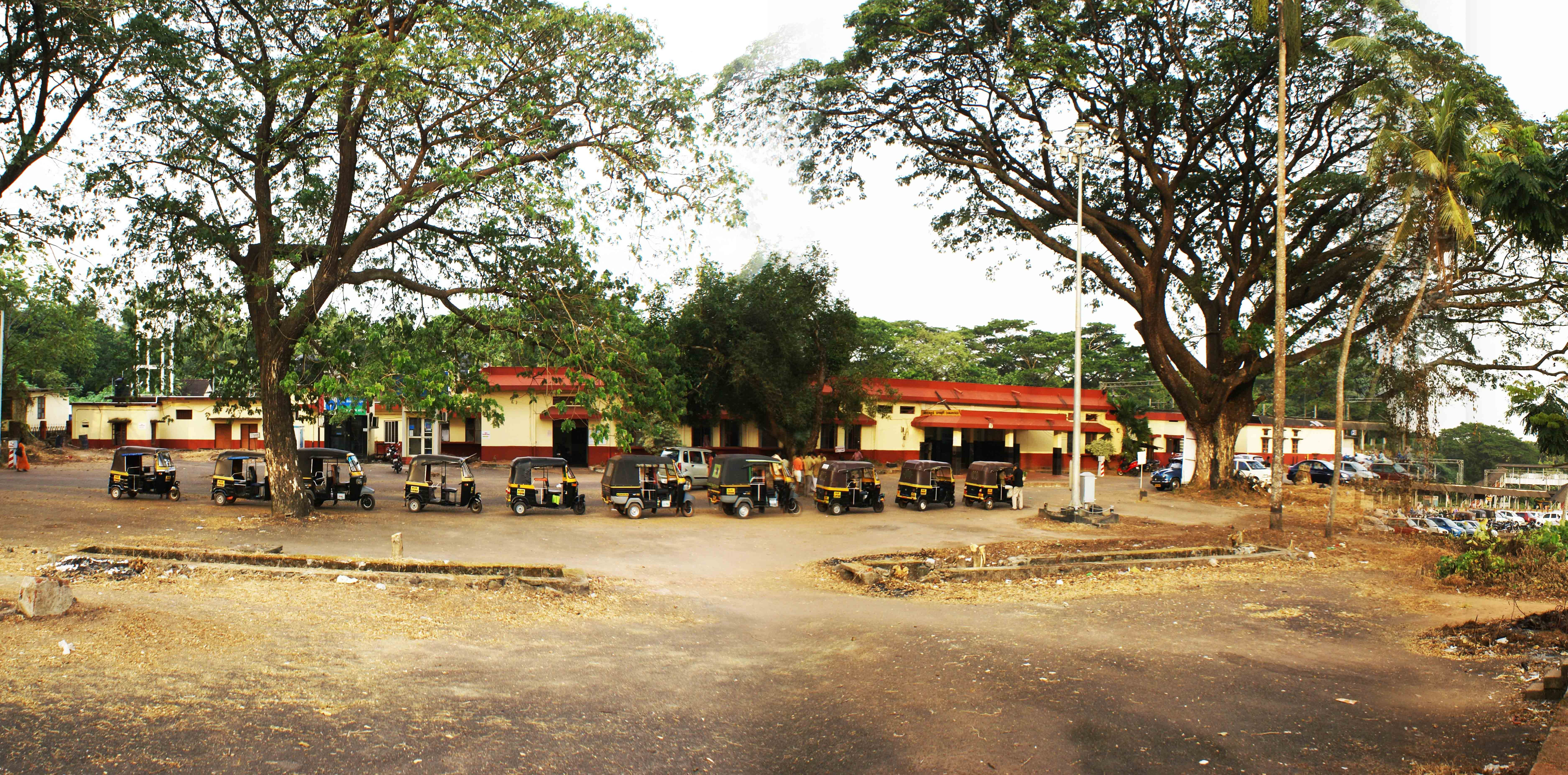
- Exterior of the main station building in 2011

General information
- Location: Railway junction, Changanassery Bypass, Vazhoor road, Changanassery; India
- Coordinates: 9.449000°N 76.548665°E
- Elevation: 6.3 m (21 ft)
- System: Express and Passenger train station
- Owner: Indian Railways
- Operator: Southern Railway zone
- Line: Ernakulam–Kottayam–Kollam line
- Platforms: 4 (3 passenger and 1 goods)
- Tracks: 4

Construction
- Structure type: Standard on-ground station
- Parking: Available
- Accessible: Disabled access

Other information
- Status: Functioning
- Station code: CGY
- Zone(s): Southern Railway zone
- Division(s): Thiruvananthapuram
- Fare zone: Southern Railway zone
- Classification: NSG-4

History
- Opened: 1956; 70 years ago

Services
Preceding station	Indian Railways	Following station
Chingavanam towards	Southern Railway zone Ernakulam–Kottayam–Kayamkulam line	Tiruvalla towards
Route map
Location
- Location within India Location within Kerala

Changanasseri railway station (station code: CGY) is an NSG–4 category Indian railway station in Thiruvananthapuram railway division of the Southern Railway zone. It is the second largest railway station in Kottayam district, Kerala, and is located in the Ernakulam–Kottayam–Kollam line.

== History ==
The first train running from Changanassery railway station was established in 1958. Though Railway traffic was set up at Ernakulam and Trivandrum, these connections were not directly connected. In 1956, the metre-gauge was constructed from Ernakulam to Kottayam. Then in 1958 it was extended from Kottayam to Changanassery and linked with Kollam and Thiruvananthapuram Central. The metre-gauge line from Changanassery was changed to broad gauge and the railway transportation was started in 1976 by Chief minister of Kerala C. Achutha Menon.

== Location ==
Changanasseri Railway station is located 1 km away from Changanassery town. Distances from various public transport stations are given below:

- Changanassery KSRTC Bus stand: 1 km
- Changanassery Old Private Bus stand: 1 km
- Changanassery Perunna Private Bus stand: 1.5 km
- Changanassery SWTD Boat Station: 2.5 km

== Major nearby railway stations ==
The nearest railway station is Tiruvalla railway station.

- Tiruvalla: 8 km
- Chengannur: 17 km
- Kottayam: 18 km
- Mavelikkara: 30 km
- Kayamkulam Junction: 37 km
- Kollam Junction: 58 km
- Ernakulam Town: 78 km

== Significance ==
Changanasseri railway station serves the people of Kottayam, Alappuzha and Idukki districts as it is at the tri-point of Kottayam, Alappuzha, and Pathanamthitta districts, and also has good connectivity to the high-ranges in Idukki. Changanasseri railway station is the nearest rail station to reach famous pilgrimage places like Vazhappally Maha Siva Temple, Erumely, Basilica of St. Mary, Champakulam, St Mary's Metropolitan Cathedral, Changanassery, Syro-Malabar Catholic Archeparchy of Changanassery, and to Kuttanad, Vembanad Lake, Vagamon, Kumily, and Thekkady.

Changanacherry station bagged 299th position among the stations cleanliness ranking by SWACHH RAIL, SWACHH BHARAT Cleanliness assessment of Non-Suburban and Suburban Stations by Ministry of Railways, India. Changanasseri is also an FSSAI's 'Eat Right' certified railway station, awarded for safe food practices in the nation.

== Major trains halting ==
- Nagercoil–Mangaluru Amrit Bharat Express
- Charlapalli – Thiruvananthapuram North Amrit Bharat Express
- TVN-Mumbai LTT Garib Rath Express
- TVN-Yesvantpur Garib Rath Express
- Kannur–Thiruvananthapuram Jan Shatabdi Express
- Palaruvi Express
- Venad Express
- Parasuram Express
- Sabari Express
- TVC-Hazrat Nizamuddin SF Express
- Kanniyakumari-Pune Express
- Island Express
- Kerala Express
- TVC-MGR Chennai Central SF Express
- Madurai-Guruvayur Express
- Malabar Express
- Amritha Express
- TVN-Nilambur Road Rajya Rani Express
- TVC-Mangaluru Central Express
- Vanchinadu Express

== See also ==
- Ernakulam–Kottayam–Kollam line
- Kottayam
- Tiruvalla
- Kayamkulam Junction
