= Ernakulam–Kollam line (via Kottayam and Kayamkulam) =

Kochi-kottayam-kayamkulam line

Ernakulam–Kollam line (via Kottayam)
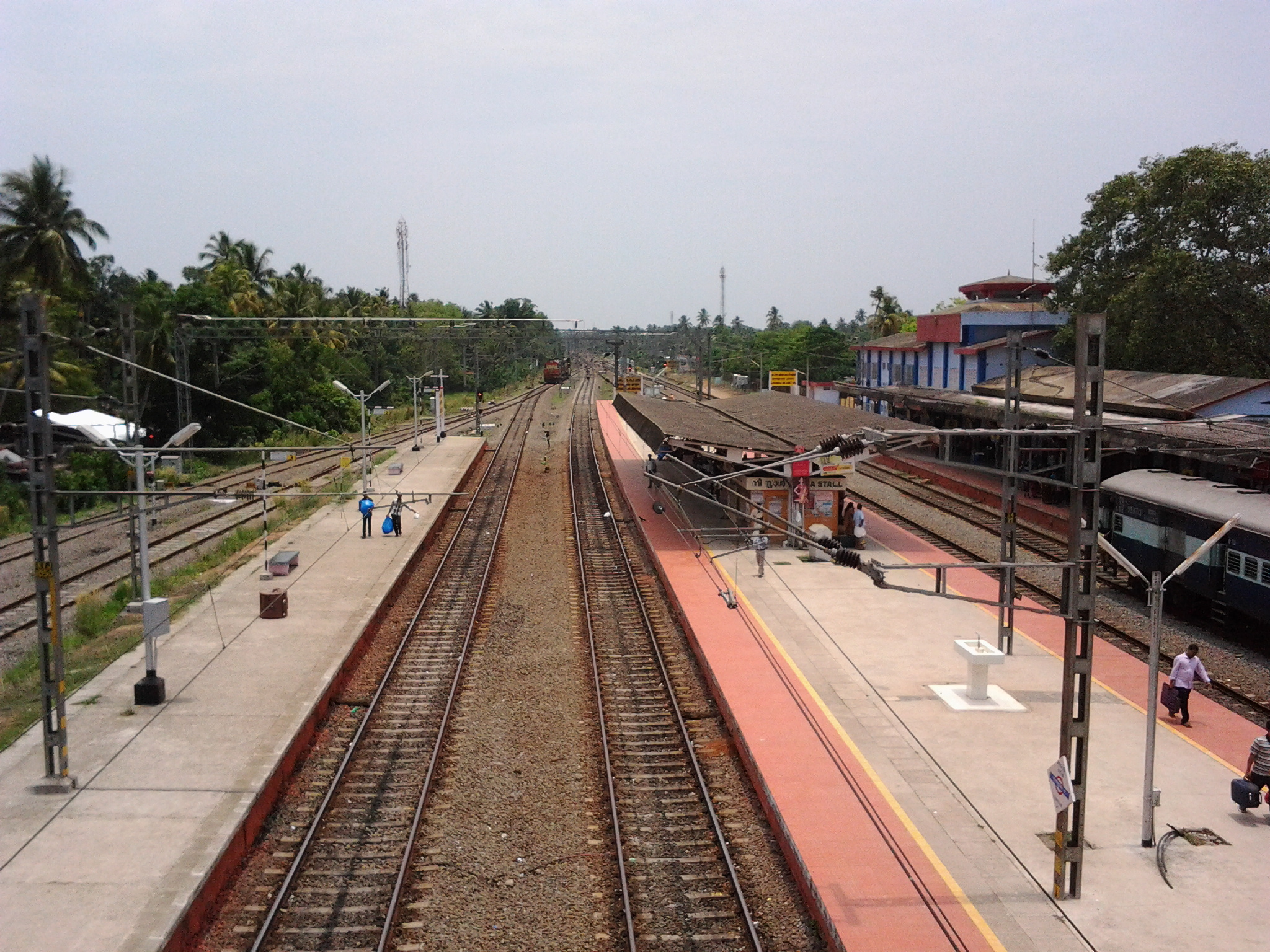
- Ernakulam-Kollam line between platforms 3 and 4 of Kayamkulam Jn.

Overview
- Native name: എറണാകുളം-കൊല്ലം റെയിൽ പാത (കോട്ടയം, കായംകുളം വഴി)
- Status: Operational
- Owner: Indian Railways
- Locale: Kerala
- Termini: Ernakulam Town; Kollam Junction
- Stations: 25
- Website: www.sr.indianrailways.gov.in

Service
- Type: Regional rail Light rail
- Operator: Southern Railway zone

History
- Opened: 6 January 1956; 70 years ago

Technical
- Line length: 156 km (97 mi)
- Number of tracks: 2
- Track gauge: 1,676 mm (5 ft 6 in)
- Loading gauge: 4,725 mm × 3,660 mm (15 ft 6.0 in × 12 ft 0.1 in) (BG)
- Electrification: Fully Electrified. 25 kV 50 Hz AC
- Operating speed: 110 km/h (68 mph)

The Ernakulam–Kollam line (via Kottayam and Kayamkulam) is a railway line which runs through the districts of Ernakulam, Kottayam, Pathanamthitta, Alappuzha and Kollam in Kerala state of India. This railway line starts as a branch line from Ernakulam Town railway station towards Kottayam and joins with the Ernakulam–Kayamkulam coastal line route via Alappuzha at Kayamkulam Junction and leads to Kollam Junction. This line comes under the Thiruvananthapuram railway division of Southern Railway Zone of Indian Railways. The line has a total distance of 156 km (97 mi). The Ernakulam Town/Ernakulam Junction - Kottayam section opened in 1956-57 and Kottayam - Kollam section in 1957-1958.

== History ==
Train service began in Travancore, erstwhile Kerala state on 26 November 1904, with the completion of the Kollam–Sengottai branch line, which was a part of Kollam - Chennai meter gauge route. On 4 November 1931, the Thiruvananthapuram Central Railway Station was launched. In 1956 during the formation of Kerala, the total length of railway line in the State was 745 km. Ernakulam and Kollam were not connected by rail then. The Ernakulam - Kottayam and Kottayam - Kollam railway lines were completed in 1956 and 1958 respectively. In December 1971, a Rs.13.59 crore project was established to convert the Thiruvananthapuram - Ernakulam line (220 km) from meter gauge to broad gauge was sanctioned. The work was completed in 1976.

== Track doubling and other developments ==
The Ernakulam–Kottayam–Kayamkulam–Kollam line is fully electrified and doubled.

The Kayamkulam -Kollam (41 km) stretch got double tracks in 1996.

The doubling works of Ernakulam–Kottayam–Kayamkulam line received the green light sanction back in 2001. After multiple delays, doubling works were systematically completed and commissioned in all and the last stretches from the Ettumanoor to Chingavanam section, which was completed in May 2022. The Railway Chief Zone Safety Commissioner Abhay Kumar Rai conducted the safety inspection of this stretch on 23 May 2022 and this was ultimately commissioned on 29 May 2022. Thus, with the completion of doubling of the entire Ernakulam-Kottayam-Kayankulam line, it is expected that there would be a significant reduction in the late running of trains on this stretch, as well as the introduction of new trains.

Renovation works of railway stations on this stretch as part of the doubling works have mostly been completed, with introduction of new facilities to passengers. Recently Piravam Road, Vaikom Road, Kuruppanthara, Ettumanur, Chingavanam, Changanacherry, Tiruvalla, Chengannur were renovated as part of track doubling with either construction of new station buildings or renovation of platforms or new foot overbridges etc. Construction activities for relocating Ettumanur station to the middle of Neendoor and Athirampuzha roads are almost done. The Kottayam station, which is the main station along the route has also been renovated during progress of rail doubling works.

The iconic tunnels between Chingavanam and Kottayam (near Kottayam station) have been used as shunting lines after track doubling. Although the initial plan was to build another tunnel, this idea was dropped after the topography was found to be unsuitable. Subsequently, a new double track has been made after removing earth for one kilometre on the side of the existing tunnels and railway overbridges have been deployed above the tracks. The existing tunnels will, in future, be used only for shunting as passenger traffic will be redirected to the new tracks.

== Stations ==
There are 25 railway stations along the stretch. The major stations are Ernakulam Town, Kottayam, Chengannur, Tiruvalla, Changanacherry, Tripunithura, Mavelikara, Kayamkulam Junction, karunagappalli, and Kollam Junction. The details of the railway stations is shown below.

Sl. No	Station Name	Malayalam Name	Code	District	Category	Entrances	Platforms
1.	Ernakulam Town	എറണാകുളം ടൗൺ	ERN	Ernakulam	NSG2	2	2
2.	Tripunithura	തൃപ്പൂണിത്തുറ	TRTR	Ernakulam	NSG5	1	2
3.	Chottanikkara Road (Kurikad)	ചോറ്റാനിക്കര റോഡ്	KFE	Ernakulam	HG3	1	2
4.	Mulanturutti	മുളന്തുരുത്തി	MNTT	Ernakulam	NSG6	1	2
5.	Kanjiramittam	കാഞ്ഞിരമിറ്റം	KPTM	Ernakulam	HG2	1	2
6.	Piravam Road	പിറവം റോഡ്	PVRD	Kottayam	NSG5	1	3
7.	Vaikom Road (Appanchira)	വൈക്കം റോഡ്	VARD	Kottayam	NSG6	1	3
8.	Kaduturutti Halt	കടുത്തുരുത്തി	KDTY	Kottayam	HG3	1	2
9.	Kuruppanthara	കുറുപ്പന്തറ	KRPP	Kottayam	NSG6	1	2
10.	Ettumanur	ഏറ്റുമാനൂർ	ETM	Kottayam	NSG6	1	4
11.	Kumaranallur	കുമാരനല്ലൂർ	KFQ	Kottayam	HG3	1	1
12.	Kottayam	കോട്ടയം	KTYM	Kottayam	NSG3	2	6
13.	Chingavanam	ചിങ്ങവനം	CGV	Kottayam	NSG6	1	3
14.	Changanasseri	ചങ്ങനാശ്ശേരി	CGY	Kottayam	NSG4	1	4
15.	Tiruvalla	തിരുവല്ലാ	TRVL	Pathanam thitta	NSG3	1	4
16.	Chengannur	ചെങ്ങന്നൂർ	CNGR	Alappuzha	NSG3	1	3
17.	Cheriyanad	ചെറിയനാട്	CYN	Alappuzha	NSG6	1	2
18.	Mavelikara	മാവേലിക്കര	MVLK	Alappuzha	NSG5	1	3
19.	Kayamkulam Junction	കായംകുളം	KYJ	Alappuzha	NSG3	1	5
20.	Ochira	ഓച്ചിറ	OCR	Kollam	NSG6	1	2
21.	Karunagappally	കരുനാഗപ്പള്ളി	KPY	Kollam	NSG4	1	3
22.	Sasthamkotta	ശാസ്താംകോട്ട	STKT	Kollam	NSG5	1	2
23.	Munrothuruthu	മൺറോത്തുരുത്ത്	MQO	Kollam	HG2	1	2
24.	Perinad	പെരിനാട്	PRND	Kollam	NSG6	1	2
25.	Kollam Junction	കൊല്ലം ജംഗ്‌ഷൻ	QLN	Kollam	NSG2	2	6

**Note:-

1. Stations written in bold letters - Stations generating Rs. 5,00,00,000(Rs. 5 Crore) or more in a financial year [Based on data of 2022-2023].
2. The criteria for categorization of stations have now been revised to include footfalls at the station. The stations have been clubbed into three groups -- Non-suburban (NS), Suburban (S) and Halt (H). These groups have further been put in grades ranging from NSG 1-6, SG 1-3 and HG 1-3, respectively

== Major trains ==
The major trains running along this route:

- Thiruvananthapuram - Kasaragod Vande Bharat Express.
- Nagercoil–Mangaluru Amrit Bharat Express
- Charlapalli – Thiruvananthapuram North Amrit Bharat Express
- Kochuveli - Lokmanya Tilak Garib Rath Express.
- Kochuveli - Yesvantpur Garib Rath Express.
- Thiruvananthapuram - Kannur Jan Shatabdi Express.
- Kochuveli - Bengaluru Humsafar Express.

Express trains like New Delhi - Thiruvananthapuram Kerala Superfast Express, Kanyakumari - Dibrugarh Vivek Superfast Express (longest running train in India), Himsagar Express, Kanyakumari–Pune Express, Amritha Express, Palaruvi Express, Malabar Express, Parasuram Express, Rajya Rani Express, Venad Express, Ernakulam - Velankanni express, Kollam–Tirupati Express etc run along through this route.

== Significance ==
This line has significant role in connecting people to various social, economic, political and religious centers of middle part of Kerala. The railway stations at Chengannur, Kottayam and Tiruvalla act as the reception centers for people from various parts of country to the famous Hindu pilgrim center Sabarimala. The Chengannur station has been declared as the "Gateway of Sabarimala" by Indian Railways in 2009. During Sabarimala pilgrim (Mandala) season, state transport buses (KSRTC) operate from these stations. Some of the major pilgrim centers and the nearest railway stations are shown below.

Station	Major Pilgrim centers
Chottanikkara Road	Chottanikkara Temple
Mulanthurutti	Mulanthuruthy Marthoman Cathedral, Chottanikkara Temple
Piravam Road	St. Mary's Orthodox Syrian Cathedral, Piravom (Rajadhiraja pally), Pazhoor Perumthrikkovil Temple, Karavelloor Mahadeva Temple, Desadhipan Amarkkulam Sreekrishna Swamy Temple, Mulakulam Mar Yohanon Ihidiyo Orthodox Syrian Church
Vaikom Road	Vaikom Mahadeva Temple
Kaduthuruthy	St. Mary's Knanaya Valiyapally, St. Mary's Syro Malabar Forane Church Kaduthuruthy
Ettumanur	Ettumanoor Mahadeva temple, St. Mary's Forane Church-Athirampuzha (Pilgrim centre of St.Sebastian), Major Archiepiscopal Marth Mariam Archdeacon Church, Kuravilangad, St. Mary's Church Kudamaloor, St. Alphonsa Shrine Bharananganam
Kottayam	Thirunakkara Sree Mahadevar Temple, Sabarimala Temple (95 km), Panachikkadu Temple (12 km), Manarcad Marth Mariam Cathedral (10 km) St. George Orthodox Church, Puthupally (10 km), Thazhathangady Juma Mosque, Orthodox Theological Seminary, Kottayam (Old Seminary), Devalokam Catholicate Palace
Changancherry	Vazhappally Maha Siva Temple, Sabarimala Temple (100 km), Thrikodithanam Mahavishnu Temple, St. Mary's Church-Parel, Perunna Subrahmanya Swami Temple, Kavil Bhagavathy Temple, Panachikkadu Temple, Neelamperoor Palli Bhagavathi Temple, Anikkattilammakshethram
Tiruvalla	Sabarimala Temple (92 km), Parumala Church(Pigrim centre of St. Gregorios) (16 km), Chakkulathukavu Temple, St. George Forane Church-Edathua, Sreevallabha Temple, St. Marys's Valiyapally- Niranam (Founded by St. Thomas in AD 54), St. George Orthodox Church-Paliakkara (3.5 km)
Chengannur	Sabarimala Temple (90 km), ThiruChengannur Old Syrian Church, Chengannur Mahadeva Temple, Pandalam, Aranmula Parthasarathy Temple, Parumala Church, Maramon
Mavelikara	Chettikulangara Sree Bhagavathi temple, Kandiyoor Sree Mahadeva Temple
Ochira	Oachira ParaBrahma Temple
Karunagappally	Amritapuri Ashram
Sasthamkotta	St. Mary's Orthodox Syrian Church-West Kallada(Mar Anthrayos Pilgrim Center), Mount Horeb Ashramam
Munrothuruthu (Munroe Island)	Dutch Church (built in Dutch Church)

Tourism/Others

Kottayam is the nearest railway station which caters to famous tourist destinations like Kumarakom, Thekkady, Vagamon and other tourism destinations in Idukki district. The Changanacherry Railway Station acts as a gateway to Kuttanad and to tourist spots of Idukki. Hill Palace, Infopark-Kochi, various industries like KEL, FACT etc. are situated in proximity to Tripunithura railway station.

Sasthamkotta railway station is near scenic Sasthamcotta lake. Munrothuruthu railway station and Perinad railway station is near to Munroe islands and Sambranikodi island situated in Ashtamudi lake which is a famous tourist destination for canoe tour, bird watching, nature walks and photography.

Connection to Kochi City Metro

The Tripunithura metro station, the terminal metro station of Kochi metro was inaugurated by the Prime Minister Narendra Modi on 6 March 2024. This terminal metro station is located in close proximity to the Tripunithura railway station. The launch of the terminal is a good news for Kochi city-bound rail passengers from Kayamkulam–Kottayam–Ernakulam line who face delays because of the frequent halting of trains near or at the Tripunithura railway station as it is located close enough for them to switch over to the metro.

== Future plans ==
Various plans are in consideration to connect the line to various regions of middle Kerala.

- New lines from Chengannur: 1) A line connecting Chengannur to Pamba (nearest point of Sabarimala) via Ranni is waiting for approval. This route is now under active consideration as a sky rail project. 2) A link to Erumeli-Punalur line, a proposed extension of Sabari line via Adoor, Pandalam.
- Ettumanoor – Pala Sabari Link line : A 15 km Ettumanoor – Pala new BG line is estimated by Kerala Rail Development Corporation (KRDCL) which connects Ettumanoor to proposed Pala station as part of the proposed Angamaly-Erumeli Sabari railway line. This line is expected to be a cost-effective link that will function as an outer ring rail for Kochi.
- Suburban Line: A suburban transit system is proposed between Thiruvananthapuram and Chengannur to cater to huge commuter transportation needs and introducing more trains like DEMU / MEMU. This project is under consideration of Kerala Rail Development Corporation (KRDCL) and a DPR is prepared by Mumbai Rail Vikas Corporation with an estimated cost Rs. 1,836 Crores.
- New lines from Tiruvalla: A line from Tiruvalla to Thakazhi, a village in Alappuzha district (thus connecting the Ernakulam–Kottayam–Kayamkulam line and Ernakulam-Alappuzha-Kayamkulam parallel rail lines) has been proposed. In 2011 - 12 railway budget a Tiruvalla - Ranni - Pampa Railway line was proposed. If implemented, it may open up a Alappuzha - Tiruvalla - Ranni - Punalur - Tuticorin Corridor. Now these projects are not in active consideration and are dropped.
- Earlier there was a proposal for a broad gauge line between Kottayam and Madurai via Idukki and Theni. This line was proposed to implement rail connectivity to places in Idukki, Cumbam, Theni etc. and to promote transportation of agricultural, raw materials and other freight traffic between Tamil Nadu and Kerala. Now this project is not in active consideration and are dropped.

However the Government of Kerala is now focusing on the alignment for the semi high speed rail corridor from Kochuveli to Kasaragod (K-Rail Silver Line), which expects minimal land acquisition, faster means of travel from Thiruvananthapuram to Kasaragod under KRDCL.

== See also ==
- Ernakulam–Kayamkulam coastal line
- Kollam–Sengottai branch line
- Shoranur–Cochin Harbour section
- Thiruvananthapuram railway division
