= Narianganam =

Village in Kottayam District, Kerala, India

Coordinates: 9.7263°N 76.7393°E

Narianganam is a town in the Kottayam district of state of Kerala, India. It is 9 km northwest of the town of Pala. The nearest railway station ins Kottayam Railway Station, and the nearest airport is Cochin International Airport.
