= KLAD =

KLAD may refer to:

- KLAD (AM), a radio station (960 AM) licensed to Klamath Falls, Oregon, United States
- KLAD-FM, a radio station (92.5 FM) licensed to Klamath Falls, Oregon, United States
- KLAD, the Indian Railways station code for Kalanad railway station, Kerala, India
