= KFE =

KFE or kfe may refer to:

- KFE, the IATA code for Fortescue Dave Forrest Airport, Western Australia
- KFE, the Indian Railways station code for Chottanikkara Road railway station, Ernakulam District, Kerala, India
- kfe, the ISO 639-3 code for Kota language (India), Nilgiri Hills, India
