= Chottanikkara =

- Town
- West Nada of the Chottanikkara Temple in 2024

- Location in Kerala, India Chottanikkara (India)
- Coordinates: 9.933°N 76.391°E
- Country: India
- State: Kerala
- District: Ernakulam

Government
  - Type: Panchayat
  - Body: Chottanikkara Grama Panchayat
- Demonym: Chottanikarakaran (Masculine)/ Chottanikarakari (Feminine)

Languages
  - Official: Malayalam, English
- Time zone: UTC+5:30 (IST)
- PIN: 682312
- Vehicle registration: KL-39
- Nearest city: Kochi

Chottanikkara is a temple town and a southern suburb of the city of Kochi, Kerala, India. In local administration, it is a panchayat which consists of Chottanikkara, Kanayannur, Eruvely, Kureekkad, Vattukkunnu, Palace Square and Kottayathupara villages. Chottanikkara is also a part of the urban agglomeration of the City of Kochi.

The Chottanikkara temple is in the town. In 2013 the Chottanikkara Grama Panchayat was selected as one of the best gram panchayats in the state by the Union Panchayati Raj Ministry.
