= Vaikom Road railway station =

Railway station in Kerala, India

Vaikom Road

General information
- Location: Appanchira, Kaduthuruthy, Kottayam, Kerala; India
- Coordinates: 9.778204°N 76.47438°E
- System: Regional rail, Light rail & Commuter rail station
- Owner: Indian Railways
- Operator: Southern Railway zone
- Line: Ernakulam–Kottayam–Kollam line
- Platforms: 3
- Tracks: 4

Construction
- Structure type: At–grade
- Parking: Available

Other information
- Status: Functioning
- Station code: VARD
- Zone(s): Southern Railway zone
- Division(s): Thiruvananthapuram
- Fare zone: Indian Railways

History
- Opened: 1956; 70 years ago
Location
- Location within India Location within Kerala

Vaikom Road railway station (station code: VARD) is an NSG–6 category Indian railway station in Thiruvananthapuram railway division of Southern Railway zone. It is a railway station in Kottayam district, Kerala and falls under the Thiruvananthapuram railway division of the Southern Railway zone, Indian Railways.

It is one of the few railway stations in between Kottayam and Ernakulam where most of the long-distance trains halt for at least one minute.
