= Kollam–Tirupati Express =

Express train belonging to South central Railway zone

Overview
- Service type: Express
- Locale: Andhra Pradesh, Tamilnadu & Kerala
- First service: March 12, 2024; 2 years ago
- Current operator: South Coast Railway zone

Route
- Termini: Kollam(QLN); Tirupati (TPTY)
- Stops: 17
- Distance travelled: 828.7 km (515 mi)
- Average journey time: 15 hours 40 minutes
- Service frequency: biweekly
- Train number: 17421 / 17422

On-board services
- Classes: AC 2 tier, AC 3 tier, sleeper 3 tier, unreserved
- Seating arrangements: Yes
- Sleeping arrangements: Yes
- Catering facilities: Yes

Technical
- Rolling stock: LHB coach
- Track gauge: 5 ft 6 in (1,676 mm) broad gauge
- Operating speed: 55 km/h (34 mph) average including halts

The Kollam–Tirupati Express is an Express train belonging to South Coast Railway zone that runs between Kollam in Kerala and Tirupati in Andhra Pradesh in India. The service was temporarily operated as special train before converting it as a permanent train on a biweekly basis in August 2023. On 12 March 2024, Prime Minister Narendra Modi virtually flagged off the inaugural run of Kollam–Tirupati Express.

== Overview ==
The train departs from Tirupati on Tuesdays and Fridays at 2.40 pm. It will reach Kollam at 6.20 am the next day, travelling through the Salem-Palakkad-Ernakulam-Kottayam-Tiruvalla route. On Wednesdays and Saturdays, the return journey will depart Kollam at 10 am for. The next day's scheduled arrival time in Tirupati is 3.20 am.

== Coach composition ==
The train has 18 bogies comprising two A/C two-tier, five A/C three-tier, seven sleeper class, two unreserved general coaches and 2 Seating cum Luggage Rakes. (Note: The coach composition is subject to change.)

- 2 AC II tier
- 5 AC III tier
- 7 sleeper class
- 2 general compartments
- 2 SLR compartments

== Major halts ==
Kollam Junction → Chengannur → Kottayam → Ernakulam Town → Thrissur → Palakkad Junction → Coimbatore Junction → Erode Junction → Salem Junction → Katpadi Junction → Chittoor → Tirupati

== See also ==
- Kollam–Visakhapatnam Express
- Kollam-Chennai Egmore Express
- Ananthapuri Express
- Kollam–Thiruvananthapuram trunk line
- Shoranur–Cochin Harbour section
