= Ettumanur railway station =

Railway station in Kerala, India

Ettumanur

General information
- Location: Ettumanoor, Kottayam, Kerala; India
- Coordinates: 9.674996899411788°N 76.54600964054924°E
- System: Regional rail, Light rail & Commuter rail station
- Owner: Indian Railways
- Operator: Southern Railway zone
- Line: Ernakulam–Kottayam–Kollam line
- Platforms: 3
- Tracks: 4

Construction
- Structure type: At–grade
- Parking: Available

Other information
- Status: Functioning
- Station code: ETM
- Zone(s): Southern Railway zone
- Division(s): Thiruvananthapuram railway division
- Fare zone: Indian Railways

History
- Opened: 1956; 70 years ago
Location
- Location within India Location within Kerala

Ettumanur railway station (station code: ETM) is an NSG–5 category Indian railway station in Thiruvananthapuram railway division of Southern Railway zone. It is a railway station in Kottayam district, Kerala and falls under the Thiruvananthapuram railway division of the Southern Railway zone, Indian Railways.
