= Kureekkad =

- Town
- Location in Kerala, India Kureekkad (India)
- Coordinates: 9°55′0″N 76°22′0″E
- Country: India
- State: Kerala
- District: Ernakulam

Population (2001)
  - Total: 9,730

Languages
  - Official: Malayalam, English
- Time zone: UTC+5:30 (IST)

Kureekkad is a census town in Ernakulam district in the Indian state of Kerala. It is the gateway to two of the many suburbs of Kochi, Chottanikkara and Kandanad.

== Demographics ==
As of 2001 India census, Kureekkad had a population of 9730. Males constitute 49% of the population and females 51%. Kureekkad has an average literacy rate of 86%, higher than the national average of 59.5%: male literacy is 87%, and female literacy is 85%. In Kureekkad, 10% of the population is under 6 years of age.
