= Chengannur railway station =

3rd main station in alleppy

Chengannur
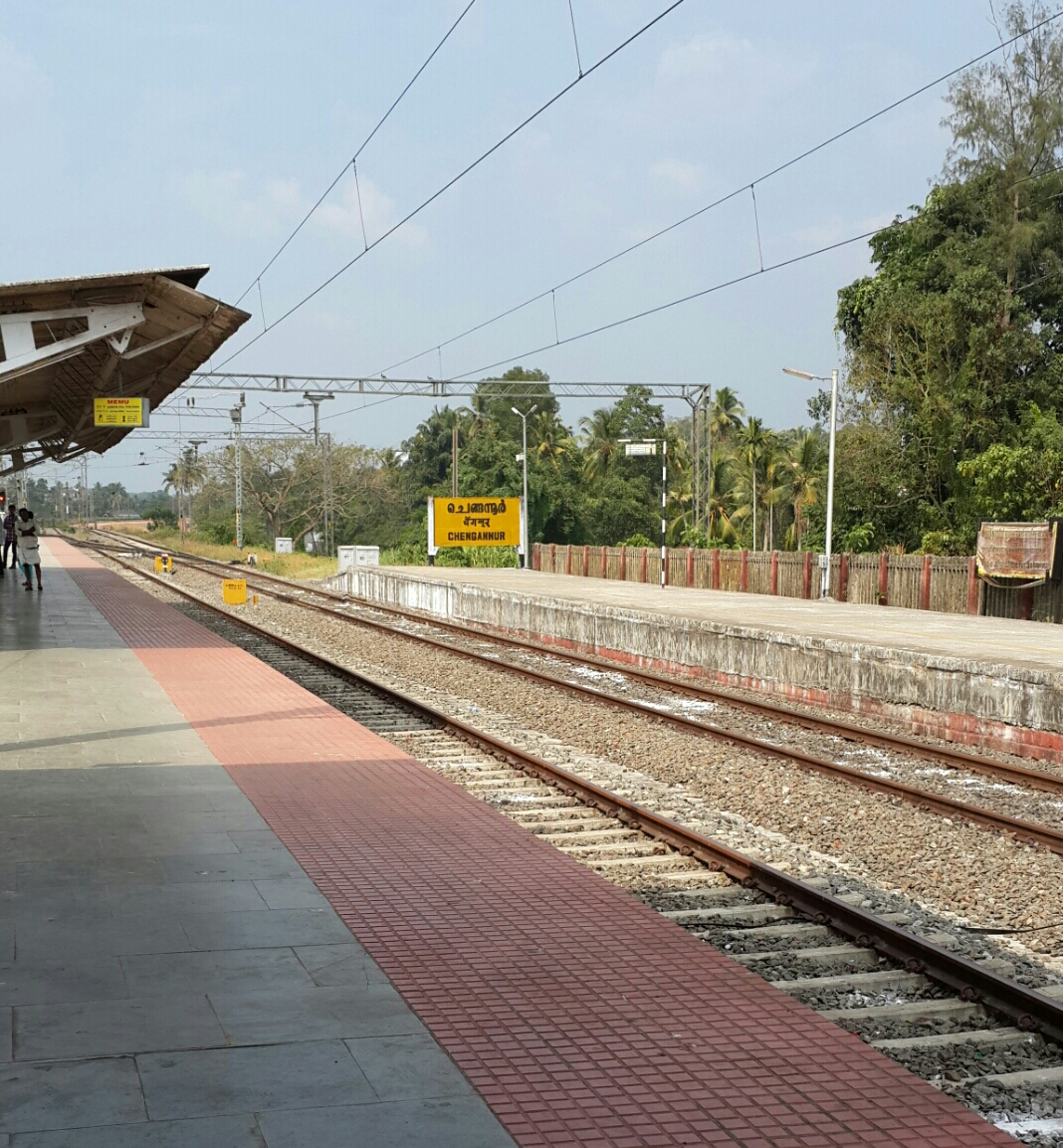
- View of 1st(right) and 2nd(left)platform of Chengannur railway station

General information
- Location: SH10, Chengannur, Alappuzha District, Kerala, India
- Coordinates: 9°19′10″N 76°36′30″E
- Elevation: 6 metres (20 ft)
- System: Indian Railway Station
- Owner: Indian Railways
- Line: Ernakulam–Kottayam–Kollam line
- Platforms: 3
- Tracks: 5
- Connections: Private bus stand, KSRTC bus depot, Autorickshaw stand, Taxi stand

Construction
- Parking: Available

Other information
- Status: Active
- Station code: CNGR
- Fare zone: Southern Railway zone

History
- Opened: 1958; 68 years ago

Services
KSRTC Bus are available in the compound of Station to Sabarimala During Season. Also Private Bus Stand is opp. Of Railway station [To Mavelikara, Kollam, Pathanamthitta]
Route map
Location

Chengannur railway station (station code: CNGR) is an NSG–3 category Indian railway station in Thiruvananthapuram railway division of Southern Railway zone. It is located in Alappuzha district of Kerala. It is one of the busiest stations in the Kottayam-Kollam line, primarily due to the Sabarimala pilgrims. Chengannur railway station mainly serves the people of Alappuzha and Pathanamthitta districts.

It is the 11th most Revenue generating railway station in the state of Keralam and the most Revenue generating railway station in the district of Alappuzha on the basis of Originating passenger revenue (2025-26 Financial Year). Revenue - ₹80 Core

== History ==
Chengannur rail link came into existence in 1958 when Ernakulam–Kottayam metre-gauge railway line was extended to Kollam Junction. The railway line between Trivandrum Central and Ernakulam Junction via Kottayam was converted to broad gauge in 1976.

== Significance ==
Chengannur railway station is the nearest rail station to reach famous pilgrimage places like Sabarimala, Pandalam, Aranmula Parthasarathy Temple, Parumala Church, Maramon and Manjinikkara Monastery .It is also the nearest railway station of 4 of the 5 Pancha Pandava Temples and Pandavanpara. The railway station has been declared as 'Gateway of Sabarimala' by Indian Railways in 2009. It serves the people of 4 districts - Alappuzha, Kollam, Pathanamthitta and Kottayam. The proposed Sabari Airport Cheruvally, Erumeli is 36 km from the station and hence Chengannur would be the nearest railway station to the proposed Sabari Airport Cheruvally.

== Major Trains Halting at Chengannur ==
- Thiruvananthapuram - Kasaragod Vande Bharat Express.
- Nagercoil–Mangaluru Amrit Bharat Express
- Charlapalli – Thiruvananthapuram North Amrit Bharat Express
- RAMESWARAM -THIRUVANANTHAPURAM AMRITHA EXPRESS
- THIRUVANANTHAPURAM -CHENNAI SUPERFAST
- VELANKANNI- ERANAMKULAM EXPRESS
- KANYAKUMARI- PUNE JAYANTHI JANATHA EXPRESS
- VIVEK SUPERFAST EXPRESS
- BANGLORE -KANYAKUMARI ISLAND EXPRESS
- NAGERCOIL SHALIMAR EXPRESS
- THIRUVANANTHAPURAM CHENNAI SUPERFAST MAIL
- TUTICORIN - PALAKKAD PALARUVI EXPRESS
- LTT -KOCHUVELI GARIB RATH
- YESWANTHPUR -KOCHUVELI GARIB RATH SUPERFAST EXPRESS
- VISAKHAPATNAM- KOLLAM JUNCTION TWICE WEEKLY EXPRESS
- THIRUPATHI -KOLLAM EXPRESS
- KOCHUVELI -NILAMBUR ROAD RAJYARANI EXPRESS
- THIRUVANANTHAPURAM -VERAVAL JUNCTION EXPRESS
- NAGERCOIL- GANDHIDHAM JUNCTION express
- HUBBALLI KOCHUVELI EXPRESS
- SMVT BANGLORE KOCHUVELI HUMSAFAR EXPRESS
- VENAD EXPRESS
- VANCHINAD EXPRESS
- MAVELI EXPRESS
- MALABAR EXPRESS
- PARASURAM EXPRESS
- HIMSAGAR EXPRESS
- THIRUVANANTHAPURAM SECUNDARABAD SHABARI EXPRESS
- THIRUVANANTHAPURAM SILCHAR ARONAI SUPERFAST EXPRESS
- THIRUVANANTHAPURAM NEW DELHI KERALA EXPRESS.

== Facilities ==
- Cloak room
- Railway Retiring Rooms
- IRCTC restaurant
- Wi-Fi connectivity
- Computerised Reservation counter
- Information counter
- Foot over bridge
- Subway
- Escalator
- Lift (at platform no: 1)
- 2nd class waiting room at Platform no: 1
- AC waiting room - Paid (Rs. 30 per hour) at Platform Number 1
- Shelters for Sabarimala pilgrims
- Prepaid auto – taxi counter
- Prepaid vehicle parking area
- 24 hrs KSRTC bus to Pamba during Sabarimala Pilgrim Season and also on 1st & last days of every Malayalam month.

== Future expansion plans ==
- A new line linking Chengannur with Thiruvananthapuram Central via Pandalam, Kottarakkara Kilimanoor and Nedumangad was proposed as parallel line towards Thiruvananthapuram for the Ernakulam–Kollam line (via Kottayam and Kayamkulam).
- A sub-urban service connecting Chengannur to Trivandrum was under consideration.
- New elevated rail line between Chengannur and Pamba : An elevated rail line that can take Sabarimala pilgrims from Chengannur to Pampa in around 40 minutes is proposed and under discussion. With the railway ministry giving green signal for the 60 km project’s final location survey, a hassle-free journey through the scenic forest could become a reality in a few years. The proposed railway line is likely to pass through places including Chengannur municipal council, Mallapuzhassery, Aranmula, Kozhencherry, Cherukol, Vadasserikara, Ranni, Keekozhoor, Seethathode, Athikkayam and Perunad.

== See also ==
- Ernakulam–Kottayam–Kollam line
- Trivandrum Central
- Kollam Junction
- Karunagappalli
- Kayamkulam Junction
- Mavelikara railway station
- Tiruvalla railway station
- Changanasseri railway station
- Ettumanur railway station
- Kottayam railway station
- Ernakulam Junction
- Ernakulam Town
- Thiruvananthapuram railway division
- Template:Ernakulam–Kottayam–Kayamkulam–Kollam line
