= Kalanad railway station =

Railway station in Kerala, India

Kalanad

General information
- Location: India
- Coordinates: 12.4676°N 74.9985°E
- System: Regional rail and Light rail station

Other information
- Status: Functioning
- Station code: KLAD
- Zone(s): Southern Railway zone
- Division(s): Palakkad
Route map
- Sources
Location
- Location within India Location within Kerala

Kalanad railway station is a major railway station serving the town of Kasaragod in the Kasaragod District of Kerala, India. It lies in the Shoranur–Mangalore section of the Southern Railways. Trains halting at the station connect the town to prominent cities in India such as Thiruvananthapuram, Kochi, Chennai, Kollam, Bangalore, Kozhikode, Coimbatore, Mangalore, Mysore and so forth.
