= Chingavanam =

- suburb
- Country: India
- State: Kerala
- District: Kottayam

Government
  - Type: Municipality
  - Body: Kottayam municipality

Languages
  - Official: Malayalam, English
- Time zone: UTC+5:30 (IST)
- Postal code: 686531
- Vehicle registration: KL- 05

Chingavanam is a suburb of Kottayam city between Kottayam and Changanassery in Kottayam district of Kerala state, India.

== History ==
Before the 11th century, Chingavanam was one of the 28 Karas of Nattakom area which was under the ruling of Munjunaadu Dynasty. In 1103AD, Ilayaraja Vimbileeswaran of Thekkumkur Dynasty conquered Munjunad and Nattakom area became under Thekkumkur ruling.

== Location ==
Chingavanam is part of the Kottayam Municipality, Kottayam District, between Kottayam and Changanacherry about 9 km from each.

== Notable people ==
- Pallom Madhavan, Kadhakali musician
- V. I. Suku, principal of Thrippunithura RLV College of Music and Fine Arts
