= Mavelikara railway station =

Railway station in Kerala, India

Mavelikara
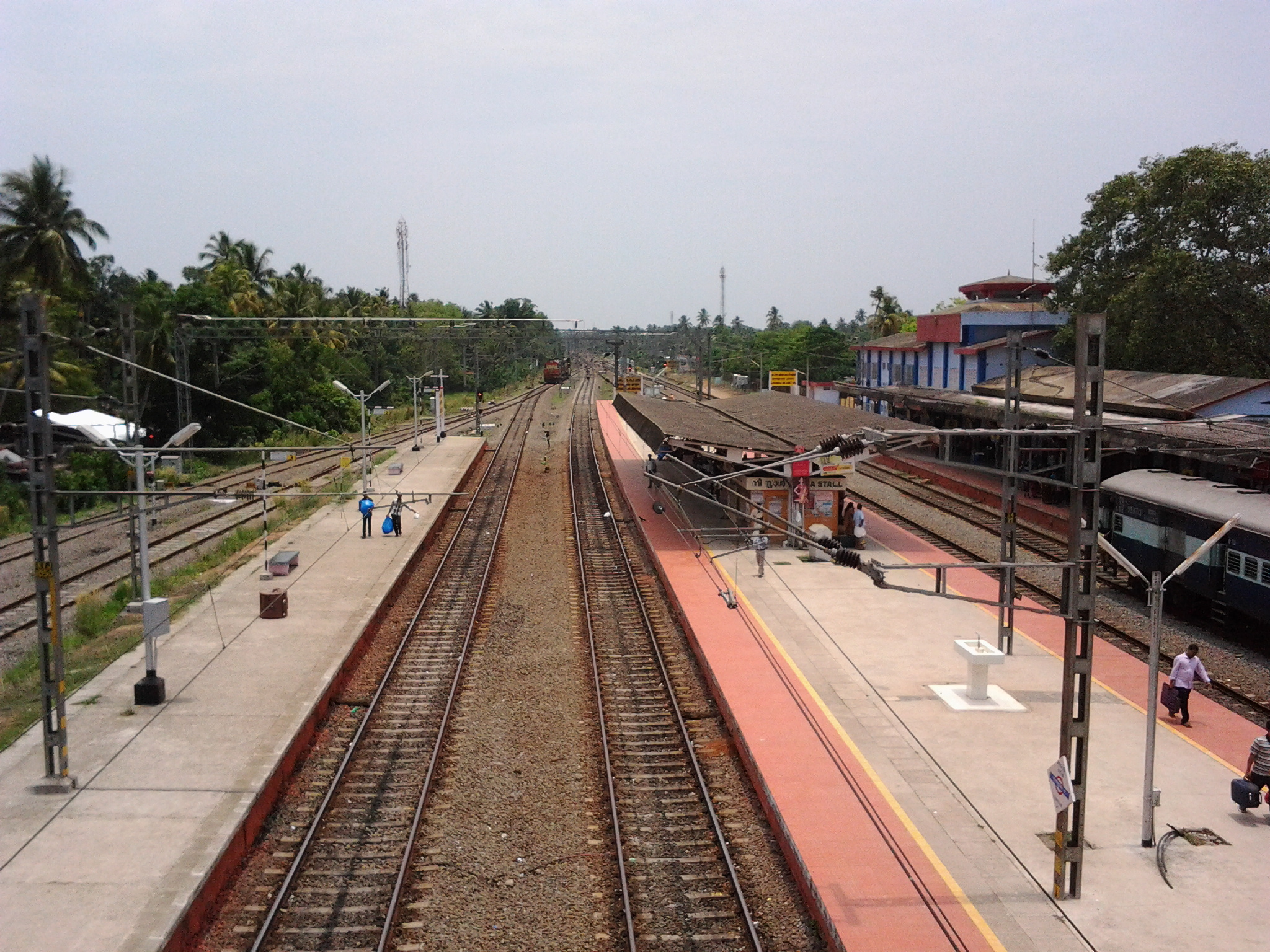
- Mavelikara railway station

General information
- Location: Mavelikkara, Alappuzha, Kerala; India
- Coordinates: 9.23919°N 76.54623°E
- System: Express train and Passenger train station
- Owner: Indian Railways
- Operator: Southern Railway zone Thiruvananthapuram Division
- Line: Ernakulam–Kottayam–Kollam line
- Platforms: 3
- Tracks: 5
- Connections: Bus [Mavelikara-Kattanam Bus]

Construction
- Structure type: At–grade
- Parking: Available

Other information
- Status: Functioning (Under Construction)
- Station code: MVLK
- Zone(s): Southern Railway zone
- Division(s): Thiruvananthapuram
- Fare zone: Indian Railways
- Classification: NSG-5

History
- Opened: 1958; 68 years ago
- Rebuilt: 2024 (Continuing)
- Electrified: 25 kV AC 50 Hz

Passengers
- 2,186 per day Annual Passengers – 7,97,747 (2018–19)
Route map
Location
- Location within India Location within Kerala

Mavelikara railway station (station code: MVLK) is an NSG–5 category Indian railway station in Thiruvananthapuram railway division of Southern Railway zone. It is a railway station in Alappuzha district, Kerala.

== History ==
Mavelikara rail link came into existence in 1958 when Ernakulam–Kottayam metre-gauge railway line was extended to Kollam Junction. The railway line between Trivandrum Central and Ernakulam Junction via Kottayam was converted to broad gauge in 1976.

== Significance ==
Mavelikara railway station is the nearest rail station to pilgrimage places like Pandalam, Chettikulangara Devi Temple and Kandiyoor Sree Mahadeva Temple.

== See also ==
- Ernakulam–Kottayam–Kollam line
- Koyilandy
- Chengannur
- Kayamkulam
- Karunagappalli
- Thiruvananthapuram railway division
- Kottayam
