= Kayamkulam Junction railway station =

Railway station in Kerala, India

Kayamkulam Junction
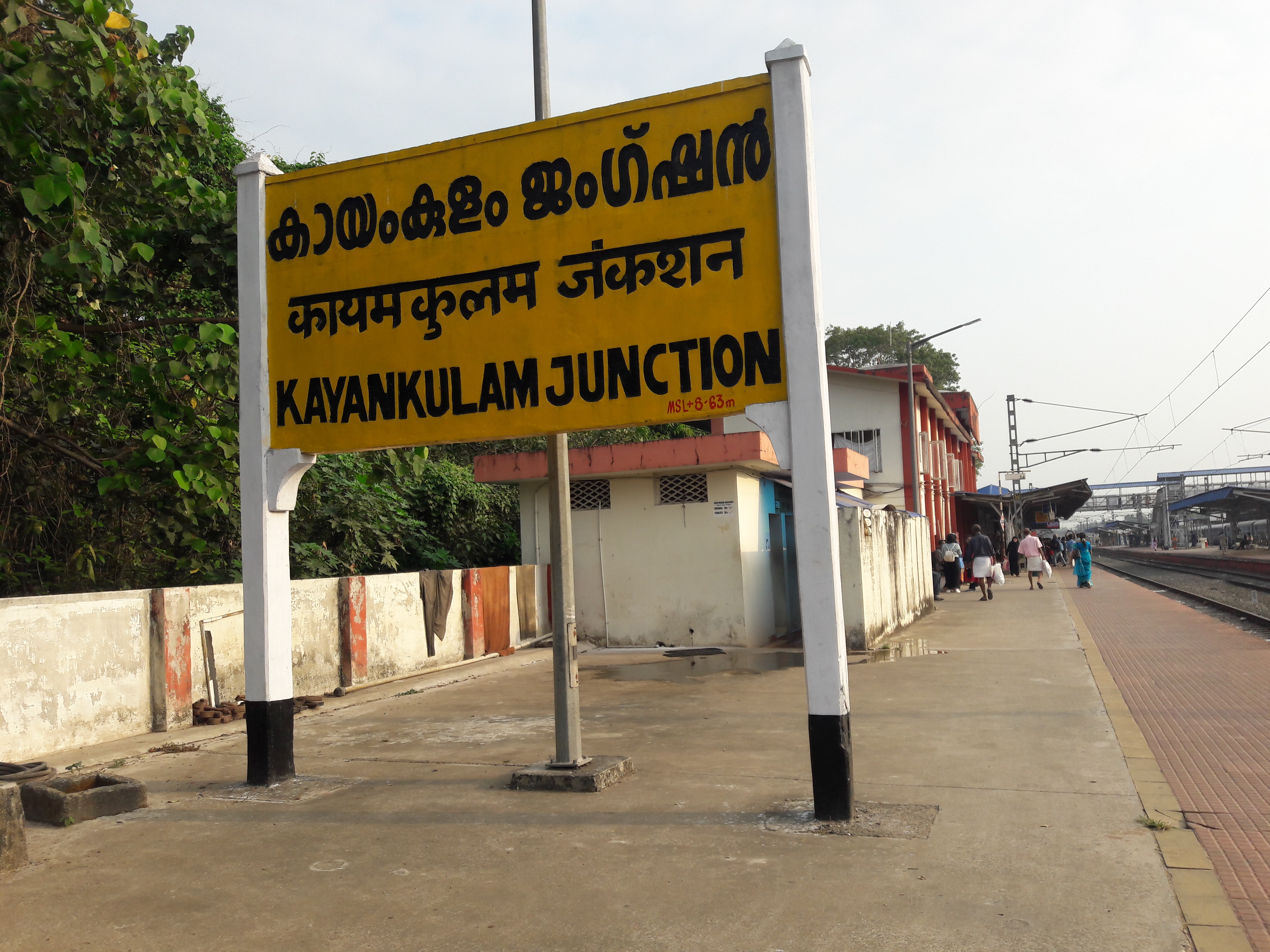

General information
- Location: Kayamkulam, Alappuzha, Kerala, India
- Coordinates: 9.1825°N 76.5128°E
- System: Express train & Passenger train station
- Owner: Indian Railways
- Lines: Ernakulam-Alappuzha-Kayamkulam line Ernakulam–Kottayam-Kollam line
- Platforms: 5
- Tracks: 6

Construction
- Parking: Available

Other information
- Status: Active
- Station code: KYJ
- Fare zone: Southern Railway zone
- Classification: NSG-3

History
- Opened: 1958; 68 years ago

Passengers
- 8,561 per day (2018–19 FY)
Route map
Location
- Location within Kerala Location within India

Kayamkulam Junction railway station (station code: KYJ) is an NSG–3 category Indian railway station in Thiruvananthapuram railway division of Southern Railway zone.. It stands at the junction of three lines- south towards Thiruvananthapuram via Kollam, north towards Ernakulam via Alappuzha and north-east towards Ernakulam Junction/Ernakulam Town via Kottayam. The station is located 1.7 km (1.1 mi) from Kayamkulam in Alappuzha district of Kerala, near the Kayamkulam–Pathanapuram Road also known as KP road. In 2018, the rail wi-fi broad-band connection has been introduced in Kayamkulam.

== History ==
Kayamkulam rail link came into existence in 1958 when Kollam–Kottayam railway line was inaugurated. The railway station was upgraded to a junction station in 1992 when the rail link via Alappuzha to Ernakulam was inaugurated.

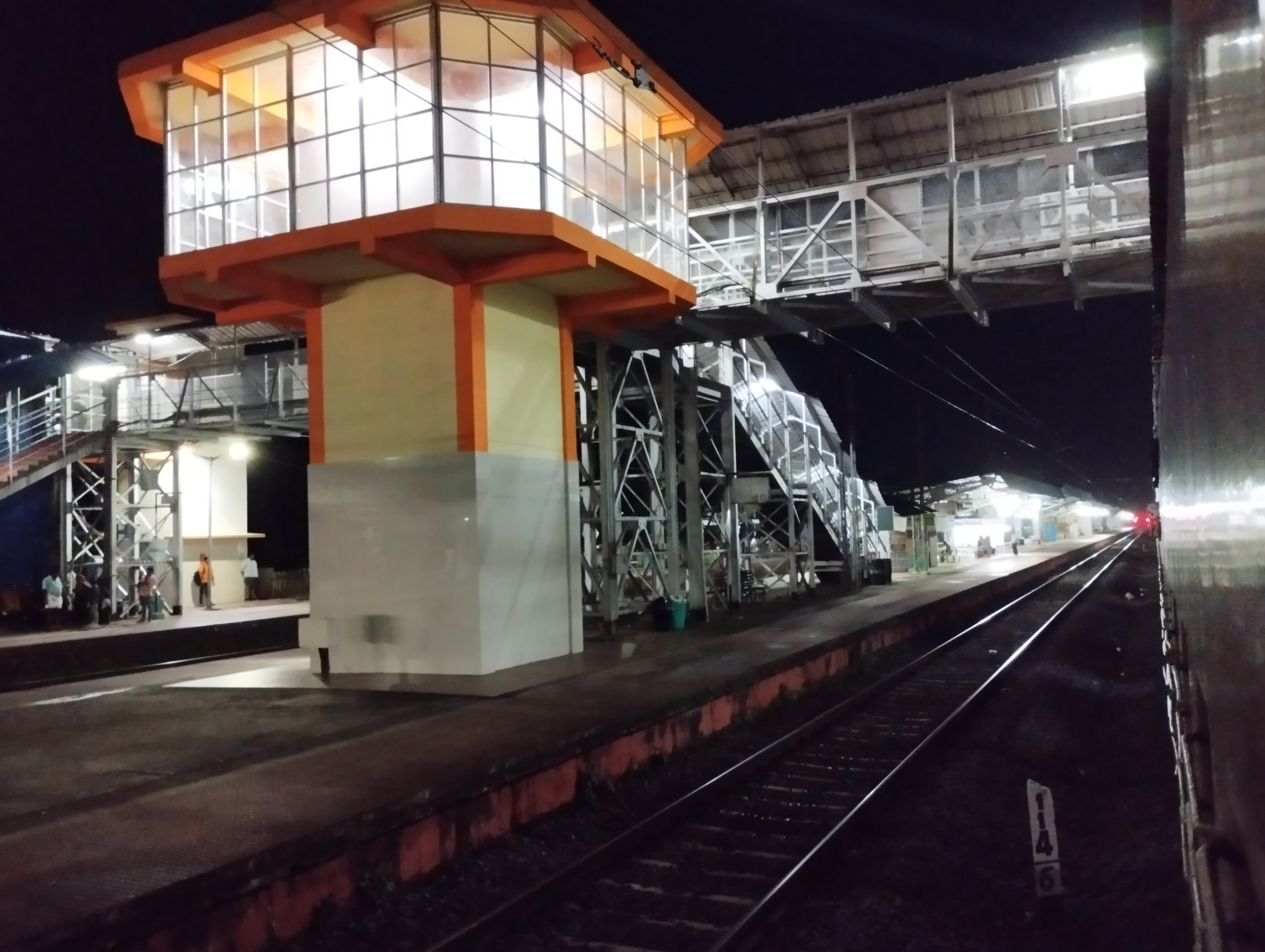
Kayamkulam Railway Station Night View

== Layout ==
This station has five platforms and six tracks to handle long and short-distance trains and goods trains.

Platforms 1 and 2 handles the trains towards the North (PF No. 1 for trains via Alappuzha [coastal railway line] & 2 for trains via Kottayam). The lines via both sides meet up at Ernakulam Junction station[South station] but the line via Kottayam diverges to the Northern side [Ernakulam Town - North station] about a kilometer away before the line loops over to meet the line from Alappuzha at Ernakulam Junction. This is to decongest the railway traffic at Ernakulam - the trains via Alappuzha stops at Ernakulam Junction but not Ernakulam Town and the trains via Kottayam stops at Ernakulam Town by taking the diverging line without entering Ernakulam Junction except a few number of trains that stop at both the North and South stations.

Platforms 3 & 4 handles the trains running towards the Southern side (Kollam - Thiruvananthapuram - Nagercoil - Kanyakumari). PF 3 handles trains from Ernakulam via Alappuzha and the PF 4 for trains from Ernakulam via Kottayam.

Platform 5 is reserved for the passengers that originates from Kayamkulam and terminates at Ernakulam Junction. The sixth track adjacent to the fifth track of PF 5 is used for goods trains to load and unload goods at Kayamkulam.

== Services ==
The train services that originate from Kayamkulam are the four passengers of which three terminate at Ernakulam and one at Alappuzha.

56380 (Kayamkulam - Ernakulam) is a daily passenger via Alappuzha that starts from Kayamkulam at 8:20 am and reaches Ernakulam at 10:50 am.

56382(Kayamkulam - Ernakulam) is a daily passenger via Alappuzha that starts from Kayamkulam at 12:55 pm and reaches Ernakulam at 3:30 pm.

56388 (Kayamkulam - Ernakulam) is a daily passenger via Kottayam that starts from Kayamkulam at 4:30 pm and reaches Ernakulam at 7:45 pm.

56378 (Kayamkulam - Alappuzha) is a daily passenger that starts from Kayamkulam at 10:20 pm and reaches Alappuzha at 11:30 pm.

== See also ==
- Southern Railway zone
- Oachira railway station
- Karunagappally railway station
- Mavelikara railway station
- Haripad railway station
- Chengannur railway station
