= Kottayam railway station =

Railway station in Kerala, India

Kottayam

General information
- Location: Nagampadam, Kottayam, Kottayam district, Kerala; India
- Coordinates: 9.595°N 76.531°E
- System: Long distance rail station
- Owner: Indian Railways
- Operator: Southern Railway zone
- Line: Ernakulam–Kottayam–Kollam line
- Platforms: 6
- Tracks: 9
- Connections: Nagampadam bus stand, Autorikshaw stand, Taxi stand

Construction
- Structure type: Standard on-ground station
- Parking: Available
- Accessible: Disabled access

Other information
- Status: Functioning
- Station code: KTYM
- Zone(s): Southern Railway zone
- Division(s): Thiruvananthapuram
- Classification: NSG-3

History
- Opened: 1956; 70 years ago

Passengers
- 2023–24: 12,091 per day
Route map
Location
- Location within India Location within Kerala

Kottayam railway station (station code: KTYM) is an NSG–3 category Indian railway station in Thiruvananthapuram railway division of Southern Railway zone. It is located in Kottayam, Kerala state, India. The station is served by several long-distance trains connecting most major cities in the country on a daily basis like New Delhi, Mumbai, Chennai, Bengaluru, Hyderabad, Coimbatore, Bhopal, Pune and Mangalore. Trains connecting extreme ends of india also passes through the station like Jammu tawi, Dibrugarh etc. It is one of the busiest station in Thiruvananthapuram central - Ernakulam route due to ease in accessibility of Sabarimala temple. Kottayam railway station is also the halt station for passengers to Vagamon, Kumarakom, Illickal kallu - high range, St. Alphonsa's tomb, Pala and so on. The station has 2 passing platforms - (1 & 2), and 4 terminal platforms (3, 4, 5 & 1A). Except platform 1A all the platforms are able to accommodate locomotives with 24 coaches and platform 1A can accommodate Memu/passenger trains with 13 coaches. The station is currently under construction with a second entrance. By completing double line from Chingavanam to Ettumanoor, southern railway has achieved its complete stretch of double rail line from Thiruvananthapuram to Mangalore

== History ==
The works for the metre-gauge project between Ernakulam and Kollam commenced on 24 December 1952. The metre-gauge railway line from Ernakulam to Kottayam was completed in 1956 and was formally inaugurated in October 1956. The metre-gauge line was later extended to Kollam on 1958 and was inaugurated on 6 January 1958.

== Layout ==
Kottayam railway station has six platforms for handling long-distance and passenger trains. A railway goods shed was also situated at the station. It was torn down in 2019. The station is located at Nagampadam which is at a distance of 2.5 km from Kottayam town.

== Significance ==
Kottayam railway station is the nearest railway station which caters to famous tourist destinations like Kumarakom. Kottayam railway station is also used by pilgrims going to Sabarimala temple though Chengannur is the hub of Sabarimala. During Sabarimala pilgrim (Mandala) season, state transport bus operates from this station.

== Trains originating & terminating at Kottayam ==
- Nilambur Road - Kottayam Express (16325/16326)
- Nagercoil - Kottayam Express (16366) - Termination only
- Kottayam - Ernakulam Junction MEMU / Passengers
- Kottayam - Kollam Junction MEMU / Passengers

== Major trains ==
The major trains running along this route:

- Thiruvananthapuram - Kasaragod Vande Bharat Express.
- Nagercoil–Mangaluru Amrit Bharat Express
- Charlapalli – Thiruvananthapuram North Amrit Bharat Express
- Kochuveli - Lokmanya Tilak Garib Rath Express.
- Kochuveli - Yesvantpur Garib Rath Express.
- Thiruvananthapuram - Kannur Jan Shatabdi Express.
- Kochuveli - Bengaluru Humsafar Express.

Express trains like New Delhi - Thiruvananthapuram Kerala Superfast Express, Kanyakumari - Dibrugarh Vivek Superfast Express (longest running train in India), Himsagar Express, Kanniyakumari - Pune Express, Amritha Express, Ernakulam-Velankanni express, Kollam–Tirupati Express, Palaruvi Express, Malabar Express, Parasuram Express, Rajya Rani Express, Venad Express etc run along through this route.

== See also ==
- Ernakulam–Kottayam–Kollam line
- Chengannur railway station
- Tiruvalla railway station
- Changanasseri railway station
- Thiruvananthapuram railway division
- Punalur railway station
