= Ernakulam Town railway station =

Railway station in Kerala, India

Ernakulam Town
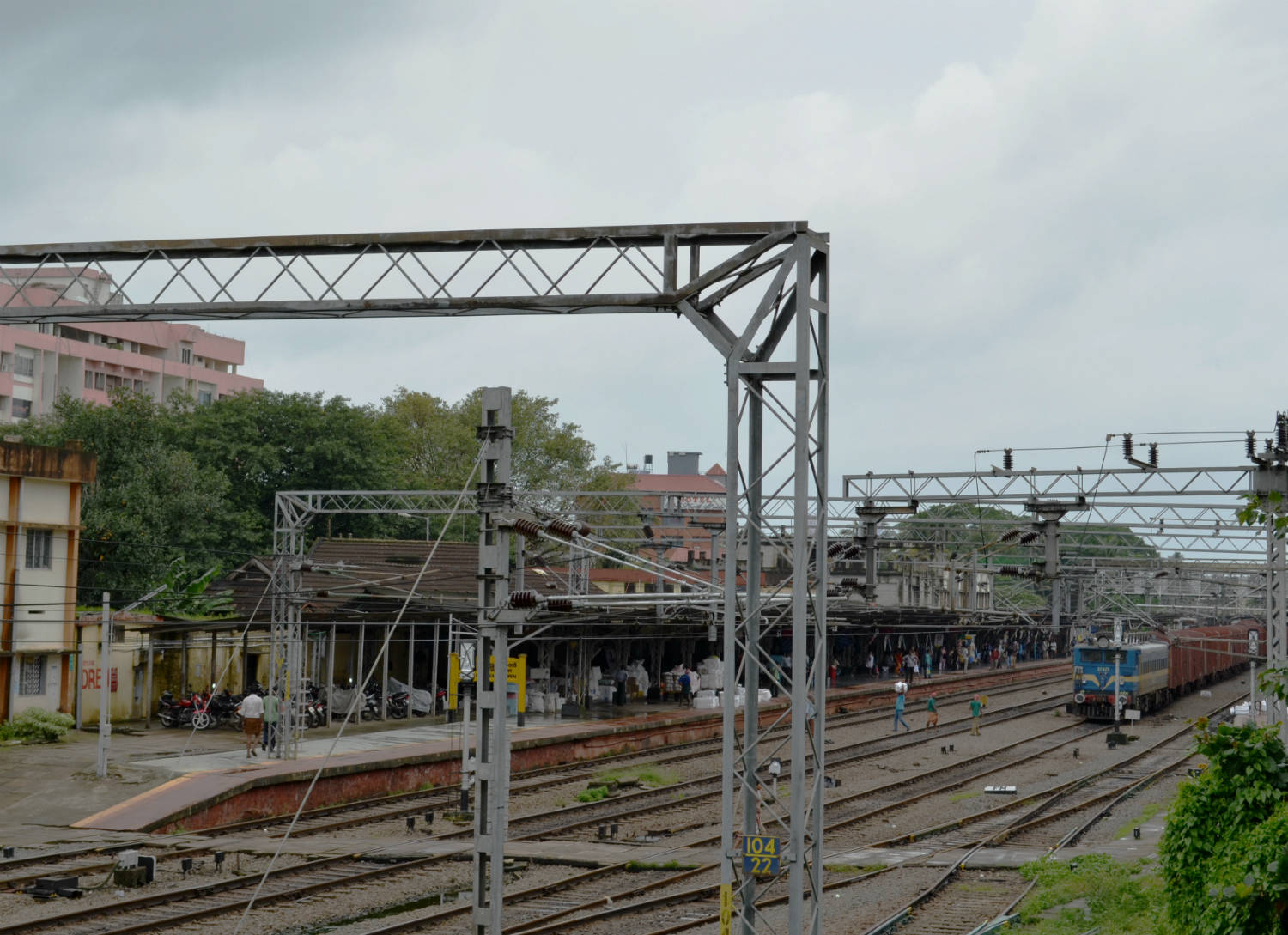

General information
- Other names: Ernakulam North
- Location: Ernakulum North, Ernakulam, Kerala; India
- Coordinates: 9°59′30.40″N 76°17′12.13″E
- Elevation: 27 ft (8.2 m)
- System: Express train, Passenger train and Commuter station
- Owner: Indian Railways
- Operator: Southern Railway zone
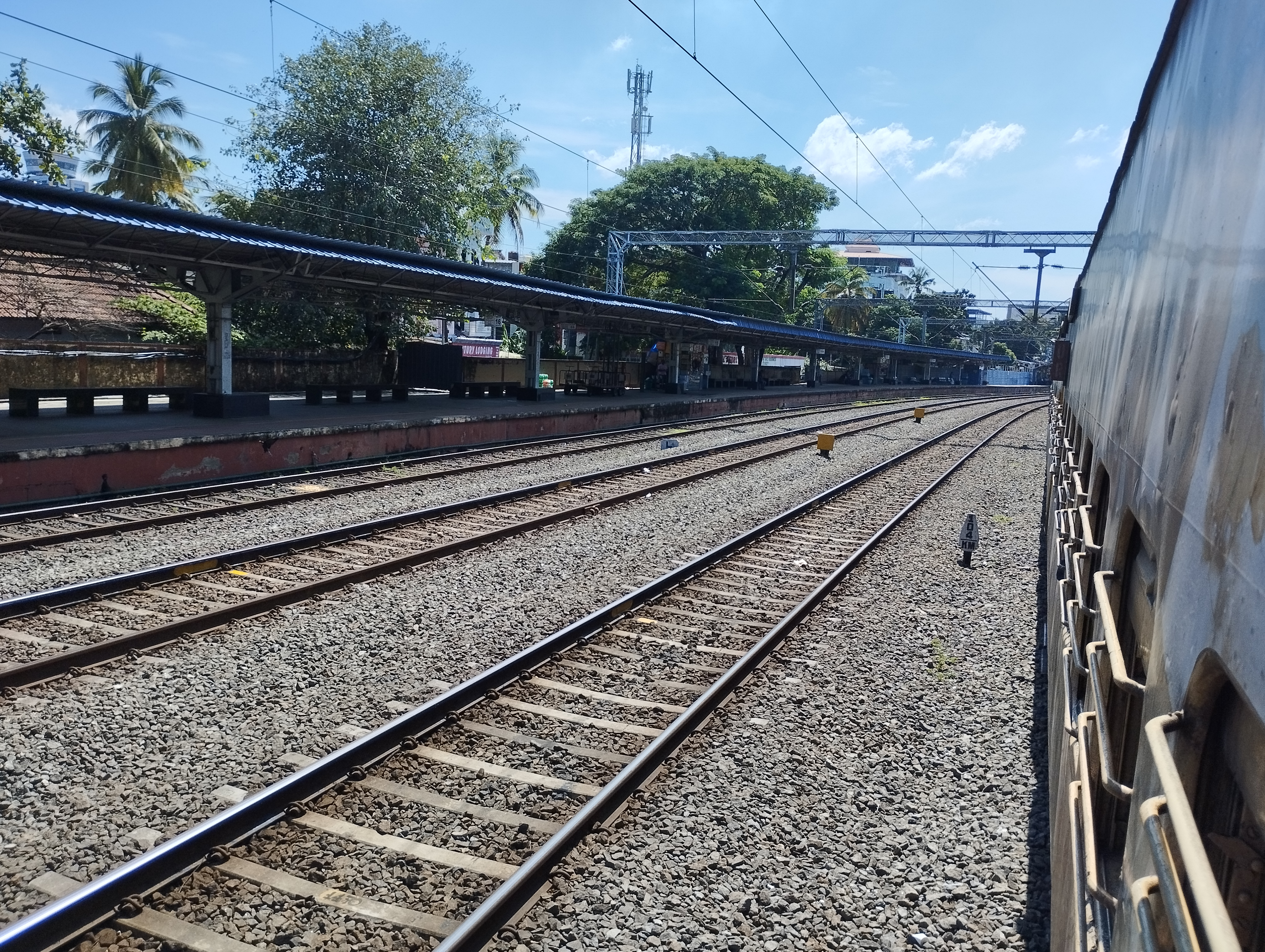
- Lines: Shoranur–Cochin Harbour section Ernakulam–Kottayam–Kollam line Ernakulam–Alappuzha–Kayamkulam line image = Eranakulam Town Railway Station
- Platforms: 2
- Tracks: 4
- Connections: Blue Line Town Hall, Kaloor Private Bus Stand

Construction
- Parking: Available
- Accessible: Yes

Other information
- Status: Active
- Station code: ERN
- Zone(s): Southern Railway zone
- Division(s): Thiruvananthapuram

History
- Opened: 1890; 136 years ago
- Rebuilt: 2003; 23 years ago (first); August 2025; 14 months ago (second)

Passengers
- 2018-19: 27,945 per day Annual passengers – 1,02,00,000 (2021–22)
- Rank: 9 (in Kerala); 6 (in Trivandrum division)
Route map
Location
- Location within India Location within Kerala

Ernakulam Town (also known as Ernakulam North) (station code: ERN) is an NSG–2 category Indian railway station in Thiruvananthapuram railway division of Southern Railway zone. It is the second major railway station in Kochi after Ernakulam Junction. It is located in the northern part of the city and handles around 90 trains daily. With an annual passenger footfall of 1.02 crore, Ernakulam Town railway station serves as a main stop in Ernakulam for the trains that travels through the Kottayam line.

== Administration ==
The station is operated by the Southern Railway zone of the Indian Railways and is an 'A–grade' station under Thiruvananthapuram railway division.

== Background ==
Among Kochites, this station is referred to as "Ernakulam North" or simply "North" as it is in the Northern part of Ernakulam, to distinguish it from Ernakulam Junction which in turn is referred to as (and was officially called for a long time as) "Ernakulam South" or simply "South". This is a convenient station to alight for passengers travelling to northern suburbs of Ernakulam city and nearby areas. The major railway station in Ernakulam is the Ernakulam Junction.

== Location ==
Ernakulam Town railway station is situated between Kaloor and Kacheripady. This area of the city is known as North due to the presence of the station which was previously known as Ernakulam North. The locals still refer to it as North station.

The main entrance is situated on the western side of the railway line near to Kacheripady, while a smaller eastern entrance is located on SRM Road. Both entrances are 300 metres from Banerji Road.

All city bus routes to and from the MG Road, Menaka, Fort Kochi and Mattancherry areas stop on both sides of the North overbridge on Banerji road, at North and Lissie hospital bus stops. The Kochi Metro's Town Hall metro station is located 300 metres away from the eastern entrance.

== See also ==
- Cochin Harbour Terminus
- Ernakulam Terminus railway station
- Transport in Kochi
- Ernakulam Junction
