= Transport in Thrissur =

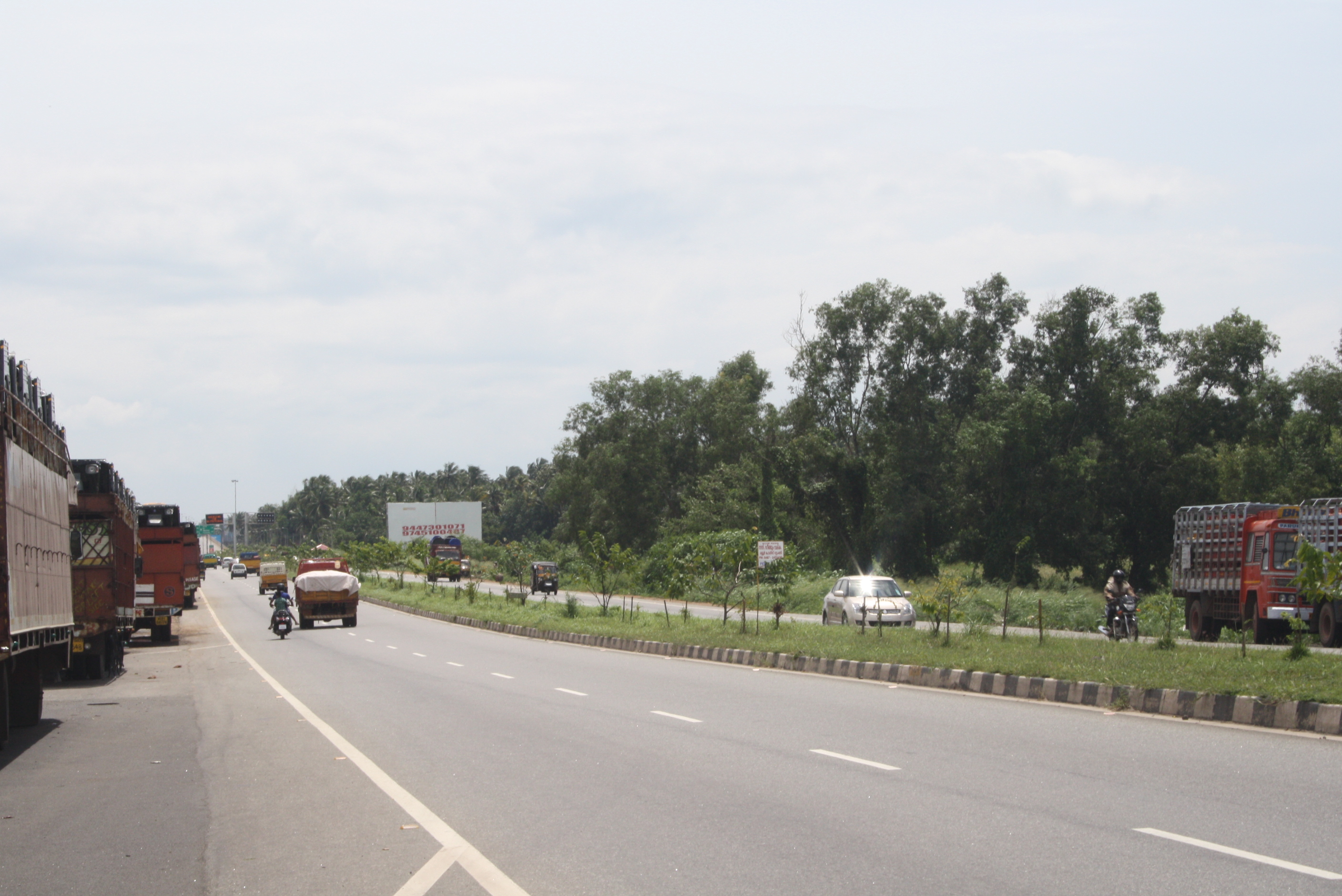
National Highway 544 in Thalore, Thrissur Metropolitan Area. This national highway connects Thrissur city with Kochi and Coimbatore in Tamil Nadu

Transport in Thrissur City is served by state-owned Kerala State Road Transport Corporation (KSRTC), private buses, Indian Railways, auto rickshaws and taxis. The city of Thrissur is situated in the Central part of the state of Kerala, India. It is the headquarters of the Thrissur district. It is known as the Cultural Capital of Kerala.

== Public transport ==
For transport within the city, private buses, state buses, taxis and autos are available throughout the day. Private buses operate throughout Thrissur City.

- Shaktan Thampuran Private Bus Stand: Inter-state, district and local private buses operate from this bus terminal.
- Thrissur KSRTC bus station: All Kerala State Road Transport Corporation operates from this bus stand.

== Roadways ==
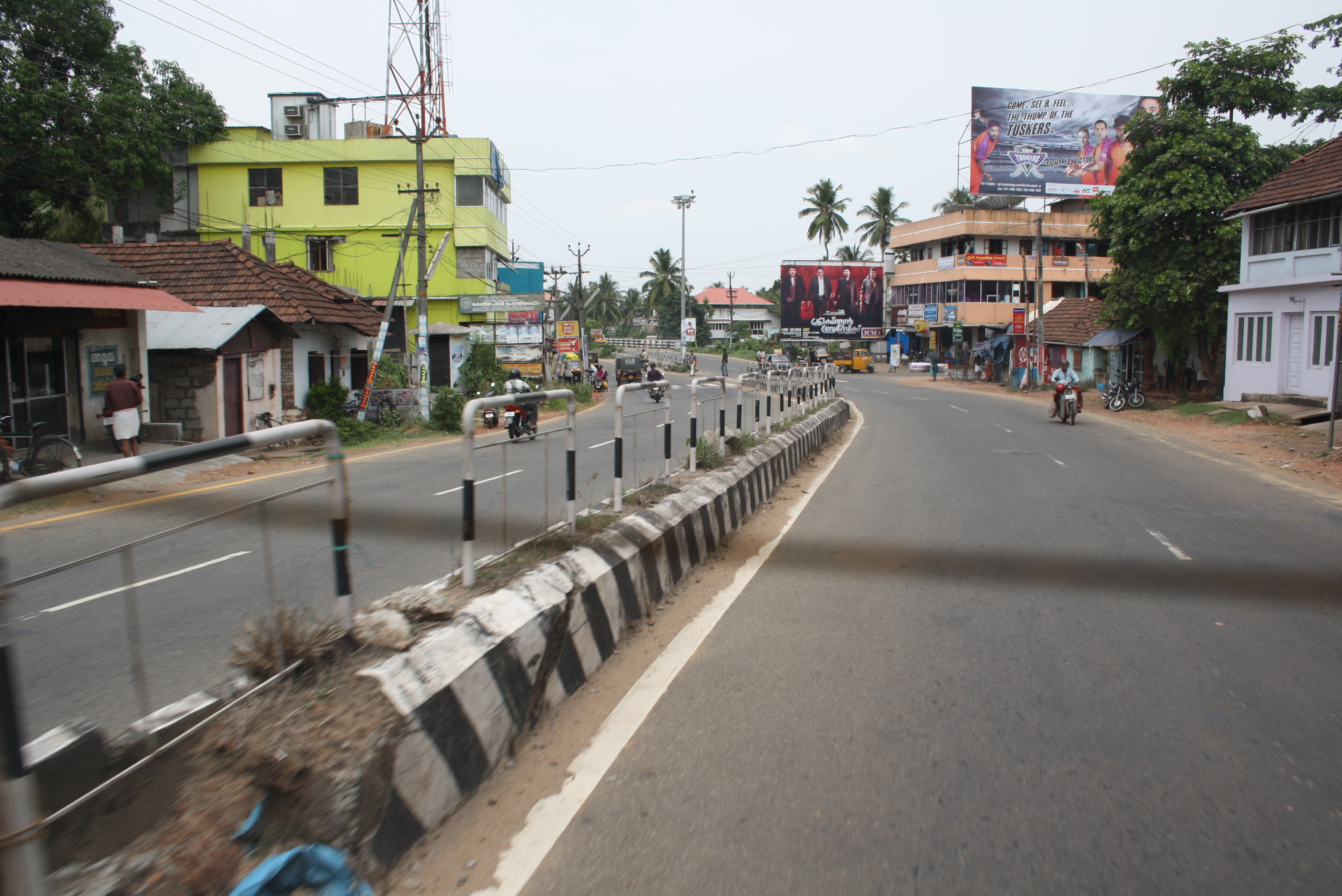
State Highway 22 (Kerala) in Thrissur city. This highway connects Kodungallur in Thrissur Metropolitan Area to Palakkad district

=== National Highways ===
Two major National Highways traverse through Thrissur city and Thrissur Metropolitan Area:

- National Highway 544 connects Thrissur with Coimbatore city and South Tamil Nadu going through Salem, Trichy.
- National Highway 66 connects Thrissur Metropolitan Area to Karnataka, Goa and Maharashtra.

=== State Highways ===
With 101 km^{2} area, Thrissur city has a road network of 526 km of which nearly 76% is surfaced. The road density is 5.2 km per km^{2} area. The city roads are owned and maintained by Kerala Government and Thrissur Municipal Corporation.

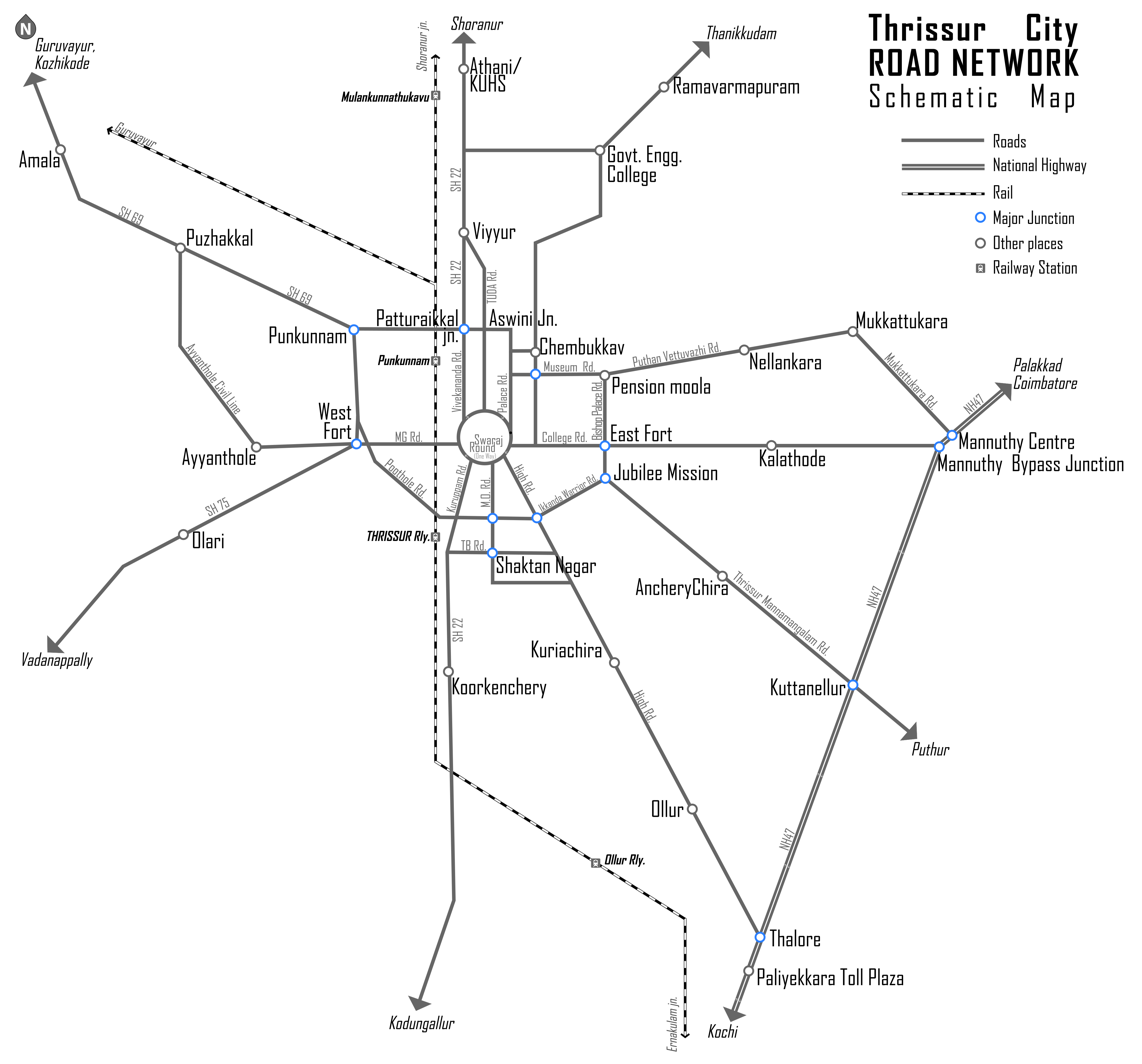
Schematic road network map of Thrissur City

- State Highway 22 (Kerala): This highway connects Kodungallur in Thrissur Metropolitan Area to Palakkad district.
- State Highway 49 (Kerala): This highway connects Guruvayur in Thrissur Metropolitan Area to Choondal.
- State Highway 50 (Kerala): This highway connects Chavakkad in Thrissur Metropolitan Area to Wadakkancherry.
- State Highway 51 (Kerala): This highway connects Kodakara in Thrissur Metropolitan Area to Kodungallur in Thrissur Metropolitan Area.
- State Highway 58 (Kerala): This highway connects Vadakkencherry in Thrissur Metropolitan Area to Pollachi in Tamil Nadu.
- State Highway 59 (Kerala): Hill Highway (Kerala) connects parts of hilly areas in Thrissur Metropolitan Area
- State Highway 61 (Kerala): This highway connects Potta in Thrissur Metropolitan Area to Moonupeedika Road.
- State Highway 62 (Kerala): This highway connects Guruvayur in Thrissur Metropolitan Area to Kundukadavu.
- State Highway 69 (Kerala): This highway connects Thrissur City to Thavanur in Malappuram.
- State Highway 74 (Kerala): This Highway connects Chelakkara road in Thrissur Metropolitan Area
- State Highway 75 (Kerala): This highway connects Thrissur City to Vadanappally in Thrissur Metropolitan Area
- State Highway 76 (Kerala): This highway connects Kuruvanchery in Thrissur Metropolitan Area to Kecheri in Thrissur Metropolitan Area.
- State Highway 77 (Kerala): This highway connects Lakkidi Road in Thrissur Metropolitan Area to Palakkad district.

==== Distance chart ====
| City/Town | Distance (km) | City/Town | Distance (km) | City/Town | Distance (km) | City/Town | Distance (km) |
|---|---|---|---|---|---|---|---|
| Alappuzha | 130 | Kanyakumari | 369 | Kozhikode | 125 | Mysore | 265 |
| Bangalore | 468 | Kannur | 218 | Thiruvananthapuram | 280 | Ooty | 198 |
| Chennai | 603 | Kochi | 71 | Madurai | 280 | Palakkad | 65 |
| Coimbatore | 118 | Cochin International Airport | 59 | Mangalore | 359 | Panaji (Goa) | 735 |
| Coimbatore International Airport | 132 | Kollam | 213 | Mumbai | 1311 | Sabarimala | 205 |
| Guruvayur | 27 | Thodupuzha | 100 | Munnar | 159 | Thekkady | 213 |

== Railways ==
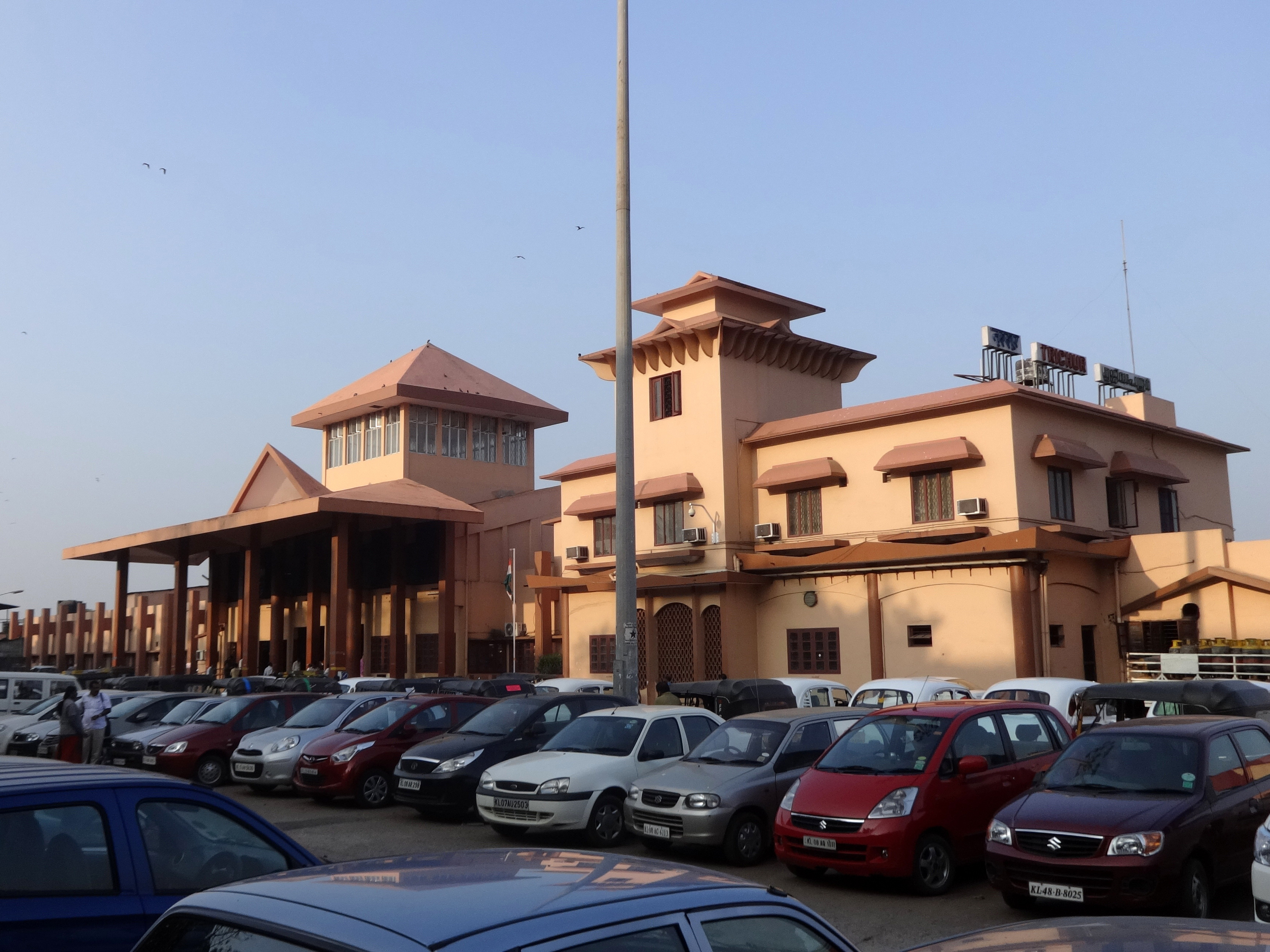
A view of Thrissur railway station

Thrissur city has four railway stations in the city limit, Thrissur, Mulankunnathukavu, Punkunnam and Ollur. Thrissur railway station is the main railway head where all passenger, express and mail trains stop. The station lies in the heart of the city and is busiest railway station in Southern India handling over 20,000 passengers daily.

The wider Thrissur Metropolitan Area has ten railway stations, Wadakkanchery, Guruvayur, Pudukad, Irinjalakuda, Chalakudi, Divine Nagar, Koratty, Vallathol Nagar, Mullurkara and Nellayi. Shoranur–Cochin Harbour section and Thrissur–Guruvayur section are the two railway lines which pass through the Thrissur Metropolitan Area.

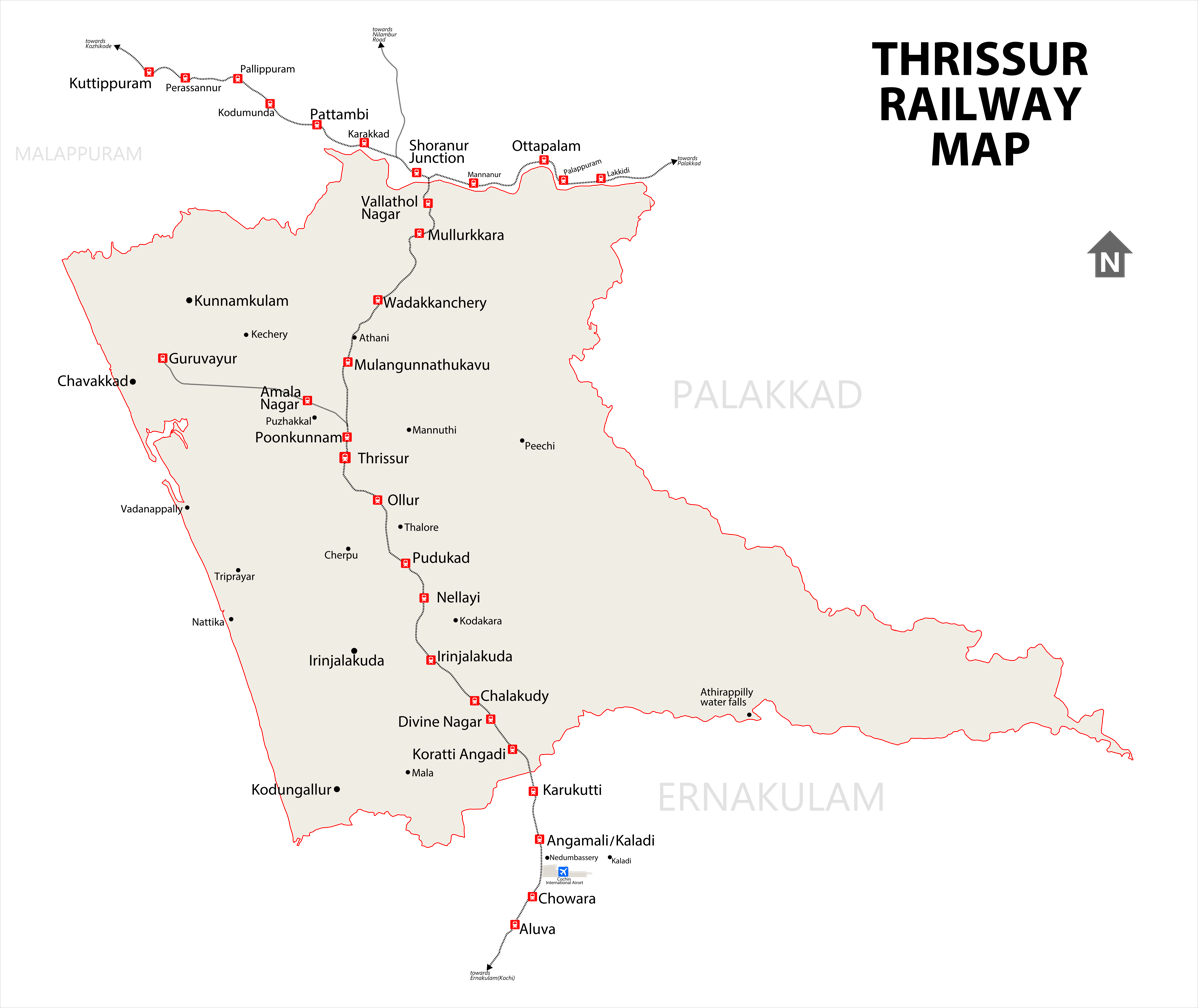
Railway network in Thrissur District

=== Stations in Thrissur city ===
- Thrissur railway station
- Ollur railway station
- Punkunnam railway station
- Mulankunnathukavu railway station

=== Stations in Thrissur Metropolitan Area ===
- Vallathol Nagar railway station
- Mullurkara railway station
- Wadakkanchery railway station
- Pudukad railway station
- Nellayi railway station
- Irinjalakuda railway station
- Chalakudi railway station
- Koratty railway station
- Divine Nagar railway station
- Guruvayur railway station

== Airport ==
There are no airports in Thrissur City and the nearest airport is Cochin International Airport at Nedumbassery which is located 50 km. Direct domestic flights are available to major Indian cities like Chennai, New Delhi, Mumbai, Bangalore and Kolkata. International flights to Middle East cities like Bahrain, Muscat, Sharjah, Jeddah, Riyadh, Doha and to Southeast Asian cities Singapore and Kuala Lumpur are available here. It has a dedicated heli-taxi service and chartered flights. Calicut International Airport at Karipur in the Malappuram District, which is 80 km from city and Coimbatore Airport, which is 114 kilometers from the city also can be used by travellers.

== Heliport ==
There are four functional heliports in Thrissur city. One is at Sri C. Achutha Menon Government College ground, Kuttanellur known as Kuttanellur Heliport, and the second one at Lulu Convention Centre. The third is in Sobha City above the Sobha Topaz building, and the fourth helipad is owned by Kalyan Jewellers inside the Sobha City complex. Kalyan Jewellers helipad is in 6 acres of land.

== See also ==
- Indian Railways
- Kerala State Road Transport Corporation
