= Wadakkanchery railway station =

Railway station in Kerala, India

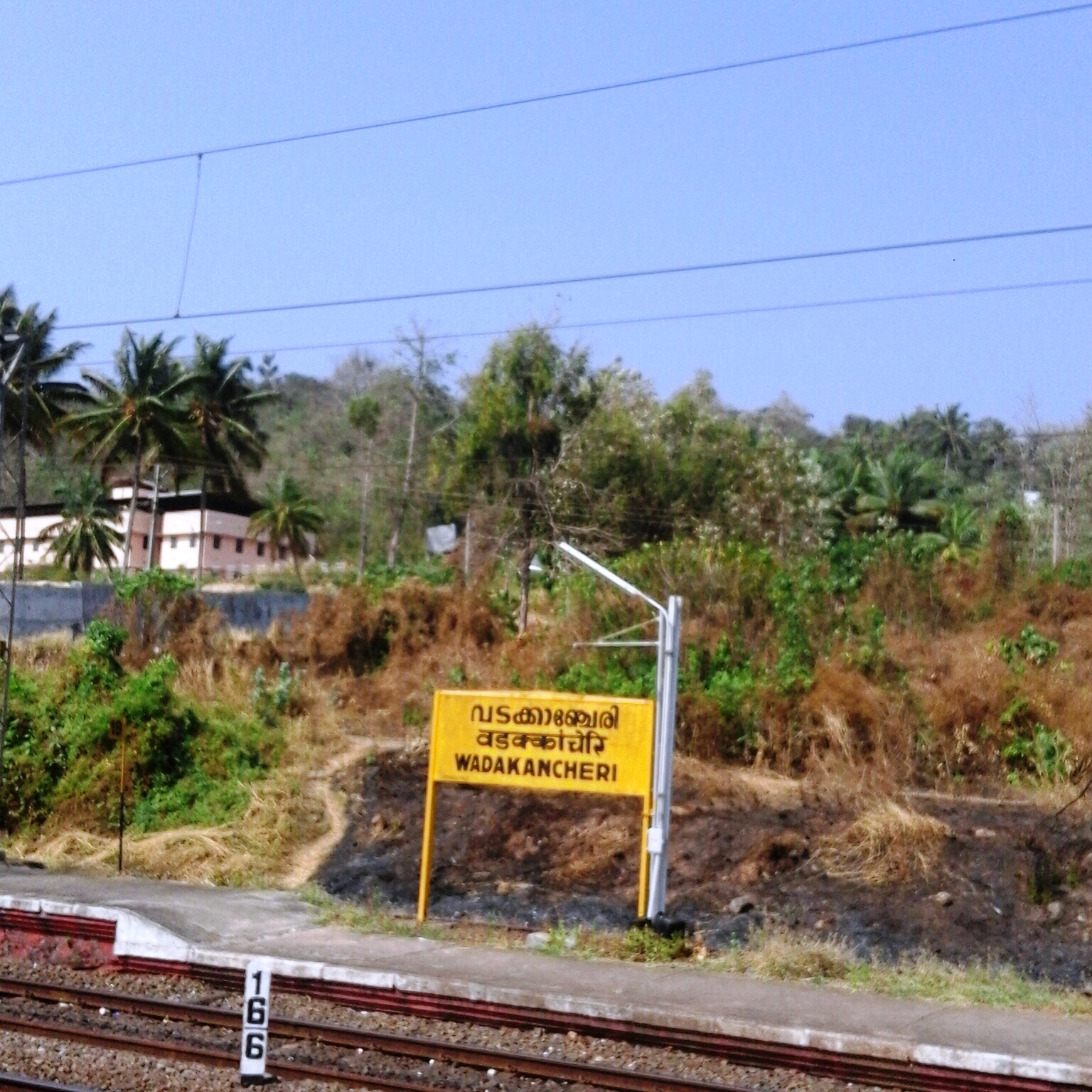
- Wadakkanchery railway station

General information
- Location: Wadakkanchery, Kerala, India
- Coordinates: 10.649°N 76.2375°E
- System: Indian Railways station
- Owner: Indian Railways
- Line: Shoranur–Cochin Harbour section
- Platforms: 3
- Tracks: 5

Construction
- Structure type: Standard on-ground station
- Depth: 3,000 ft (910 m)
- Parking: Available
- Cycle facilities: Available

Other information
- Station code: WKI
- Fare zone: Southern Railway

History
- Opened: 2 June 1902; 124 years ago
- Closed: 2020
- Rebuilt: 2023 (2 years ago )

Passengers
- 1900: 800 ▲40%
Location
- Location within India Location within Kerala

Wadakkanchery railway station (station code: WKI) is an NSG–5 category Indian railway station in Thiruvananthapuram railway division of Southern Railway zone. It falls between Mulankunnathukavu railway station and Mullurkara railway station in the busy Shoranur–Cochin Harbour section in Thrissur district. Wadakkanchery railway station is operated by the Chennai-headquartered Southern Railways of the Indian Railways. All passenger trains and some express trains stop here.

== See also ==
- Ollur railway station
- Punkunnam railway station
- Chalakudi railway station
- Guruvayur railway station
- Mulankunnathukavu railway station
- Thrissur Railway Passengers’ Association
