= Punkunnam railway station =

Railway station in Kerala, India

Punkunnam
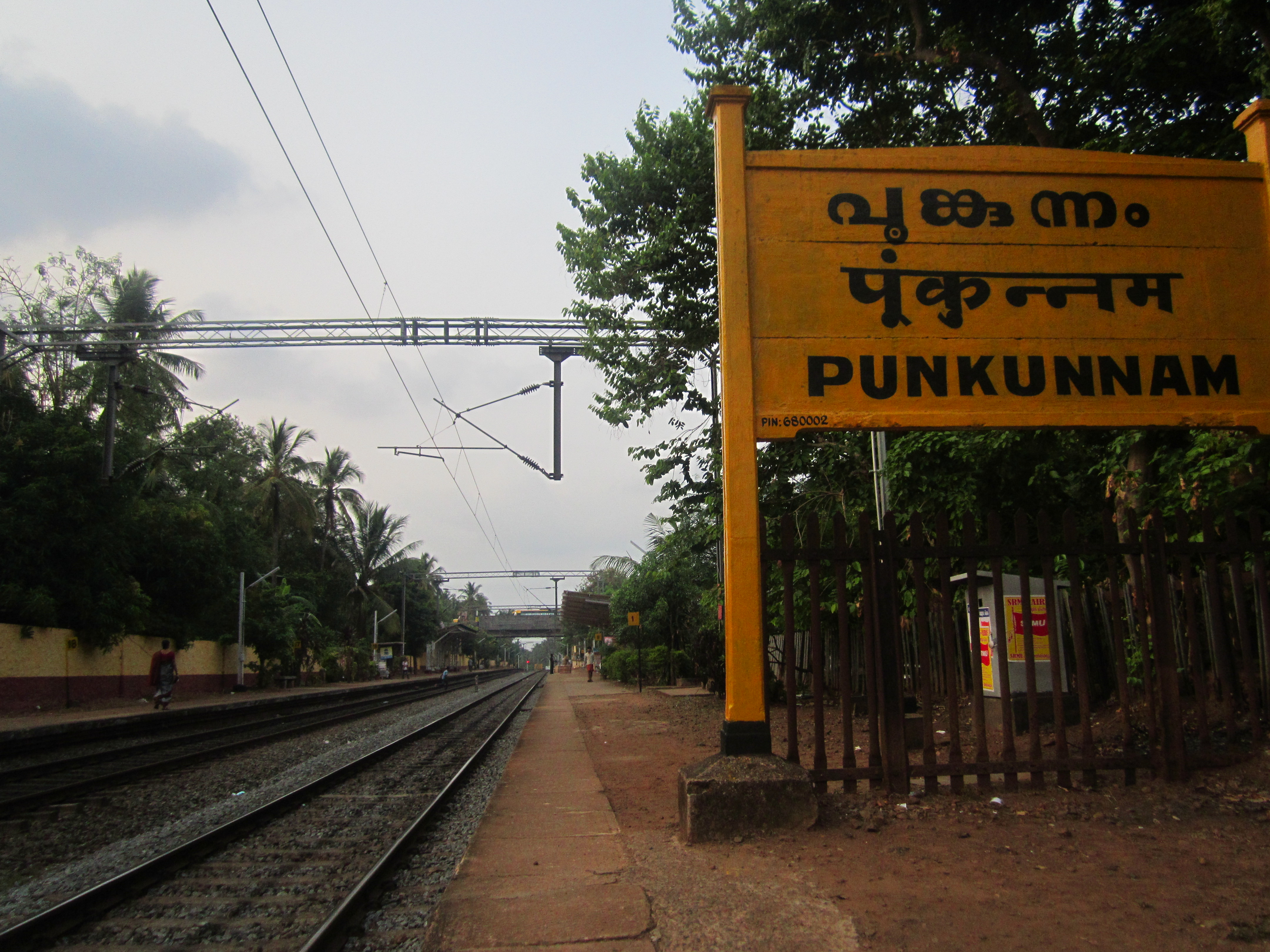

General information
- Location: Punkunnam, Thrissur, Kerala
- Coordinates: 10.534°N 76.209°E
- System: Indian Railways station
- Owner: Ministry of Railways, Indian Railways
- Line: Shoranur–Cochin Harbour section
- Platforms: 2
- Tracks: 2

Construction
- Parking: Available
- Cycle facilities: Not available

Other information
- Fare zone: Southern Railway Zone (India)

History
- Former names: Madras and Southern Mahratta Railway

Services
Waiting room and refreshment
Route map
Location
- Location within India Location within Kerala

Punkunnam railway station (station code: PNQ) is an NSG–6 category Indian railway station in Thiruvananthapuram railway division of Southern Railway zone. It falls between Thrissur railway station and Mulankunnathukavu railway station in the busy Shoranur–Cochin Harbour section. The station is used as suburb station of Thrissur railway station. The station act as a junction where a spur line goes to Guruvayur railway station which is near to the famous Guruvayur Temple. All passenger trains and a few long-distance express trains stop at Punkunnam railway station.

== See also ==
- Ollur railway station
- Chalakudi railway station
- Guruvayur railway station
- Wadakkanchery railway station
- Mulankunnathukavu railway station
