= Mulankunnathukavu railway station =

Railway station in Thrissur, Kerala, India

Mulangunnathukavu
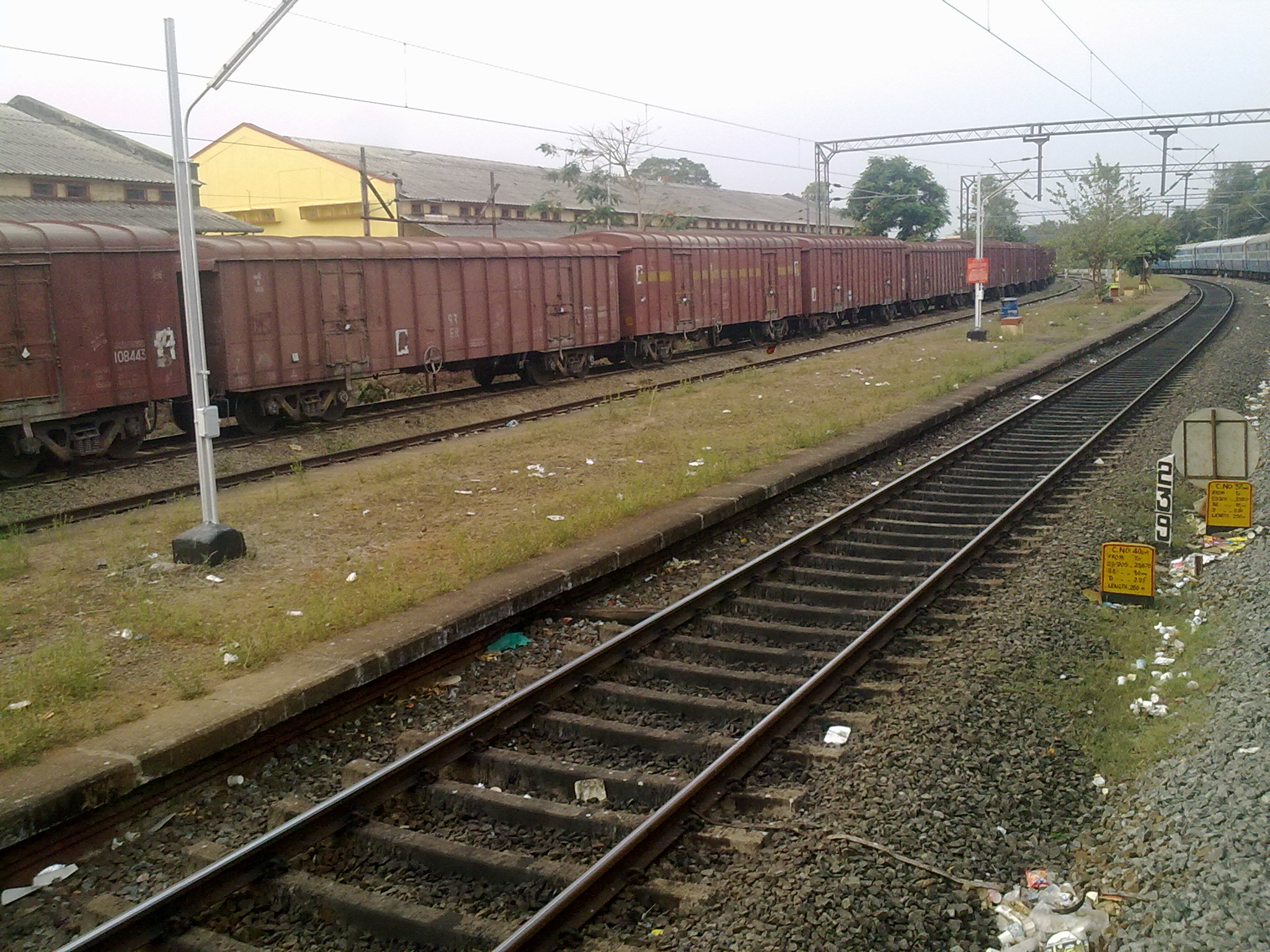
- Second platform of Mulangunnathukavu Railway Station

General information
- Location: Mulangunnathukavu, Kerala, India
- Coordinates: 10.5958°N 76.2076°E
- System: Indian Railways station
- Owner: Indian Railways
- Line: Shoranur–Cochin Harbour section
- Platforms: 2
- Tracks: 5

Construction
- Structure type: Standard on-ground station
- Parking: Available
- Cycle facilities: Available

Other information
- Station code: MGK
- Fare zone: Southern Railway

History
- Opened: June 2, 1902; 124 years ago
Location
- Location within India Location within Kerala

Mulangunnathukavu railway station (station code: MGK) is an NSG–6 category Indian railway station in Thiruvananthapuram railway division of Southern Railway zone. It is in Mulakunnathukavu, a panchayat in Puzhakkal block of Thrissur, which is situated between Wadakkanchery railway station and Punkunnam railway station in the busy Shoranur–Cochin Harbour section.

The station is used as shuttle station for Thrissur railway station that is 10 kilometres (6.2 mi) south. It is just 250 metres (820 ft) away from State Highway 22 (Kerala). Ticketing is computerized and there are also basic parking facilities on site. A Food Corporation of India storage facility is located close nearby. Only passenger trains and MEMU trains stop here. The line presently connects only trains through the cities of Ernakulam, Kozhikode, Palakkad, Shornur, Tirur (Malappuram), Thalassery, Kannur and Coimbatore.

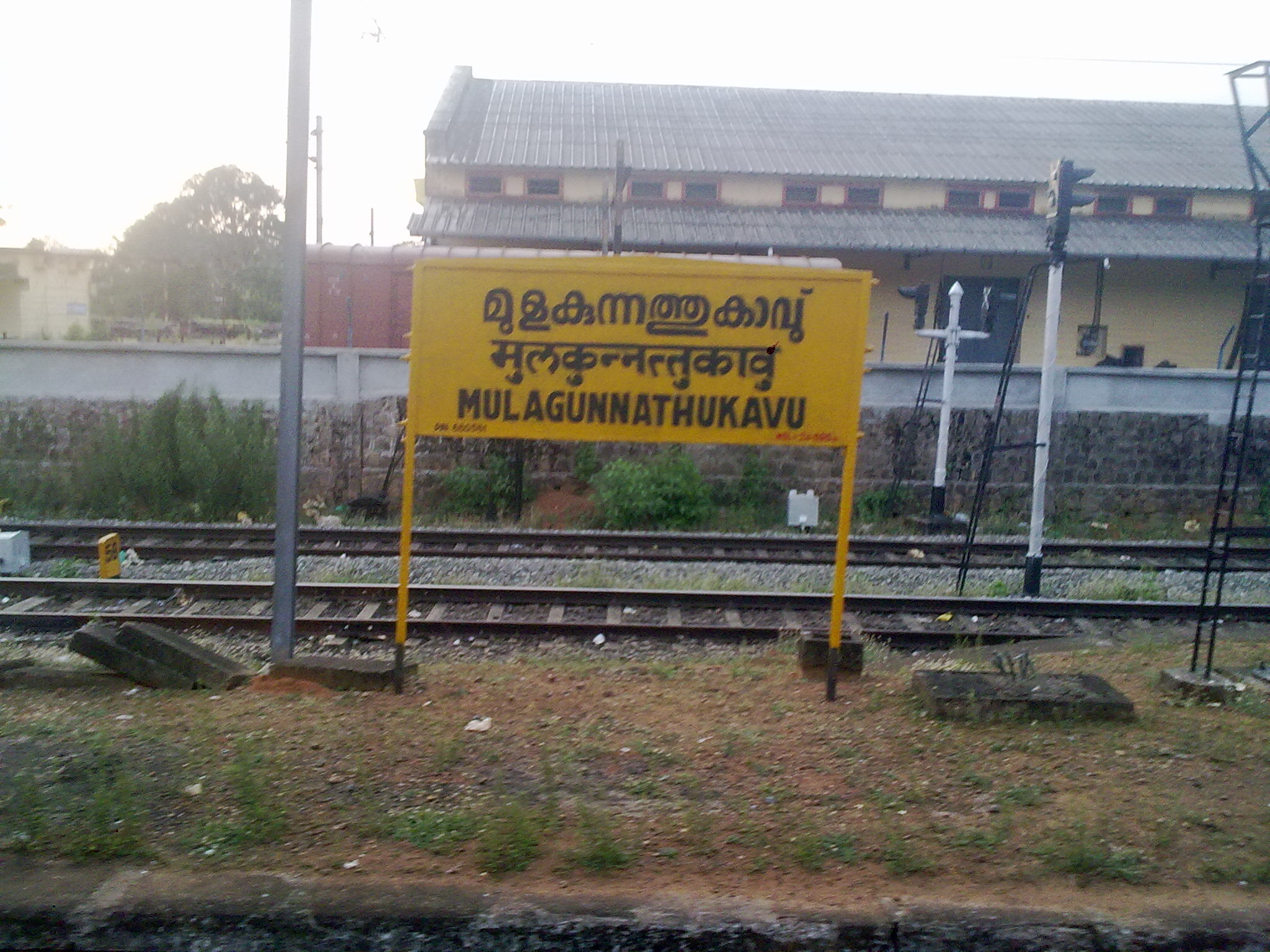
Mulakunnathukavu railway station

== See also ==
- Ollur railway station
- Punkunnam railway station
- Chalakudi railway station
- Guruvayur railway station
- Wadakkanchery railway station
- Thrissur Railway Passengers’ Association
