= Kuttanellur Heliport =

Image of the governmental heliport in Kuttanellur

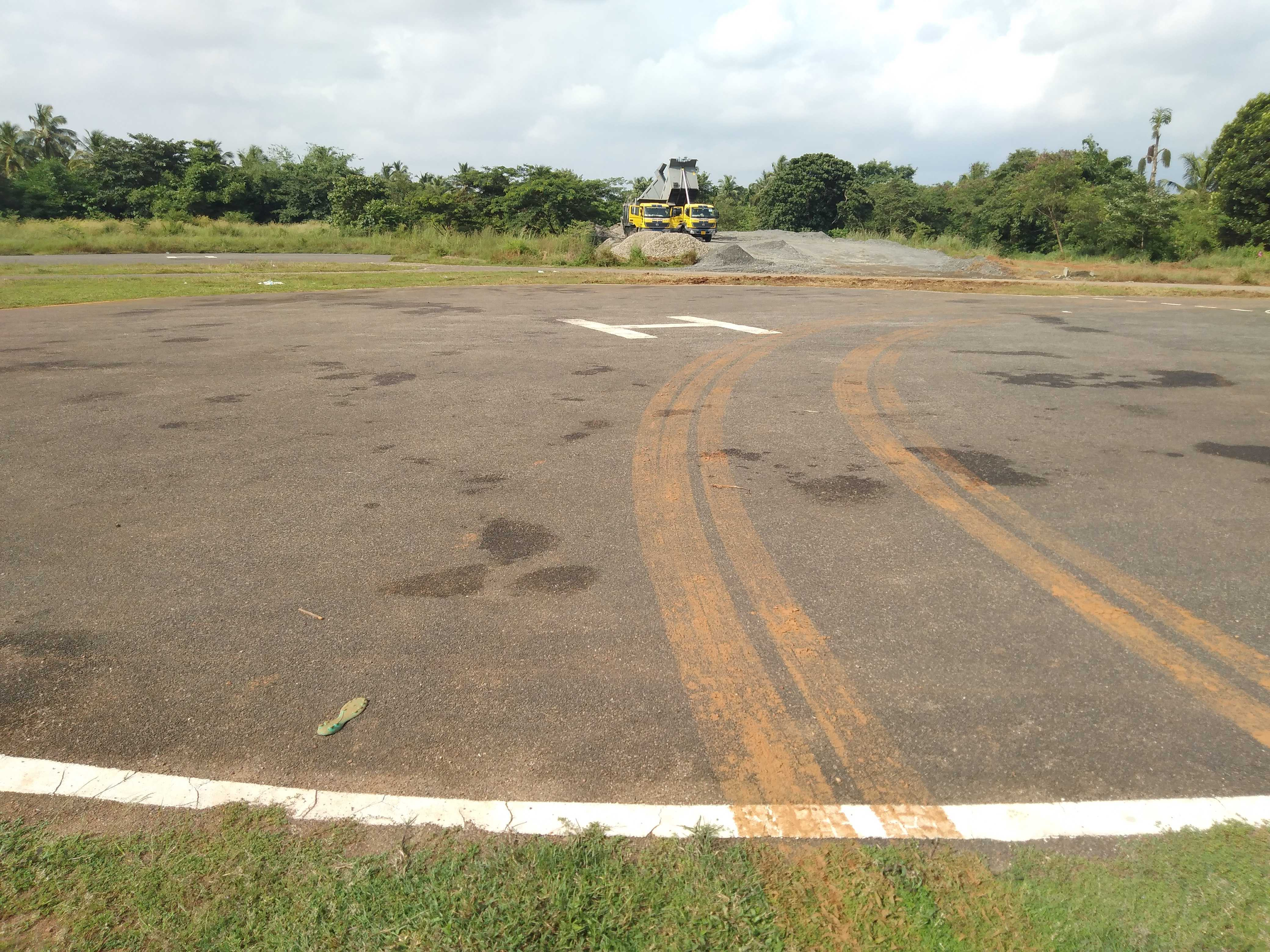
- View of Kuttanellur Heliport from Sri C. Achutha Menon Government College
- IATA: none; ICAO: none

Summary
- Airport type: Public
- Serves: Thrissur
- Location: India
- Coordinates: 10.5017°N 76.2546°E
- Interactive map of Kuttanellur Heliport

Helipads
Number	Length		Surface
Number	ft	m	Surface
			Asphalt

Kuttanellur Heliport is a Government of Kerala-owned heliport located in Kuttanellur, in Thrissur city of Kerala, India. It can be used by giving advance notice to the Government of Kerala or by special permission.

The heliport is situated at Sri C. Achutha Menon Government College, a government-owned college near Ollur. There are two landing ports available at the heliport. The heliport usually witnesses VVIP movements like Prime Minister or President or any ministers visiting Thrissur City or Guruvayur Temple.
