= KSR Bengaluru–Ernakulam Junction Vande Bharat Express =

Vande Bharat Express train route in India

KSR Bengaluru – Ernakulam Junction Vande Bharat Express
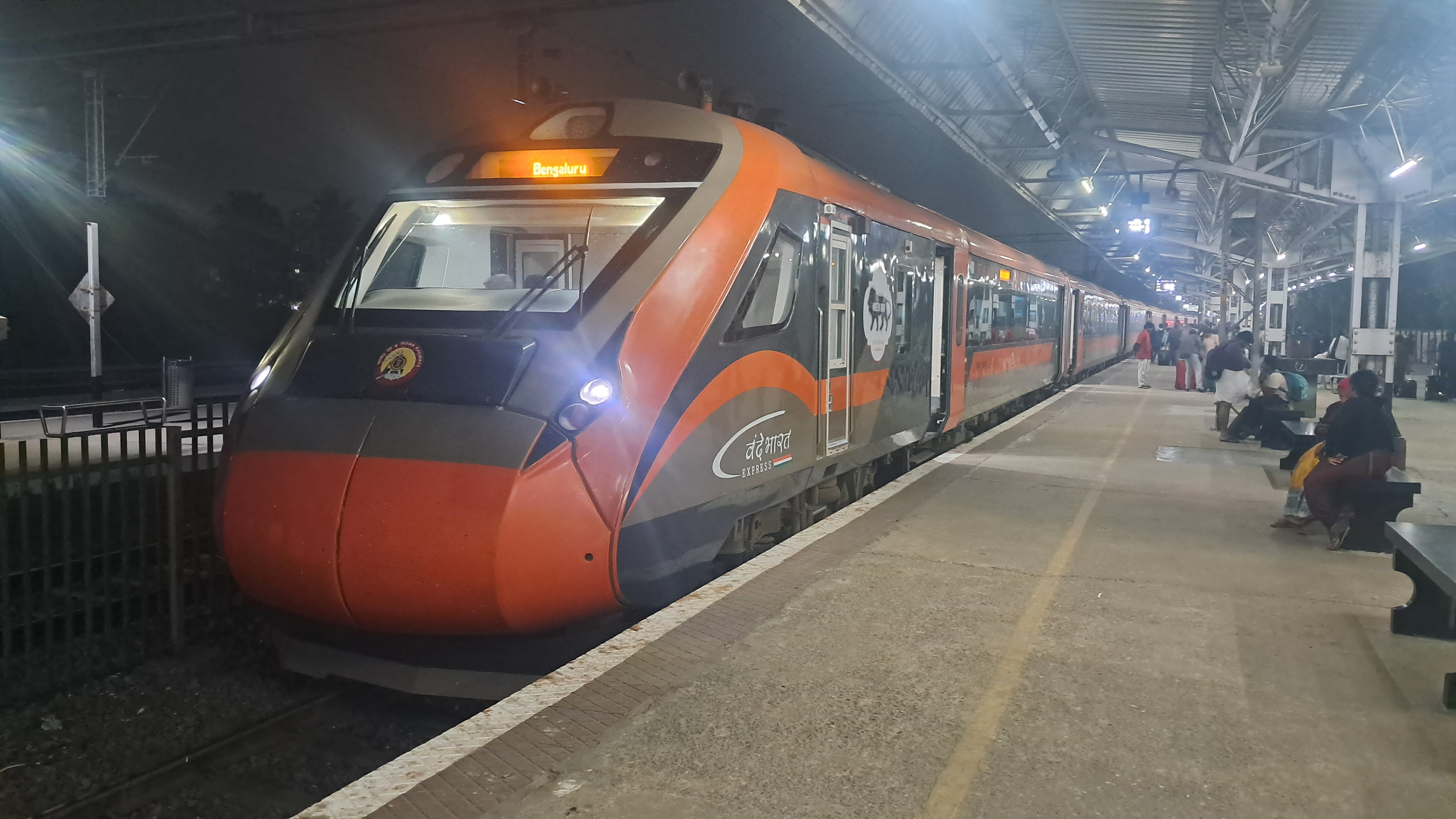
- This Mini Vande Bharat arriving at Krishnarajapuram and heading towards KSR Bengaluru

Overview
- Service type: Vande Bharat Express
- Locale: Karnataka, Tamil Nadu and Kerala
- First service: November 8, 2025; 10 months ago (Inaugural); November 11, 2025; 10 months ago (Commercial)
- Current operator: South Western Railways (SWR)

Route
- Termini: KSR Bengaluru City Jn (SBC); Ernakulam Junction (ERS)
- Stops: 07
- Distance travelled: 625 km (388 mi)
- Average journey time: 08 hrs 40 mins
- Service frequency: Six days a week (Note: Except Wednesdays)
- Train number: 26651 / 26652
- Lines used: Bangalore City–Chennai Central line, Jolarpettai–Shoranur line, Shoranur–Cochin Harbour section

On-board services
- Classes: AC Chair Car, AC Executive Chair Car
- Seating arrangements: Airline style; Rotatable seats
- Sleeping arrangements: No
- Catering facilities: On board Catering
- Observation facilities: Large windows in all coaches
- Entertainment facilities: On-board WiFi; Infotainment system; Electric outlets; Reading light; Seat pockets; Bottle holder; Tray table
- Baggage facilities: Overhead racks
- Other facilities: Kavach

Technical
- Rolling stock: Mini Vande Bharat 2.0 (Last service: Aug 16 2026); Vande Bharat 2.0 (First service: Aug 17 2026)
- Track gauge: Indian gauge
- Electrification: 25 kV 50 Hz AC overhead line
- Operating speed: 72 km/h (45 mph) (Avg.)
- Average length: 384 metres (1,260 ft) (16 coaches)
- Track owner: Indian Railways
- Rake maintenance: KSR Bengaluru (SBC)

The 26651/26652 KSR Bengaluru – Ernakulam Junction Vande Bharat Express is India's 78th Vande Bharat Express train, which connects Bengaluru in Karnataka, with Kochi in Kerala.

This express train was inaugurated by Prime Minister Narendra Modi via video conferencing from Varanasi on November 8, 2025.

== Overview ==
This train is operated by South Western Railways, connecting KSR Bengaluru City Jn., Krishnarajapuram, Salem Junction, Erode Junction, Tiruppur, Coimbatore Junction, Palakkad Junction, Thrissur, and Ernakulam Junction (South). It is currently operated with train numbers 26651/26652, running on six days a week, except on Wednesdays. It carried over 55,000 passengers in its first month of operations.

== Rakes ==
It was the seventy-second 2nd Generation Mini Vande Bharat 2.0 Express train which was designed and manufactured by the Integral Coach Factory at Perambur, Chennai under the Make in India initiative.

=== Coach Augmentation ===
Starting from August 17th 2026, this would be augmented with 08 more additional AC coaches and running with Vande Bharat 2.0 trainset, thus becoming the first Vande Bharat Express train under South Western Railway zone. This has been performed in order to meet the surge in passenger demand owing to the Onam festival and running on this popular route.

== Service ==
The 26651/26652 KSR Bengaluru – Ernakulam Junction Vande Bharat Express currently operates 6 days a week, covering a distance of 625 km (388 mi) in a travel time of 08hrs 40mins with average speed of 72 km/h. The Maximum Permissible Speed (MPS) is 130 km/h (81 mph).

== See also ==
- Vande Bharat Express
- Tejas Express
- Gatiman Express
- KSR Bengaluru City Junction
- Ernakulam Junction railway station
- Mangaluru Central–Thiruvananthapuram Vande Bharat Express
- Kasaragod–Thiruvananthapuram Vande Bharat Express
