= Chalakudi railway station =

Train station in Kerala, India

Chalakudi

General information
- Coordinates: 10.302°N 76.322°E
- System: Indian Railways station
- Owner: Indian Railways
- Platforms: 3
- Tracks: 6

Construction
- Structure type: Standard on-ground station
- Parking: Yes
- Cycle facilities: Yes

Other information
- Station code: CKI
- Fare zone: Southern Railway

Passengers
- 10000 per day (includes up and down passengers, may vary)

Services
Preceding station	Indian Railways	Following station
Irinjalakuda towards Shoranur Junction	Southern Railway zone Shoranur–Cochin Harbour section	Divine Nagar towards Cochin Harbour Terminus
Location
- Location within India Location within Kerala

Chalakudi Railway Station (station code: CKI) is an NSG–5 category Indian railway station in Thiruvananthapuram railway division of Southern Railway zone. It is an important railway station between Irinjalakuda railway station and Divine Nagar railway station in the busy Shoranur–Cochin Harbour section in Thrissur district. Chalakudi railway station is operated by the Chennai-headquartered Southern Railways of the Indian Railways. It is an 'A' class station under Trivandrum division, and the second-largest station in Thrissur district after Thrissur railway station. It is also the first station declared as Adarsh station in Thrissur district. The nearest airport is Cochin International Airport which is 19 kilometers away from here.

== Trains passing through Chalakudi railway station ==
No.	Train no.	Origin	Destination	Train name
1.	12512/12511	KOCHUVELI	Gorakhpur Junction	Raptisagar Express
2.	12522/12521	Ernakulam South	Barauni	Raptisagar Express
3.	16128/16127	Guruvayur	Chennai Egmore	Guruvayur Express
4.	16302/16301	Thiruvananthapuram Central	Shoranur Junction	Venad Express
5.	16305/16306	Ernakulam South	Kannur	Intercity Express
6.	16307/16308	Alappuzha	Kannur	Executive Express
7.	16341/16342	Guruvayur	Trivandrum	Guruvayur–Trivandrum Intercity Express
8.	56325/56326	Nilambur Road	Kottayam	Nilambur Road - Kottayam FAST PASSENGER
9.	16327/16328	Madurai	Guruvayur	Madurai - Guruvayur Express
10.	16347/16348	Trivandrum	Mangalore	Mangalore Express
11.	16381/16382	Pune	Kanyakumari	Jayanthi Janatha Express
12.	16525/16526	Kanyakumari	Bangalore	Island Express
13.	16606/16605	Thiruvananthapuram Central	Mangalore	Ernad Express
14.	16629/16630	Trivandrum	Mangalore	Malabar Express
15.	16649/16650	Mangalore	KANYAKUMARI	Parasuram Express
16.	16187/16188	Ernakulam South	Karaikal	Tea Garden Express
17.	22640/22639	Alappuzha	Chennai	Alleppey–Chennai Superfast Express
18.	22645/22646	Indore	Kochuveli	Ahilyanagari Express
19.	22647/22648	Korba	Kochuveli	Korba Superfast Express

No.	Train no.	Origin	Destination
1.	66319/66320	Shoranur	Ernakulam South (MEMU)
2.	66611/66612	Palakkad Jn	Ernakulam South (MEMU)
3.	56314/56315	Ernakulam South	Guruvayur
4.	56317/56318	Guruvayur	Ernakulam South

|16343/16344 THIRUVANANTHAPURAM MADURAI AMRITHA EXPRESS (EXPERIMENTAL)
