= Pudukad railway station =

Railway station in Kerala, India

Coordinates: 10.421°N 76.261°E

Pudukad
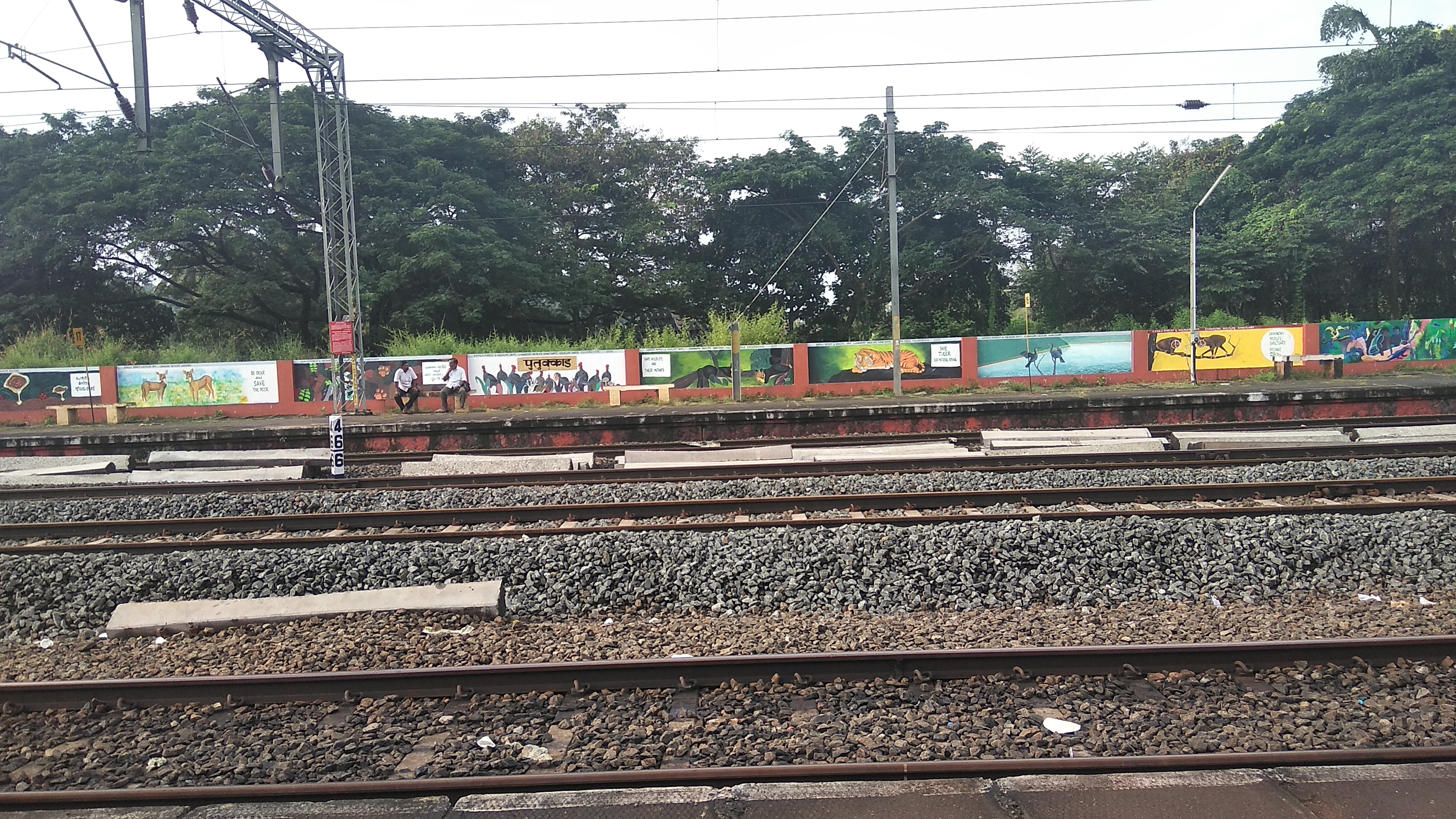

General information
- Location: Pudukad, Kerala, India
- System: Indian Railways station
- Owner: Indian Railways
- Platforms: 2
- Tracks: 5

Construction
- Parking: Available (Non roof)

Other information
- Station code: PUK
- Fare zone: Southern Railway

Services
Preceding station	Indian Railways	Following station
Ollur towards Shoranur Junction	Southern Railway zone Shoranur–Cochin Harbour section	Nellayi towards Cochin Harbour Terminus
Route map
Location
- Location within India Location within Kerala

Pudukad railway station (station code: PUK) is an NSG–6 category Indian railway station in Thiruvananthapuram railway division of Southern Railway zone. It falls between Ollur railway station and Nellayi railway station in the busy Shoranur–Cochin Harbour section in Thrissur district. A total of twenty trains including all passenger trains and some express trains stop here.

== Pudukkad Railway Crossing Delays ==
A video highlighting the delays at the Pudukkad railway level crossing can be found on YouTube.
