= Oushadhi =

Indian pharmaceutical company

- Type: Government-owned corporation
- Industry: Pharmaceutical industry
- Genre: Ayurveda
- Predecessor: Sree Kerala Varma Government Ayurvedic Pharmacy
- Founded: 1941
- Headquarters: Kuttanellur, Thrissur City, Thrissur City, Kerala, India
- Area served: India
- Key people: Sobhana George
- Products: Ayurvedic Medicines
- Revenue: Rs 40 crore
- Net income: Rs 6.69 crore
- Owner: Government of Kerala
- Parent: Government of Kerala
- Website: www.oushadhi.org

Oushadhi or Pharmaceutical Corporation (Indian Medicines) Kerala Ltd is an Ayurvedic medicine manufacturing company situated in Kuttanellur, in Thrissur City of Kerala state. It is a fully Government of Kerala owned company and produces around 450 ayurvedic formulations.

== History ==
Oushadhi (The Pharmaceutical Corporation I.M Kerala Ltd) originated as Sree Kerala Varma Government Ayurvedic Pharmacy in 1941 at the instance of His Highness Kerala Varma VI the Maharaja of Cochin from 1941 to 1943. He is also known as Midukkan Thampuran, a well known Ayurvedic physician with in-depth knowledge of Sanskrit and specialized in "Vishavaidyam" (Poison treatment). In 1975, the company was registered and renamed as "The Pharmaceutical Corporation (Indian Medicines) Kerala Ltd" Thrissur. Smt. Sobhana George is the current chairperson and Dr. T K Hrideek is the current MD of Oushadhi.

== Activities ==
Oushadhi has two factories at Kuttanellur, Thrissur City and Pariyaram in Kannur District. The company has established 30-bed Pancha Karma Hospital and Research Institute at Thrissur City and a specialty centre for Ayurveda and Yoga at Sasthamangalam near Thiruvananthapuram. Oushadhi is also supplying Ayurvedic medicines to 1,035 Government hospitals, dispensaries and five other states at concessional prices. The company also owns two medicinal plant nurseries at Kuttanellur and Pariyaram. Oushadhi has Agencies across Kerala, including one started in Bangalore called Oushadhi Ayurvedic Centre the first authorized agency in Karnataka State.
