= Guruvayur–Thrissur spur line =

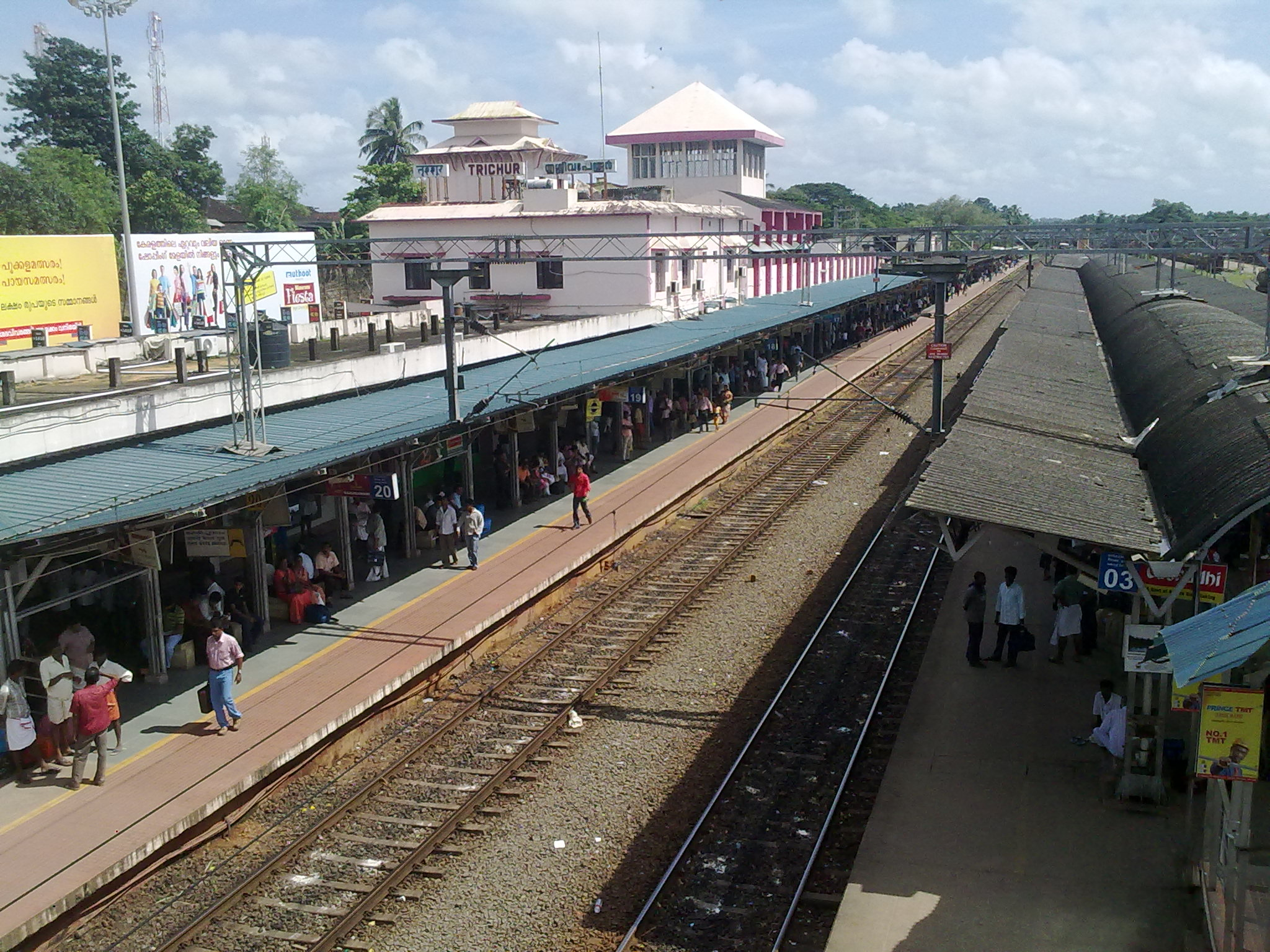
- View of Thrissur railway station

Overview
- Status: Operational
- Owner: Southern Railway zone
- Locale: Thrissur district
- Termini: Thrissur; Guruvayur
- Stations: 2
- Website: http://www.sr.indianrailways.gov.in/

Service
- Type: Regional rail
- System: Electrified
- Services: 3
- Operator(s): Thiruvananthapuram railway division
- Depot(s): Thrissur
- Rolling stock: WAP-4, WAP-7, WAG-5

History
- Opened: 9 January 1994; 31 years ago

Technical
- Line length: 23 kilometres (14 mi)
- Track length: 90 km
- Number of tracks: 1
- Character: single-line
- Track gauge: 1,676 mm (5 ft 6 in)
- Electrification: Fully
- Operating speed: 90 km/h (56 mph)

Guruvayur–Thrissur section is a spur line functioning under Trivandrum railway division of Southern Railway zone. This is a single broad-gauge line which begins at Thrissur city and ends at Guruvayur in Thrissur district of Kerala. The 23 kilometres (14 mi) section was opened for traffic in the year 1994. The line connects the Cultural Capital of Kerala, Thrissur to the Temple Town of Kerala, Guruvayur, the fourth biggest temple in India in terms of the number of devotees per day.

== History ==
In 1983, Kamalapati Tripathi, then Minister of Railways (India) announced the construction of Thrissur–Guruvayur–Kuttippuram section. But following stiff opposition from the local people, Kuttipuram was dropped. On 19 January 1985 Indian Railways officially notifies Guruvayur–Tanur line for construction as temple town is a notified pilgrimage area. Rajiv Gandhi, then Prime Minister of India in 1987 inaugurated the first alignment line of Guruvayur–Tanur section.

On 9 January 1994 the first phase of the Thrissur–Guruvayur section was inaugurated by Prime Minister of India, Narasimha Rao. On 17 December 1995, Suresh Kalmadi and then Chief Minister of Kerala K Karunakaran inaugurated the work for the Guruvayur–Kuttipuram line. But later Kuttipuram was dropped once more and Indian Railways in 1997 give the green signal for Guruvayur–Tanur line. 51.25 km Guruvayur–Tanur railway line survey report was submitted to Indian Railways in July 1998. The project was sanctioned in 1999. The final surveys were done for the Guruvayur–Tanur railway line in January 2003, which will cover 51 km. In October 2009, Guruvayur–Tirunavaya alignment was chosen by Indian Railways.

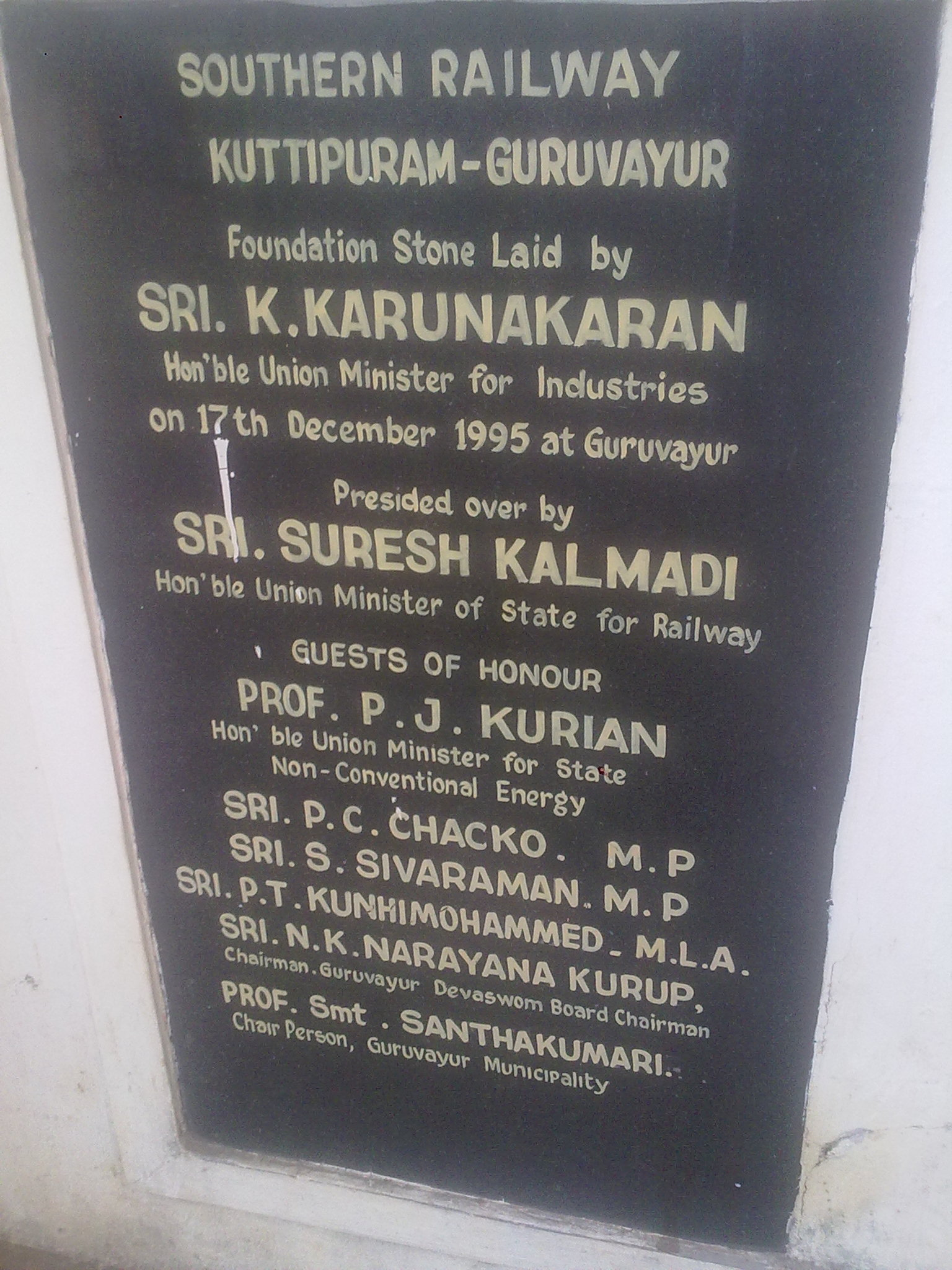
Commemorative plaque of Kuttipuram–Guruvayoor section in Guruvayoor railway station

== Trains ==
Towards Guruvayur

1. 16327 MDU GUV Exp.

Thrissur: 01.25 am; Guruvayur: 02.10 am

2. 16127 MS GUV Exp

Thrissur: 07.00 am; Guruvayur: 07.40 am

3. 16342 TVC GUV Exp.

Thrissur: 23.20 pm; Guruvayur: 00.25 am.

Towards Thrissur

1.16341 GUV TVC Exp.

Guruvayur: 03.25 am; Thrissur: 03.50 am.

2.16328 GUV MDU Exp.

Guruvayur: 05.50 am; Thrissur: 06.17 am.

3. 16128 GUV CHENNAI Exp.

Guruvayur: 23.15 pm; Thrissur: 23.40 pm.
