= Sobha Topaz =

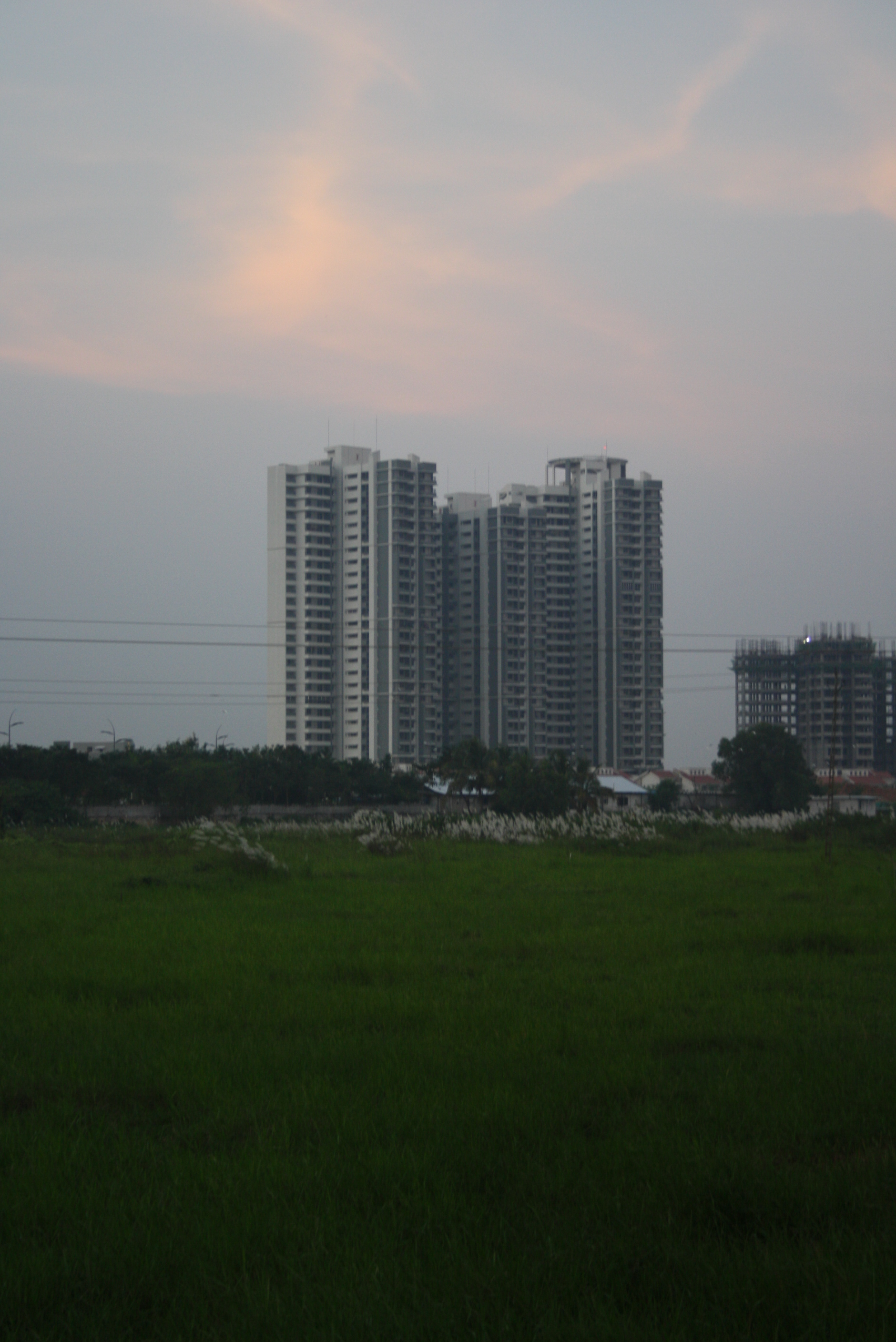
- A view from Guruvayoor-Thrissur Road

General information
- Status: Completed
- Type: Super Luxury Residential Apartments
- Location: Thrissur, India
- Construction started: 2004
- Completed: 2012
- Opening: 2012
- Owner: Sobha Developers Ltd

Height
- Roof: 97.90 m (321 ft)
- Top floor: 28

Technical details
- Floor count: 27

Design and construction
- Developer: Sobha Developers Ltd
- Structural engineer: Sobha Developers Ltd
- Main contractor: Sobha Developers Ltd

Sobha Topaz is a super luxury residential skyscraper situated in Sobha City in Thrissur city of Kerala State. It is the tallest residential skyscraper in Thrissur city. The building consists of 216 luxury apartments in 27 stories. The project was developed by Sobha Developers Ltd.

The project was chosen by the jury of Construction Week India Awards 2012 as the runner-up for the "High-Rise Project of the Year".
