= Thrissur railway station =

Southern railway zone

Thrissur Trichur
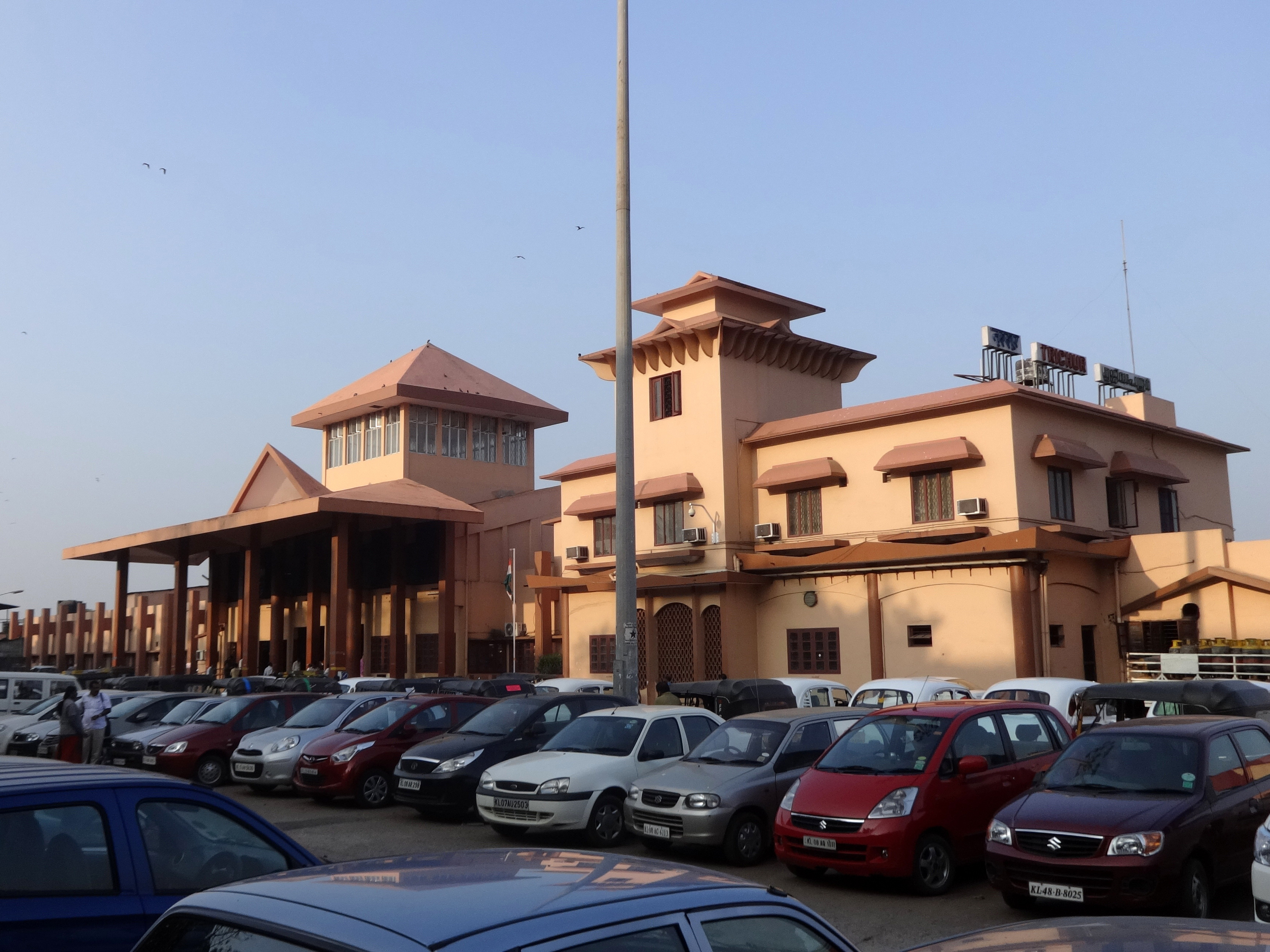
- Thrissur railway station

General information
- Location: Kokkalai, Thrissur, Thrissur District, Kerala, India
- Coordinates: 10.515°N 76.208°E
- System: Indian Railways station
- Owner: Indian Railways
- Lines: Shoranur–Cochin Harbour section, Guruvayur–Thrissur spur line
- Platforms: 4
- Tracks: 6
- Connections: Taxi stand, Cycle stand and Auto stand

Construction
- Structure type: Standard on-ground station
- Depth: 600 m (2,000 ft)
- Platform levels: 1
- Parking: Yes
- Cycle facilities: Yes
- Accessible: Available

Other information
- Status: Functioning
- Station code: TCR
- Zone(s): Southern Railway zone
- Division(s): Thiruvananthapuram

History
- Opened: 2 June 1902; 124 years ago
- Closed: 1943
- Rebuilt: 1971
- Former names: Madras and Southern Mahratta Railway

Passengers
- 2018–19: 18,580 passengers per day ▲100%
- Rank: 6 (in Kerala); 4 (in Trivandrum division)

Services
Preceding station	Indian Railways	Following station
Punkunnam towards Shoranur Junction	Southern Railway zone Shoranur–Cochin Harbour section	Ollur towards Cochin Harbour Terminus
Route map
Location
- Interactive map

Thrissur railway station (station code: TCR) is an NSG–2 category Indian railway station in Thiruvananthapuram railway division of Southern Railway zone. It is a railway station in Kerala, India. Thrissur also is known as the Cultural Capital of Kerala. Thrissur railway station is a major railway head in South India and A1 classified station operated by the Southern Railway zone of the Indian Railways and comes under the Thiruvananthapuram railway division. It is one of the busiest railway station in Kerala state in terms of rail traffic with 189 halting trains. At ₹97 crore (equivalent to ₹121 crore or US$13 million in 2023) in financial year 2018–19, it is the fourth largest in terms of passenger revenues in Kerala and the eighth largest in Southern Railway. Daily trains are available to Mumbai, New Delhi, Kolkata, Bangalore, Chennai, Mangalore, and Hyderabad. This station lies on the Shoranur–Cochin Harbour section, which is one of the busiest railway corridors in Kerala. It has three satellite stations, Punkunnam railway station and two minor stations, Ollur railway station and Mulankunnathukavu railway station. Thrissur railway station also connects to the temple town of Guruvayur by Thrissur–Guruvayur section.

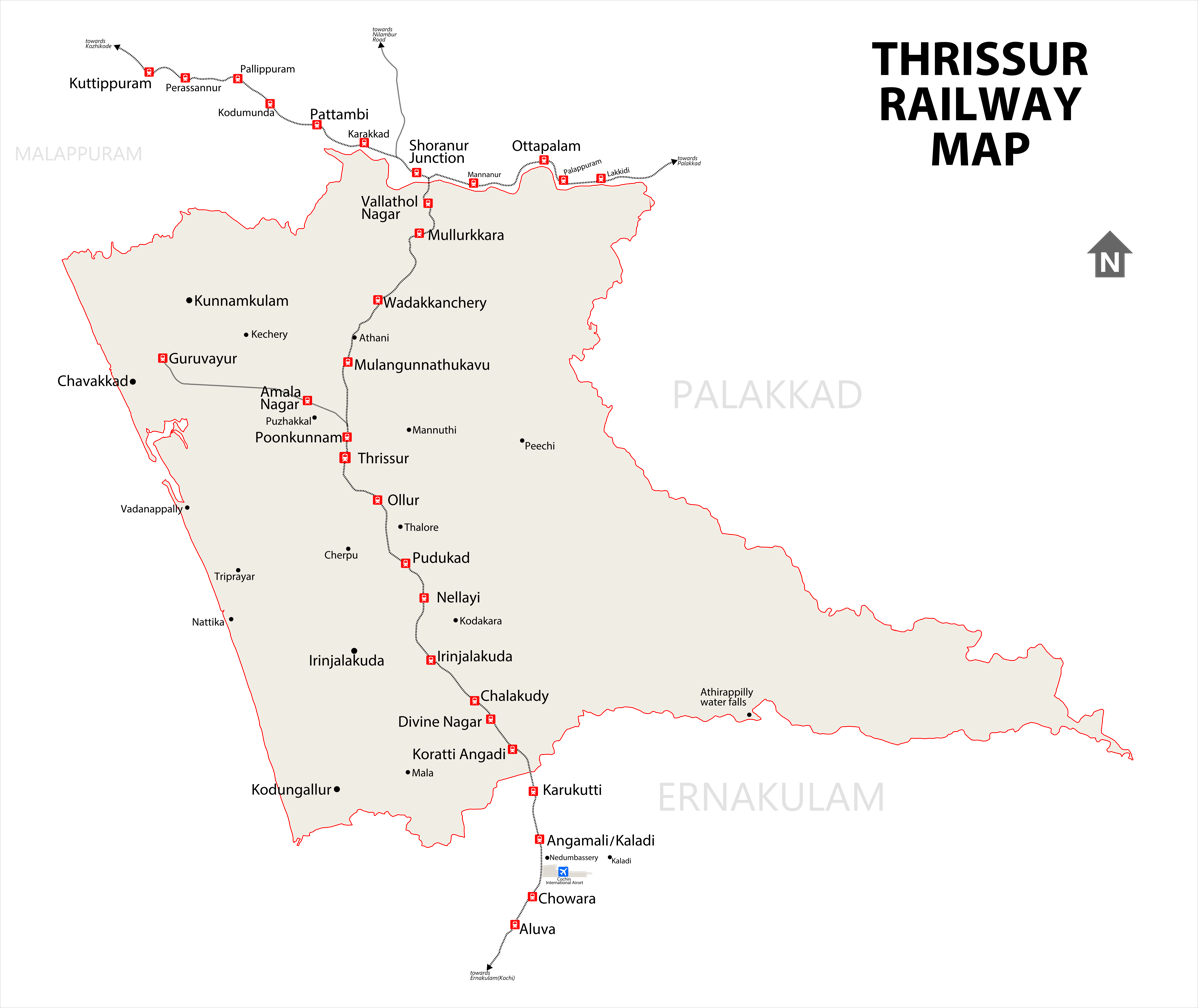
Thrissur Railway Map

== Layout ==
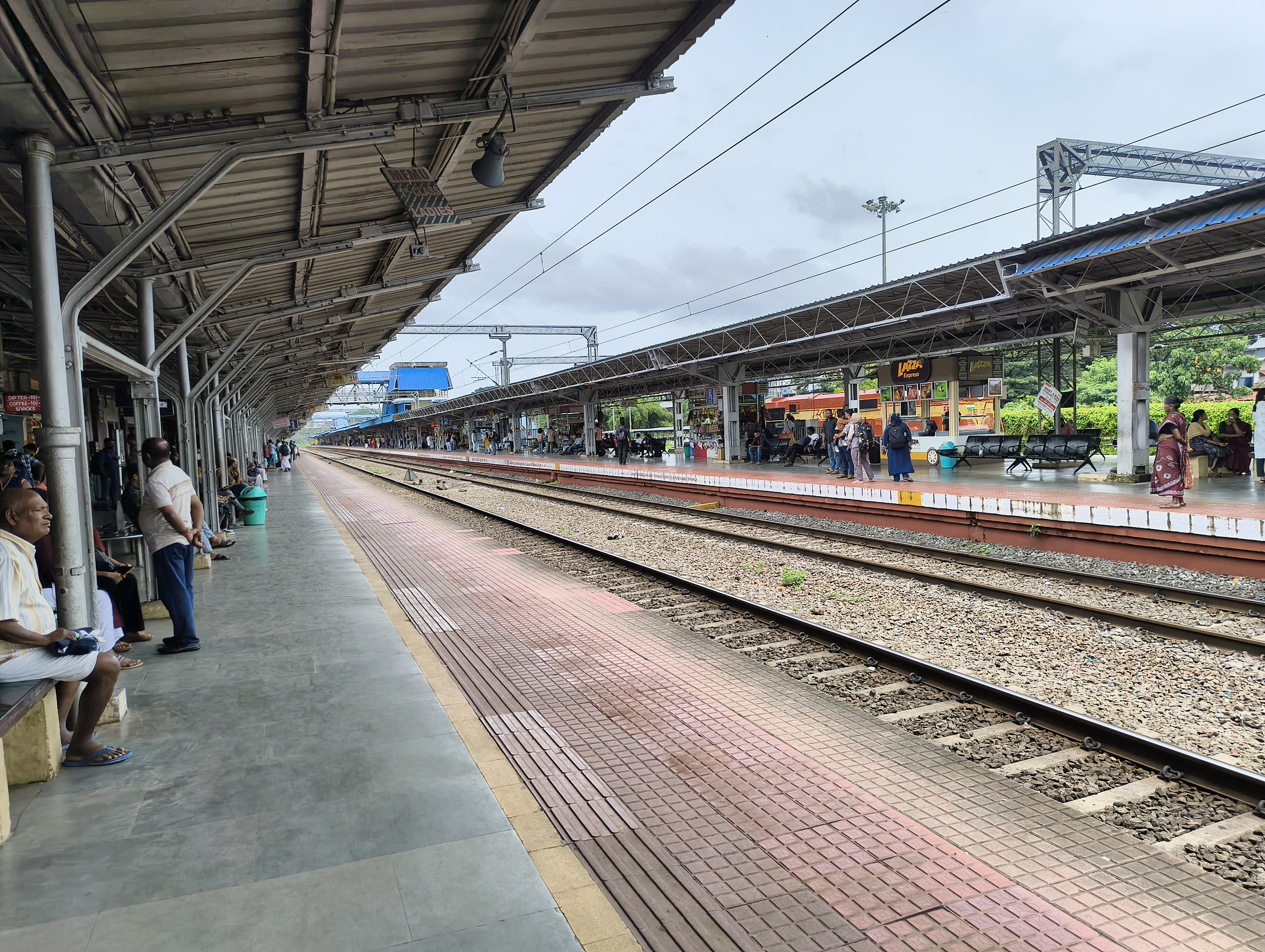
Platform of Thrissur Railway Station

The station has four platforms and two entrances, one at the eastern side which is the main entrance and the second one at western side which was opened in 2010. The station can be easily accessed from Kottappuram side and the KSRTC transport bus stand side. It has three railway over bridges connecting first platform to the second, third and fourth platforms. The station operate passenger trains and goods trains.

== Major trains halting at Thrissur ==
- Kasaragod–Thiruvananthapuram Vande Bharat Express (via Kottayam)
- Mangaluru Central–Thiruvananthapuram Vande Bharat Express (via Alappuzha)
- KSR Bengaluru–Ernakulam Junction Vande Bharat Express
- Chennai Alappuzha Superfast Express
- Visakhapatnam Kollam bi-weekly Express
- Patna Ernakulam Superfast Express
- Rajdhani Express
- Madurai Thiruvananthapuram Amritha Express
- Yeshwantpur Kochuveli Garib Rath Express
- Hatia Ernakulam Dharthi Aaba AC Superfast Express
- Thiruvananthapuram Secunderabad Shabari Express
- Dhanbad Alappuzha Bokaro Express
- Thiruvananthapuram Chennai Superfast AC Express
- Madras Thiruvananthapuram Mail
- Palakkad Tirunelveli Palaruvi Express
- Palakkad Ernakulam MEMU Passenger
- Karaikal Ernakulam Tea Garden Express
- Jayanthi Janatha Express
- Malabar & Maveli Express
- Chennai Thiruvananthapuram Superfast Express
- LTT Kochuveli Garib Rath Express
- Ernakulam Shoranur MEMU
- Venad Express
- Nethravathi Express
- Goa Ernakulam Express

== Facilities ==
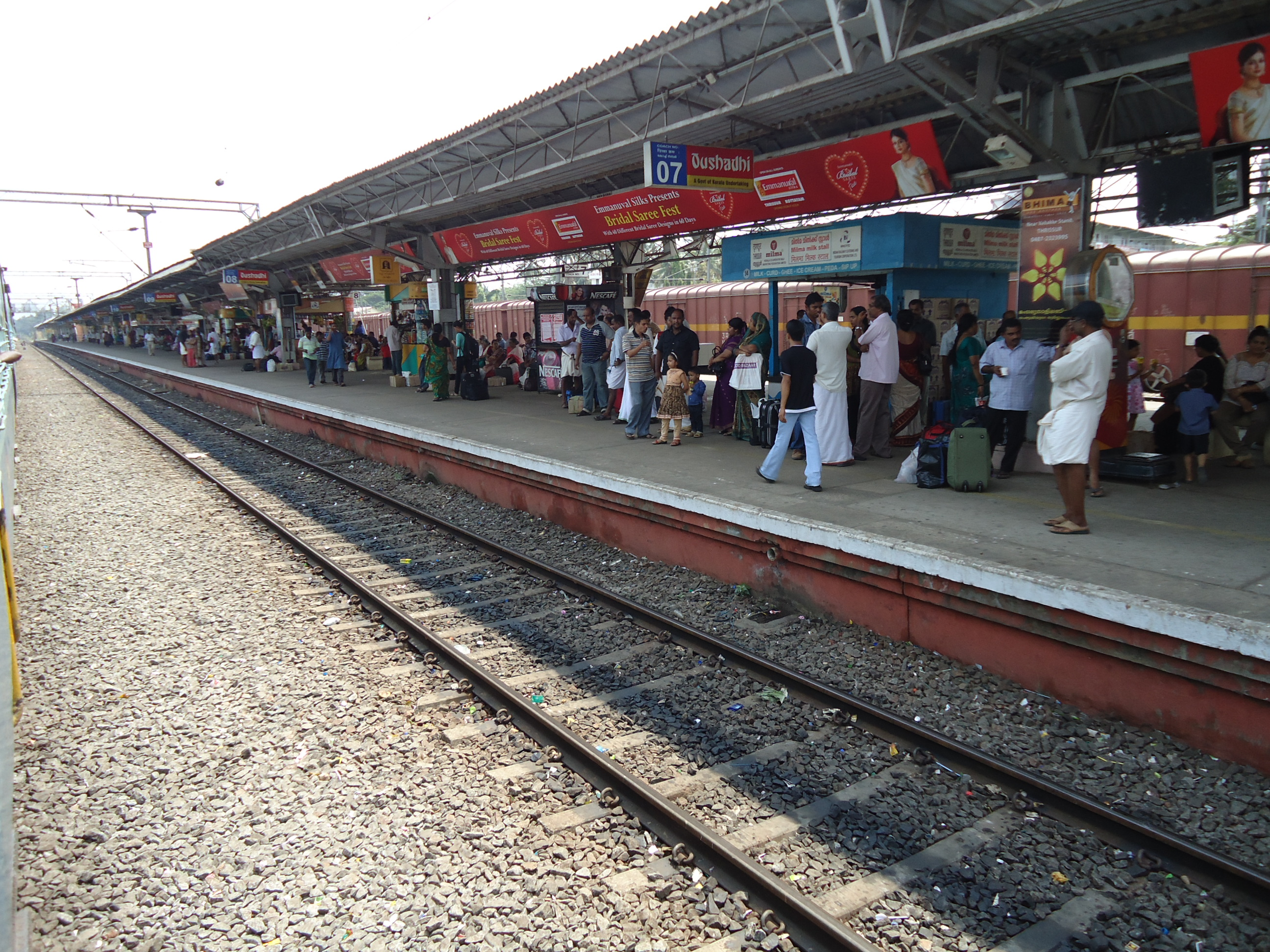
Passengers waiting for the train at the platform No 2 at the Thrissur railway station

- Tickets

The station has five counters for non-reservation tickets in the east side, two ticket counters in the west side and ten automatic ticket vending machines (ATVM) in east also. The reservation counters for the long-distance is situated in the eastern side with four counters in a separate building.

- Waiting halls

The station has an air-conditioned and non-air-conditioned waiting hall for first-class and sleeper class passengers. The round-the-clock air-conditioned waiting hall is maintained with the cooperation of the Kudumbasree Mission. The hall has facilities such as TV, toilet, library, and kids entertainment section are there.

- Google free Wi-Fi

The passengers can access free Wi-fi facility inside the station provided by Google and railwire

- Retiring rooms

The station has four retiring beds in air conditioned Double Bed category (Season price: 840, Non-Season price: 700); eight beds in air-conditioned Dormitory category (S-240, NS180) and one Non-air conditioned Single Bed category (S-390, NS-325).

- Parking

Paid four wheeler and two-wheeler parking is available in the east and west entrance of the station. Pre-paid autorickshaw services are also made to the passengers.

- Food

The station also provides vegetarian and non-vegetarian food through the 1,830 sqft multi-cuisine food plaza.

- Foot overbridges

The station has three foot overbridges. One in the centre of the station and second and third in the south and north of the station.

There is a computer-controlled coach guidance system and a plasma screen for display of information to passengers.

Other facilities available are Parcel booking office, Railway Mailing service (RMS) office, State Bank of India and Canara Bank Automated teller machine (ATMs).

== Railway Police Station ==
Thrissur railway station has a railway police station with a Circle Inspector as the head and one Sub Inspectors. For the security of passengers, the Indian Railways have installed 21 high definition cameras which cover all the platforms and the ticket counters which is connected to the main system. There are two 42 inch LCD monitors which monitor all the visuals in the station.

== Future expansion plans ==
The Southern Railways is planning to quadruple the Shoranur–Cochin Harbour section by setting up a third and fourth line. The new line will cater to the International Container Transshipment Terminal, Kochi. A pedestrian flyover platform connecting all the platforms to the nearby KSRTC bus station is being planned.

The Thrissur Railway Station will undergo a significant modernization project to bring it up to international standards. The Indian Railways has allocated ₹393.57 crore for the station's redevelopment. The Thiruvananthapuram Division of Southern Railway, through its official social media handle, has confirmed the project's aim to create a world-class railway station with state-of-the-art facilities in Thrissur. This project stands as a notable undertaking for Southern Railways.

=== Project Details ===
The renovation plans include a spacious 36-meter-wide air concourse and a hotel, with the overall design drawing inspiration from modern airports. This initiative aligns with the Central Government's Amrit Bharat Station project, which aims to enhance and modernize railway stations across the country. Notably, the project strives to strike a balance between preserving Thrissur's cultural heritage, known as Kerala's cultural capital, while integrating modern amenities. The new station will encompass a built-up area of approximately 54,330 square meters.

The project will boast a range of cutting-edge facilities designed to enhance passenger convenience. This includes the installation of 19 new elevators and 10 escalators, significantly reducing wait times and facilitating faster platform access. Additionally, the project will incorporate modern terminal facilities similar to those found in major airports.

To enhance passenger experience and accessibility, Thrissur Railway Station will undergo significant renovations. This project includes:

Ample Parking: A multi-level car parking system is being constructed adjacent to the station, expanding the parking area from 2,520 square meters to a spacious 10,653 square meters. This will significantly reduce parking congestion and improve convenience for travelers.

Improved Connectivity: A direct entry point from the main road is being planned to facilitate easier access to the station.

Enhanced Amenities: The project incorporates the development of commercial buildings, including a new hotel conveniently located within the station itself. These additions aim to create a more comprehensive and convenient travel hub for passengers.

Air Terminal Construction: A 36-meter air terminal is also under development, further establishing Thrissur as a major transportation center.

By implementing these improvements, Thrissur Railway Station aims to become a more user-friendly transportation hub for passengers.

=== The Amrit Bharat Station Scheme ===
Launched in February 2023 by the Ministry of Railways, the Amrit Bharat Station Scheme is a nationwide initiative to redevelop 1,275 railway stations. This ambitious project represents a significant undertaking for Indian Railways. The scheme leverages synergies with other key government programs, including BharatNet, One Station One Product, Make in India, and Bharatmala, to achieve its goals.

== See also ==
- Ollur railway station
- Punkunnam railway station
- Guruvayur railway station
- Mulankunnathukavu railway station
- Thrissur Railway Passengers’ Association

== Image Gallery ==
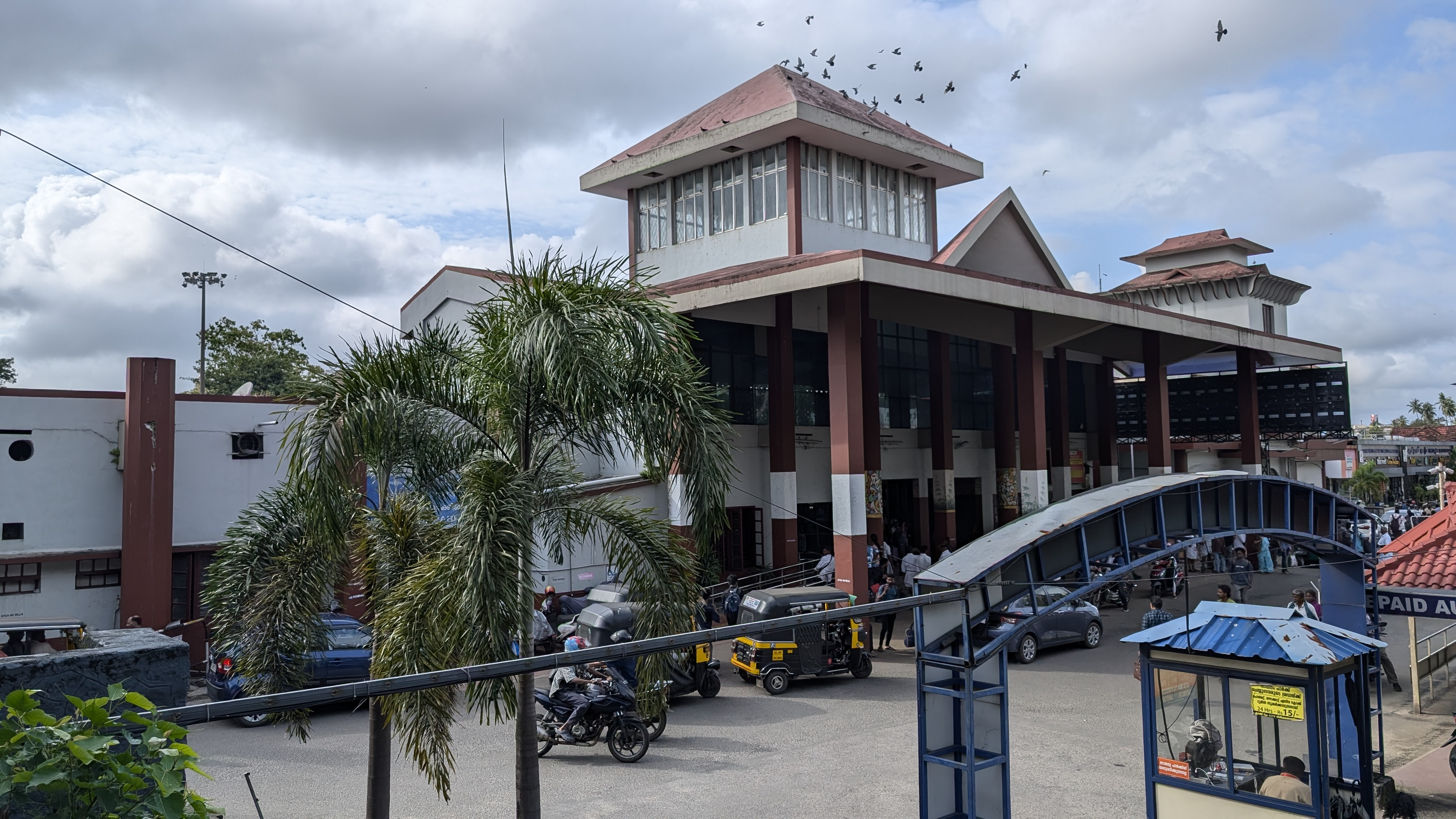
In 2024
