= Kuttanellur =

Kuttanellur Kuttanellur
- Neighbourhood
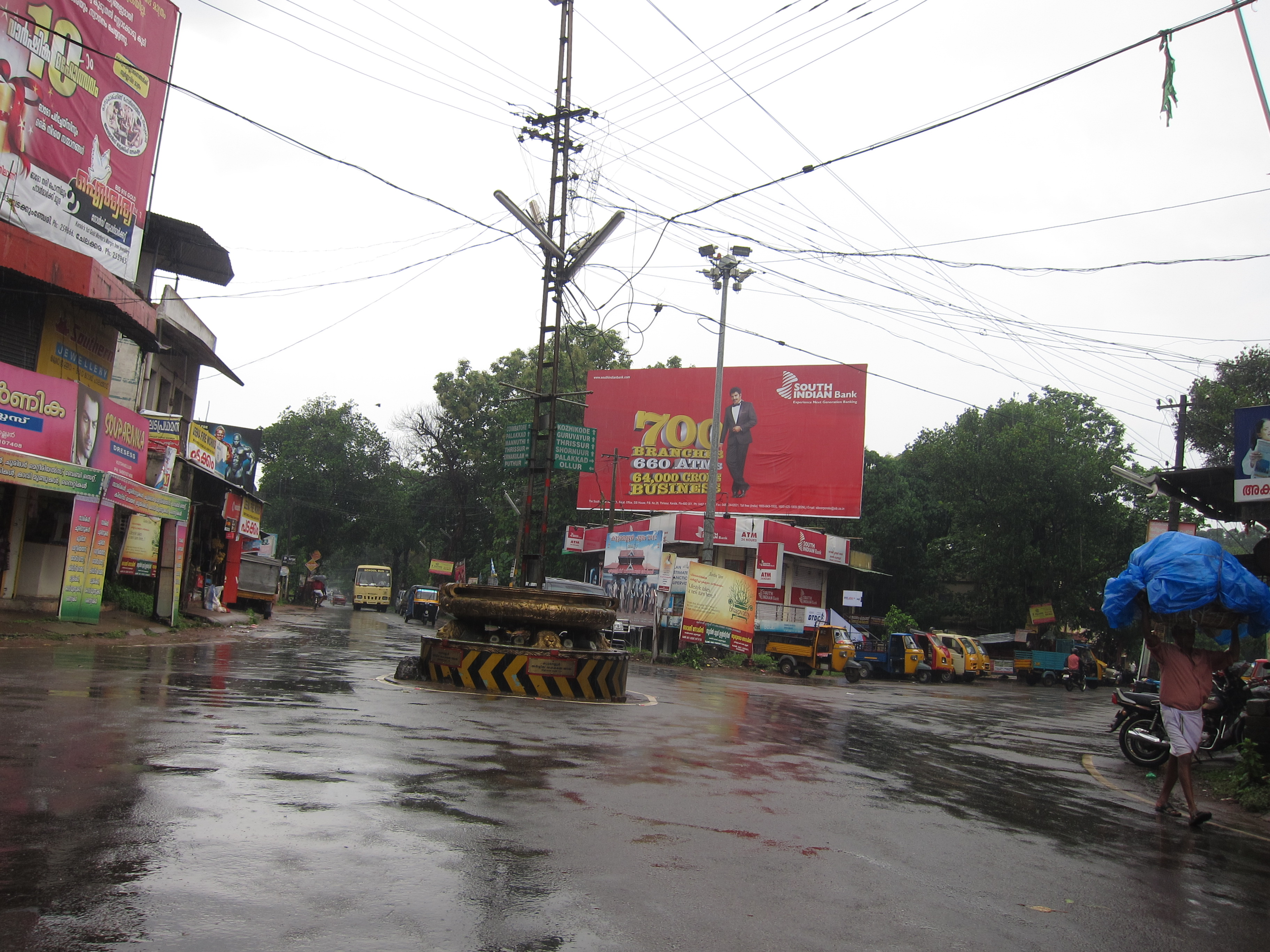
- Kuttanelloor - കുട്ടനെല്ലൂർ

- Location in Kerala, India
- Coordinates: 10°30′0″N 76°15′25″E
- Country: India
- State: Kerala
- District: Thrissur

Languages
  - Official: Malayalam, English
- Time zone: UTC+5:30 (IST)
- PIN: 680014
- Vehicle registration: KL-08
- Nearest city: Thrisssur

Kuttanellur is a residential area situated in the City of Thrissur in Kerala state of India. Kuttanellur is Ward 27 of Thrissur Municipal Corporation. It is around 6 km away from the Swaraj Round. Kuttanellur is home to Oushadhi, a Kerala Government undertaking for manufacturing Ayurvedic medicines and a Government Arts College. It is accessible from Thrissur city and via NH 544, connecting Thrissur with Ernakulam. This national highway passes through Kuttanaellur, where there is a highway bridge. The proposed Thrissur Zoological Park at Puthur is in four kilometers from Kuttanellur Bypass Junction. Nearest suburban areas are Mannuthy and Ollur. It is famous for its Bhagavathi temple and the annual Kuttanellur Pooram. Kuttanellur is home to Oushadhi, a Kerala Government undertaking for manufacturing Ayurvedic medicines and Sri C. Achutha Menon Government College.

== See also ==
- Thrissur
- Thrissur District
