= Sri C. Achutha Menon Government College =

College in Kerala, India

Sri C. Achutha Menon Government College, Thrissur
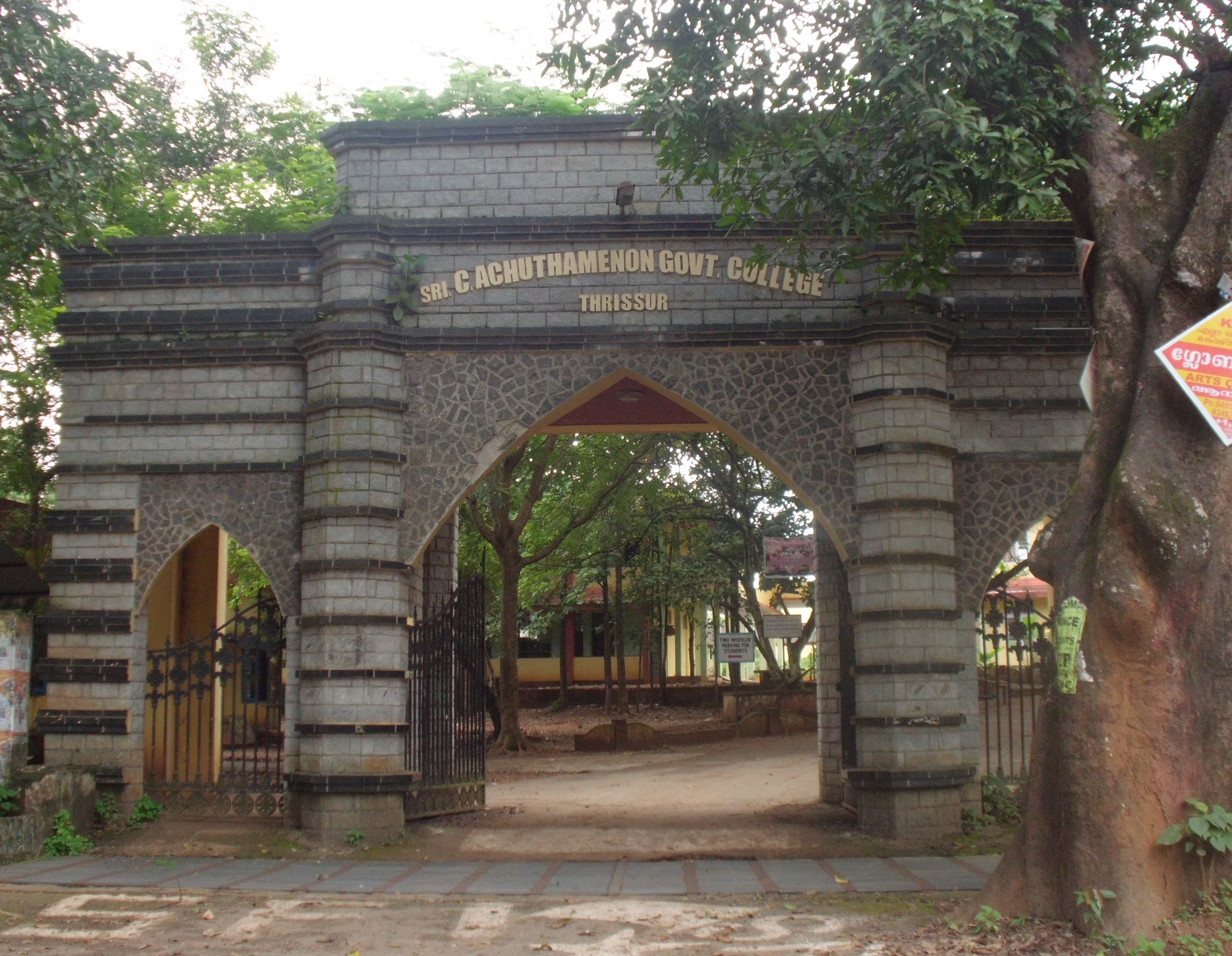
- Motto: Tamaso ma jyothirgamaya
- Type: Government College
- Established: 1972
- Affiliations: University of Calicut
- Principal: Suresh A K
- Location: Thrissur, Kerala, India
- Website: http://www.govtcollegethrissur.ac.in/

Sri C. Achutha Menon Government College is situated in Kuttanellur, in Thrissur city of Kerala in India. The college is affiliated to the University of Calicut and has hostel facilities. The college provides bachelor's degree courses in various streams like arts, commerce and science.

== History ==
Thrissur Government College was established in 1972. The college started functioning in the present Government Training College premises on 14 August 1972 with 200 students and 9 teachers. Prof. Subbayyan T R was the first principal. The courses offered were one Pre – Degree batch each for the 3rd and 4th Groups and Degree courses in History and Economics. The college, affiliated to the Calicut University, was formally inaugurated by the then Chief Minister, the Late C. Achutha Menon on 28 October 1972. Two more courses, viz. B.A English and B.Com. were started in 1976 and 1978respectively. The introduction of the M.Com. course in 1984 elevated the institution to the level of a Post-graduate college.

In recognition of the good performance of the college and its potential for development, it was resolved to shift the college to a 25-acre land campus of its own at Kuttanellur. The foundation stone for the new building was laid by Sri. K. Karunakaran, the then Chief Minister, on 20 April 1985. In 1991, the college shifted to the new campus. After the shifting of the college, it started three new Post-Graduate courses of History, Economics and English in 1995, 1996 and 1998 respectively. In the year 1997, which was its Silver Jubilee year, the college was renamed Sri. C Achutha Menon Govt. College, after the late Chief Minister.

== Departments ==
- Commerce and Management Studies
- Economics
- English
- History
- Hindi
- Malayalam
- Sanskrit
- Statistics
- Political Science
- Physical Education
- Computer Science
- Psychology
- Maths

== Academic courses ==
This college offers both undergraduate and post graduate courses.

Under-Graduate Courses

- B A Economics
- B A English
- B A History
- B B A
- B.Com.
- Bsc Computer Science
- Bsc Psychology
- Bsc Statistics

Post-Graduate Courses

- M A Economics
- M A English
- M A History
- M.Com.
- Msc Psychology

== Notable alumni ==
- K. P. Rajendran, Ex Minister for Revenue and Land Reforms - State of Kerala
