= Ollur railway station =

Railway station in Kerala, India

Ollur
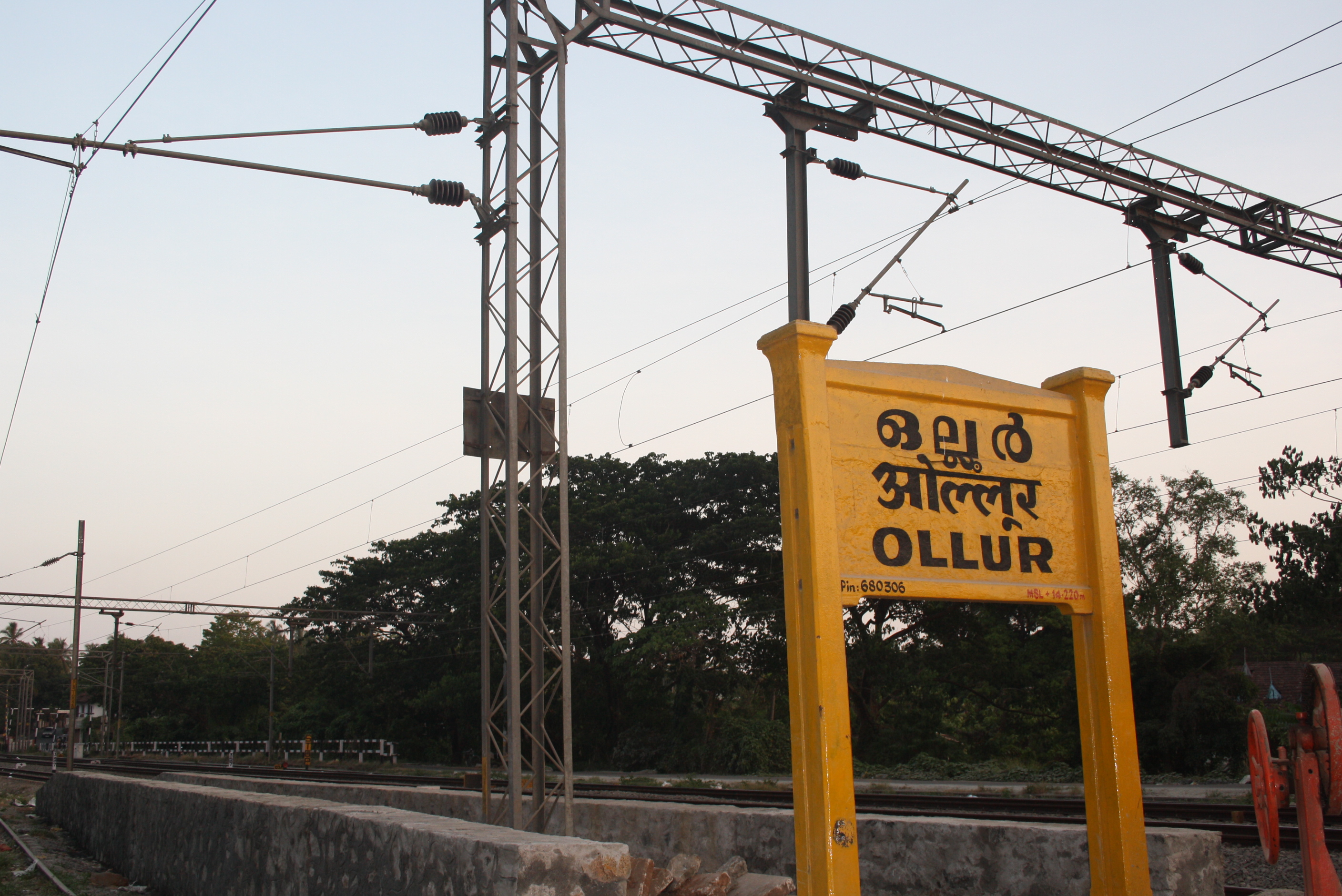
- Ollur railway station

General information
- Location: Ollur, Thrissur, Kerala, India
- Coordinates: 10.474°N 76.237°E
- System: Regional rail and Light rail station
- Owner: Indian Railways
- Line: Shoranur–Cochin Harbour section
- Platforms: 1
- Tracks: 4

Construction
- Structure type: Standard on-ground station
- Depth: 43 ft (13 m)
- Parking: Available
- Cycle facilities: Not Available

Other information
- Station code: OLR
- Fare zone: Southern Railway zone

History
- Opened: 2 June 1902; 124 years ago
- Former names: Madras and Southern Mahratta Railway

Passengers
- 500

Services
Preceding station	Indian Railways	Following station
Thrissur towards Shoranur Junction	Southern Railway zone Shoranur–Cochin Harbour section	Pudukad towards Cochin Harbour Terminus
Route map
Location

Ollur railway station (station code: OLR) is an NSG–6 category Indian railway station in Thiruvananthapuram railway division of Southern Railway zone. It falls between Thrissur railway station and Pudukad railway station in the busy Shoranur–Cochin Harbour section of Trivandrum railway division.

== History ==
Ollur railway station traces its history to 1902, when Shoranur–Cochin railway line was built during the rule of Rama Varma XV of Cochin Royal Family. The British bought the land and the house of Moyalan Varghees for Rs.50 to construct the Ollur railway station.
