= Thiruvananthapuram railway division =

Railway division of India

Thiruvananthapuram Railway Division (TVC)
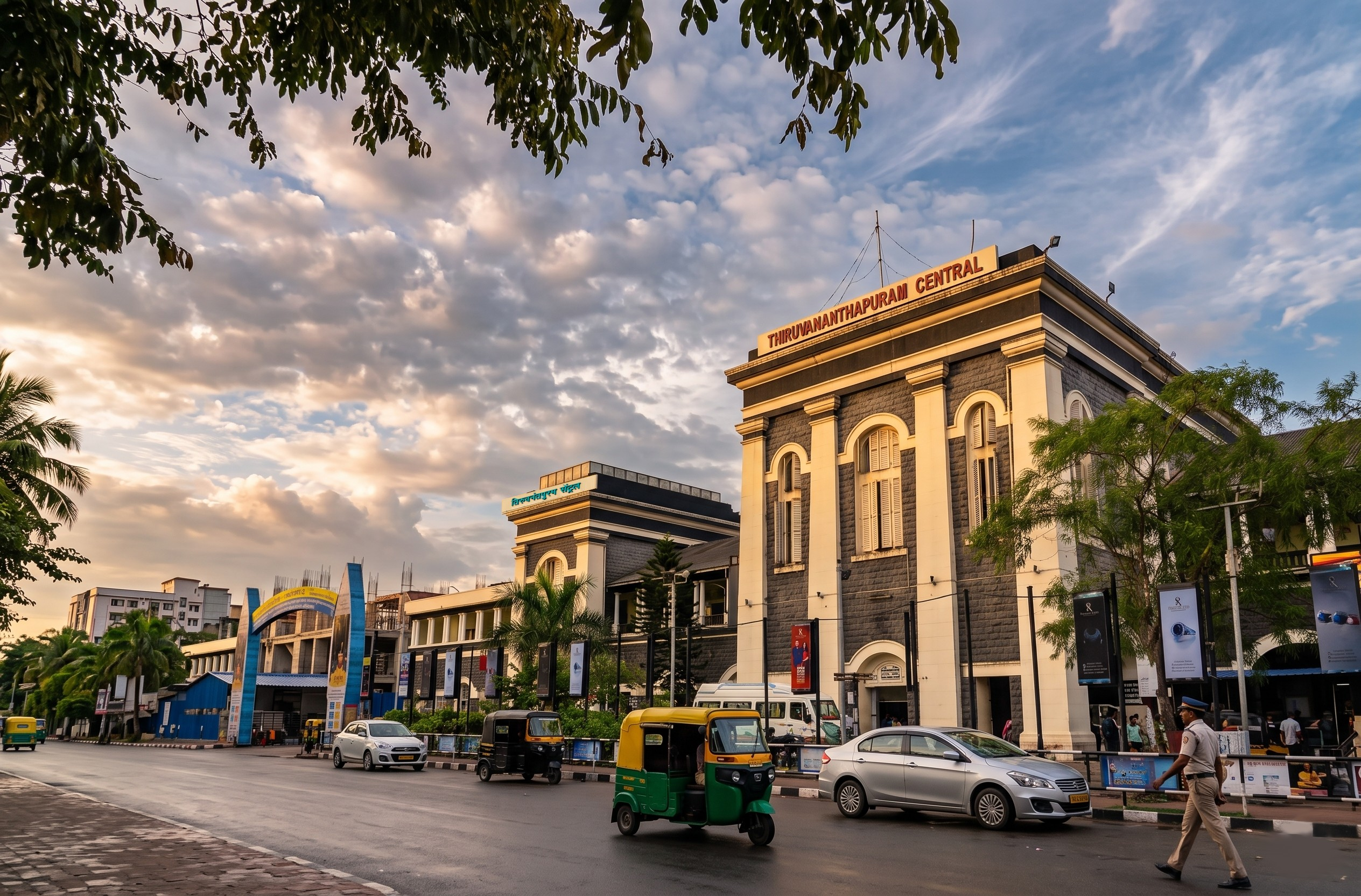
- Thiruvananthapuram Central Station

Overview
- Headquarters: Thiruvananthapuram, Kerala, India
- Locale: Kerala, Tamil Nadu
- Dates of operation: 2 October 1979–

Technical
- Track gauge: 1,676 mm (5 ft 6 in)
- Previous gauge: 1,000 mm (3 ft 3 3/8 in)
- Electrification: 25 kV AC 50 Hz
- Length: 625 km

Thiruvananthapuram Railway Division (TVC) is one of the six administrative divisions in Southern Railway zone of the Indian Railways. It has its headquarters at Thiruvananthapuram. It was formed on 2 October 1979, which serves the eight districts of southern part of Kerala, Kanyakumari district and part of Tirunelveli district. With 104 stations in its territorial jurisdiction, it is the fourth largest out of six divisions in Southern Railway.

== History ==
In the 1978–79 Railway Budget, Minister of Railways Madhu Dandavate proposed the creation of a new division of Southern Railway headquartered at Trivandrum (now Thiruvananthapuram). Formation and Jurisdictional Deliberations Following the initial announcement in the 1978–79 Railway Budget to establish a new Southern Railway division headquartered at Trivandrum (now Thiruvananthapuram), the proposal encountered widespread opposition from regional stakeholders in North Malabar, Cochin, and Olavakkot (Palghat) over territorial division. Protests primarily focused on the proposed inclusion of the Mangalore–Ernakulam section in the new division. Excluding the Mangalore–Ernakulam line significantly reduced the proposed division's total route kilometrage, rendering it commercially non-viable. To resolve this, the Railway Board proposed a transitional step to create a limited "Transportation Division" covering only the broad-gauge Shoranur–Trivandrum–Kanyakumari–Tirunelveli route. This limited division was intended to expand into a full-fledged administrative division as additional broad-gauge trackage became available.Because the interim Transportation Division proposal also failed to gain broad consensus, the Ministry of Railways requested the Chief Minister of Kerala to mediate among local political factions and regional interests to determine a viable and mutually acceptable jurisdictional compromise.

It is the southernmost railway division of India and manages 625 km of route track and 108 railway stations in the states of Kerala and Tamil Nadu. The major stations of the division are Thiruvananthapuram Central, Ernakulam Junction, Kollam Junction, Thrissur, Alappuzha, Kottayam, Ernakulam Town, Chengannur, Kayamkulam, Aluva, Nagercoil Junction, Kanniyakumari, Tiruvalla, Kochuveli and Varkala.

== Major routes ==
- Kollam–Thiruvananthapuram trunk line
- Shoranur-Ernakulam line
- Thiruvananthapuram–Nagercoil–Kanyakumari line
- Ernakulam-Kayamkulam coastal line
- Ernakulam-Kollam line (via Kottayam and Kayamkulam)
- Thrissur-Guruvayur line

== Stations ==
The list includes the stations under the Thiruvananthapuram railway division and their station category.

| Category of station | No. of stations | Names of stations |
|---|---|---|
| NSG-1 Category | 0 | - |
| NSG-2 Category | 5 | Thiruvananthapuram Central, Ernakulam Junction, Thrissur, Kollam Junction, Ernakulam Town |
| NSG-3 Category | 10 | Kochuveli (Thiruvananthapuram North), Aluva, Kottayam, Chengannur, Nagercoil Junction, Kayamkulam Junction, Alappuzha, Kanniyakumari, Varkala Sivagiri,Tiruvalla |
| NSG-4 Category | 5 | Changanasseri, Karunagappalli,Tripunithura, Angamaly, Guruvayur |
| NSG-5 Category | 18 | Nagercoil town, Mavelikara Paravur etc. |
| NSG-6 Category | 27 | Nemom (Thiruvananthapuram South), Pudukad etc. |
| HG 1 Category | 0 | - |
| HG 2 Category | 17 | Koratty Angadi, Divine Nagar |
| HG 3 Category | 18 | - |
| Total | 103 | - |

== Terminal facilities ==
Thiruvananthapuram railway division has the credit of building and maintaining highest number of passenger terminals in any railway division within southern railway. Passenger terminals are operational at Alappuzha, Ernakulam Jn, Thiruvananthapuram Central, Kollam Jn, Nagercoil Jn, Kanyakumari and Thiruvanathapuram North.

New passenger terminal is proposed at Nemom which serves as alternate satellite terminal station to the Thiruvananthapuram Central to ease the congestion other than the present Thiruvanathapuram North station.

== MEMU/suburban trains ==
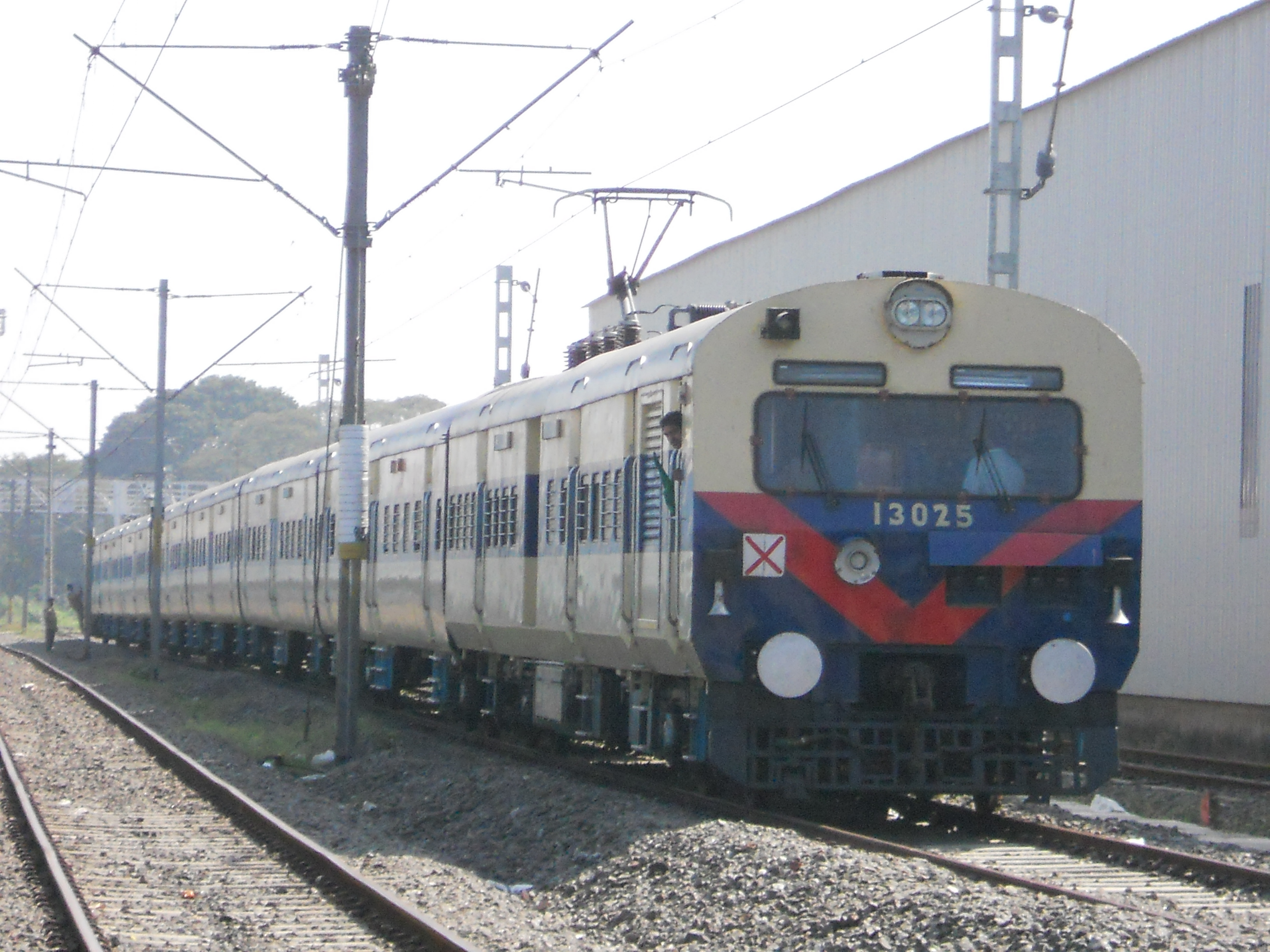
A MEMU train near Kollam MEMU Shed

A MEMU shed for Kollam was proposed in 2008's Indian Railway Budget. Kollam MEMU shed was formally commissioned on 1 December 2013. Currently the MEMU trains runs between Kollam Junction to Greater Cochin region via Kottayam and via Alappuzha. The fastest three phase ICF Memu cars are plying in this section. Kollam MEMU Shed is the second MEMU Shed in Kerala, which is equipped with most modern facilities. There was a plan initially to conduct suburban railway between Trivandrum Central to Chengannur and Haripad at regular intervals. But due to lack of dedicated lines and automated signalling system on the state the project was abandoned

== Freight traffic ==
The freight traffic marked an all-time high record with Rs 466.41 crore earnings in the financial year 2017-2018 and there is a hike of Rs 115.51 crore, when compared to the freight earnings in previous year. Kochi Refineries shared the highest freight traffic followed by FACT Kochi.

== Traffic & passenger earnings details of railway stations ==
| Rank | Station name | District | Area | Category | Total passengers (2022–23) | Total passengers (2023–24) | Total ticket revenue (2023–24) |
|---|---|---|---|---|---|---|---|
| 1 | Thiruvananthapuram Central | Thiruvananthapuram | South Kerala | NSG-2 | 1,09,08,300 | 1,27,55,166 | ₹281,16,65,871 |
| 2 | Ernakulam Junction | Ernakulam | Central Kerala | NSG-2 | 73,18,252 | 87,96,392 | ₹241,70,96,546 |
| 3 | Thrissur | Thrissur | Central Kerala | NSG-2 | 58,71,287 | 69,35,379 | ₹164,78,81,510 |
| 4 | Ernakulam Town | Ernakulam | Central Kerala | NSG-2 | 39,54,910 | 50,13,265 | ₹139,07,98,295 |
| 5 | Kollam Junction | Kollam | South Kerala | NSG-2 | 67,04,147 | 82,75,069 | ₹103,06,96,870 |
| 6 | Kottayam | Kottayam | South Kerala | NSG-3 | 32,63,160 | 40,97,682 | ₹88,89,35,513 |
| 7 | Aluva | Ernakulam | Central Kerala | NSG-3 | 34,64,482 | 41,02,821 | ₹83,19,64,389 |
| 8 | Nagercoil Junction | Kanniyakumari | South Tamil Nadu | NSG-3 | 23,13,910 | 25,66,258 | ₹79,79,04,006 |
| 9 | Chengannur | Alappuzha | South Kerala | NSG-3 | 21,52,716 | 26,87,559 | ₹64,78,55,315 |
| 10 | Kochuveli | Thiruvananthapuram | South Kerala | NSG-3 | 9,46,722 | 12,26,470 | ₹56,81,83,342 |

== See also ==
- Southern Railway Zone
- Palakkad railway division
- Thiruvananthapuram Central railway station
