= Guruvayur railway station =

Railway station in Kerala, India

Guruvayur
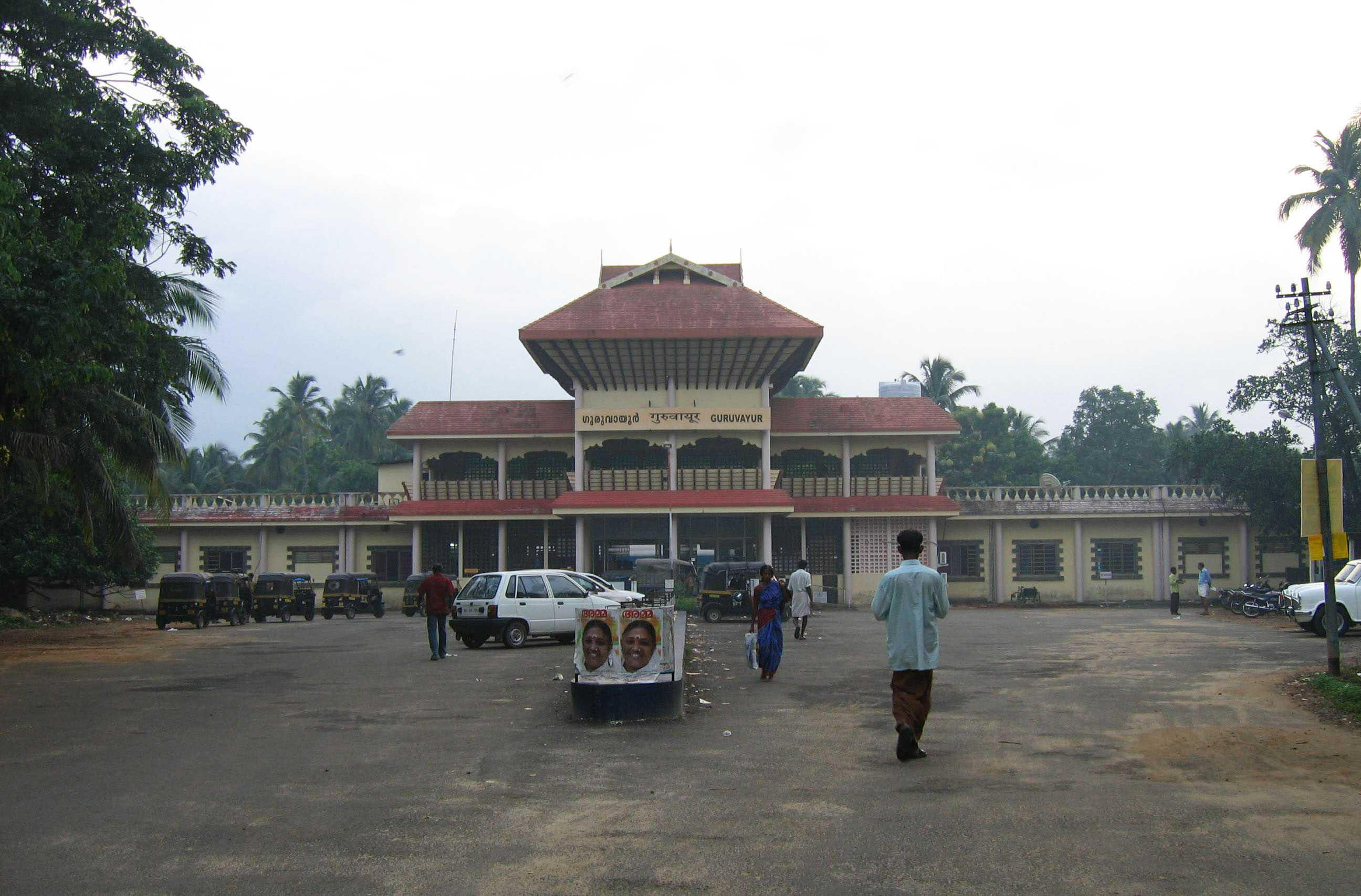
- Entrance of the Station

General information
- Location: Guruvayur, Thrissur District; India
- Coordinates: 10.597°N 76.046°E
- System: Express train & Passenger train station
- Owner: Indian Railways
- Operator: Southern Railway zone
- Line: Guruvayur–Thrissur spur line
- Platforms: 3
- Tracks: 4
- Connections: Taxi Stand, Auto Stand

Construction
- Structure type: Modern
- Platform levels: 4
- Parking: Available
- Cycle facilities: Available
- Accessible: Yes

Other information
- Station code: GUV
- Fare zone: Indian Railways
- Classification: NSG-4

History
- Opened: 9 January 1994; 32 years ago
- Electrified: 25 kV AC 50 Hz
Route map
Location
- Location within India Location within Kerala

Guruvayur railway station (station code: GUV) is an NSG–4 category Indian railway station in Thiruvananthapuram railway division of Southern Railway zone. is a railway terminus situated in Guruvayur, Thrissur District, Kerala.

== Overview ==
The station serves as a terminal for the Guruvayur–Thrissur spur line. It also gains religious importance for its proximity to the Guruvayur Temple.

== Layout ==
It has four tracks and three platforms for both passenger and shunting purpose.
