= Shoranur–Cochin Harbour section =

High density railway corridor in Kerala

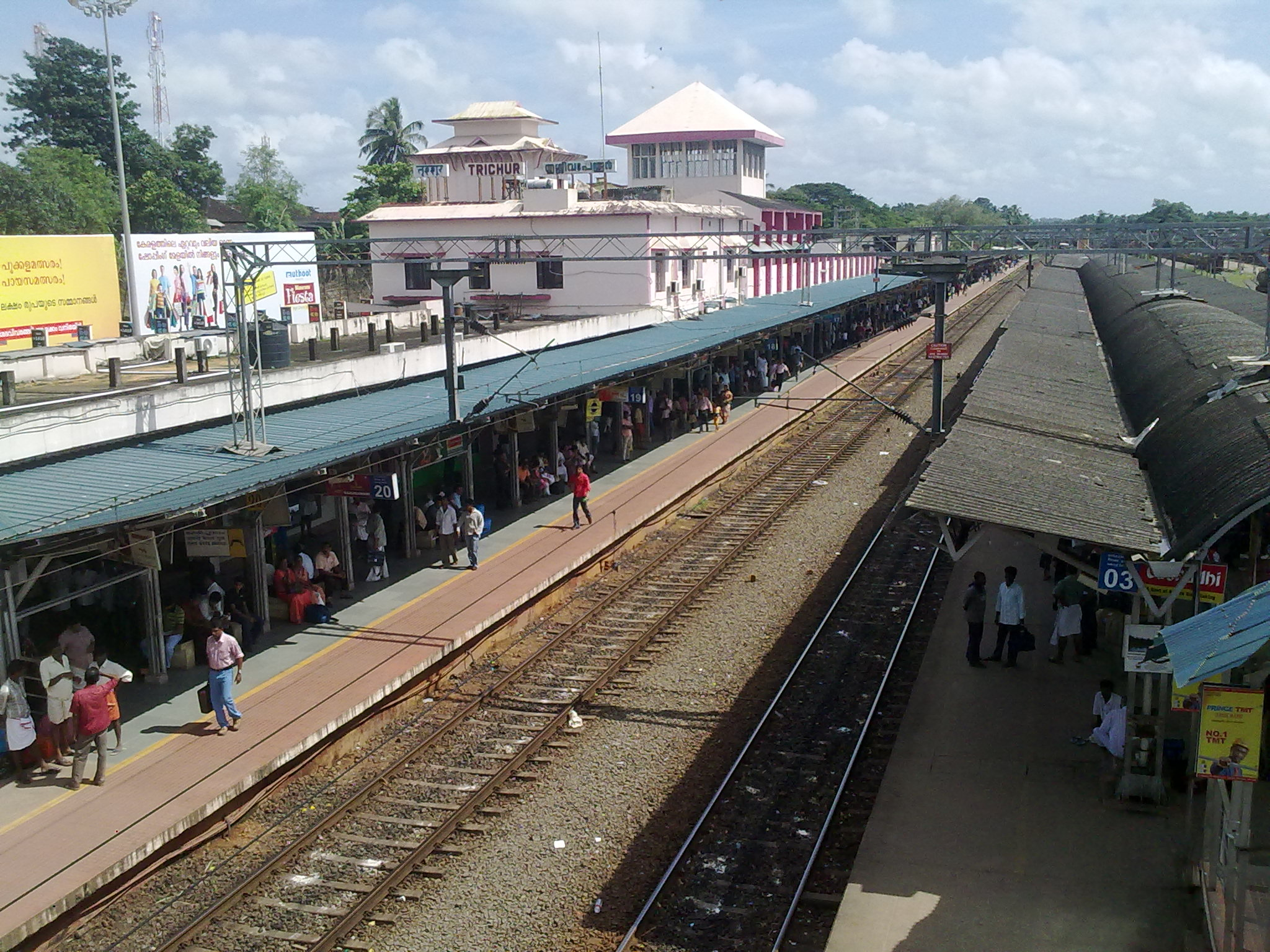
- A view of Thrissur Railway Station in Thrissur City from the railway over bridge.

Overview
- Status: Operational
- Owner: Southern Railway Zone
- Locale: Kerala
- Termini: Shoranur Junction (SRR); Cochin Harbour Terminus (CHTS)
- Stations: 22

Service
- Type: Regional rail
- System: Electrified
- Services: 2
- Operator(s): Palakkad; Thiruvananthapuram
- Depot(s): Ernakulam
- Rolling stock: WAP-1, WAP-4, WAP-7 electric locos; WDS-6, WDM-2, WDM-3A, WDP-4 and WDG-3A, WDG-4

History
- Opened: 16 July 1902; 123 years ago

Technical
- Line length: 107 kilometres (66 mi)
- Number of tracks: 2
- Character: Suburban and long distance
- Track gauge: 1,676 mm (5 ft 6 in)
- Electrification: Fully
- Operating speed: 80 kilometres per hour (50 mph)

Shoranur–Cochin Harbour section is a high density railway corridor in Kerala state, India, running from Shoranur Junction in Palakkad district through Thrissur district to Kochi in Ernakulam district. The Shoranur–Cochin Harbour section is strategic and the lifeline of Kerala economy that connects the state to other parts of India. It is central to the provision of fast, long-distance Intercity and Express passenger services between Kerala and other cities of India. It is operated by Thiruvananthapuram railway division of the Southern Railway zone.

== History ==
Rama Varma, known as Rajarshi, the Maharaja of Cochin (1895–1914) was instrumental in establishing the Shoranur Junction–Cochin Harbour Terminus railway line. Records at the archives reveal that the Maharaja had a prolonged, detailed correspondence with the Resident of the British Empire since 1862 on the ways and means to establish the railway line.

Finally, the State was asked to bear the entire expenditure involved in laying the lines. The Kingdom of Cochin then was not rich enough to bear the substantial investment. But the Maharaja made the decision to sell a part of the valuables in his custody. The treasury records of Kingdom of Cochin substantiate the fact that the Maharajah sold 14 gold elephant caparisons that belonged to the Sree Poornathrayesa temple and other personal ornaments which belonged to the Cochin royal family to fund the project.

Once the fund was sanctioned the project ran into another hurdle. About 18 miles (29 km) of the railway line, between Angamaly and Edappally, passed through the erstwhile Travancore state. In October 1899, the Travancore state was requested to hand over the land required for the laying of the railway line. Construction began in 1899 and was undertaken by the Madras Railway company, on behalf of the Cochin state. There was a delay in the commissioning as bridges had to be built across a few rivers on the route. The route was opened for goods traffic on the 2 June and for passenger traffic on 16 July 1902. Thus train traffic began on this line. The metre gauge line was later converted to 5 ft 6 in (1,676 mm) broad gauge on 24 October 1935. It was during the Diwanship of P. Rajagopalachari (1896–1901), the railway line was completed and under the Diwanship of C.G. Herbert (1930–1935) the line was converted from Metre Gauge to Broad Gauge.

The Shoranur Junction–Kochi metre gauge railway line, that was about 62 miles (100 km) long, ended at the Ernakulam Terminus Station (Ernakulam Old Railway Station; Station Code: ERG), situated behind Kerala High Court. Initially, there was only one track. A circular track was put up nearby to enable the engine to turn. Buses and rickshaws used to come up to the station to pick up the passengers. There was an exclusive saloon for the Maharaja that used to be attached to the train only when the Maharaja travelled. Admission to the royal waiting room was restricted to members of the royal family and VIPs.

The contract having expired on 31 December 1907, The Madras Guaranteed Railway Co. was purchased by the Secretary of State for India. The northern lines were made over to Southern Maratha Railway Co. for working, the enlarged company being styled thereafter as the Madras and Southern Mahratta Railway Co. The southern lines from Jolarpet to Mangalore, including branch lines were similarly made over to the South Indian Railway Co. along with running powers over the Madras-Bangalore section. Shoranur–Cochin Railway Line was open to traffic on 16 July 1902. The line was the property of the Cochin Government and was worked by the South Indian Railway Company. The line was converted into broad gauge between 1930 and 1935 as part of development of Cochin Port.

== Post-colonial ==
After Independence, the route was allocated to Palakkad Railway Division which was formed on 31 August 1956. Later on 2 October 1979, it was transferred to Thiruvananthapuram railway division under Southern Railway. In 1986, the doubling of Shoranur–Ernakulam was completed. The electrification of this line was completed in 1996. A new broad gauge line for a distance of 23 kilometre connecting Thrissur to Guruvayur was opened in 1994. This line will be further extended to Tanur (via) Kuttipuram to connect the West Coast line and will serve as a parallel line to the existing Shoranur–Thrissur line.

== Economic importance ==
An average, about 110 trains (60 passenger and 35 goods train) passes through this high density corridor every day. Till 1943, all the goods to Kerala state were transported through back waters. After the arrival of Shoranur – Cochin Harbour section, backwaters lost the glory and majority of the goods were carried by the trains. Tiles, timber and wooden packing boxes were the main goods which were transported to other parts of India through Shoranur – Cochin Harbour section, from Ollur railway station. Later these goods were changed to petroleum goods from Kochi Refineries Limited, LPG from Kochi LNG Terminal, diesel, cement bags, iron ore, coal, copper, steel rods, salt, sugar, rice, wheat, containers to and from International Container Transshipment Terminal, Kochi etc.
