= Kollam MEMU Shed =

ISO certified motive power depot facility for maintaining MEMU rakes

Kollam MEMU Car Shed
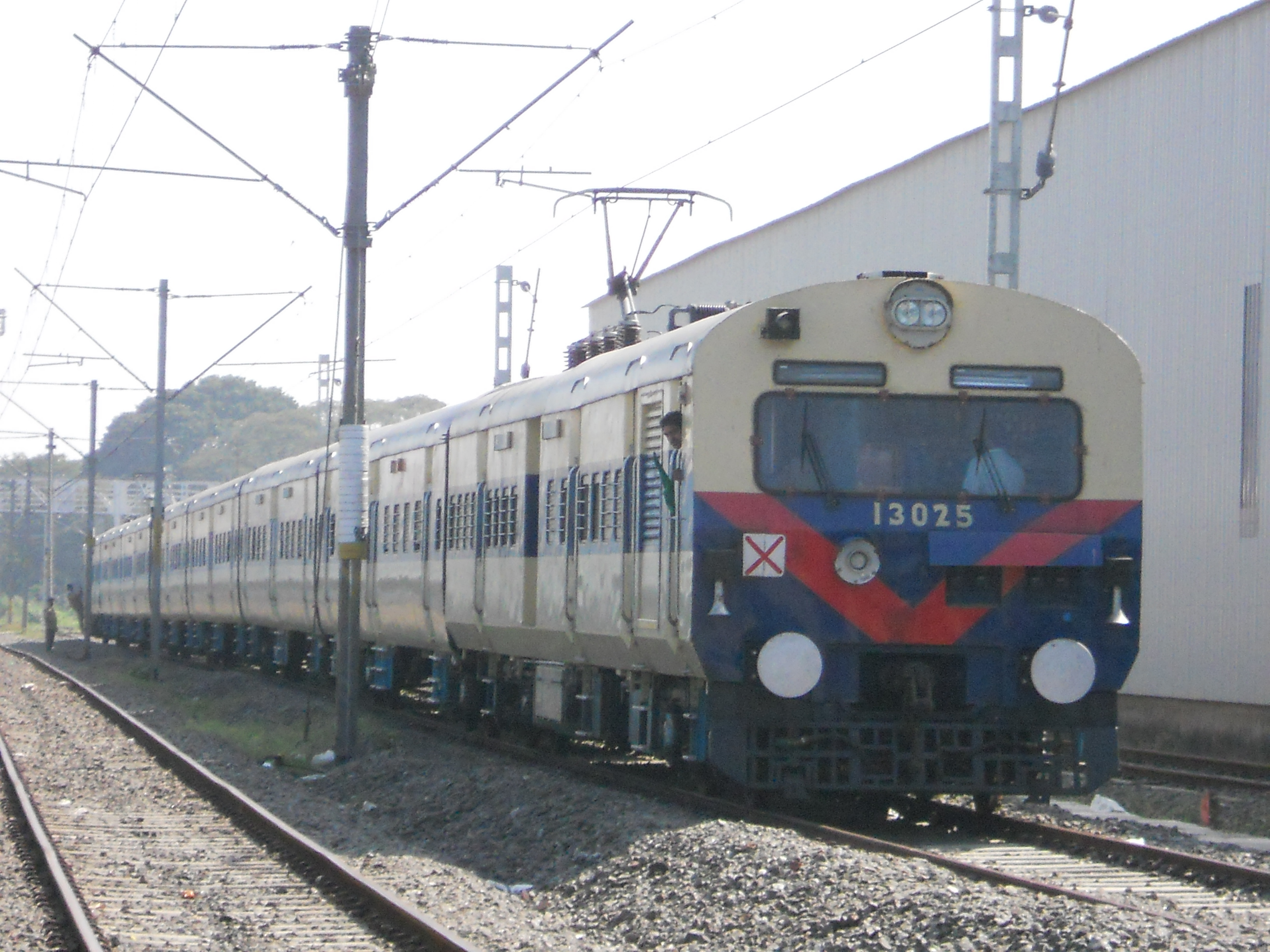
- A MEMU train near Kollam MEMU shed
- Interactive map of Kollam MEMU Car Shed

Location
- Location: Kollam Junction railway station, India
- Coordinates: 8.886068°N 76.597297°E

Characteristics
- Owner: Indian Railways
- Operator: Southern Railway zone
- Depot code: QLN
- Type: Electric multiple unit
- Rolling stock: MEMU
- Routes served: QLN–KTYM–ERS155.6 km QLN–CAPE151.1 km QLN–ALLP–ERS141.4 km KYJ––ERS114.8 km QLN–PUU44 km

History
- Opened: 1 December 2013 (12 years ago)

Kollam MEMU Car Shed is an ISO certified motive power depot facility for maintaining MEMU rakes, situated in the city of Kollam in the Indian state of Kerala. It is one of the four MEMU rake maintenance sheds serving the Southern Railway zone of the Indian Railways. Kollam MEMU Shed is functioning as the control and coordination center of MEMU trains running through Kerala state.

== History ==
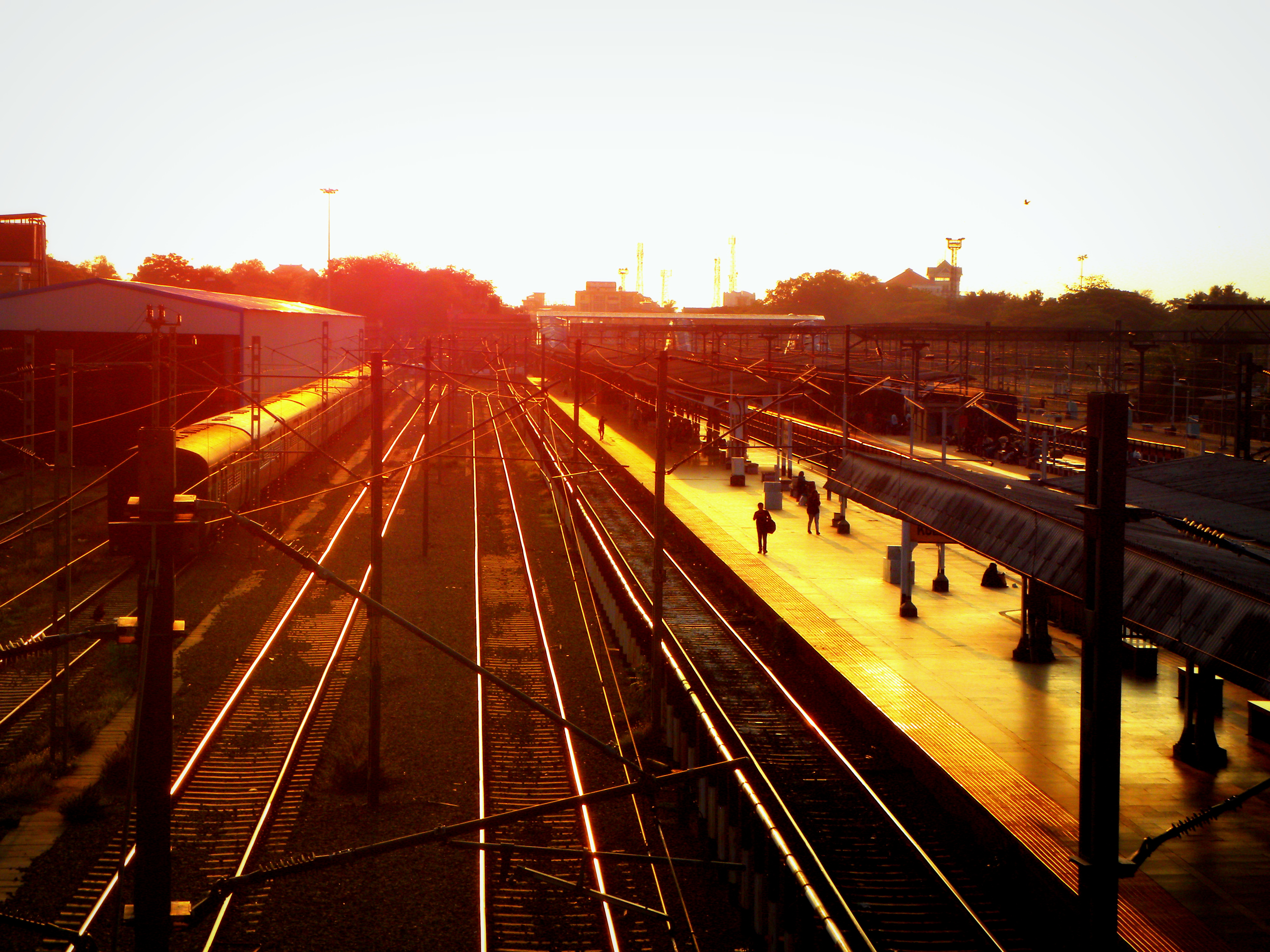
An evening view of Kollam MEMU Shed and railway station

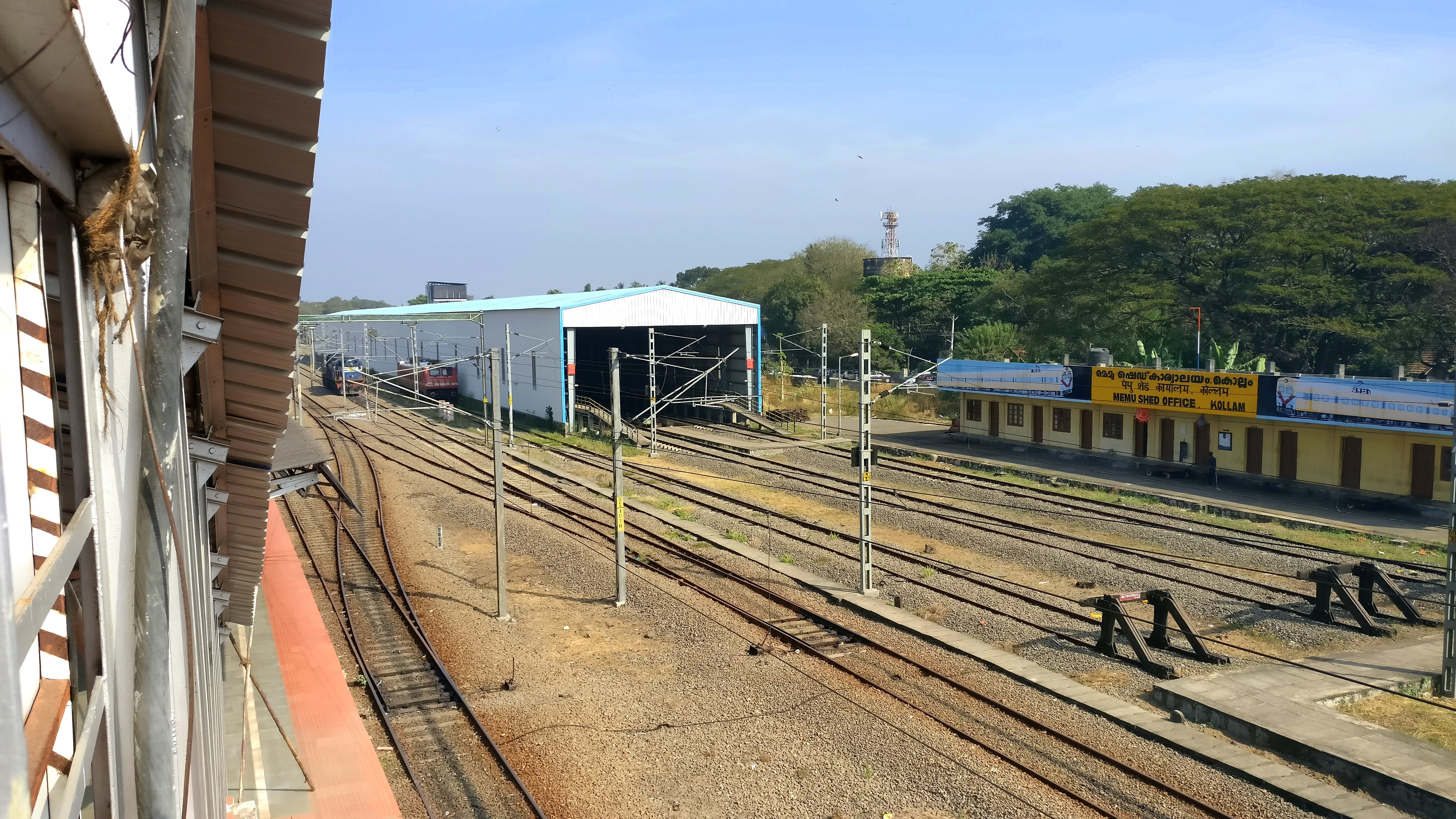
MEMU Car Shed and Office in Kollam Junction railway station premises

MEMU Car sheds in Kollam and Palakkad were proposed in 2008's Indian Railway Budget. The first announced MEMU shed for Kerala was in Kollam, but the inauguration of this shed was delayed for more than two years due to clearance issues and negligence of Indian Railways. Palakkad MEMU Shed inaugurated on 1 January 2011. The Kollam MEMU Shed was formally commissioned on 1 December 2013, five years after its completion. In the second half of 2019, the Southern Railway started replacing the traditional rakes with High-speed, three-phase MEMU trains running on Kollam routes. As the first step, a three-phase MEMU train with 8 coaches started service on Kollam Junction-Ernakulam Junction-Kollam Junction route from 2 September 2019.

== Operations ==
The MEMU Car Shed in Kollam currently conducts periodic overhauling activities for two different types of rakes manufactured by ICF, Chennai:

- Generation I rakes
- 3-phase 8 coach rake (Total capacity: 2,402 passengers)

Presently, 9 pairs of MEMU services are operated from/to Kollam Junction. The maintenance works of those rakes are regularly being done in Kollam MEMU shed.

Train Number	Train Name	Schedule
66301/66302	Punalur - Kollam MEMU	Daily
66303/66304	Kollam - Ernakulam Junction MEMU (Via Alappuzha)	All days except Mondays
66305/66306	Kanyakumari - Kollam MEMU (Via Trivandrum)	All days except Fridays
66307/66308	Ernakulam Junction - Kollam MEMU (via Kottayam)	All days except Wednesdays
66309/66310	Kollam - Ernakulam Junction MEMU (Via Alappuzha)	All days except Tuesdays
66311/66312	Alappuzha - Kollam MEMU	Daily
66315/66316	Kottayam - Kollam MEMU	Daily
66317/66318	Punalur - Kollam MEMU	Daily
66321/66322	Ernakulam Junction - Kollam MEMU (via Kottayam)	Daily
16309/16310	Ernakulam Junction - Kayamkulam MEMU Express (via Kottayam)	Daily

== See also ==
- Kollam
- Kollam Junction railway station
- Kollam district
- Ernakulam-Kottayam-Kayamkulam line
