= Munroturuttu railway station =

Railway station in Kerala, India

Munroe Island Mundrothuruthu
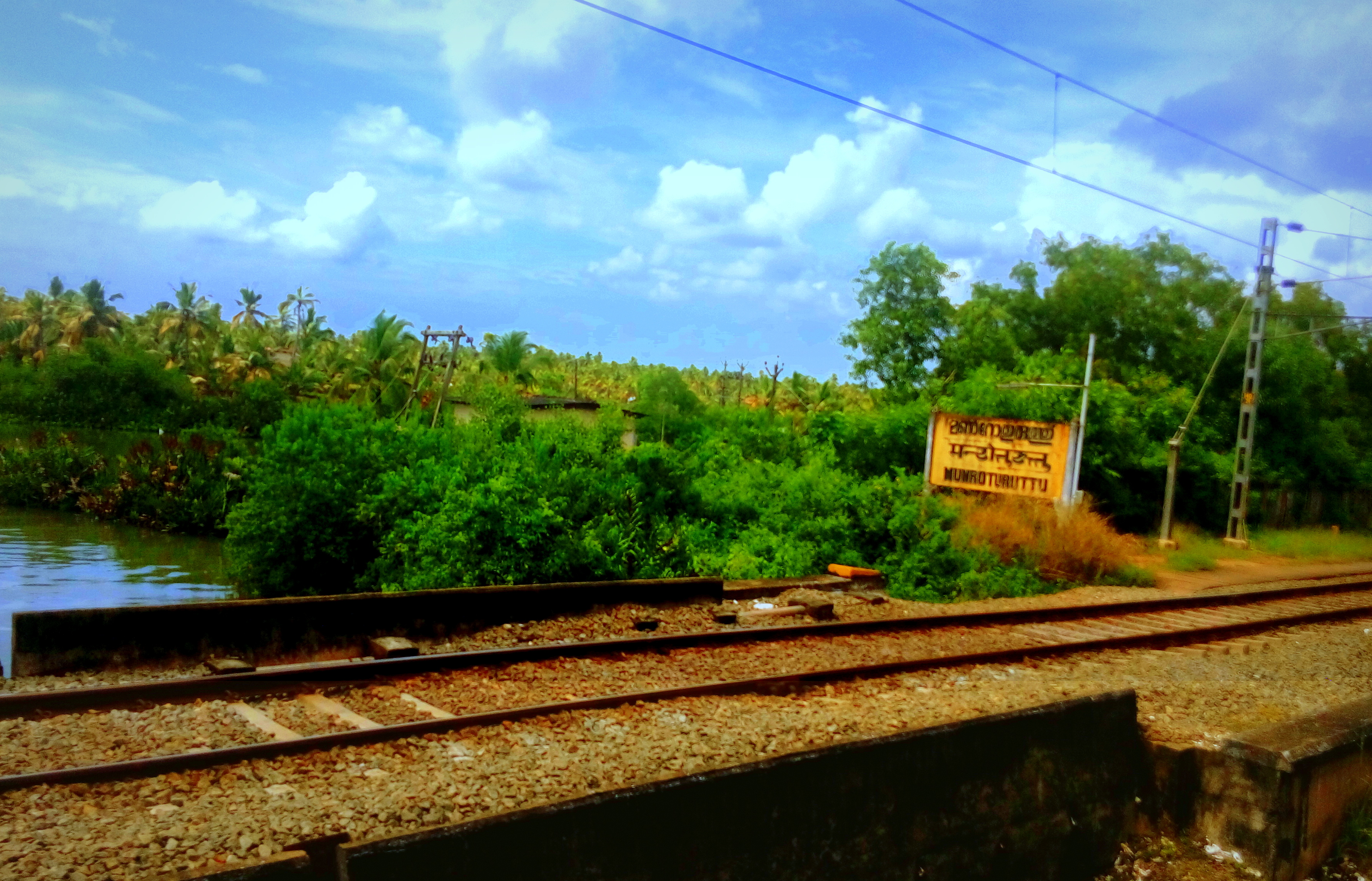
- Name board of Munroturuttu railway station

General information
- Location: Chittumala road, Munrothuruthu, Kollam, Kerala; India
- Coordinates: 8.994541°N 76.611542°E
- Elevation: 1 m (3 ft 3 in)
- System: Regional rail, Light rail & Commuter rail station
- Owner: Indian Railways
- Operator: Southern Railway zone
- Line: Ernakulam–Kottayam–Kollam line
- Platforms: 2
- Tracks: 2

Construction
- Structure type: At–grade
- Parking: Yes

Other information
- Status: Functioning
- Station code: MQO
- Zone(s): Southern Railway zone
- Division(s): Thiruvananthapuram
- Fare zone: Indian Railways

History
- Opened: 1958; 68 years ago
- Closed: 2024 January 31
- Rebuilt: 2024 September 25
- Electrified: 25 kV AC 50 Hz
- Former names: Munroe Islands

Passengers
- 250: 100
Route map
Location
- Location within India Location within Kerala

Munroturuttu railway station or Mundrothuruthu railway station (Code:MQO) is an 'HG 2 Category' halt railway station, situated between Perinad and Sasthamkotta railway stations of Kollam district in Kerala state, India. The station is coming under the Southern Railway zone of Indian Railways. The nearest major rail head of Munrothuruthu railway station is Kollam Junction railway station.

== Location ==
Munroe Island (also called as Mundrothuruthu) is an island located at the union of Ashtamudi Lake and the Kallada River. It was one of the old settlements of Dutch who had arrived at Kerala. This place is named as an honor to Colonel John Munro, who was the divan or the prime minister of the former Princely State of Travancore. Mundrothuruthu is a tourism spot situated at the outskirts of Kollam city, about 25 km away from the city proper. This backwater marvel is attracting a huge number of tourists every day. The Kayal(Lake) Pradakshina Cruise operated by local boat owner are available here in Mundrothuruthu. Narrow waterways, canals, lagoons, and the islands of Pathupara are the other attractions of the Munroe Island. There are a number of coconut farms on either side of the waterways.

== Services ==
Mundrothuruthu is well connected with various cities in India like Kollam, Trivandrum, Kochi, Thrissur, Kottayam, Alappuzha through Indian Railways.

Trains having halt at the station.

No.	Train no	Origin	Destination	Train name
1.	16341/16342	Thiruvananthapuram Central	Guruvayur	Intercity Express
2.	56300/56301	Kollam Junction	Alappuzha	Passenger
3.	56391/56392	Kollam Junction	Ernakulam	Passenger
4.	56305	Kottayam	Kollam Junction	Passenger
5.	56304	Nagercoil Junction	Kottayam	Passenger
6.	66300/66301	Kollam Junction	Ernakulam	MEMU
7.	66307/66308	Ernakulam	Kollam Junction	MEMU
8.	56393/56394	Kottayam	Kollam Junction	Passenger
9.	66302/66303	Kollam Junction	Ernakulam	MEMU
10.	56365/56366	Guruvayur	Punalur	Fast Passenger

== See also ==
- Munroe Island
- Kollam Junction railway station
- Karunagappalli railway station
- Paravur railway station
- Perinad railway station
- Sasthamkotta railway station
