= Avaneeswaram =

- village
- Location in Kerala, India Avaneeswaram (India)
- Coordinates: 9°2′40″N 76°49′46″E
- Country: India
- State: Kerala
- District: Kollam

Languages
  - Official: Malayalam, English
- Time zone: UTC+5:30 (IST)
- PIN: 691508
- Telephone code: +91 475 .......
- Vehicle registration: KL-
- Nearest city: Kollam - 34.7 km
- Lok Sabha constituency: Mavelikkara

Avaneeswaram is a small village located on Kunnicode-Pathanapuram road in Kollam district, Kerala. It is about 7 kilometers south of Pathanapuram town and 36 kilometers from Kollam. It is a part of Vilakkudy panchayat. Avaneeswaram has a FCI (Food corporation of India) storage facility. Economy of this village primarily is agricultural. Most common farm produce includes coconut, tapioca, areca, and cashews. Some rice cultivation is also seen.

== Transport ==
The roads to Thalavoor and Pattazhy pass through Avaneesaram. Avaneeswaram is connected to Kollam city by Kollam-Punalur Broad gauge railway line. Avaneeshwaram railway station (Code: AVS) falls under the Madurai railway division of the Southern Railway Zone. It is a 'D-Class' Adersh Station.

=== Train services from Avaneeswaram ===
Train Number	Source	Destination	Name/Type
56715	Punalur	Kanyakumari	Passenger
56332	Kollam Junction	Punalur	Passenger
56331	Punalur	Kollam Junction	Passenger
56334	Kollam Junction	Edamon	Passenger
56700	Madurai	Punalur	Passenger
56333	Edamon	Kollam Junction	Passenger
56336	Kollam Junction	Edamon	Passenger
56365	Guruvayur	Edamon	Fast Passenger
56335	Edamon	Kollam Junction	Passenger
56701	Punalur	Madurai	Passenger
56366	Edamon	Guruvayur	Fast Passenger
56338	Kollam Junction	Punalur	Passenger
56716	Kanyakumari	Punalur	Passenger
56337	Punalur	Kollam Junction	Passenger

== Worship centers ==
There are many worship centers in Avaneeswaram. Thanniyappankavu Sree Mahadevar Temple, St. Mary's Orthodox Church, India Pentecostal Church of God, Assemblies of God in India, Immanuel Marthoma Syrian church, St.Mary's Malankara Catholic church, Avaneeswaram Juma Ath etc. are some of them

=== St. Mary's Orthodox Church ===
St. Mary's Orthodox Church, is located in Kottarakkara Punalur diocese of the Malankara Orthodox Syrian Church.

==== History ====
The first chapel was built in October 1957. In 1958 February 2 new church came into being exist. Holy Qurbana was conducted only in one day in month. Rev Fr C. Sachariah was the first vicar. Vicar was acted as the first trustee and first secretary was C. J. Thomas, Muttatherill. There are 39 families in church in first time. In 1968 construction of second church started. In 1974 completed the construction started worship. In 2013, construction of third church started and in 2017 completed it. Now it is open for worship.
