= Eravipuram railway station =

Railway station in Kerala, India

Eravipuram
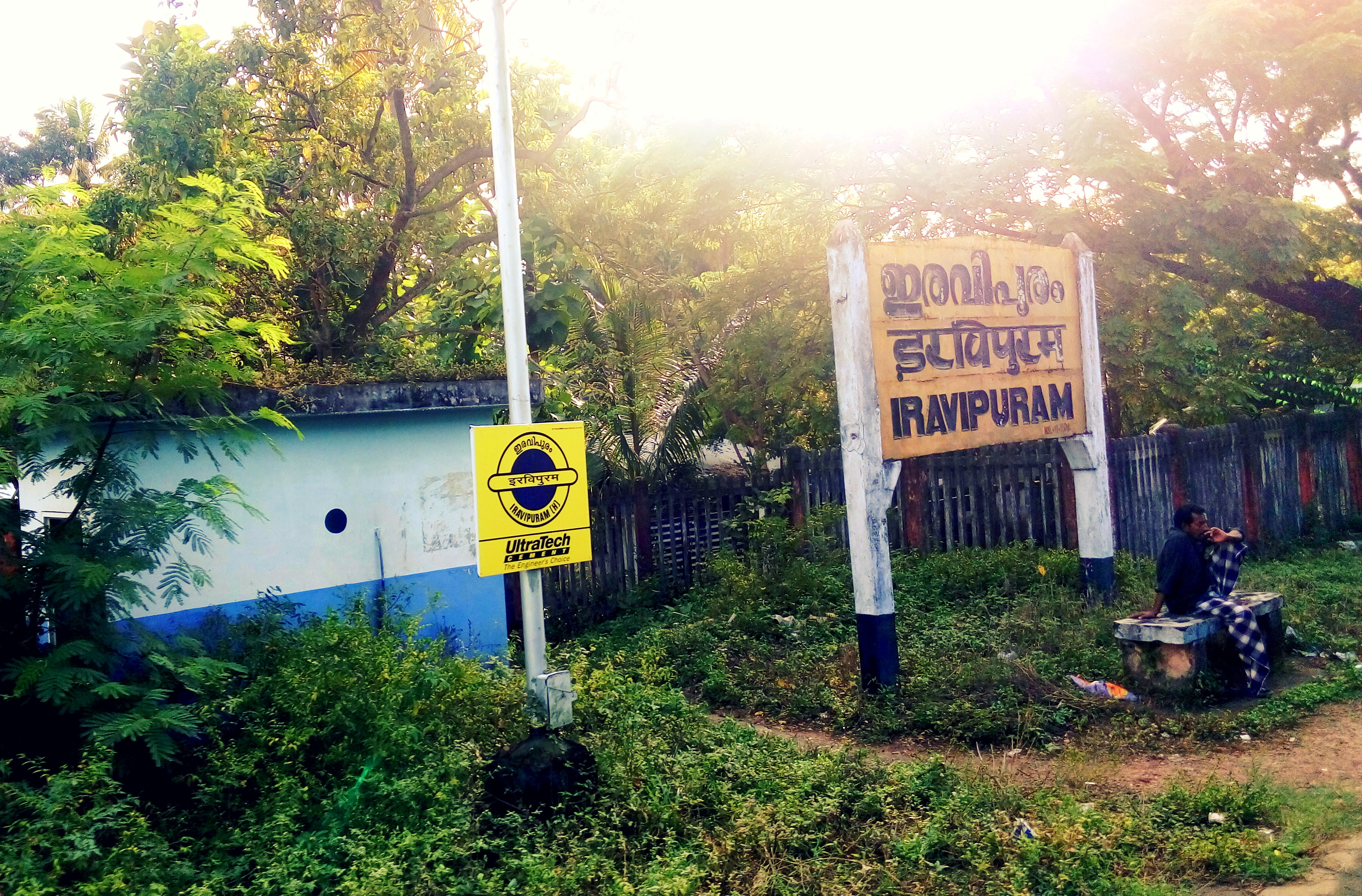

General information
- Location: Eravipuram, Kollam, Kerala; India
- Coordinates: 8.867389°N 76.623444°E
- System: Regional rail, Light rail & Commuter rail station
- Owner: Indian Railways
- Operator: Southern Railway zone
- Line: Kollam Junction–Thiruvananthapuram Central
- Platforms: 2
- Tracks: 2

Construction
- Structure type: At–grade
- Accessible: Disabled access

Other information
- Status: Functioning
- Station code: IRP
- Zone(s): Southern Railway zone
- Division(s): Thiruvananthapuram
- Fare zone: Indian Railways

History
- Opened: 1918; 108 years ago
- Electrified: 25 kV AC 50 Hz
Route map
Location
- Location within India Location within Kerala

Eravipuram railway station or Iravipuram railway station (Code:IRP) is one among the 4 railway stations serving the Indian city of Kollam, Kerala. Eravipuram railway station falls under the Thiruvananthapuram railway division of the Southern Railway zone of Indian Railways. It is a 'F-Class' halt railway station. The annual passenger earnings from Eravipuram railway station during 2011–2012 was Rs. 5,85,813.

Eravipuram is about 5.3 km away from Kollam city. Eravipuram is well connected with various cities like Kollam, Trivandrum, Kottayam, Madurai, Tirunelveli, Nagercoil, Kanyakumari and towns like Paravur, Punalur, Kayamkulam, Karunagappalli, Kottarakkara, Varkala, Chirayinkeezh through Indian Railways.

== Services ==
Train number	Source	Destination	Name/Type
56307	Kollam Junction	Trivandrum Central	Passenger
56700	Madurai	Punalur	Passenger
66304	Kollam Junction	Kanyakumari	MEMU
56309	Kollam Junction	Trivandrum Central	Passenger
56304	Nagercoil	Kottayam	Passenger
56701	Punalur	Madurai	Passenger
56308	Trivandrum Central	Kollam Junction	Passenger
66305	Kanyakumari	Kollam Junction	MEMU

== See also ==
- Eravipuram
- Kollam
- Paravur
- Karunagappalli railway station
- Kollam Junction railway station
- Paravur railway station
