= Sasthamkotta railway station =

Railway station in Kerala, India

Sasthamkotta
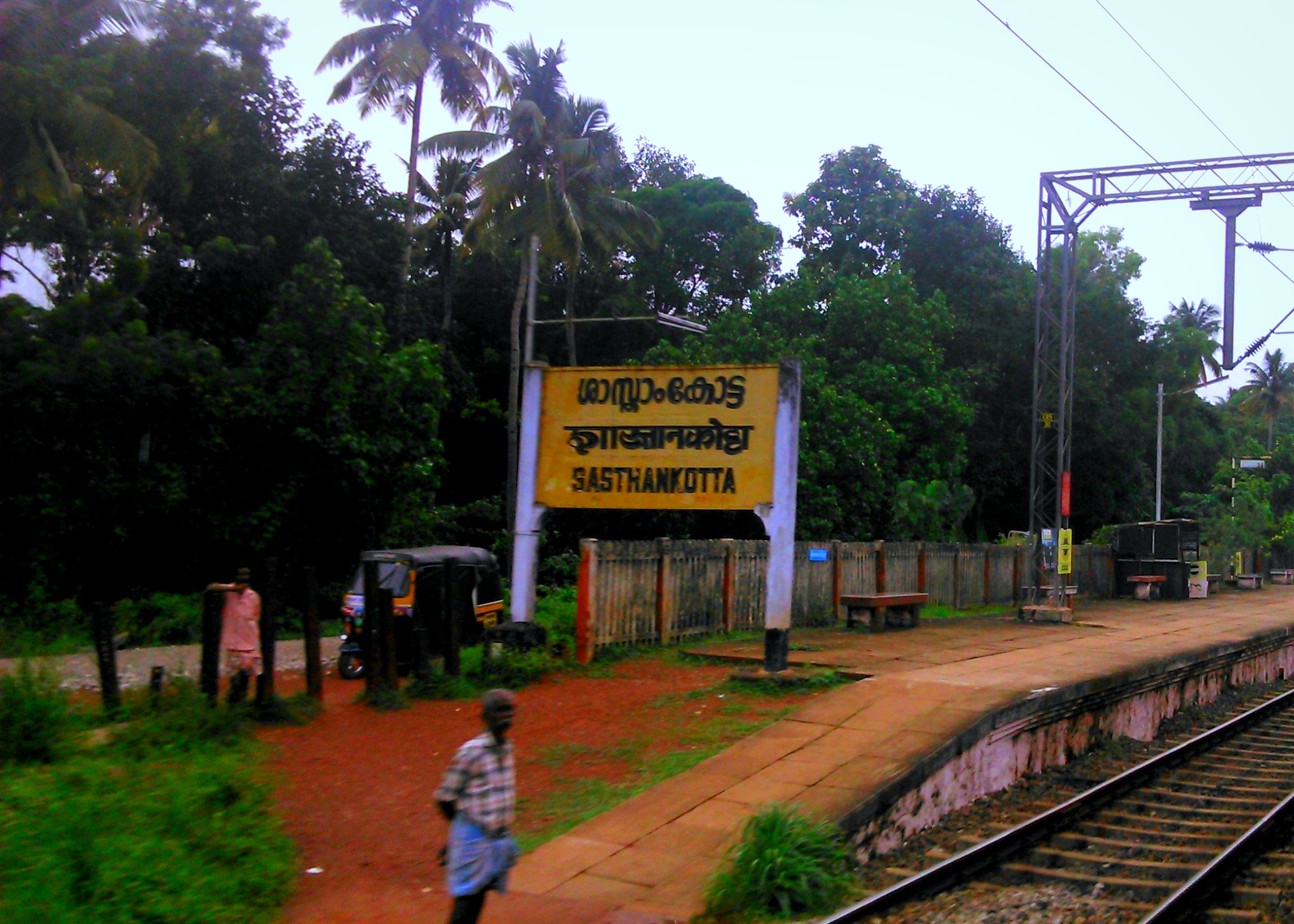

General information
- Location: Sasthamkotta, Kollam, Kerala; India
- Coordinates: 9°01′53.2″N 76°36′03.4″E
- Elevation: 36.34
- System: Regional rail, Light rail & Commuter rail station
- Owner: Indian Railways
- Operator: Southern Railway zone
- Line: Ernakulam–Kottayam-Kollam line
- Platforms: 2
- Tracks: 4

Construction
- Structure type: At–grade
- Parking: Available

Other information
- Status: Functioning
- Station code: STKT
- Zone(s): Southern Railway zone
- Division(s): Thiruvananthapuram
- Fare zone: Indian Railways
- Classification: NSG-5

History
- Opened: 1958; 68 years ago
- Electrified: 25 kV AC 50 Hz

Passengers
- 2,459 per day
Route map
Location
- Location within India Location within Kerala

Sasthamkotta railway station (station code: STKT) is an NSG–5 category Indian railway station in Thiruvananthapuram railway division of Southern Railway zone. It is located in the Kollam district of Kerala. The nearest important major rail head to Sasthamkotta is Kollam Junction railway station. As per the latest railway report, Sasthamkotta railway station has generated ₹1.2479 crore (US$130,000) through annual passenger tickets earning during the year 2016–17.

== Services ==
Express trains having halt at the station.

Train no	Origin	Destination	Train name
16347/16348	Thiruvananthapuram Central	Mangalore Central	Mangalore Express
16629/16630	Thiruvananthapuram Central	Mangalore Central	Malabar Express
16303/16304	Thiruvananthapuram Central	Ernakulam Junction	Vanchinad Express
16649/16650	Nagercoil Junction	Mangalore Central	Parasuram Express
16525/16526	Bangalore City	Kanyakumari	Island Express
18567/18568	Kollam Junction	Visakhapatnam	Kollam–Visakhapatnam Express
16302/16301	Thiruvananthapuram Central	Shoranur Junction	Venad Express
16791/16792	Punalur	Palakkad	Palaruvi Express
06015/06016	Ernakulam Junction	Velankanni	Special Express
16366	Nagercoil Junction	Kottayam	

Passenger trains having halt at the station

Train no	Origin	Destination	Train name
56300/56301	Kollam Junction	Alappuzha	Passenger
56391/56392	Kollam Junction	Ernakulam	Passenger
56305	Kottayam	Kollam Junction	Passenger
56304	Nagercoil Junction	Kottayam	Passenger
66300/66301	Kollam Junction	Ernakulam	MEMU
66307/66308	Ernakulam	Kollam Junction	MEMU
56393/56394	Kottayam	Kollam Junction	Passenger
66302/66303	Kollam Junction	Ernakulam	MEMU
56365/56366	Guruvayur	Punalur	Fast Passenger

== See also ==
- Karunagappalli railway station
- Kollam Junction railway station
- Paravur railway station
- Kayamkulam Junction railway station
