= Kollam Rentha =

- Type: Lace
- Material: Cotton
- Place of origin: Eravipuram, Kollam, Kerala

Kollam Rentha (കൊല്ലം റേന്ത) is a type of bobbin lace created around the Eravipuram area of Kollam. Rentha is derived from the Portuguese word for lace, renda. Five centuries have passed since this craft reached the coastal areas of Eravipuram.

== History ==
From 1515 to 1544, a few Portuguese nobles lived in Eravipuram. It is assumed that the local women learned this art from the Portuguese ladies who were engaged in making rentha as a creative and leisure pursuit. The art form of Rentha, handed down from generation to generation, is confined to a few houses along the coastal streets of Eravipuram.

== Work ==
Rentha making in these areas is done primarily by women, and entirely by hand without the use of machinery. The main manufacturing materials are motu needle and thread. Rentha is made on the outside of a circular pillow made of coir. First, the design drawn on paper is fixed on to the pillow by nailing the knotted needle at the specified positions. The yarn-wrapped bobbins are tied to the knot needles with yarn. The lace is constructed when the bobbins are moved by the dexterity of the hand movements. Veerla is made from pieces of wood three and a half inches long. Frocks, table cloths, window curtains, chair backs, bed sheets, pillow covers, caps, meter laces, etc. are made in this way.

Rentha making was a cottage industry for the people of Eravipuram until 1969 when a group called the Women Cottage Industrial Cooperative Society was started in Eravipuram to nurture and protect the cottage industry. Rentha was exported to Belgium and America. White lace was in good demand abroad. Now the work of this group has stopped.

Meticulousness and neatness are desirable elements of rentha construction. If not done correctly, the intended design will not form on the canvas.
