= Edamann railway station =

Railway station in Kerala, India

Edamann
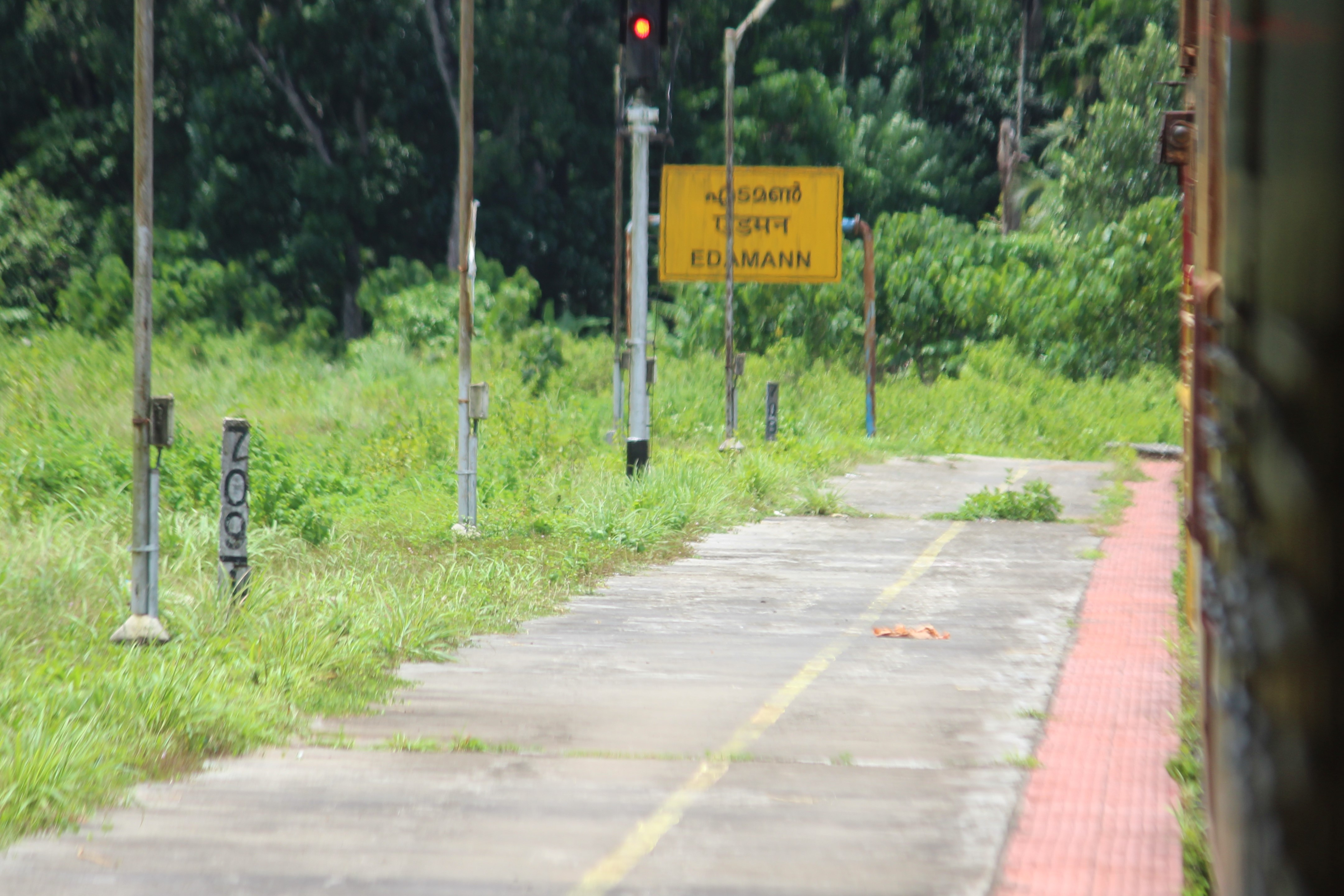

General information
- Location: Edamon, Kollam, Kerala; India
- Coordinates: 9.0071°N 76.9825°E
- System: Regional rail, light rail & commuter rail station
- Owner: Indian Railways
- Operator: Southern Railway zone
- Line: Kollam–Sengottai branch line
- Platforms: 2
- Tracks: 2

Construction
- Structure type: At–grade
- Parking: Available

Other information
- Status: Functioning
- Station code: EDN
- Zone(s): Southern Railway zone
- Division(s): Madurai
- Fare zone: Indian Railways

History
- Opened: 1904; 122 years ago
- Closed: 2007
- Rebuilt: 2017

Passengers
- 2022–23: 7 per day 2,628 per year
Route map
Location
- Location within India Location within Kerala

Edamann railway station (station code:EDN) is an NSG–6 category Indian railway station in Madurai railway division of Southern Railway zone. It serves Edamann, located on Kollam–Sengottai branch line in Kollam district of the Indian state of Kerala.

The station was remaining unused till mid 2017 due to gauge conversion works between Punalur and Edamon, announced by Indian Railways on 2012–13 budget.

== Performance and earnings ==
For the FY 2022–23, the annual earnings of the station was ₹79,675 (US$830) and daily earnings was ₹218 (US$2.30). For the same financial year, the annual passenger count was 2,628 and daily count was 7. While, the footfall per day was recorded as 28.

== See also ==
- List of railway stations in India
