= MQO =

MQO or mqo can refer to:

- Modole language, a language spoken in Indonesia, by ISO 639 code
- Munroturuttu railway station, a train station in Kollam district, Kerala state, India, by station code
