= Perinad railway station =

Railway station in Kerala, India

Perinad
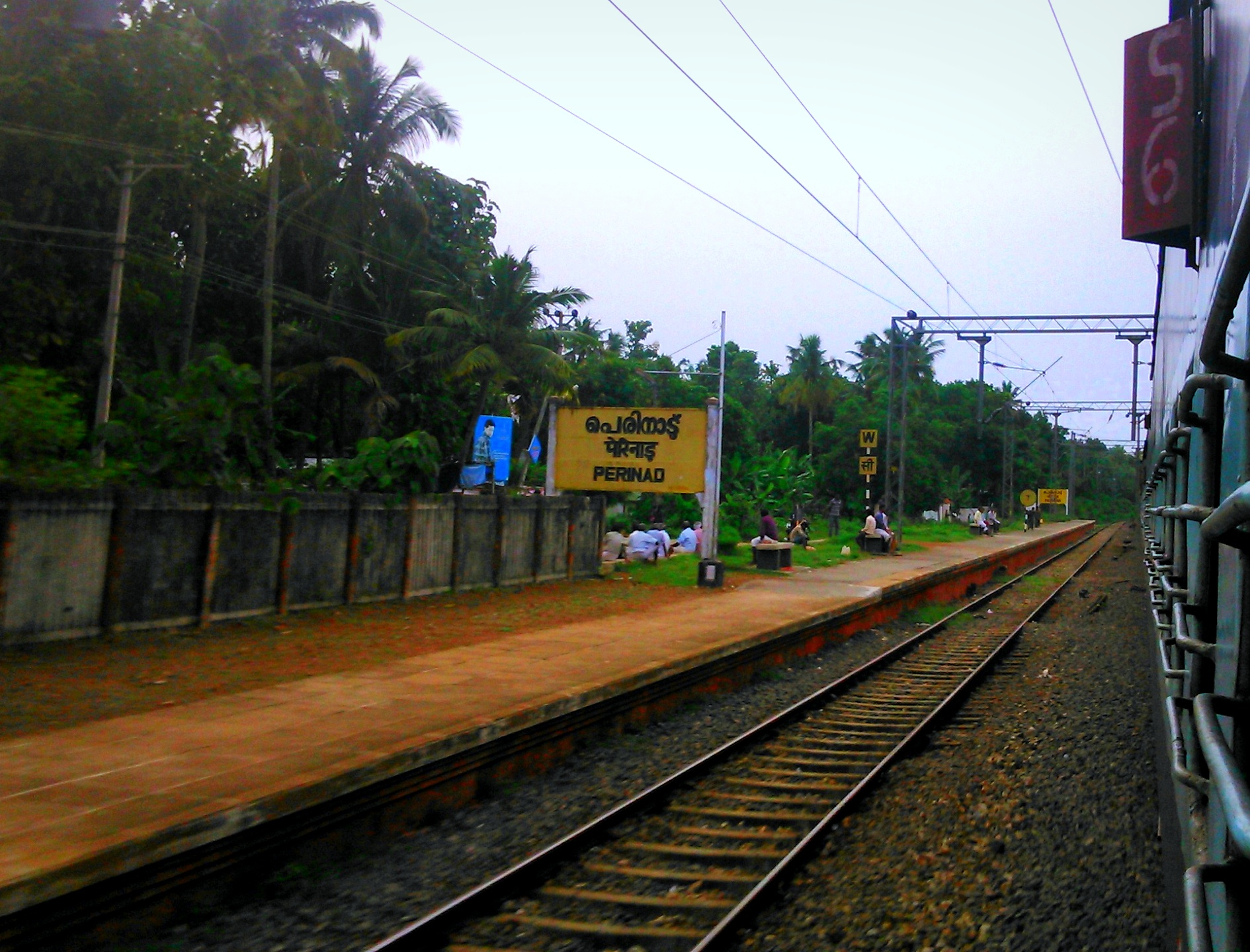

General information
- Location: Perinad, Kollam, Kerala; India
- Coordinates: 8.948564°N 76.620792°E
- System: Regional rail, Light rail & Commuter rail station
- Owner: Indian Railways
- Operator: Southern Railway zone
- Line: Ernakulam–Kottayam–Kollam line
- Platforms: 2
- Tracks: 4

Construction
- Structure type: At–grade

Other information
- Status: Functioning
- Station code: PRND
- Zone(s): Southern Railway zone
- Division(s): Thiruvananthapuram
- Fare zone: Indian Railways

History
- Opened: 1958; 68 years ago
- Electrified: 25 kV AC 50 Hz
Route map
Location

Perinad railway station (station code: PRND) is an NSG–6 category Indian railway station in Thiruvananthapuram railway division of Southern Railway zone. It is situated near the city of Kollam in Kollam district of Kerala. Perinad railway station is situated between Munrothuruthu and Kollam Junction railway station. The nearest important major rail head is Kollam Junction railway station.

Perinad is well connected with various cities in India like Kollam, Trivandrum, Kochi, Thrissur, Kottayam through Indian Railways. It is one of the closest railway stations to Kollam Technopark and Institute of Fashion Technology Kerala (IFT-K).

== See also ==
- Kollam Junction railway station
- Paravur railway station
- Sasthamkotta railway station
- Karunagappalli railway station
