= Kollam–Visakhapatnam Express =

Express train in India

Overview
- Service type: Express
- Locale: Andhra Pradesh, Tamilnadu & Kerala
- First service: January 30, 2014; 12 years ago
- Current operator: South Coast Railway zone

Route
- Termini: Visakhapatnam (VSKP); Kollam Junction (QLN)
- Stops: 33
- Distance travelled: 1,575 km (979 mi)
- Average journey time: 28 hours 35 minutes
- Service frequency: Weekly
- Train number: 18567 / 18568

On-board services
- Classes: AC 2 tier, AC 3 tier, sleeper 3 tier, 6 unreserved
- Seating arrangements: Yes
- Sleeping arrangements: Yes
- Catering facilities: Available
- Observation facilities: Large windows
- Entertainment facilities: -
- Baggage facilities: Under Seat

Technical
- Rolling stock: LHB coach
- Track gauge: 5 ft 6 in (1,676 mm) broad gauge
- Electrification: 100
- Operating speed: 55 km/h (34 mph) average including halts
Route map
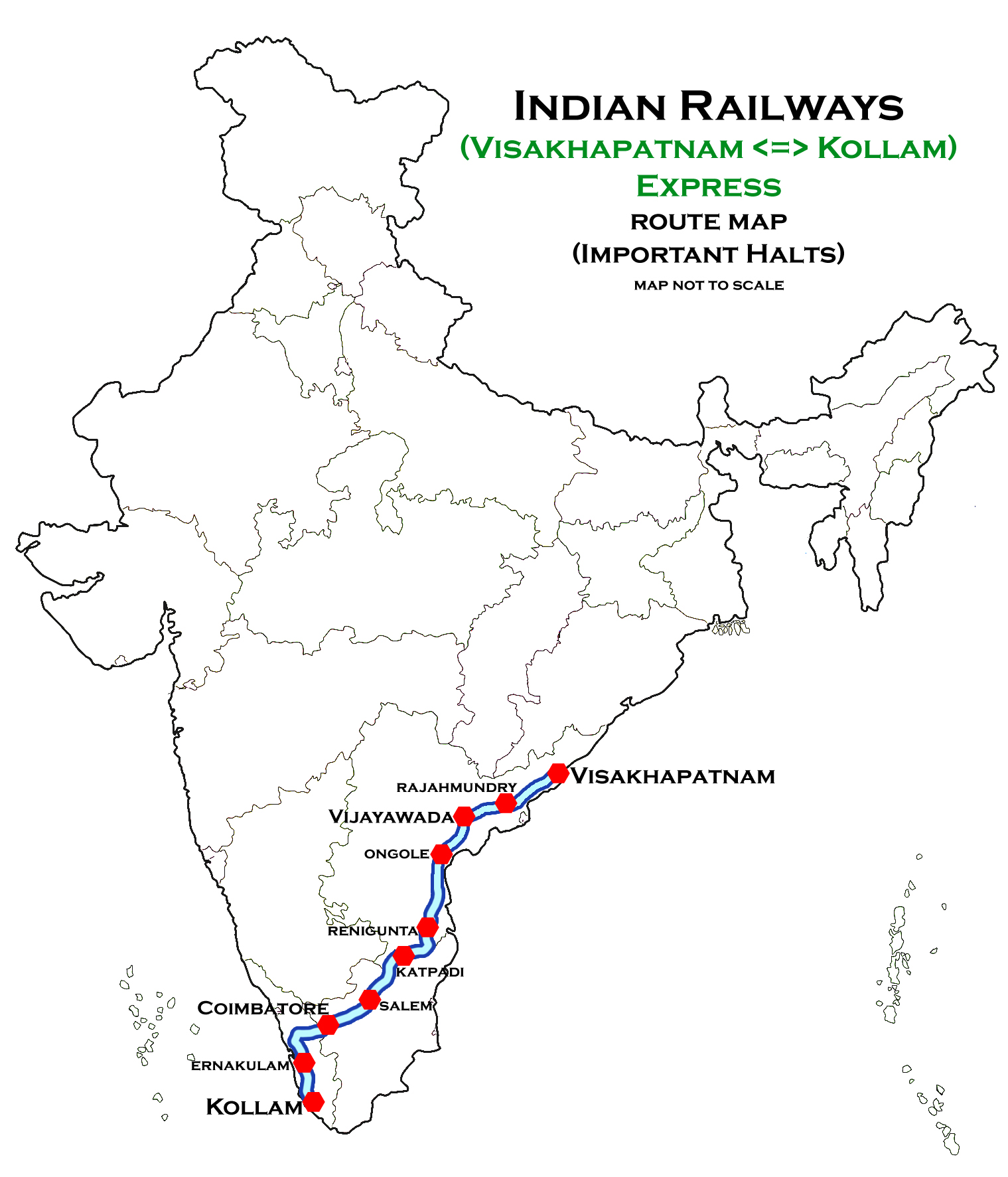

The 18567 / 18568 Kollam–Visakhapatnam Express or Sagar Kanya Express (unofficial) is a weekly express train runs between Kollam Junction in Kerala and Visakhapatnam Junction in Andhra Pradesh.

== History ==
Visakhapatnam is a place where Malayalis are very high in number. A train between Visakhapatnam and Kollam (Quilon or Coulão), the erstwhile commercial capital of Malabar Coast, was a long-standing demand from the Malayali communities in Andhra Pradesh. As a result, Indian Railways have started a permanent service between Kollam and Visakhapatnam on 30 January 2014. Railway used to run special train services between Kollam and Visakhapatnam every year.

== Background ==
The train numbered as 18567 (from Visakhapatnam to Kollam) and 18568 (from Kollam to Visakhapatnam), travels through Vijayawada Junction, Tenali, Katpadi Junction, Coimbatore Junction and Kottayam for both up and down services.

== Route and halts ==
Kollam Junction → Sasthamkotta → Karunagappally → Kayamkulam → Mavelikara → Chengannur → Tiruvalla → Changanassery → Kottayam → Ernakulam Town → Aluva → Thrissur → Palakkad Junction → Coimbatore Junction → Tiruppur → Erode Junction → Salem Junction → Jolarpettai Junction → Katpadi Junction → Renigunta Junction → Gudur Junction → Nellore → Singarayakonda → Ongole → Bapatla → Tenali Junction → Vijayawada Junction → Eluru → Rajahmundry → Samalkot → Elamanchili → Duvvada → Visakhapatnam Junction

== Coach composition ==
- 2 AC II Tier
- 7 AC III Tier
- 1 AC III Tier Economy
- 6 Sleeper Class
- 4 General Coach (Second Class)
- 2 SLR compartments

== See also ==
- Kollam–Thiruvananthapuram trunk line
- Shoranur–Cochin Harbour section
- Anantapuri Express
- Palaruvi Express
- Kollam–Tirupati Express
