= Edamon =

- village
- Location in Kerala, India Edamon (India)
- Coordinates: 9°0′0″N 76°58′0″E
- Country: India
- State: Kerala
- District: Kollam

Area
  - Total: 1 km^{2} (0.39 sq mi)

Population (2011)
  - Total: 12,029
  - Density: 12,000/km^{2} (31,000/sq mi)

Languages
  - Official: Malayalam, English, Tamil
- Time zone: UTC+5:30 (IST)
- PIN: 691307
- Vehicle registration: KL-
- Nearest city: Punalur

Edamon is a village in Punalur taluk in Kollam district in the state of Kerala, India.

== Demographics ==
As of 2001 India census, Edamon had a population of 12453 with 5980 males and 6473 females. The population has reduced to 12,029 with 5,652 males (47%) and 6,377 females (53%) as per the survey of census during 2011 by Indian Government.
