= Auvaneeswaram railway station =

Railway station in Kerala, India

Auvaneeswaram

General information
- Location: Vilakkudy, Avaneeswaram, Kollam, Kerala; India
- Coordinates: 9.036988°N 76.853267°E
- System: Regional rail, Light rail & Commuter rail station
- Owner: Indian Railways
- Operator: Southern Railway zone
- Line: Kollam–Sengottai branch line
- Platforms: 2
- Tracks: 2

Construction
- Structure type: At–grade
- Parking: Available

Other information
- Status: Functioning
- Station code: AVS
- Zone(s): Southern Railway zone
- Division(s): Madurai
- Fare zone: Indian Railways

History
- Opened: 1904; 122 years ago

Passengers
- 2022–23: 454 per day 165,887 per year
Route map
Location
- Location within Kerala Location within India

Auvaneeswaram railway station (station code:AVS) is an NSG–6 category Indian railway station in Madurai railway division of Southern Railway zone. It serves Auvaneeswaram, located in Kollam district of the Indian state of Kerala.

== Performance and earnings ==
For the FY 2022–23, the annual earnings of the station was ₹5,227,271 (US$54,000) and daily earnings was ₹14,321 (US$150). For the same financial year, the annual passenger count was 165,887 and daily count was 454. While, the footfall per day was recorded as 656.

== See also ==
- List of railway stations in India
