= Eravipuram =

Zone & Neighbourhood in Kollam city, Kerala

- Zone & Neighbourhood
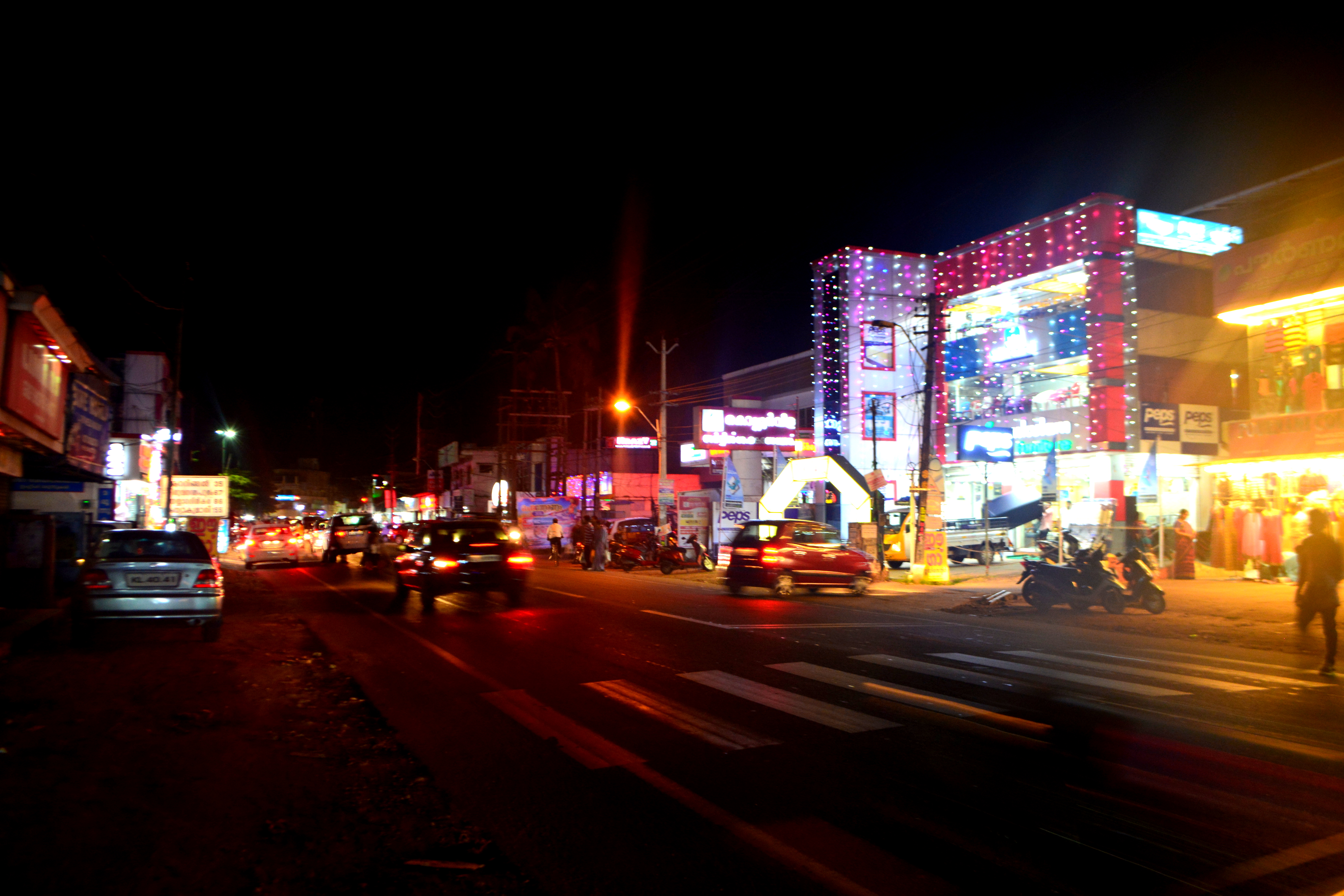
- Pallimukku Junction in Eravipuram

- Location in Kollam, India Eravipuram (Kerala) Eravipuram (India)
- Coordinates: 8°52′0″N 76°37′0″E
- Country: India
- State: Kerala
- District: Kollam

Languages
  - Official: Malayalam, English
- Time zone: UTC+5:30 (IST)
- Nearest city: Kollam City (8 km)

Eravipuram is a neighbourhood of Kollam city in Kerala, India. It is one of the six zones of the Kollam City Corporation. Other zones of the city of Kollam are Central Zone-I, Central Zone-II, Sakthikulangara, Kilikollur, and Vadakkevila.

== Location ==
Eravipuram town is only 8 km away from Kollam city. Other nearby towns are Kottiyam, Mayyanad, Paravur etc. Paravur is 19 km away from Eravipuram. Eravipuram railway station is the nearest railway station, which is one among the three railway stations serving the city of Kollam.

== Geography ==
This place has a long coastal line with Arabian Sea. Portion of TS canal passes through it.

== State government offices ==
- Eravipuram, Sub Registrar Office
- Assistant Director of Agriculture, Eravipuram, Valathungal P.O
- Eravipuram, Krishi Bhavan, Valathungal P.O
- Eravipuram Village office, Valathungal P.O

== Land Marks at Eravipuram ==
Schools in Eravipuram

- Bishop Jerome English Medium Public School
- St John's High School, Eravipuram
- Govt. HSS, Valathungal
- Govt. VHSS, Valathungal
- Govt. Primary School, Valathungal
- Believer's Church Mahathma Central School
- CVMLPS school, Thanni
- Mannam Memorial School, Pinaykkal
- Govt: Higher Secondary School, Eravipuram, Thattamala
- Eravipuram Railway Station, Kavalpura.
- Nirmala Hospital, Kavalpura, Eravipuram.
- Aalummoodu Siva Kshethram.
- St. John's Baptist Church, Eravipuram
- Lord Krishna Temple
- Kerala academy of management studies
- Sree Saravana Temple (Vanchiyil Kovil)
- Kalarivathukkal Mahadevar Temple
- Valathungal Kavu
- Kolloorvila Juma Masjid
- ECHS Polyclinic
- Chthettinada Sree Durga/Bhadra Devi Kshethram.
- Chettinada Ambalakkulam, Eravipuram Jn, Eravipuram.
- Puthennada Sree Durga Devi Kshethram.
- Puthennada Varuvil Kavu Kshethram.
- Snehatheeram Tsunami Residence Association, Vadakkumbhagam
- Civil supply., Thirumukku
- AJ Hall A/C and Non A/C Hall (AJ Fernandez and Joyce Albert memorial Community Hall), Eravipuram Junction.
- Good Shepherd Kinder Garten, Kavalpura.RJ
- Kunnathkkavu Mahavishnu Temple.

== See also ==
- Kollam
- Kollam Municipal Corporation
- Sakthikulangara
- Kilikollur
- Vadakkevila
