= Kollam Junction railway station =

Railway station in Kerala, India

Kollam Junction Quilon Junction
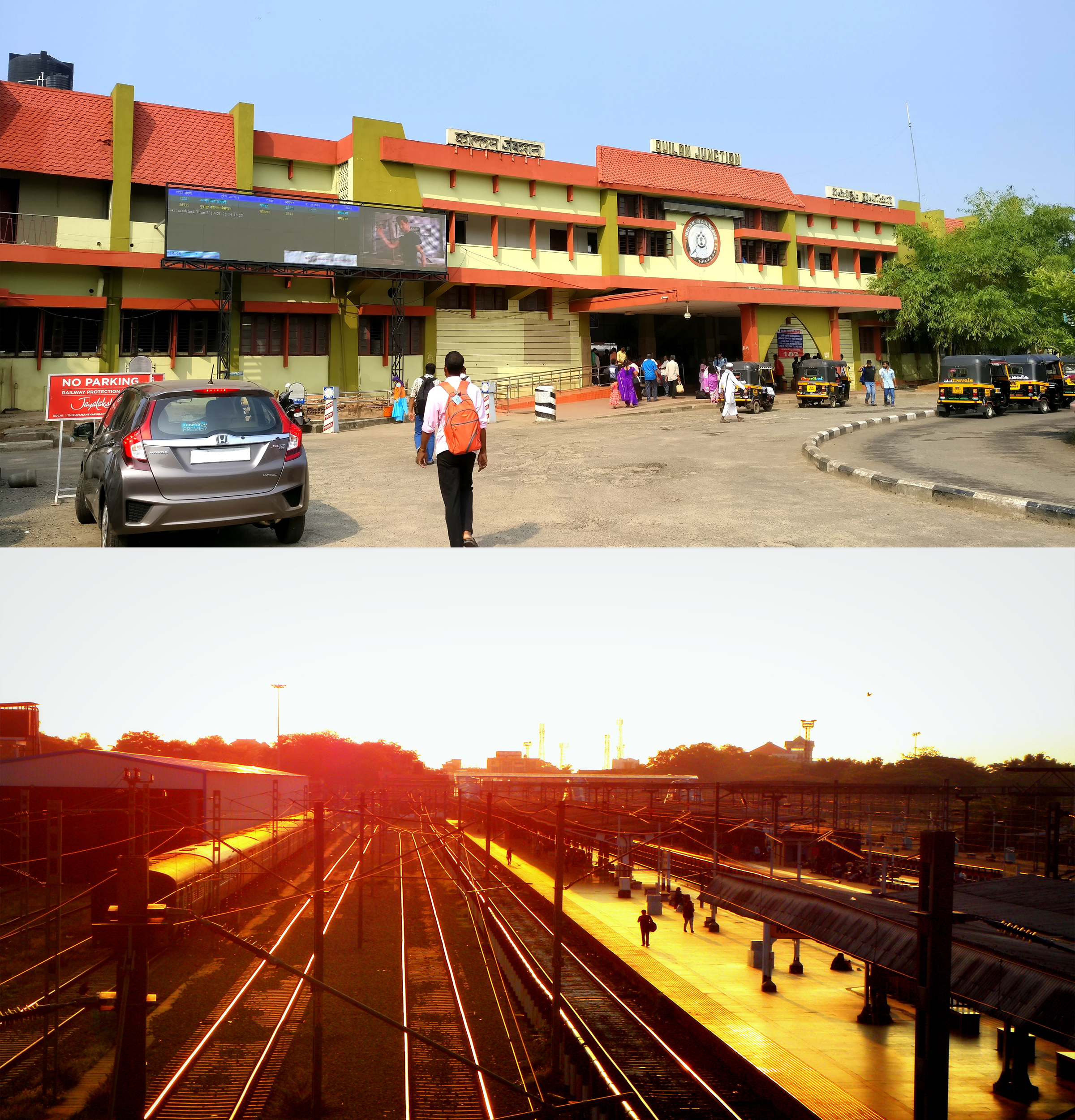
- Southern Terminal and MEMU Carshed building

General information
- Other names: Quilon Junction
- Location: Cantonment, Kollam, Kerala; India
- Coordinates: 8.8860°N 76.5951°E
- Elevation: 6.74 metres (22.1 ft)
- System: Indian Railways station
- Owner: Indian Railways
- Operator: Southern Railway zone
- Lines: Kollam-Thiruvananthapuram; Kollam-Ernakulam; Kollam-Sengottai
- Platforms: 6 (1A,1,2,3,4,5)
- Tracks: 17
- Connections: National Highway 66 (India) National Highway 744 (India)

Construction
- Structure type: At grade
- Platform levels: 01
- Parking: Available
- Cycle facilities: Available
- Accessible: Yes

Other information
- Status: Active
- Station code: QLN
- Zone(s): Southern Railway zone
- Division(s): Thiruvananthapuram
- Classification: NSG-2

History
- Opened: June 1, 1904; 122 years ago
- Electrified: 2001; 25 years ago 25 kV AC 50 Hz
- Former names: Quilon Junction railway station

Key dates
- 1902: 1 Jun 1904: 1 Jan 1918: 6 Jan 1958: 23 Nov 1975: 2001: 10 May 2010: 1 Dec 2013: 2 Mar 2019- 10 Sep 2024: Goods trains service started Station with MG line opened Quilon–Chala service started Became a Junction station BG services to Ernakulam started Line electrification completed Kollam–Punalur BG line opened Kollam MEMU Shed opened Terminal-2 opened Became an NSG-2 station

Passengers
- 2025–26: 55,290 per day 2,01,80,909 per year ▲7.07%
- Rank: 4 (in Kerala); 3 (in Trivandrum division)

Services
Preceding station	Indian Railways	Following station
Perinad towards	Southern Railway zone	Eravipuram towards
Kilikollur towards	Southern Railway zone	Eravipuram towards
Route map
Location
- Location within Kollam Location within Kerala Location within India
- Interactive map

Kollam Junction railway station (station code: QLN) is an NSG–2 category Indian railway station in Thiruvananthapuram railway division of Southern Railway zone. It is a junction station situated in the city of Kollam in Kerala, India. It is the second largest railway station in Kerala in terms of area and largest in terms of number of tracks and one of the oldest railway stations in the state. It is also the second busiest railway station in Kerala in terms of trains handled per day. The world's third longest railway platform is situated at Kollam railway station.

Kollam Junction lies on Kollam–Thiruvananthapuram trunk line. It is operated by the Southern Railway zone of the Indian Railways and comes under the Thiruvananthapuram railway division. The annual passenger ticket revenue of Kollam railway station is ₹103.07 crore (US$11 million) and 23,048 is the daily ridership through this station. It is one among the few railway stations in Kerala having two terminals with ticket counter facility. Four express trains have been originating from Kollam Junction railway station to South Indian cities of Chennai, Visakhapatnam and Tirupati: Visakhapatnam–Kollam Express (weekly), Anantapuri Express (daily), Chennai Egmore–Kollam Junction Express (daily), and Kollam–Tirupati Express (weekly).

== History ==
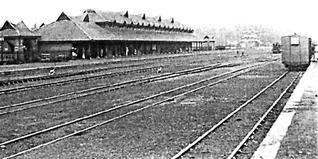
Kollam railway station in 1905

Kollam was the fifth city in Kerala to be connected to the nascent Indian Railways. The idea of a rail link from Chennai to Kollam, then the trading capital of the Travancore Kingdom was first conceived in 1873. The line was sanctioned by the Madras Presidency in 1899 and a survey completed in 1900. The railway line was built jointly by South Indian railway, Travancore state and the Madras Presidency. Kollam's (Anglicized Quilon) railway station was built in 1904 by Sree Moolam Tirunal Rama Varma, Maharaja of Travancore. It was the ruler's desire to create a rail link between Quilon, the then commercial capital of his State and Madras. The metre-gauge line from Quilon to Punalur was inaugurated on 1 June 1904. The Quilon-Sengottai railway line was inaugurated on 26 November 1904. The meter gauge line was later extended to Chala at Trivandrum via Paravur and Varkala and inaugurated on 4 January 1918 Fund allotted for the extension of meter gauge railway line from Quilon to Ernakulam via Kottayam on 1952 and is inaugurated on 6 January 1958. The metre-gauge lines between Kollam and Ernakulam were converted to broad gauge in 1975 and inaugurated on 13 September 1976. The broad gauge conversion between the Punalur and Quilon sections was inaugurated on 12 May 2010.

There was once a 2.4 kilometres (1.5 mi) metre-gauge line connecting Quilon Junction and Ashramam Maidan. During the inauguration of the Kollam-Punalur metre-gauge line in 1904, parts of locomotives which were to be used for Quilon–Schencottah line were shipped to Quilon Port from Tuticorin Port. They were assembled at the Ashramam Maidan, which was an open ground. The line was laid to carry these locomotives to the main station. The line was dismantled in 2000 to allow for city expansion. There was also a turntable in Kollam Junction railway station till 2015. Indian Railways removed it to pave way for the developments related to MEMU Shed.

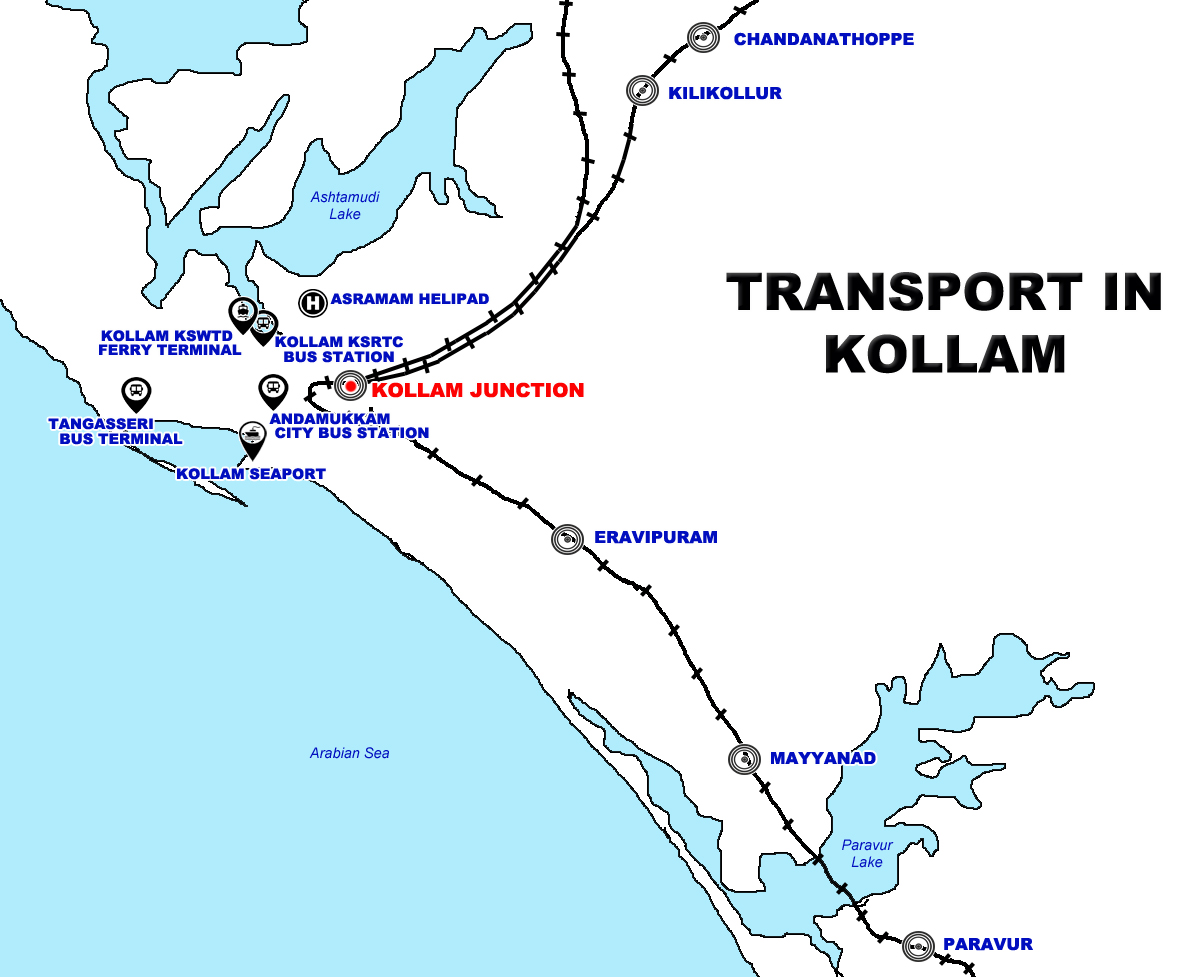
Railway map of Kollam

== Layout ==
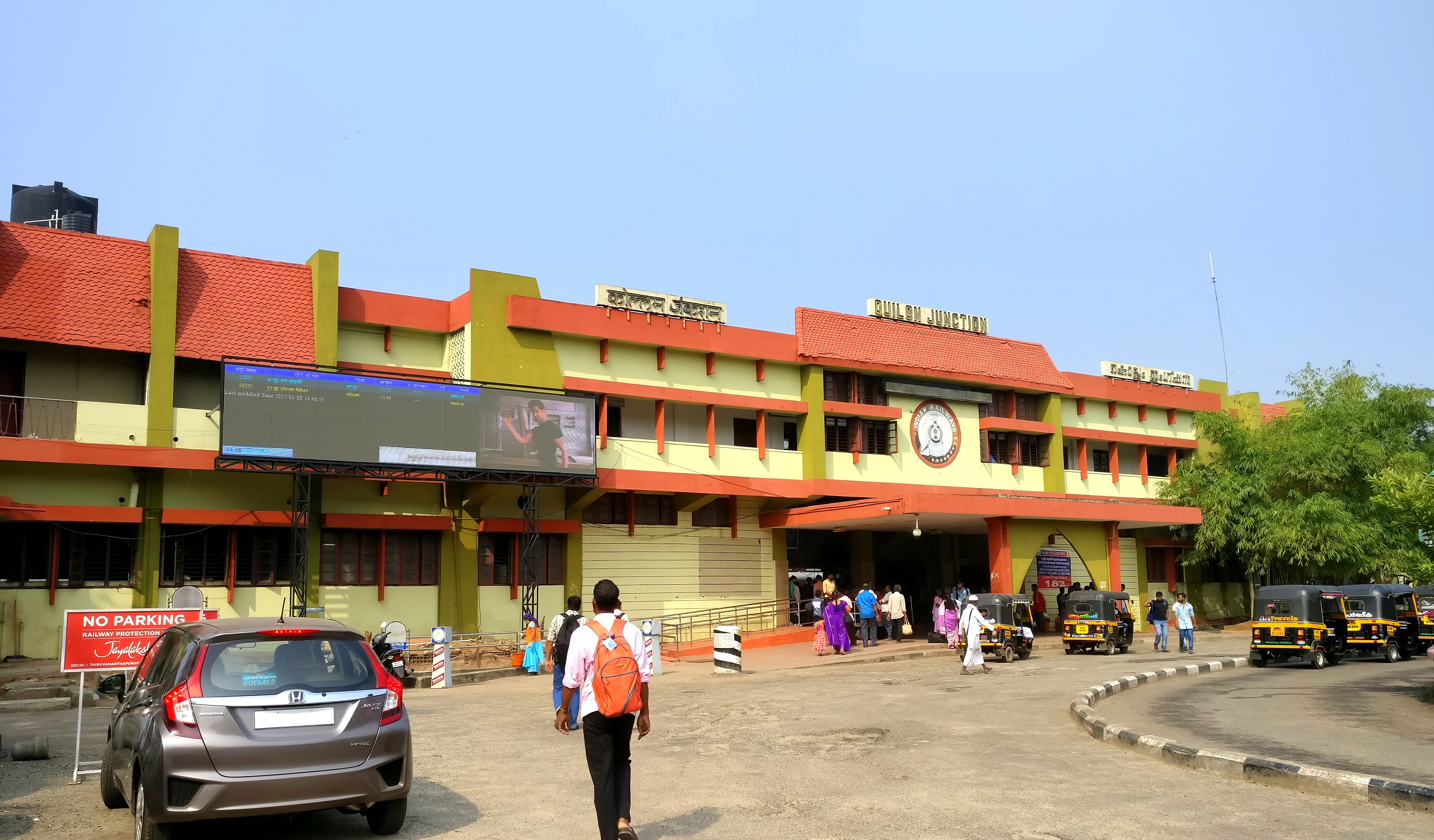
Main terminal building

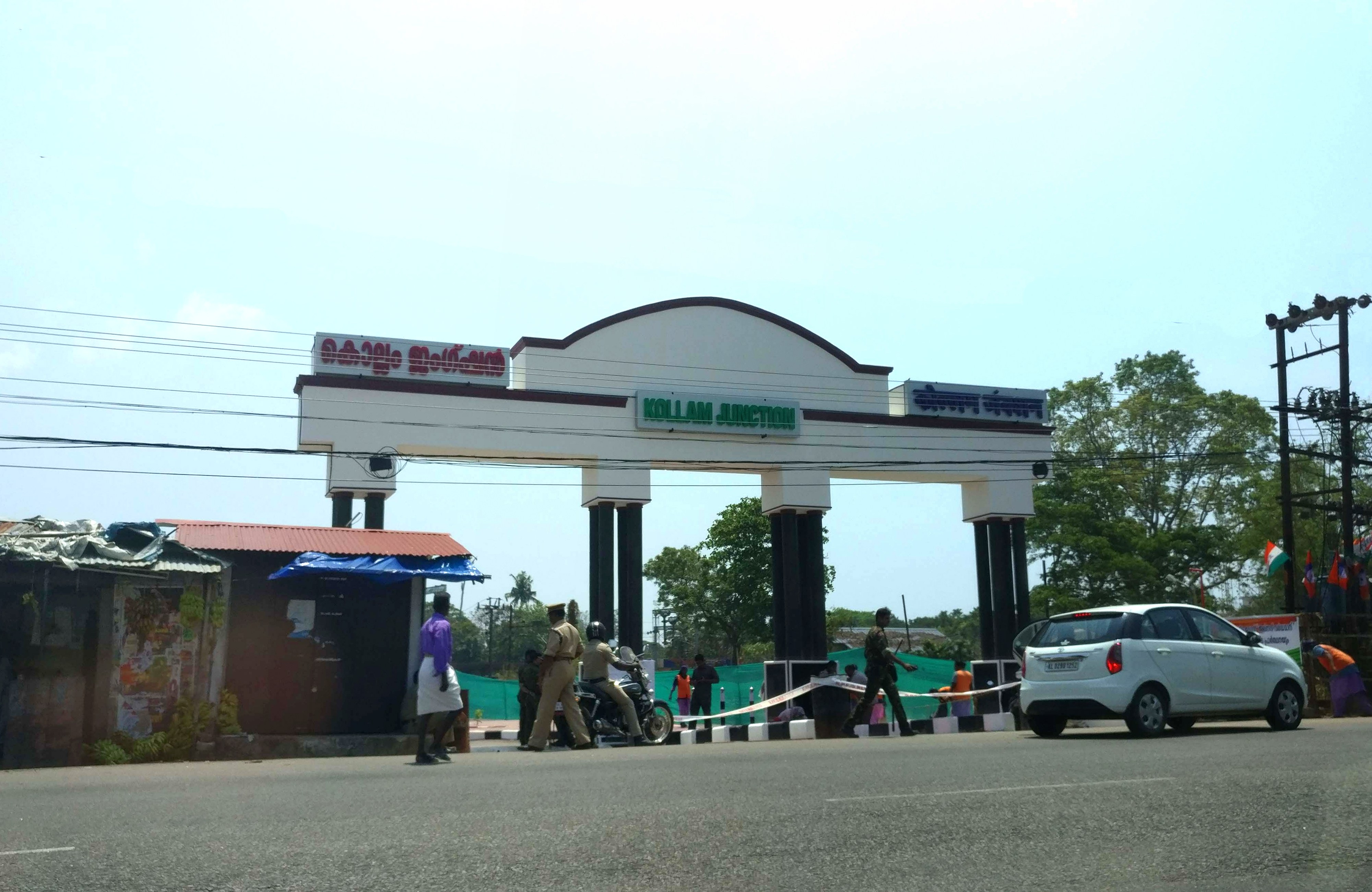
Terminal-2 entrance

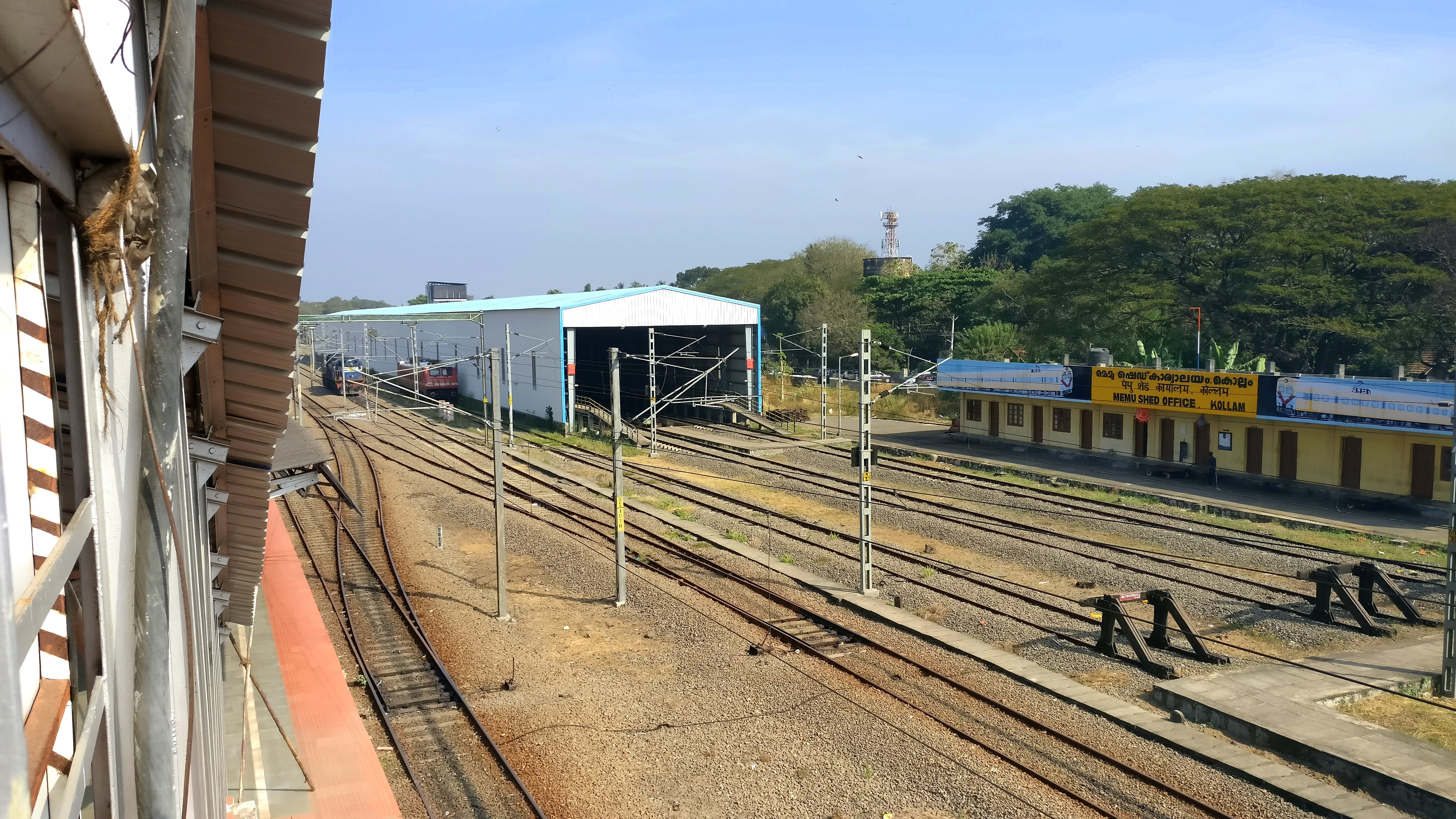
MEMU Carshed and office

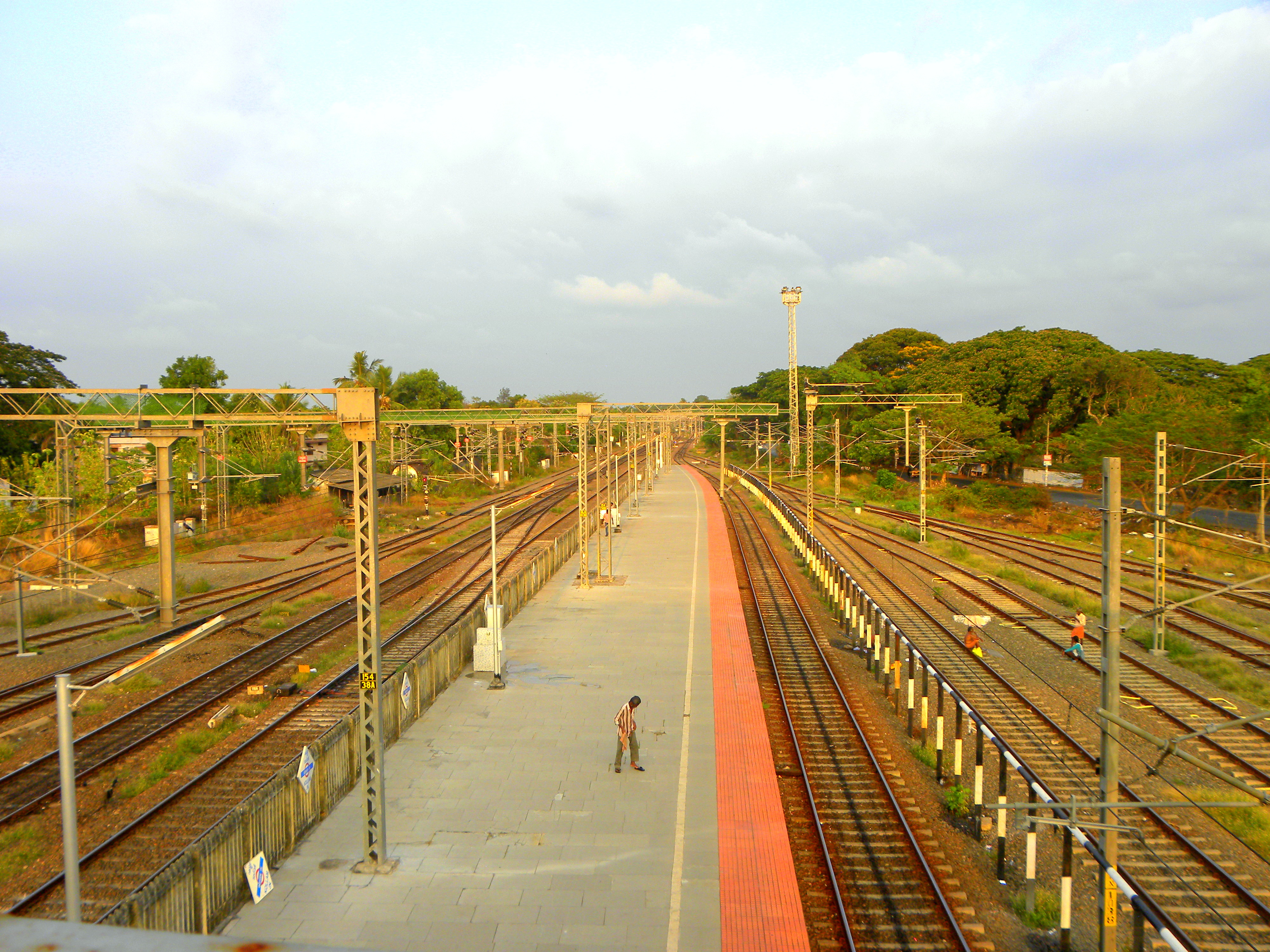
Eastern end of the longest platform in Kollam Junction

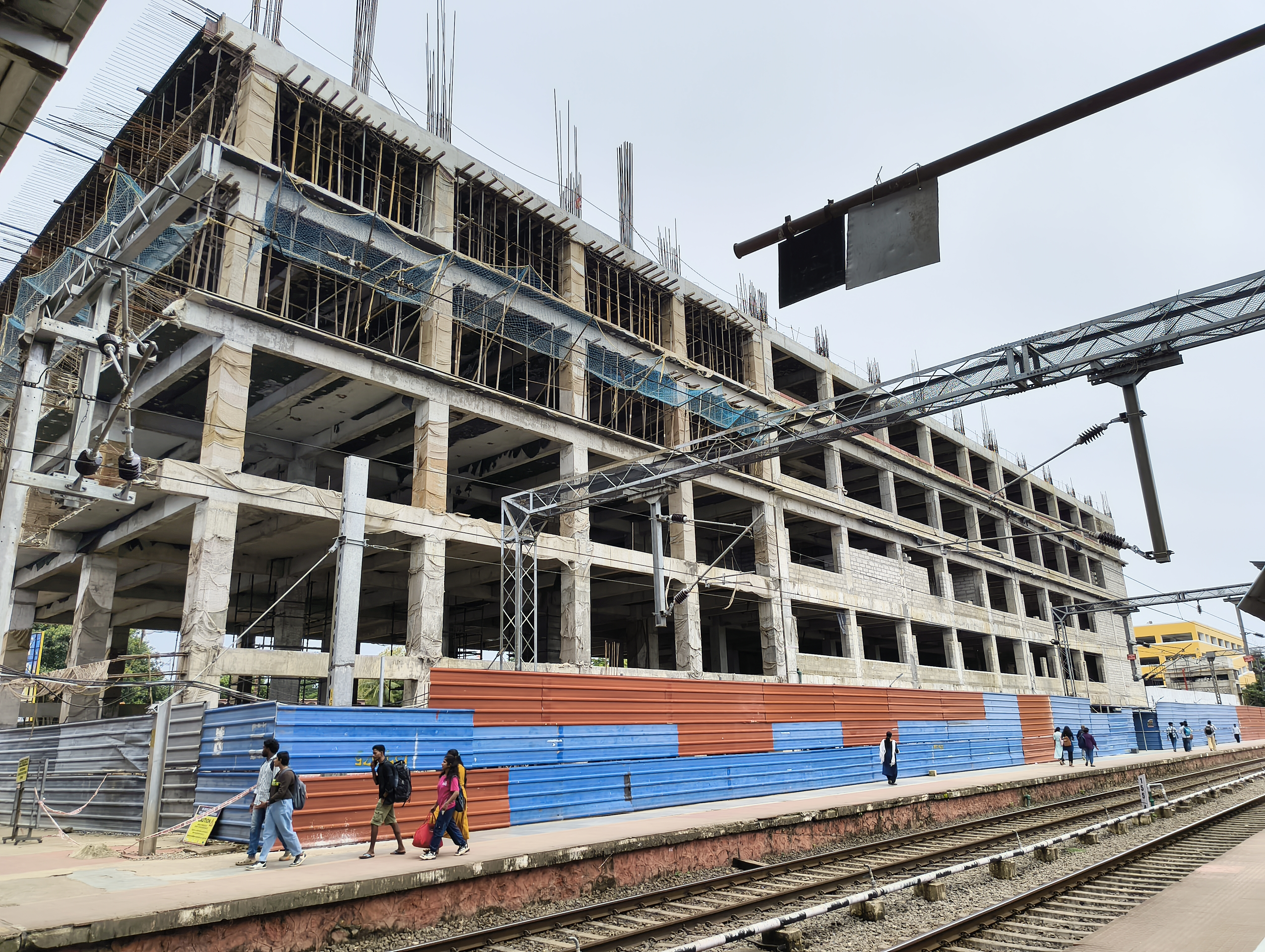
Kollam Railway under construction

There are a total of 17 tracks in the Kollam railway station. Two lines pass through the MEMU shed. The station has six platforms for handling long distance, passenger, MEMU and goods trains. Platform 1 is divided into two sections. Platform 1A handles the trains to Punalur–Sengottai line and platform 1 handles trains towards Trivandrum Central. The platform 1 and 1A together have a length of 1,180.5 m, making them together the third longest railway platform in India. The station has an MEMU shed which is situated near Platform 1A. An FCI godown owned and operated by Food Corporation of India is also situated near Kollam junction.

There are three lines extending from Kollam Junction railway station in three different directions:

- South towards Thiruvananthapuram via Paravur and Varkala
- North towards Ernakulam (Kochi) via Kayamkulam-Alappuzha and Kayamkulam-Kottayam
- East towards Chennai via Punalur-Tenkasi-Madurai

== Location ==
Surrounding transport hubs:

- Nearest bus stations: Andamukkam City bus stand (1.2 km) and Kollam KSRTC Bus Station (2 km)
- Nearest sea port: Kollam Port (3 km)
- Nearest ferry terminal: Kollam KSWTD Ferry Terminal (2 km)
- Nearest airport: Trivandrum International Airport (67 km) and Kollam Helipad (old airport) (0.5 km)

== Services ==
Kollam Junction is one of the six railway stations in Kerala where all 163 trains passing through have a scheduled halt. Out of this, five are long-distance express trains originating from the station.

Express train services originating from Kollam Junction
Sl no.	Train no.	Train name	Destination	Route	Distance
1	18567 / 18568	Visakhapatnam Express	Visakhapatnam Junction	Kottayam, Palakkad, Coimbatore, Gudur, Vijayawada	1,575 km
2	20635 / 20636	Ananthapuri Superfast Express	Chennai Egmore	Thiruvananthapuram, Madurai, Tiruchchirappalli, Villupuram	858 km
3	17421 / 17422	Tirupati Express	Tirupati	Kottayam, Palakkad, Katpadi	828 km
4	16101 / 16102	Quilon Mail	Chennai Egmore	Punalur, Tenkasi, Madurai, Tiruchchirappalli, Villupuram	761 km
5	18501 / 18502	Visakhapatnam Express	Visakhapatnam Junction	Kottayam, Palakkad, Podanur, Gudur, Vijayawada	1,563 km

These services connect Chennai, Visakhapatnam, and Tirupati cities with Kollam.

== Kollam Curve ==
The initial railway line extended from Kollam to Shengottai, oriented in an east-west direction, resulting in the railway station's alignment accordingly. Subsequently, the Ernakulam-Thiruvananthapuram route, which traverses in a north-south direction, was introduced. Approaching from the Thiruvananthapuram side, this route necessitates a sharp turn to enter the station.

The bend is approximately eight degrees Consequently, the maximum speed for trains entering Kollam station from the Thiruvananthapuram side and departing in the same direction is restricted to 30 kmph

== Annual passengers and earnings ==
According to Southern Railway data, Kollam Junction recorded 85,69,871 originating passengers in 2019–20. The most recent figures report 82,75,069 originating passengers for the year 2023–24 and the total passengers is 2,01,80,909 per year. The annual passenger earnings from Kollam railway station shows a steady growth for several decades.

Passenger earnings
Year	Earnings (in crores)	Variation
2011–12	₹38.2105 crore (US$4.0 million)	NA
2012–13	₹43.8898 crore (US$4.6 million)	▲₹5.6793 crore (US$590,000)
2013–14	₹49.5695 crore (US$5.1 million)	▲₹5.6797 crore (US$590,000)
2014–15	₹56.2797 crore (US$5.8 million)	▲₹6.7102 crore (US$700,000)
2015–16	₹60.4467 crore (US$6.3 million)	▲₹4.167 crore (US$430,000)
2016–17	₹60.7804 crore (US$6.3 million)	▲₹0.3337 crore (US$35,000)
2017–18	₹64.2310 crore (US$6.7 million)	▲₹3.4506 crore (US$360,000)
2018–19	₹67.4538 crore (US$7.0 million)	▲₹3.2228 crore (US$330,000)
2019–20	₹68.2169 crore (US$7.1 million)	▲₹0.7631 crore (US$79,000)
2020–21	₹13.5656 crore (US$1.4 million)	▼₹54.6513 crore (US$5.7 million)
2021–22	₹43.3557 crore (US$4.5 million)	▲₹29.7901 crore (US$3.1 million)
2022–23	₹84.8381 crore (US$8.8 million)	▲₹41.4824 crore (US$4.3 million)
2023–24	₹103.0696 crore (US$11 million)	▲₹18.2315 crore (US$1.9 million)
2024–25	₹108.9947 crore (US$11 million)	▲₹5.9251 crore (US$620,000)
2025–26	₹120.8525 crore (US$13 million)	▲₹11.8578 crore (US$1.2 million)

Annual originating passengers
Year	Ridership
2016-17	8,284,504
2017-18	8,412,506(+1.54%)
2018-19	8,499,151(+1.03%)
2019-20	8,569,871(+0.83%)
2020-21	531,049(-93.80%)
2021-22	2,435,390(+358.59%)
2022-23	6,704,147(+175.28%)
2023-24	8,275,069(+23.43%)

== MEMU Shed ==
Kollam MEMU Shed is constructed at a cost of ₹40.68 crore (US$4.2 million), for Mainline Electric Multiple Unit (MEMU) rakes. It was formally commissioned on 1 December 2013, five years after its completion. Now the railways is operating three pairs of Kollam–Ernakulam (via Alappuzha and Kottayam) via both the routes and a Kollam–Kanyakumari (via Trivandrum, Nagercoil) & Kollam - Punalur services from Kollam. Kollam MEMU Shed is the largest MEMU Shed in Kerala, which is equipped with most modern facilities.

== Other suburban railway stations nearby ==
No.	Station	Code	Area	Distance from Kollam Jn.
1	Perinad	PRND	North Kollam	9.1 km
2	Munroturuttu	MQO	North Kollam	14.1 km
3	Kilikollur	KLQ	East Kollam	5.6 km
4	Chandanathoppe	CTPE	East Kollam	7.3 km
5	Kundara	KUV	East Kollam	12.7 km
6	Eravipuram	IRP	South Kollam	4.6 km
7	Mayyanad	MYY	South Kollam	8.9 km
8	Paravur	PVU	South Kollam	12.4 km

== Future ==
Kollam Junction is one among the 25 stations in the country selected for first phase redevelopment at international standards along with Ernakulam Junction and Ernakulam Town stations.

The modernization works of the old terminal, including works for lifts, escalators, and new air conditioned waiting area, has been initiated in the railway station and will be completed within 19 months.

Kollam is among the first 100 railway stations in India selected for providing high-speed Wi-Fi services by Google, named as ‘Project Nilgiri’. There are five railway stations from Kerala in the initial stage. The service inaugurated at Kollam station on 26 December 2016 by Suresh Prabhu, Railway Minister of India, through video conferencing.

On 18 September 2019, Indian Railways assured the modernization of Kollam Junction railway station to international standards. Kollam is one of the five railway stations in Kerala to be modernized.

== Incidents ==
- The engine of 56307 passenger derailed on 6 July 2018.
- The engine of 16723 Express caught fire at Kollam Junction on 16 July 2018.

== Gallery ==
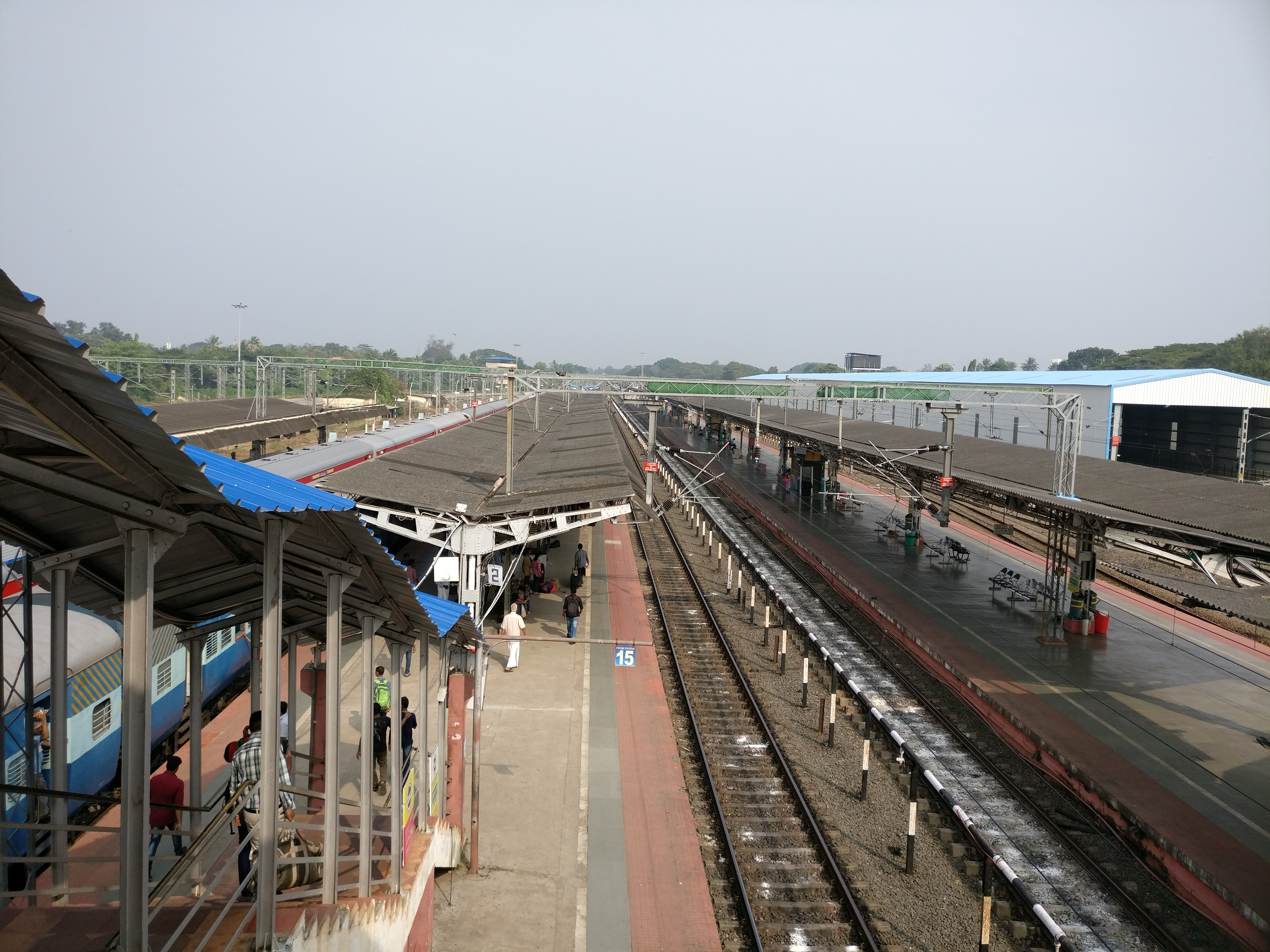
Platform No. 1, 2

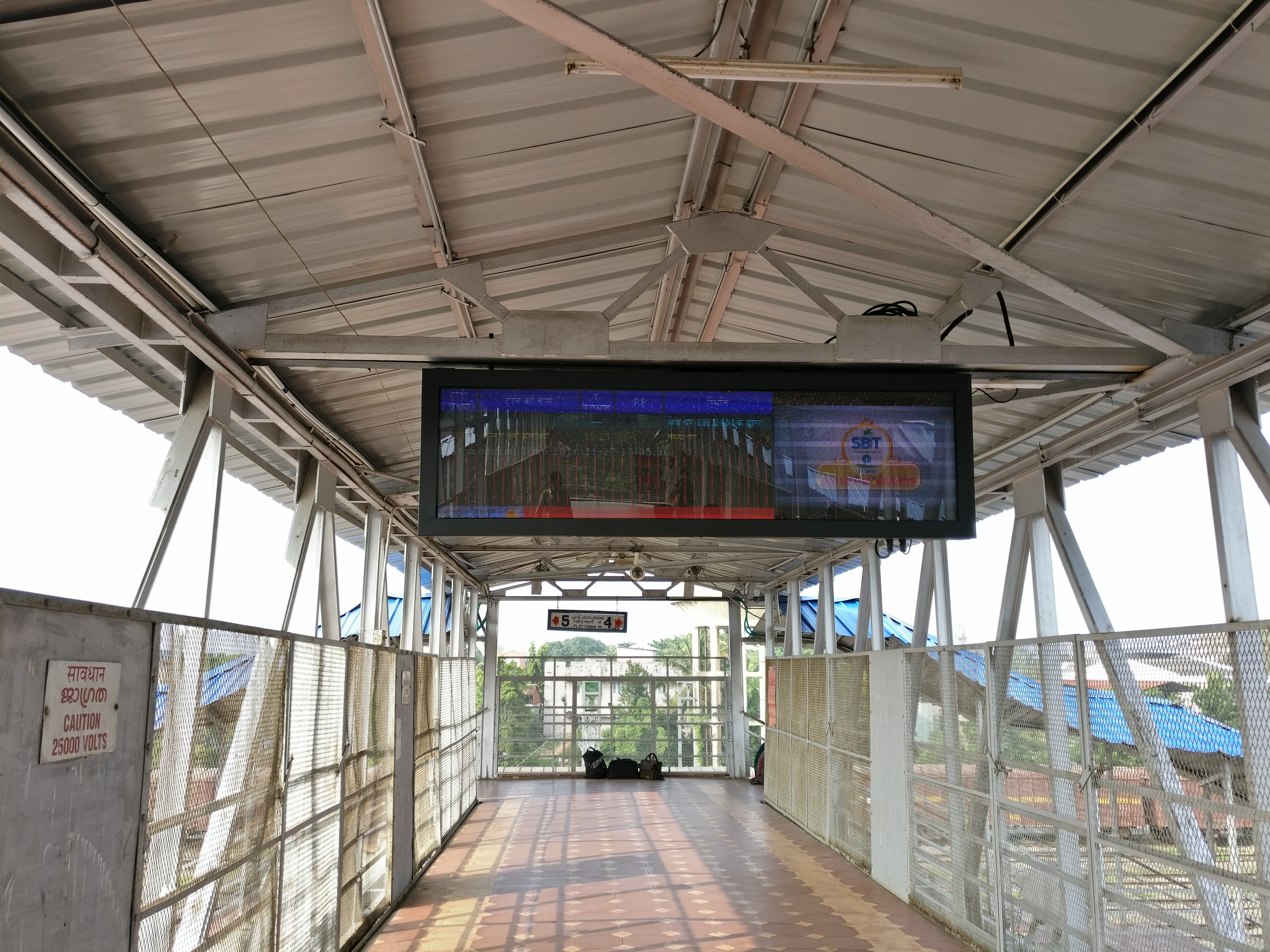
LED display board in the foot over-bridge

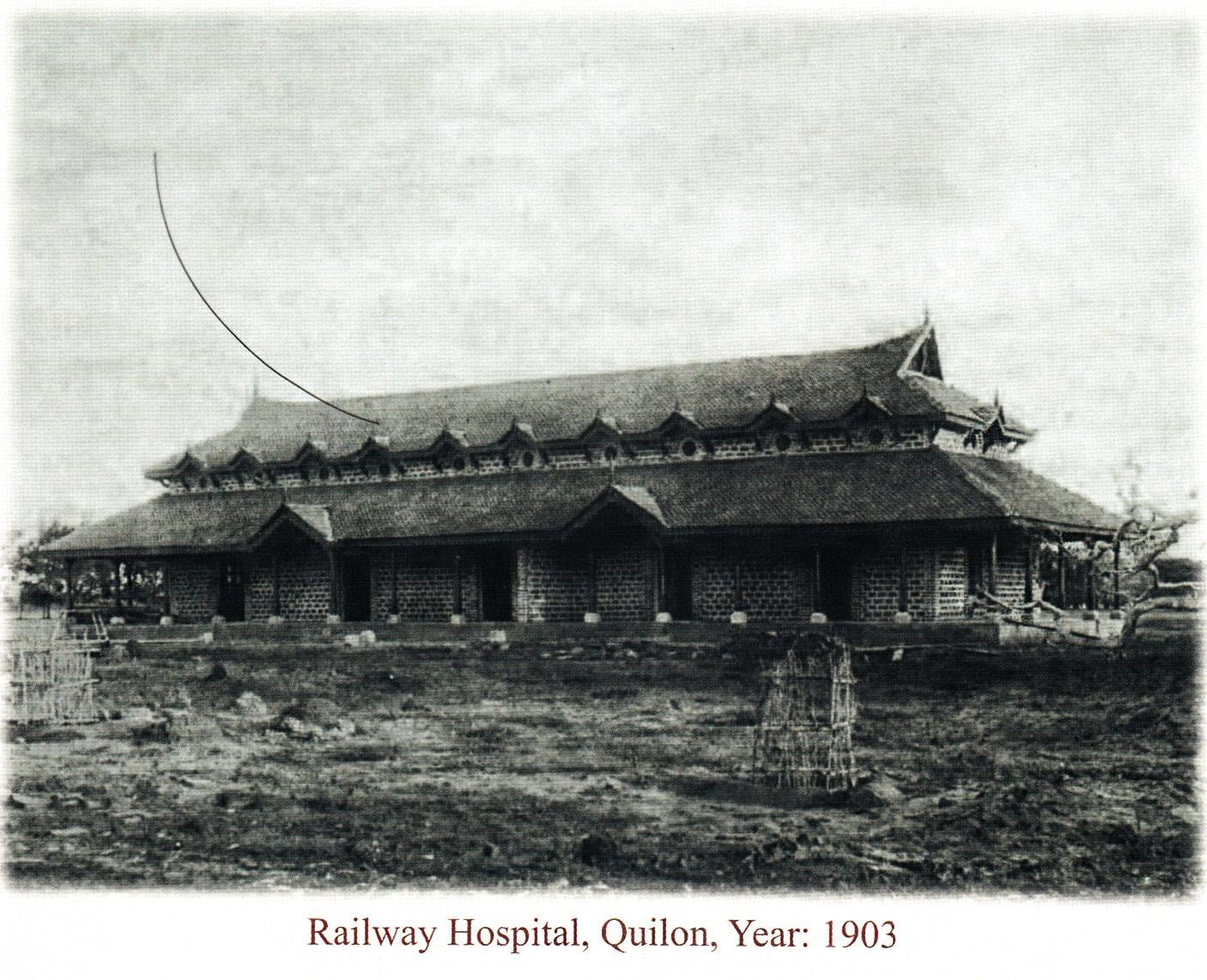
An old picture of Kollam Railway Hospital

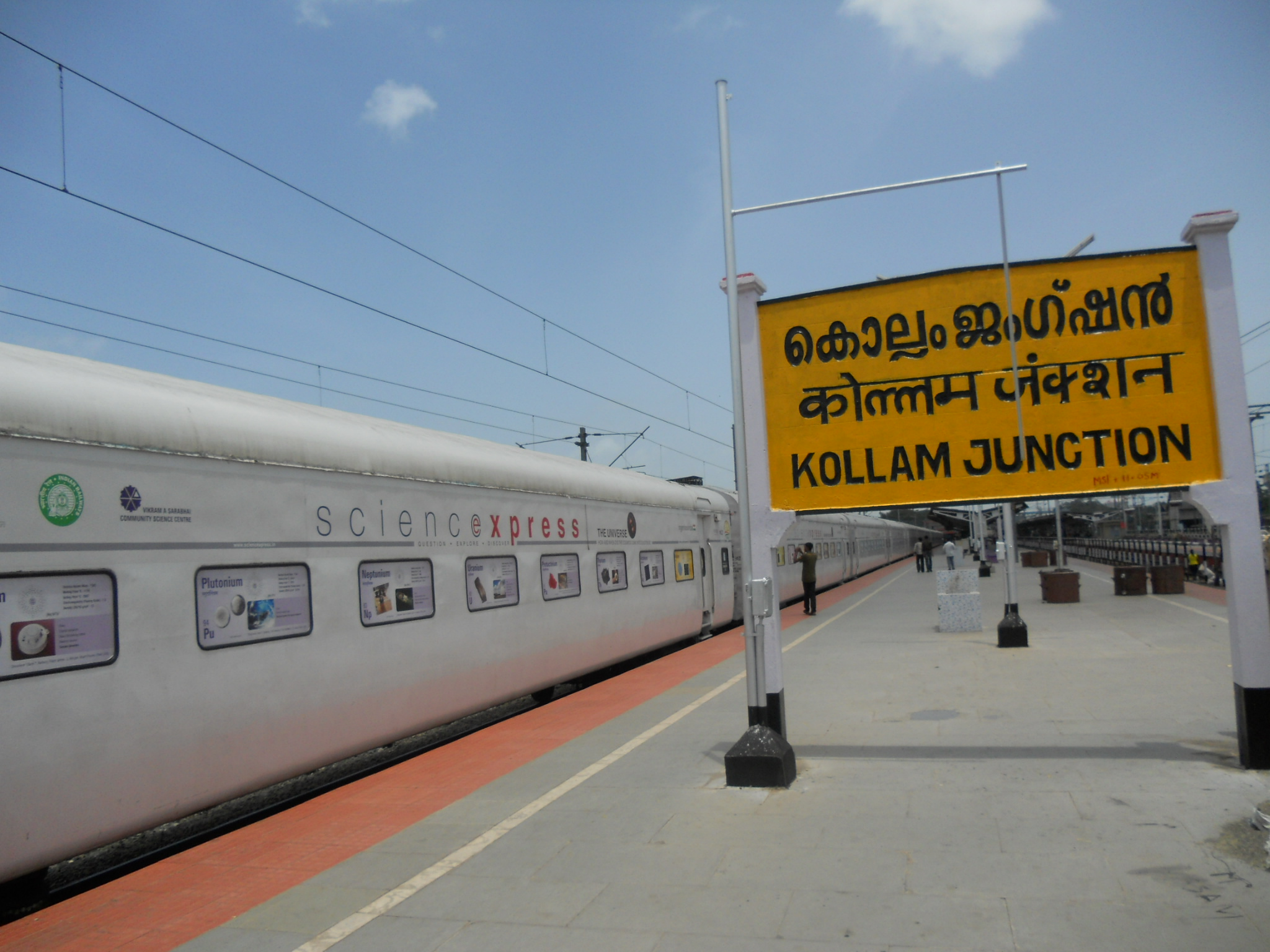
A science express train at the station

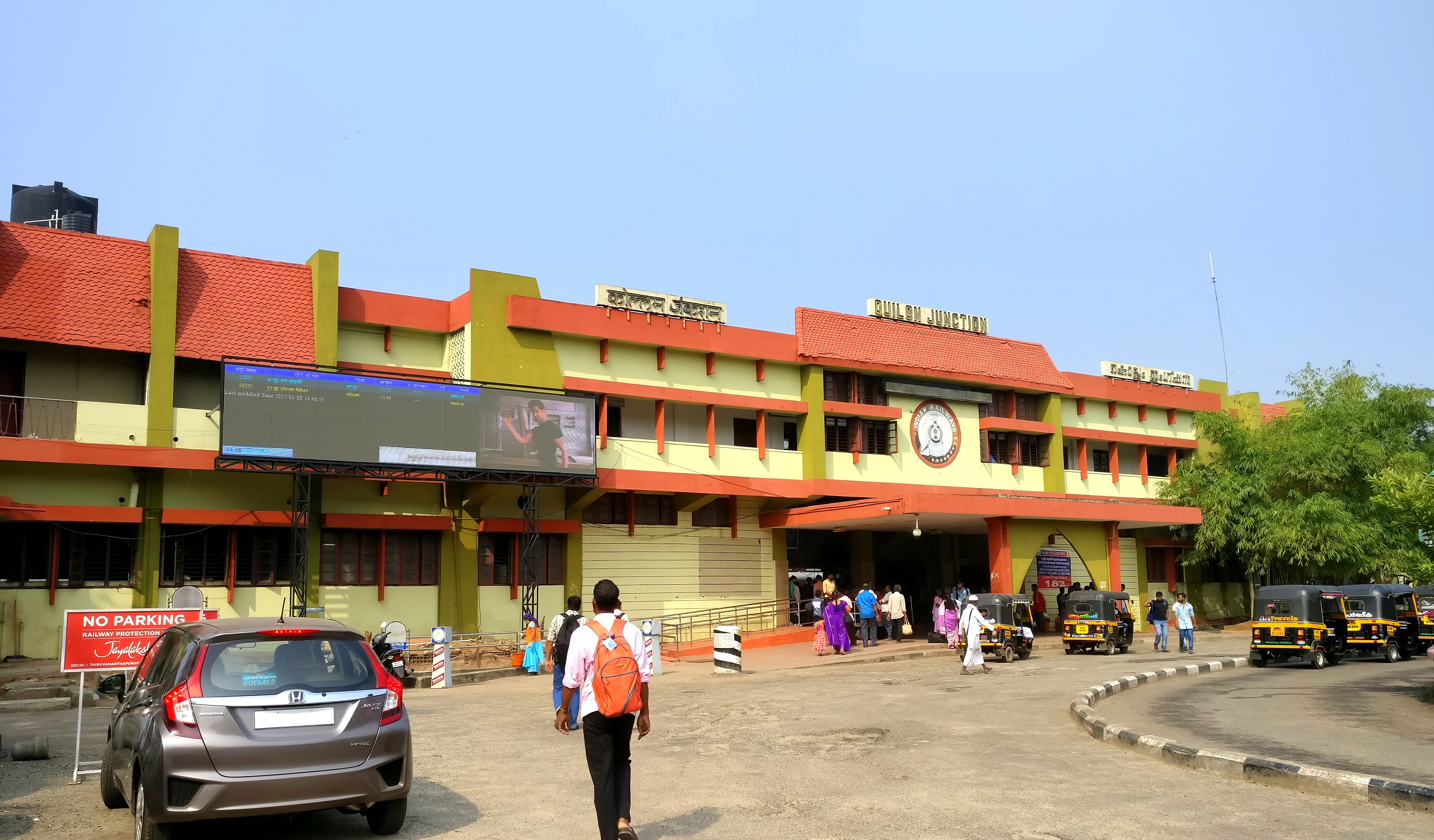
Main terminal

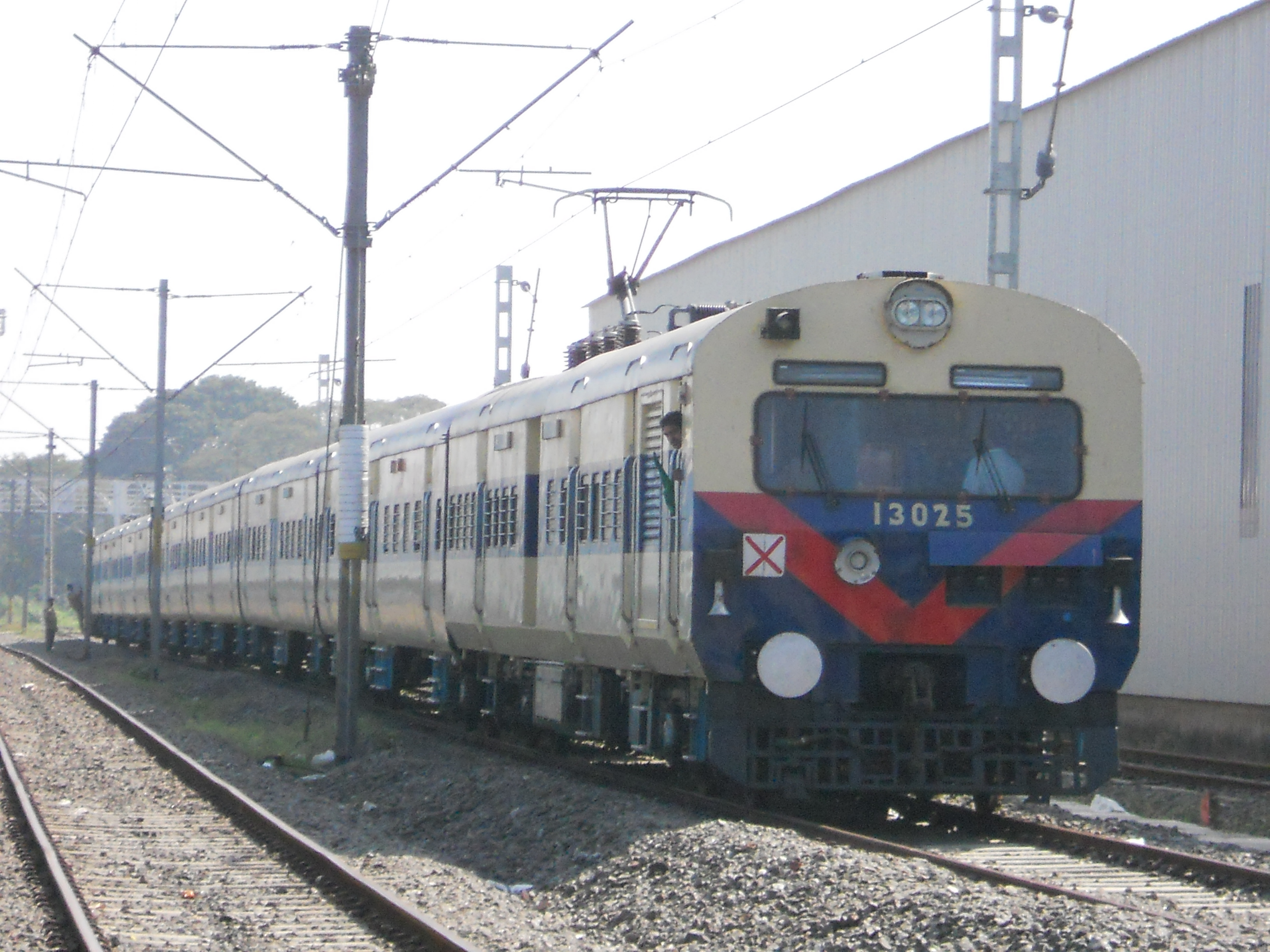
A MEMU train at the station

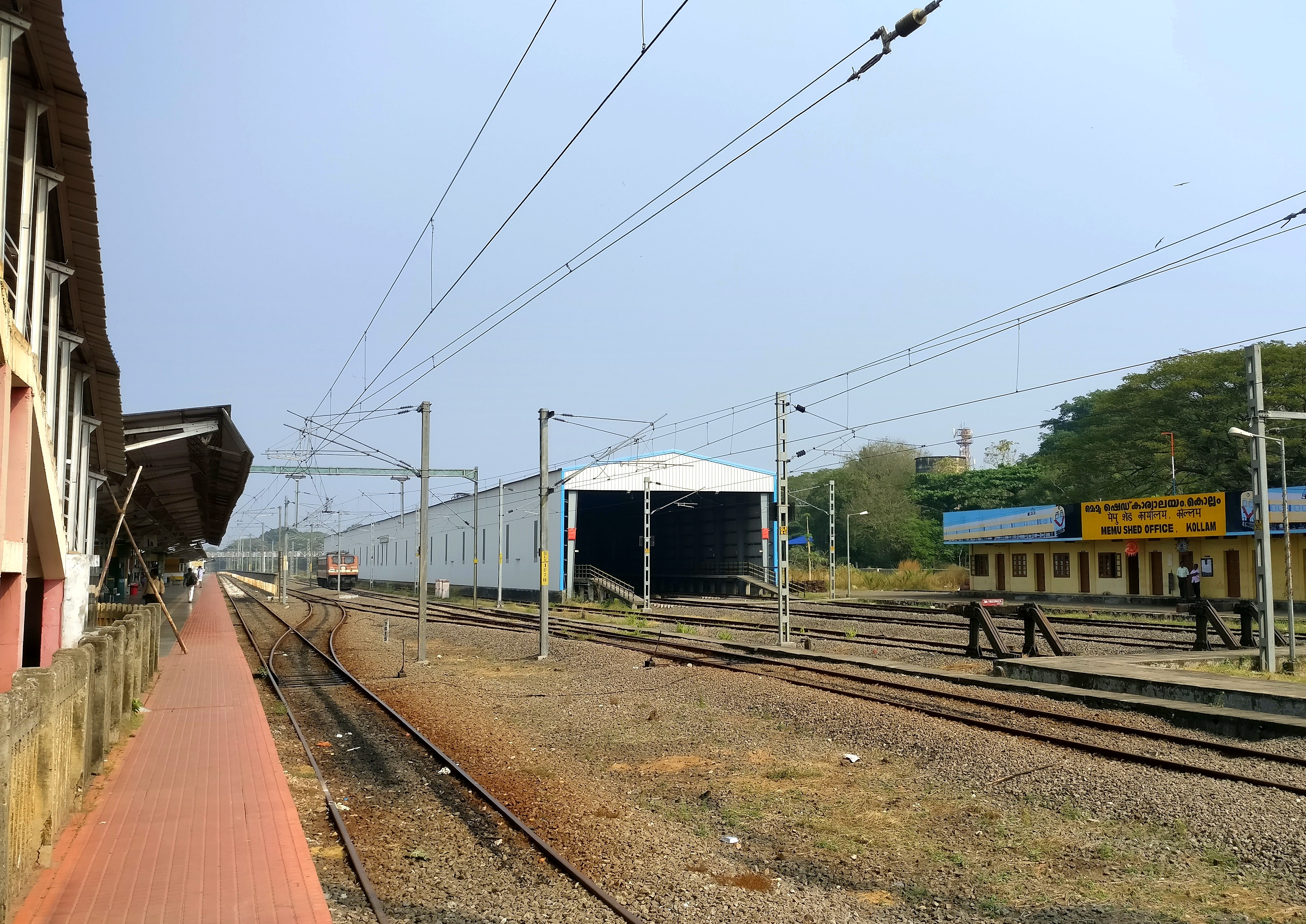
MEMU Carshed and Platform No. 1A

== See also ==
- Kollam
- Railway platform
- Kollam MEMU Shed
- Kollam–Thiruvananthapuram trunk line
- Kollam–Sengottai branch line
- Kilikollur railway station
