= Alappuzha railway station =

Railway station in Kerala, India

Alleppey Alappuzha
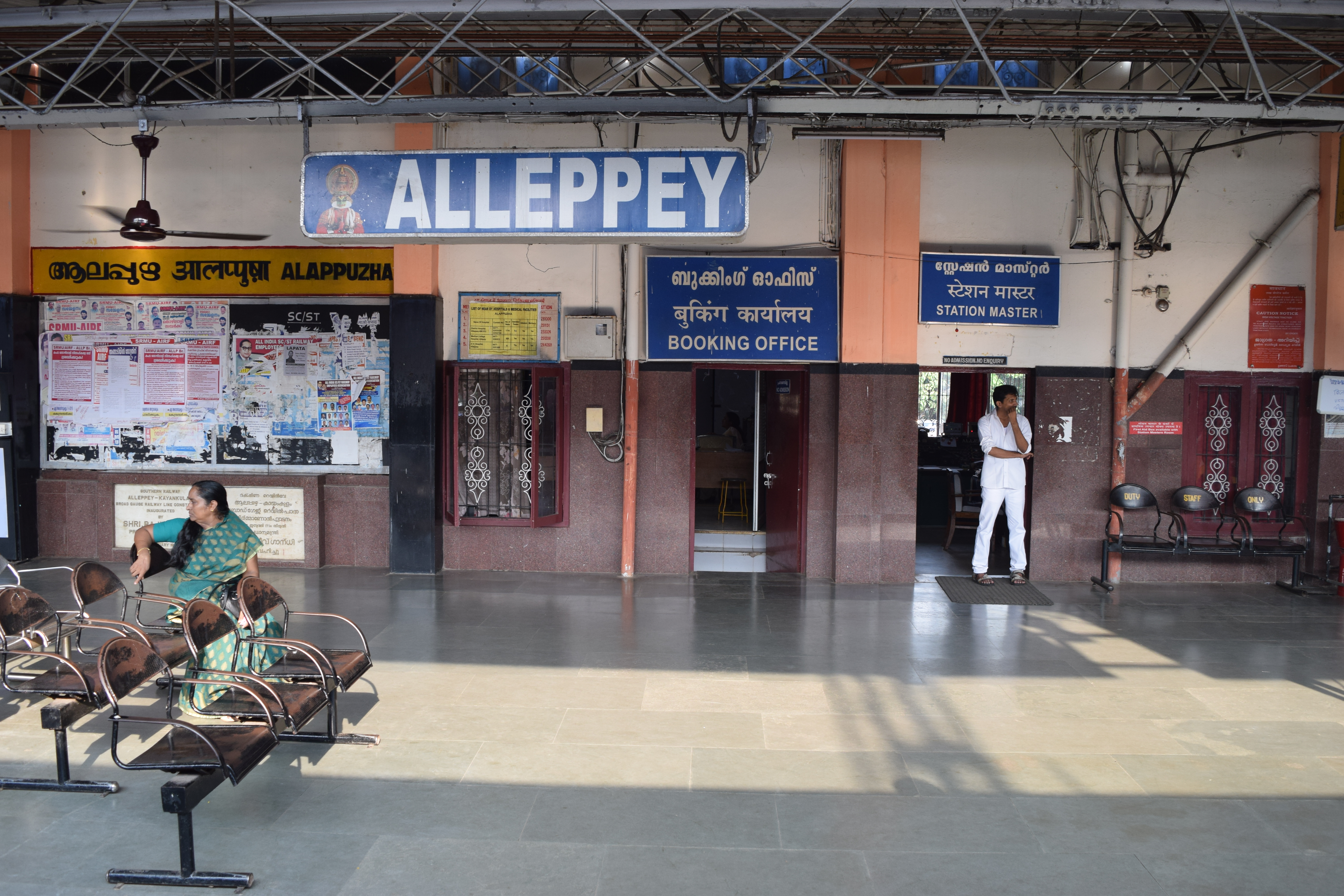
- Alappuzha Railway Station

General information
- Location: Alappuzha, Kerala, India
- Coordinates: 9.4846°N 76.3223°E
- System: Station In Kerala
- Owner: Indian Railways
- Line: Ernakulam–Kayamkulam coastal line
- Platforms: 3 ( 4 th Platform is Under Construction )
- Tracks: 6
- Connections: -

Construction
- Structure type: On Ground
- Depth: 300 m (980 ft)
- Platform levels: 2
- Parking: Available
- Cycle facilities: Yes

Other information
- Station code: ALLP
- Fare zone: Southern Railway zone

History
- Opened: 1989; 37 years ago
- Closed: 2025 March 1
- Rebuilt: 2027 (Expected )

Passengers
- 80,000: 6,536 per day ▲1000%
- 5000

Services
14( Including Passenger Train & Express, Long Distance Trains )
Route map
Location

Alappuzha railway station (also known as Alleppey railway station)(station code: ALLP) is an NSG–3 category Indian railway station in Thiruvananthapuram railway division of Southern Railway zone. It is located in Alappuzha, Kerala and is a major station on the Ernakulam–Kayamkulam coastal line.

== History ==
The Ernakulam South–Alappuzha coastal railway line was opened on 16 October 1989. The railway line was later extended to Kayamkulam in 1992. in railway

== Layout ==
Alappuzha railway station has 3 platforms to handle long distance and passenger trains. Escalators inaugurated at PF#1 of Alappuzha Railway station

== Significance ==
Alappuzha is an important tourist destination in Kerala. The backwaters of Alappuzha are one among the most popular tourist attractions in Kerala. Alappuzha is also the access point for the annual Nehru Trophy Boat Race. Alappuzha railway station thus acts as a gateway for visiting the tourist attractions in and around Alappuzha.

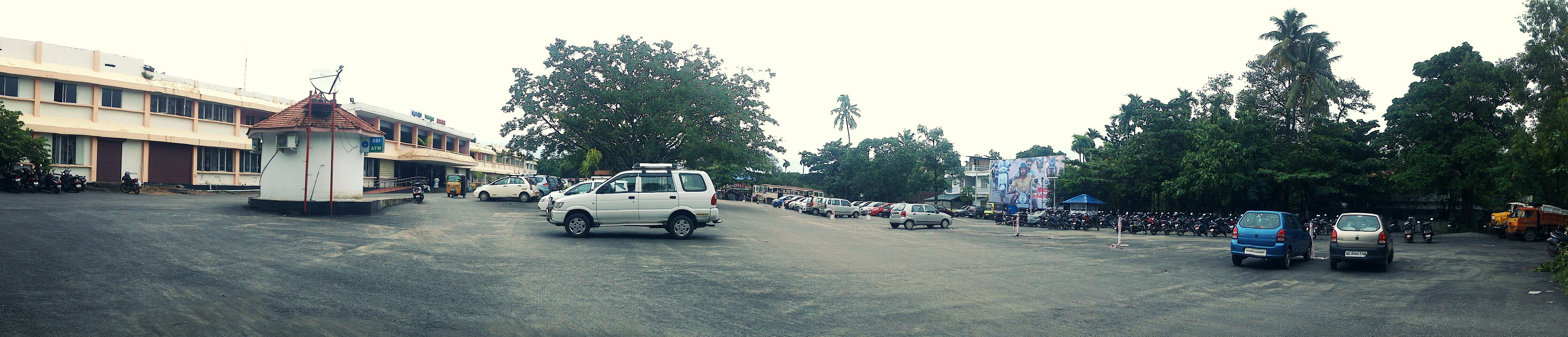
Alappuzha railway station

== Important trains originating from Alappuzha ==
The following trains starting from Alappuzha station:

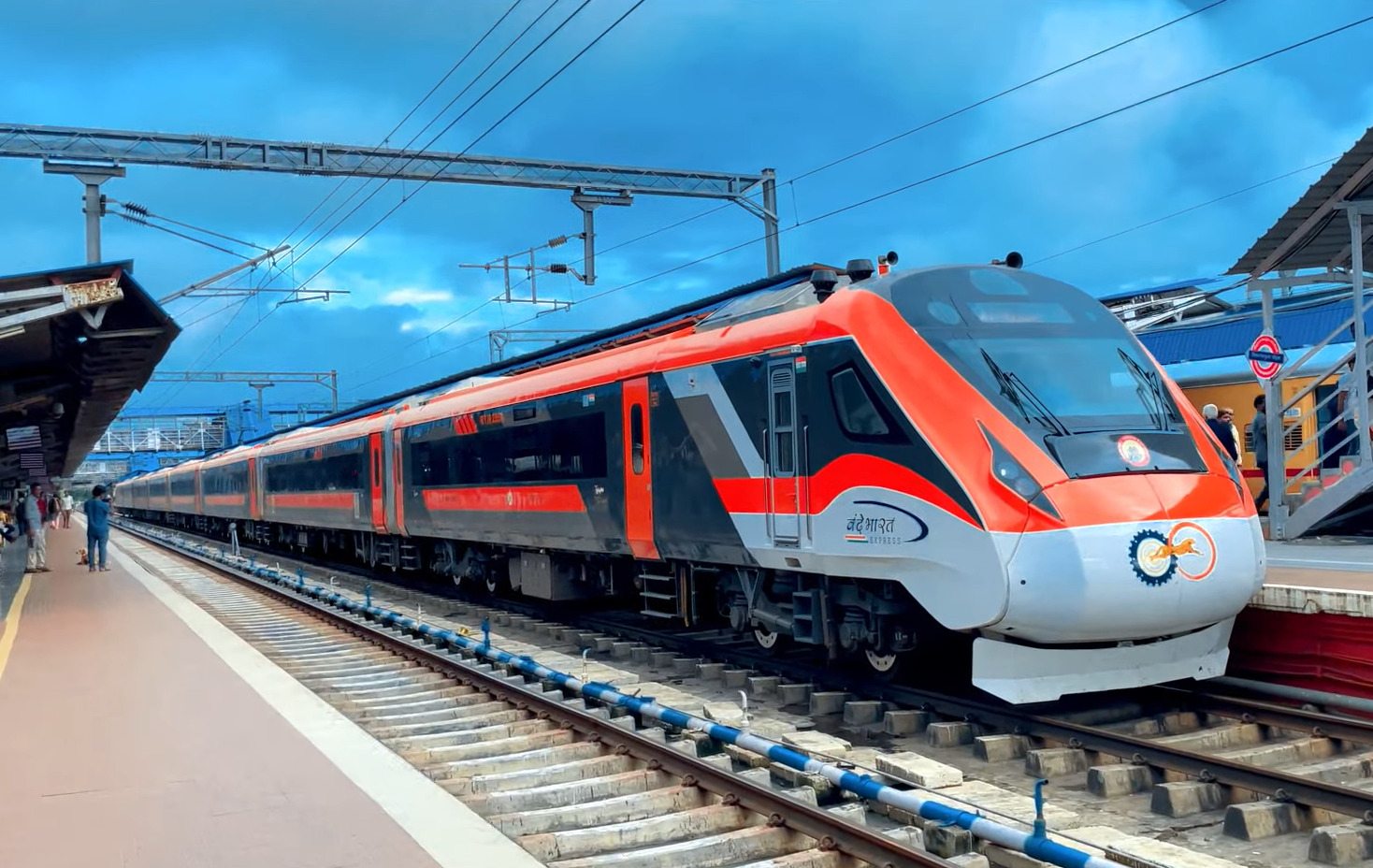
Vande Bharat Express in Alappuzha station.

Train no.	Train name
13351/13352	Dhanbad–Alappuzha Express
22639/22640	Alappuzha–Chennai Express
16307/16308	Alappuzha–Kannur Express

== Major Trains ==
The major trains halting at the station are :

- Mangaluru Central–Thiruvananthapuram Vande Bharat Express (via Alappuzha)

== Facilities ==
An integrated security system was installed at the station in 2012 featuring baggage scanners, CCTVs and vehicle scanners.

- Reservation counters are open between 6:00 am to 8:00 pm
- Retirement rooms (transit lodging facility)
- Parcel booking office
- Railway Mailing service (RMS) office
- Railway Protection Force - Circle office
- IRCTC restaurant
- ATMs
- Pre-paid autorickshaw counters
- Pre-paid parking space
- Escalator and elevator systems

== ATMs ==
The following bank-ATMs are available at the railway station:

- State Bank of India
- Punjab National Bank

== See also ==
- Ernakulam–Kayamkulam coastal line
- Thiruvananthapuram railway division
- Ernakulam Junction railway station

== Sources ==
- https://indiarailinfo.com/departures/alappuzha-alleppey-allp/54
- https://www.trainspnrstatus.com/station/alappuzha
