= Punalur railway station =

Railway station in Kerala, India

Punalur

General information
- Location: Nedumkayam, Punalur, Kollam district, Kerala; India
- Coordinates: 9.023°N 76.916°E
- Elevation: 6.74 metres (22.1 ft)
- System: Express train, Passenger train and Commuter rail station
- Owner: Indian Railways
- Operator: Southern Railway zone
- Line: Kollam–Sengottai chord line
- Platforms: 2
- Tracks: 5

Construction
- Structure type: Standard (on-ground station)
- Parking: Yes
- Cycle facilities: Yes
- Accessible: Yes

Other information
- Status: Functioning
- Station code: PUU
- Zone(s): Southern Railway zone
- Division(s): Madurai
- Fare zone: Southern Railway zone
- Classification: NSG-6

History
- Opened: 1902; 124 years ago

Passengers
- 2016–17: 1774 per day

Services
Preceding station	Indian Railways	Following station
Auvaneeswaram towards	Southern Railway zone Kollam–Sengottai branch line	Edamann towards
Route map
Location

Punalur railway station (station code:PUU) is an NSG–6 category Indian railway station in Madurai railway division of Southern Railway zone. It serves Punalur, located in Kollam district of the Indian state of Kerala.

The temples related to Sabarimala like Achankovil, Aryankavu, and Kulathuppuzha are Located near Punalur. The Kollam–Shencottah railway line is the first railway line in erstwhile Travancore state and is more than a century old. The Kollam–Sengottai section is part of the Kollam–Chennai metre-gauge rail route commissioned by the British during 1904. The line which was metre gauge has been completely converted into broad gauge and train services started.

== History ==
The first idea of rail link from Tirunelveli to Kollam which was the trading capital of the Travancore Kingdom was conceived in 1873. The line was sanctioned by the Madras Presidency in 1899 and the survey was completed in 1900. The railway line was built jointly by South Indian railway, Travancore state and Madras Presidency.It was the ruler's desire to create a rail link between Kollam, the then commercial capital of his State and Madras. The meter gauge line from Kollam to Punalur was inaugurated by on 1 June 1904. The Punalur–Sengottai railway line was inaugurated on 26 November 1904. The construction of the metre-gauge rail route between Kollam–Punalur and Punalur–Shenkottai (Ghats section) along the scenic mountain terrain was started in 1873 by the British engineers and was completed in 1902. Travancore rulers in association with the British prepared the plan for the track through the challenging mountain terrain as it involved construction of long arch bridges over steep valleys and tunnels across the rocky mountains of Western Ghats.

The first goods train travelled on this route in 1902 and a train carrying its first passengers began its run in 1904. It makes a long train journey as it passes over five big bridges and hundreds of minor ones while passing thru mountain streams and valleys. Passengers are also provided a overlooking view of the Western Ghats. The train also passes through five tunnels on this stretch, including the one-kilometer long tunnel between Bhagawathipuram and Arayankavu. The station at Punalur was equipped with locomotive service centre, Parcel and Timber Depot, Train parking bays, Storage Tanks for water and oil, etc. The scenic Punalur–Shencotta railway lies across the western ghats, providing a valuable link across the southern states.

== Layout ==
The station has three platforms, of which two are functional. It also has five tracks used for passenger and shunting purpose.

== Gauge conversion ==
The Punalur–Sengottai section is part of the 325-kilometre (202 mi) Kollam–Sengottai–Tenkasi–Tirunelveli–Thiruchendur gauge conversion project and part of the Tenkasi–Virudhunagar trunk route to Chennai at an estimate of ₹320 crore (US$33 million). The gauge conversion of the Thiruchendur-Sengottai section has been completed and is open to traffic. In Kollam Junction–Shenkottai section the broad gauge conversion is also finished. Now it is serving as the shortest rail-route from Kochi port to Tuticorin port. Infrastructure of the station will be changed as proposed in tune with handling demands and matching to the glory of past.

=== Kollam–Punalur section ===
The Kollam Junction–Punalur metre-gauge railway line to broad-gauge conversion works foundation stone was laid in 1998 at Punalur. Services on the Punalur–Kollam metre-gauge section were withdrawn on 1 May 2007, to facilitate the gauge conversion work. The gauge conversion took almost 11 years to complete after the foundation stone was laid. The 44 kilometres (27 mi) line was converted to broad gauge and inaugurated on 10 May 2010. Express and Passenger train services connecting Punalur to Chennai, Tirunelveli Junction, Palakkad Junction, Kollam Junction, Madurai, Guruvayur and Kanyakumari are currently operational in this route.

=== Punalur–Sengottai section ===
To facilitate the gauge conversion work on the Punalur–Sengottai section, train services on the section were withdrawn in September 2010. The 49.2 kilometres (30.6 mi) Punalur–Sengottai section gauge conversion works is in progress currently and expected to get completed by 2017. Sections like Punalur–Edamon reach and Sengottai–Bhagavathipuram reach have been completed and open for traffic,

== Electrification ==
- 2022 - Electrification of Kollam - Punalur stretch completed.
- 2023 - Electrification of Punalur - Edamon stretch and Sengottai - Bhagavathipuram stretch completed.
- 2024 - The pending electrification works between Edamon and Bhagavatipuram completed. Thus the entire Kollam–Sengottai line is electrified.

Though electrification is completed, the trains with electric locos will be operated once the Traction Sub Stations at Punalur and Sengottai are ready.

== Services ==
The station presently handles six express trains services to Kollam Junction, Ernakulam Junction, Palakkad Junction, Tirunelveli Junction, Velankanni, Chennai Egmore and eight passenger train services, of which four services ply to Kollam Junction, one of the passenger trains run between Punalur and Sengottai, while one pair each run from Punalur to Madurai Junction, Kanyakumari.

== Future ==
1. A new railway line is proposed from Sabarimala to Thiruvananthapuram via Punalur. If this proposed Sabarimala Railway is connected to proposed new railway terminal at Nemom near Thiruvananthapuram via Nedumangad, several long-distance trains are supposed to be operated from Nemom terminal via Punalur to Chennai/Bangalore and rest of country.
2. MEMU (Multiple Engine Multiple Unit ) / DEMU (Diesel Multiple Unit) services would be launched in Kollam–Punalur section soon.
3. New Express trains connecting Ernakulam to Tuticorin, Mangalore to Tuticorin, Guruvayur to Rameshwaram, Karaikkal to Kochuveli, Nizamuddin to Kochuveli and Bangalore to Kochuveli is also proposed in this route, waiting for RB approval.

== See also ==
- List of railway stations in India
