= Kanniyakumari Terminus railway station =

Railway station in Tamil Nadu, India

Kanniyakumari Cape Comorin
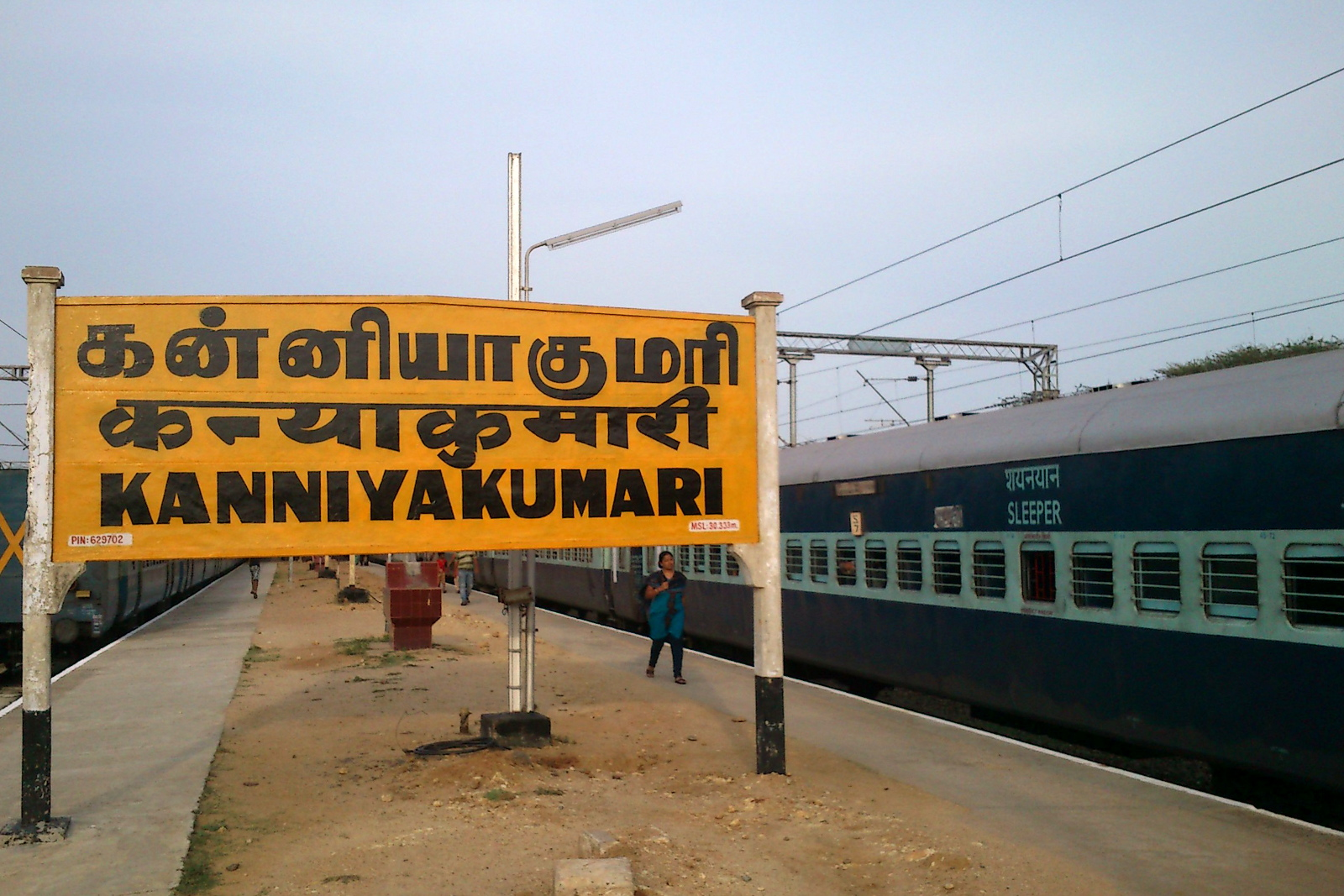
- A platform of the station

General information
- Location: National Highway 44, Kanniyakumari, Tamil Nadu,
- Coordinates: 8°5′16″N 77°32′48″E
- Elevation: 36 metres (118 ft)
- System: Express train & Passenger train station
- Owner: Indian Railways
- Operator: Southern Railway
- Line: Nagercoil – Kanniyakumari railway line
- Platforms: 5
- Tracks: 7
- Connections: Taxi stand, Auto rickshaw stand

Construction
- Structure type: Standard on-ground
- Depth: 200 ft (61 m)
- Platform levels: 1
- Accessible: Disabled access

Other information
- Status: Functioning
- Station code: CAPE
- Zone(s): Southern Railway zone

History
- Opened: 1979; 47 years ago
- Closed: Partially
- Rebuilt: Undergoing
Route map
Location
- Location within India Location within Tamil Nadu

Kanniyakumari railway station (formerly Cape Comorin railway station), (station code:- CAPE) is an NSG–4 category Indian railway station in Thiruvananthapuram railway division of Southern Railway zone. It is a railway terminus of the Indian Railways serving the coastal town of Kanyakumari in the state of Tamil Nadu. It is the southernmost railway station on the Indian mainland.

== Administration ==
It is a part of the Thiruvananthapuram railway division of Southern Railway zone. The Kanyakumari rail station is located in the heart of Kanyakumari and is only 1 kilometre (0.62 mi) away from Kanyakumari beach.

== Projects and development ==
It is one of the 73 stations in Tamil Nadu to be named for upgradation under Amrit Bharat Station Scheme of Indian Railways.

== New lines in proposal ==
Indian Railways were planning for an East Coast Railway Route starting from Chennai to Kanyakumari via Cuddalore, Karaikudi, Ramanathapuram, Tuticorin. The surveys were done in a phase by phase manner and submitted for approvals, but the Railway board shelved the project in 2018.
