= Karunagappalli railway station =

Railway station in Kerala, India

Karunagappalli
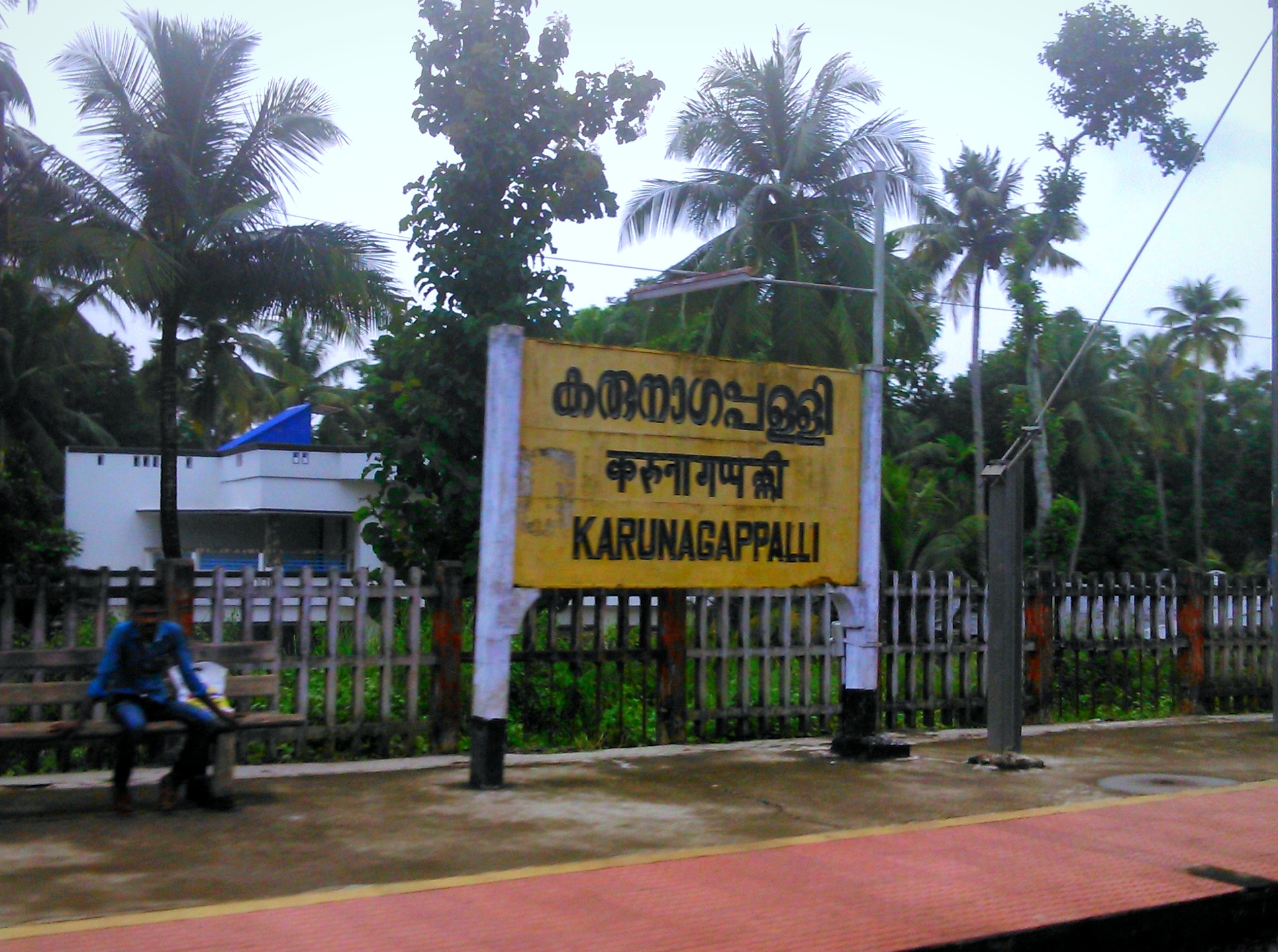

General information
- Location: Edakkulangara, Karunagappalli, Kollam, Kerala; India
- Coordinates: 9.0672°N 76.5441°E
- System: Southern Railways
- Owner: Indian Railways
- Operator: Southern Railway zone
- Line: Ernakulam–Kottayam-Kollam line
- Platforms: 3
- Tracks: 5

Construction
- Structure type: Standard (on-ground station)
- Parking: Available
- Accessible: Disabled access

Other information
- Status: Functioning
- Station code: KPY
- Zone(s): Southern Railway zone
- Division(s): Thiruvananthapuram
- Fare zone: Indian Railways
- Classification: NSG-4

History
- Opened: 1958; 68 years ago
- Electrified: 25 kV AC 50 Hz

Passengers
- 2025-26: 13150 per day Annual Passengers – 48,00,000
Route map
Location

Karunagappalli railway station (station code: KPY) is an NSG–4 category Indian railway station in Thiruvananthapuram railway division of Southern Railway zone. The railway station serves the town of Karunagappalli in Kollam district, Kerala. It is the nearest railway station to Amritapuri.

== Services ==
Express trains having halt at the station.

No.	Train no	Origin	Destination	Train name
1.	16347/16348	Thiruvananthapuram Central	Mangalore Central	Mangalore Express
2.	16603/16604	Thiruvananthapuram Central	Mangalore Central	Maveli Express
3.	16629/16630	Thiruvananthapuram Central	Mangalore Central	Malabar Express
4.	16301/16302	Thiruvananthapuram Central	Shoranur Junction	Venad Express
5.	16303/16304	Thiruvananthapuram Central	Ernakulam Junction	Vanchinad Express
6.	16841/16842	Thiruvananthapuram Central	Guruvayur	Guruvayur–Thiruvananthapuram Intercity Express
7.	16349/16350	Kochuveli	Nilambur Road	Rajya Rani Express
8.	16649/16650	Nagercoil Junction	Mangalore Central	Parasuram Express
9.	16381/16382	Mumbai CST	Kanyakumari	Kanyakumari–Mumbai Express
10.	16525/16526	Bangalore City	Kanyakumari	Island Express
11.	16345/16346	Thiruvananthapuram Central	Lokmanya Tilak Terminus	Netravati Express
12.	16343/16344	Thiruvananthapuram Central	Madurai Junction	Amritha Express
13.	16605/16606	Nagercoil Junction	Mangalore Central	Ernad Express
14.	18567/18568	Kollam Junction	Vishakapatnam	Kollam–Visakhapatnam Express
15.	17229/17230	Thiruvananthapuram Central	Hyderabad	Sabari Express
16.	16791/16792	Tirunelveli Junction	Palakkad	Palaruvi Express
17.	_6327/_6328	Punalur	Guruvayur	Punalur<<>>Guruvayur Express
18	16361/16362	Ernakulam Jn	Velankanni	Express

Passenger trains having halt at the station

No.	Train no	Origin	Destination	Train name
1.	66311/66312	Kollam Junction	Alappuzha	MEMU
2.	56391/56392	Kollam Junction	Ernakulam	Passenger
3.	56305	Kottayam	Kollam Junction	Passenger
4.	56304	Nagercoil Junction	Kottayam	Passenger
5.	66300/66301	Kollam Junction	Ernakulam	MEMU
6.	66307/66308	Ernakulam	Kollam Junction	MEMU
7.	66309/66310	Kollam Junction	Ernakulam Junction	MEMU
8.	66317/66318	Kottayam	Kollam Junction	MEMU
9.	66302/66303	Kollam Junction	Ernakulam	MEMU

== See also ==
- List of railway stations in India
