= Paravur railway station =

Railway station in Paravur, Kollam

Paravur
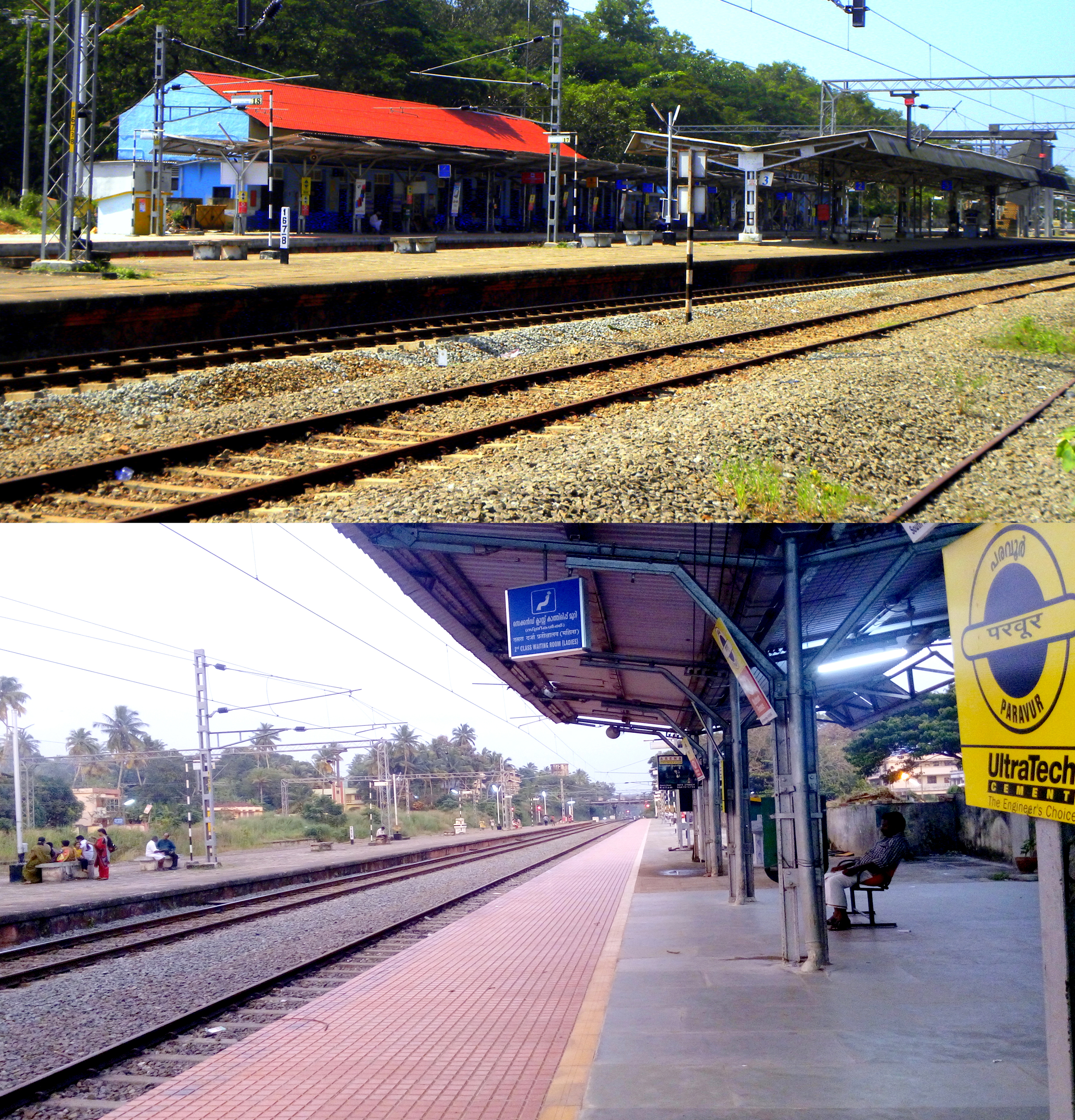
- View of Paravur station from north and platform No.1

General information
- Location: Paravur, Kollam, Kerala; India
- Coordinates: 8.81515°N 76.669°E
- System: Regional rail, Light rail & Commuter rail station
- Owner: Indian Railways
- Operator: Southern Railway zone
- Line: Kollam–Thiruvananthapuram line
- Platforms: 3
- Tracks: 5

Construction
- Structure type: At–grade
- Parking: Available

Other information
- Status: Functioning
- Station code: PVU
- Zone(s): Southern Railway zone
- Division(s): Thiruvananthapuram
- Fare zone: Indian Railways
- Classification: NSG-5

History
- Opened: 1918; 108 years ago
- Electrified: 25 kV AC 50 Hz

Passengers
- 2018–19: 2,761 (per day); 1,007,717 (Annually)

Services
Preceding station	Indian Railways	Following station
Mayyanad towards	Southern Railway zone Kollam–Thiruvananthapuram trunk line	Kappil towards
Route map
Location

Paravur railway station (station code: PVU) is an NSG–5 category Indian railway station in Thiruvananthapuram railway division of Southern Railway zone. It is a railway station in the Indian municipal town of Paravur in Kollam district, Kerala. Paravur railway station was formerly a D-class railway station.

The annual passenger earnings of Paravur railway station during 2023–2024 is Rs. 2,12,46,999 and it is fifth in position from Kollam district among the stations collecting more than Rs.1,00,00,000 through passenger tickets.

Paravur is connected to various cities in India like Kollam, Trivandrum, Ernakulam, Calicut, Thrissur, Kannur, Bengaluru, Chennai, Mumbai, Madurai, Kanyakumari, Mangalore, Pune, Salem, Coimbatore, Trichy and Tirunelveli through Indian Railways. 34 trains halt at Paravur, out of which 32 are daily services. Proximity of Paravur railway station to the core Paravur town and Paravur Municipal Bus Stand is making it as one of the important public transport hubs in the district and the state.

== History ==
The Madras–Quilon line was extended to the capital of the Princely State of Travancore. Paravur railway station was opened on 4 January 1918 along with the inauguration of Quilon–Trivandrum Central metre-gauge line. During that time, Paravur was the most important railway station between Kollam and Trivandrum with maximum number of halts of trains. Important trains like Chennai Mail had halt at Paravur then.

== Layout ==
The Paravur railway station has 3 platforms for handling passenger trains. The station has a single entrance near to platform 1.

== Location ==
Surrounding transport hubs:

- Nearest bus stand: Paravur Municipal Bus Stand (800m)
- Nearest major rail head: Kollam Junction
- Nearest airport: Trivandrum International Airport (67 km)

== Significance ==
Paravur is a tourism spot with estuaries, backwaters and beaches. Estuaries in Paravur attracts a good number of people. Paravur railway station is located at Paravur town centre, which gained in significance because of proximity to famous Puttingal Temple, Kollam Government Medical College in Parippally, proposed Kinfra Park in Polachira, LPG filling station in Ezhippuram (Parippally) etc. It is the only railway station in the Chathannoor constituency. People from Paravur municipal region and neighbouring Poothakkulam, Chathannoor, Chirakkara, Kappil (part of Edava panchayath) and Parippally panchayats are depending on this railway station. Paravur railway station is declared as the gateway station of Government Medical College Hospital, Kollam.

== Annual passenger earnings and footfall ==
Year	Collection	Change in revenue	Difference in %
2010–2011	Rs. 88,68,063	NA	NA
2011–2012	Rs. 99,96,975	Rs. 11,28,912	▲12.73%
2012–2013	Rs. 1,40,68,292	Rs. 40,71,317	▲40.70%
2013–2014	Rs. 1,87,22,851	Rs. 46,54,559	▲33.08%
2014–2015	Rs. 1,41,27,000	NA	NA
2015–2016	Rs. 1,49,83,957	NA	▲5.72%
2016–2017	Rs. 1,47,90,285	NA	▼ -1.29%
2017–2018	Rs. 1,47,35,937	Rs. 54,348	▼ -0.36%
2018–2019	Rs. 1,47,75,303	Rs. 39,366	▲0.26%
2019–2020	Rs. 1,51,77,306	Rs. 4,02,003	▲2.72%
2020–2021	Rs. 22,76,779	Rs. 1,29,00,527	▼ -84.99%
2021–2022	Rs. 84,27,747	Rs. 61,50,968	▲72.98%
2022–2023	Rs. 1,70,45,337	Rs. 86,17,590	▲50.56%
2023–2024	Rs. 2,12,46,999	Rs. 42,01,662	▲24.64%
2024–2025	NA	NA	NA
2025–2026	Rs. 2,77,24,219	NA	▲

Annual originating passengers
Year	Ridership
2016-17	1,147,853
2017-18	1,073,732(-6.45%)
2018-19	1,007,717(-6.14%)
2019-20	960,906(-4.64%)
2020-21	25,041(-97.39%)
2021-22	252,612(+908.79%)
2022-23	867,926(+243.58%)
2023-24	1,109,098(+27.78%)
2025-26	1,995,549

During 2012–2013, Southern Railway has given halt for 3 pairs of trains at Paravur railway station. That helped to give a 40% increase in revenue of the station.

== Service ==
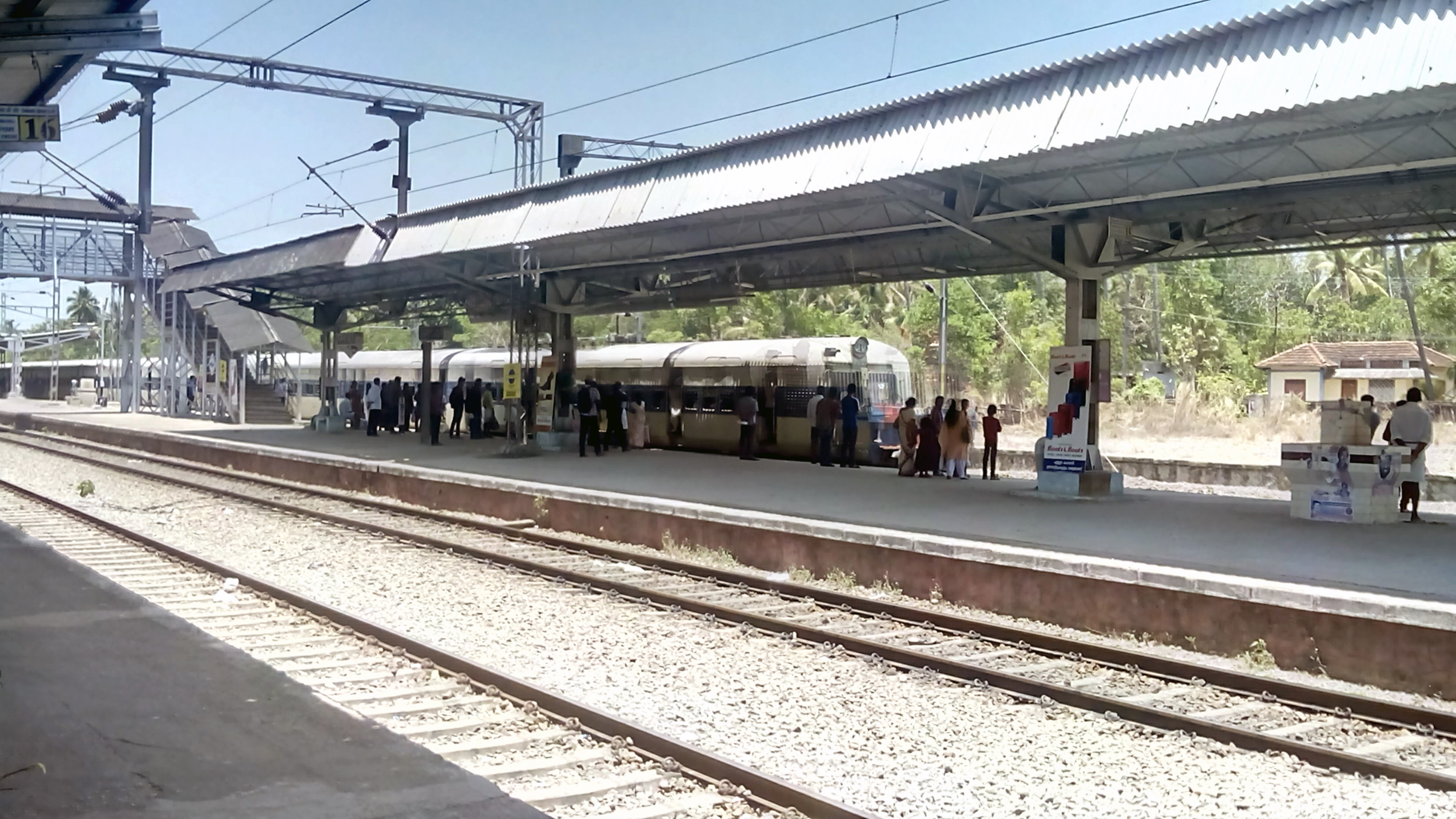
Kollam–Kanyakumari MEMU arriving at Paravur railway station

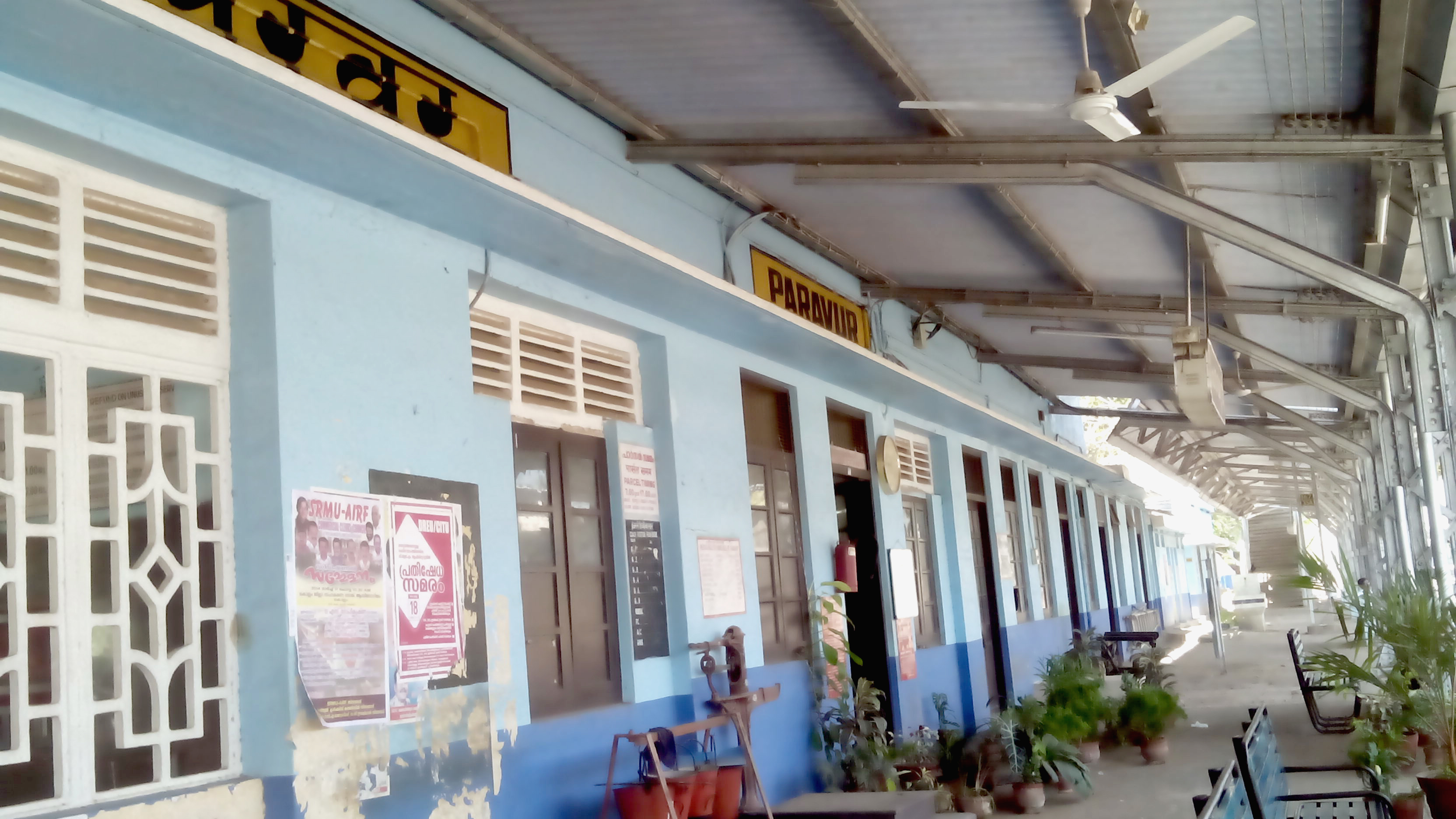
Railway station building, Paravur

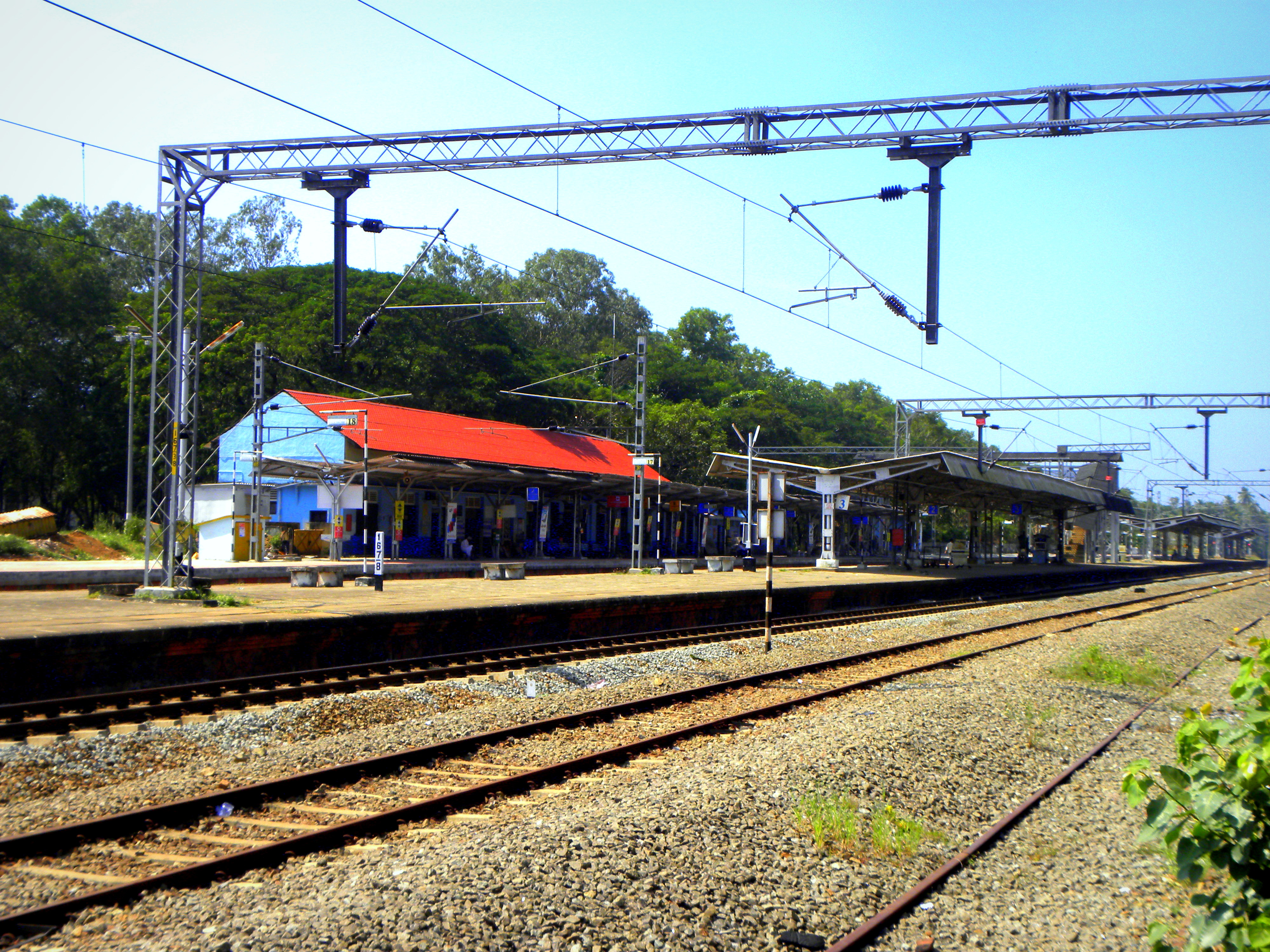
A view of Paravur railway station from the north side

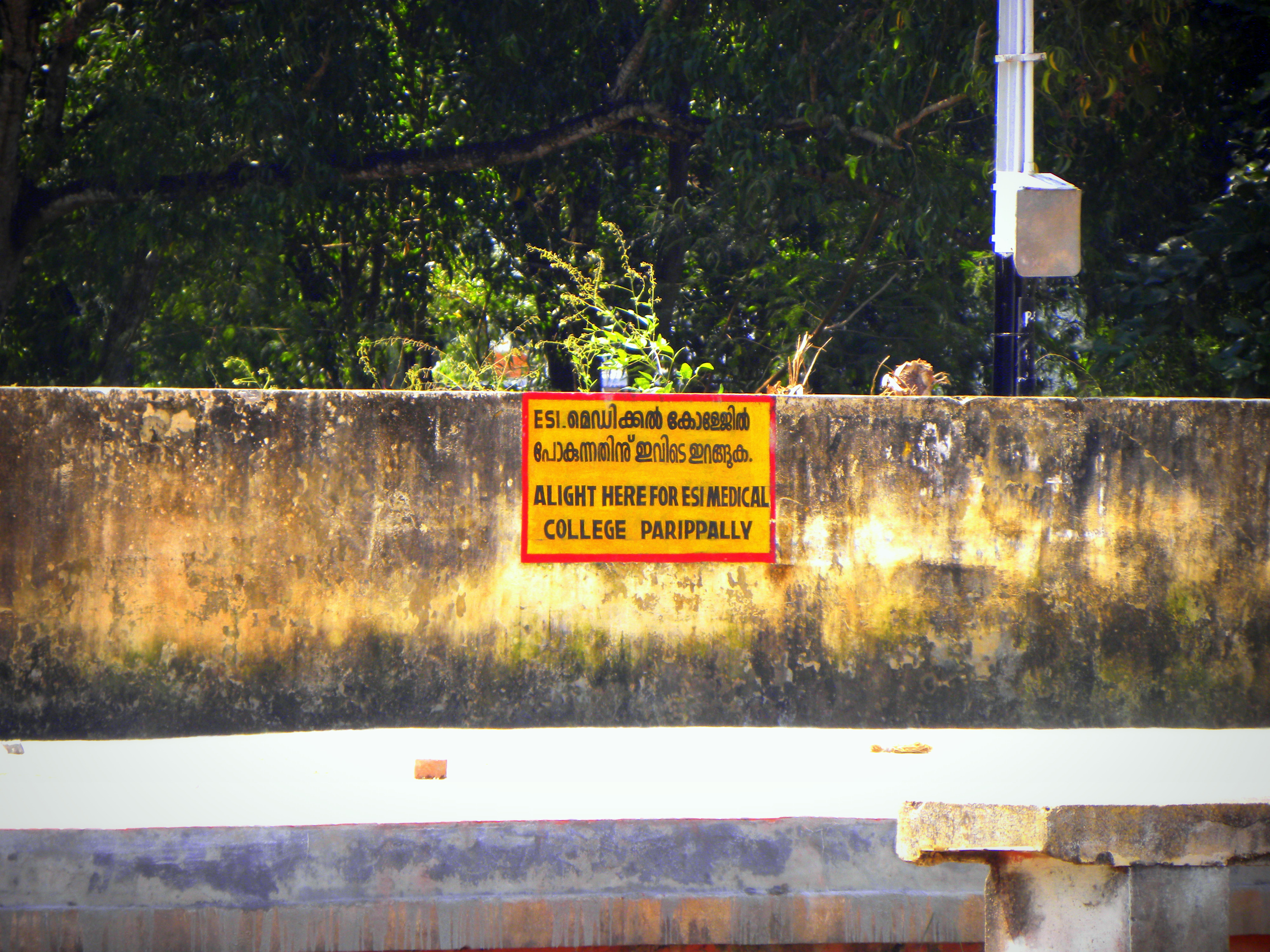
ESIC Medical College's official stoppage notification on the wall of Paravur railway station. The hospital is about 8 km away from Paravur railway station

Express Trains

Some of the major trains having halt at the station.

Train no	Origin	Destination	Train name
20635/20636	Chennai Egmore	Kollam Junction	Anantapuri Superfast Express
16603/16604	Thiruvananthapuram Central	Mangalore Central	Maveli Express
16127/16128	Chennai Egmore	Guruvayur	Chennai Egmore–Guruvayur Express
16341/16342	Thiruvananthapuram Central	Guruvayur	Guruvayur–Thiruvananthapuram Intercity Express
16649/16650	Kanyakumari	Mangalore Central	Parasuram Express
16381/16382	Pune Junction	Kanyakumari	Kanyakumari–Mumbai Express
16525/16526	Bangalore City	Kanyakumari	Island Express
16347/16348	Thiruvananthapuram Central	Mangalore Central	Thiruvananthapuram Central–Mangalore Central Express
16303/16304	Thiruvananthapuram Central	Ernakulam Junction	Vanchinad Express
16301/16302	Thiruvananthapuram Central	Shoranur Junction	Venad Express
16629/16630	Thiruvananthapuram Central	Mangalore Central	Malabar Express
16729/16730	Madurai Junction	Punalur	Madurai-Punalur Express
16366	Nagercoil Junction	Kottayam	Nagercoil-Kottayam Express

Passenger trains

Train number	Source	Destination	Name/Type
56303	Kollam Junction	Thiruvananthapuram Central	Passenger
56705	Punalur	Kanyakumari	Passenger
56102	Nagercoil Junction	Kollam Junction	Passenger
66306	Kollam Junction	Kanyakumari	MEMU
56101	Kollam Junction	Nagercoil Junction	Passenger
56307	Kollam Junction	Thiruvananthapuram Central	Passenger
56706	Kanyakumari	Punalur	Passenger
56304	Thiruvananthapuram Central	Kollam Junction	Passenger
66305	Kanyakumari	Kollam Junction	MEMU

Paravur railway station is an 'Adarsh Railway Station'. However, stoppage of Ernad Express, Netravati Express, Amritha Express trains have been a long-standing demand of Paravur people. Two more Kollam–Kanyakumari MEMU services and a Punalur–Kanyakumari Passenger are expected to start service soon with halts at Paravur.

== See also ==
- Paravur
- Kollam Junction
- Thiruvananthapuram railway division
