= Puducherry–Mangaluru Central Weekly Express =

Train in India

Puducherry–Mangalore Express
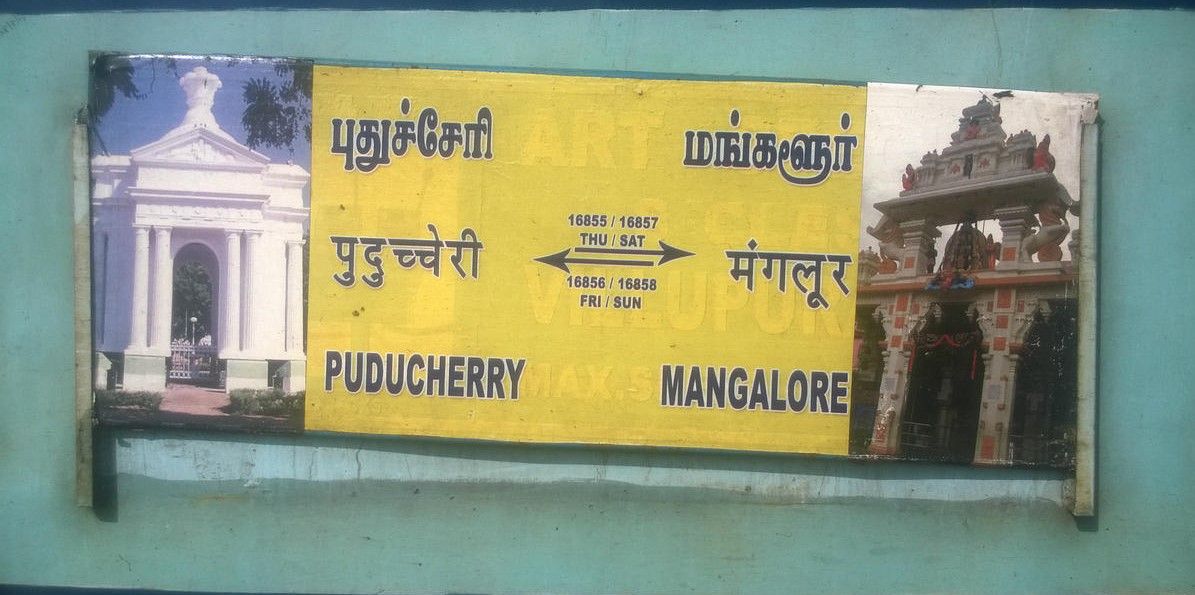

Overview
- Service type: Express
- Current operator: Southern Railway zone

Route
- Termini: Puducherry (PDY); Mangalore Central (MAQ)
- Stops: 21
- Distance travelled: 798 km (496 mi)
- Average journey time: 16h 55m
- Service frequency: Weekly (Note: Runs one day in a week for every direction.)
- Train number: 16855/16856

On-board services
- Classes: AC 2 tier, AC 3 tier, Sleeper class, General Unreserved
- Seating arrangements: No
- Sleeping arrangements: Yes
- Catering facilities: On-board catering E-catering
- Observation facilities: ICF coach
- Entertainment facilities: No
- Baggage facilities: No
- Other facilities: Below the seats

Technical
- Rolling stock: 2
- Track gauge: 1,676 mm (5 ft 6 in)
- Operating speed: 47 km/h (29 mph), including halts

The Puducherry–Mangaluru Central Weekly Express is an Express train belonging to Southern Railway zone that runs between Puducherry and Mangalore Central in India. It is currently being operated with 16855/16856 train numbers on a weekly basis.

== Service ==
The 16855/Puducherry–Mangaluru Central Weekly Express has an average speed of 47 km/h and covers 798 km in 16h 55m. The 16856/Mangaluru Central–Puducherry Weekly Express has an average speed of 47 km/h and covers 798 km in 16h 55m.

== Halts and schedule ==
The train 16855 leaves Puducherry (Pondicherry – PDY ) at 16:35 on Thursday and reaches Mangalore at 10:00 on Friday. It returns as 16856 which leaves Mangaluru (Mangalore Central) at 17:05 on Friday and reaches Puducherry (Pondicherry) at 10:00 on Saturday.

=== 16856 MAQ–PDY WEEKLY EXP. (FRIDAY) ===
Station name	Station code	Arrival	Departure	Day
Mangalore Central	MAQ	-	17:05	1
Kasaragod	KGQ	17:43	17:45	1
Kanhangad	KZE	18:08	18:10	1
Payyanur	PAY	18:33	18:35	1
Kannur	CAN	19:07	19:10	1
Thalassery	TLY	19:28	19:30	1
Mahe	MAHE	19:39	19:40	1
Vadakara	BDJ	19:53	19:55	1
Kozhikode	CLT	20:27	20:30	1
Tirur	TIR	21:03	21:05	1
Shoranur Junction	SRR	22:05	22:15	1
Palakkad Junction	PGT	22:57	23:00	1
Podanur Junction	PTJ	00:14	00:15	2
Coimbatore Junction	CBE	00:25	00:30	2
Tiruppur	TUP	01:03	01:05	2
Erode Junction	ED	01:55	02:00	2
Salem Junction	SA	03:50	04:00	2
Salem Town	SXT	04:19	04:20	2
Attur	ATU	05:09	05:10	2
Chinnasalem	CHSM	05:34	05:35	2
Vridhachalam Junction	VRI	07:40	07:50	2
Viluppuram Junction	VM	08:40	08:50	2
Pondicherry	PDY	10:00	-	2

=== 16855 PDY–MAQ WEEKLY EXP. (THURSDAY) ===
Station name	Station code	Arrival	Departure	Day
Pondicherry	PDY	-	16:35	1
Viluppuram Junction	VM	17:20	17:30	1
Vridhachalam Junction	VRI	18:40	18:50	1
Chinnasalem	CHSM	19:44	19:45	1
Attur	ATU	20:09	20:10	1
Salem Town	SXT	20:59	21:00	1
Salem Junction	SA	22:00	22:10	1
Erode Junction	ED	23:15	23:20	1
Tiruppur	TUP	00:03	00:05	2
Coimbatore Junction	CBE	01:12	01:15	2
Podanur Junction	PTJ	01:24	01:25	2
Palakkad Junction	PGT	02:27	02:30	2
Shoranur Junction	SRR	03:20	03:30	2
Tirur	TIR	04:18	04:20	2
Kozhikode	CLT	05:02	05:05	2
Vadakara	BDJ	05:43	05:45	2
Mahe	MAHE	05:53	05:55	2
Thalassery	TLY	06:08	06:10	2
Kannur	CAN	06:37	06:40	2
Payyanur	PAY	07:13	07:15	2
Kanhangad	KZE	07:48	07:50	2
Kasaragod	KGQ	08:13	08:15	2
Mangalore Central	MAQ	10:00	-	2

== Coach composition ==
The train has standard LHB rakes with a maximum speed of 130 km/h. The train consists of 20 coaches:

- 2 AC II Tier
- 3 AC III Tier
- 8 Sleeper coaches
- 6 General Unreserved
- 2 Seating cum Luggage Rake

== Traction ==
Both trains are hauled by an Electric Loco Shed Erode or ROYAPURAM or Lalaguda Electric Shed-based Wap 7 locomotive from Puducherry to Mangalore Central and vice versa.

== Rake sharing ==
Train number	Train	Class	Source	Destination	Via
16855	Mangaluru Weekly Express	Express	Pondicherry (PDY)	Mangalore Cntl. (MAQ)	Salem
16856	Puducherry Weekly Express	Express	Mangalore Cntl. (MAQ)	Pondicherry (PDY)	Salem
16857	Mangaluru Express	Express	Pondicherry (PDY)	Mangalore Cntl. (MAQ)	Thiruchirapalli
16858	Puducherry Express	Express	Mangalore Cntl. (MAQ)	Pondicherry (PDY)	Thiruchirapalli
22604	Viluppuram–Kharagpur Express	Superfast	Viluppuram Junction (VM)	Kharagpur Junction (KGP)	-
22603	Kharagpur–Viluppuram Express	Superfast	Kharagpur Junction (KGP)	Viluppuram Junction (VM)	-
22605	Purulia–Viluppuram Express	Superfast	Purulia Junction (PRR)	Viluppuram Junction (VM)	-
22606	Viluppuram–Purulia Express	Superfast	Viluppuram Junction (VM)	Purulia Junction (PRR)	-

22604–22603–22606–22605 – Empty to PDY – 16855–16856–16857–16858 – Empty to VM and repeat. PM @VM and SM @ MAQ. Total 2 standard blue ICF rakes

== Direction reversal ==
The train reverses its direction once:

- Salem Junction
- Vriddhachalam Junction
- Viluppuram Junction

== See also ==
- Puducherry railway station
- Mangaluru Central railway station
- Puducherry–Mangalore Central Express (via Tiruchirappalli)
- Tirur railway station
