= Vanchinad Express =

Intercity train in India

Overview
- First service: 1985; 40 years ago
- Current operator(s): Indian Railways

Route
- Termini: Ernakulam Junction; Thiruvananthapuram Central
- Stops: 17
- Distance travelled: 220 km (140 mi)
- Average journey time: 4 hours 45 minutes
- Service frequency: Daily
- Train number(s): 16303 / 16304

On-board services
- Class(es): AC chair car, second sitting
- Seating arrangements: Yes
- Observation facilities: Large windows

Technical
- Rolling stock: ICF Rake
- Track gauge: 1,676 mm (5 ft 6 in)
Route map
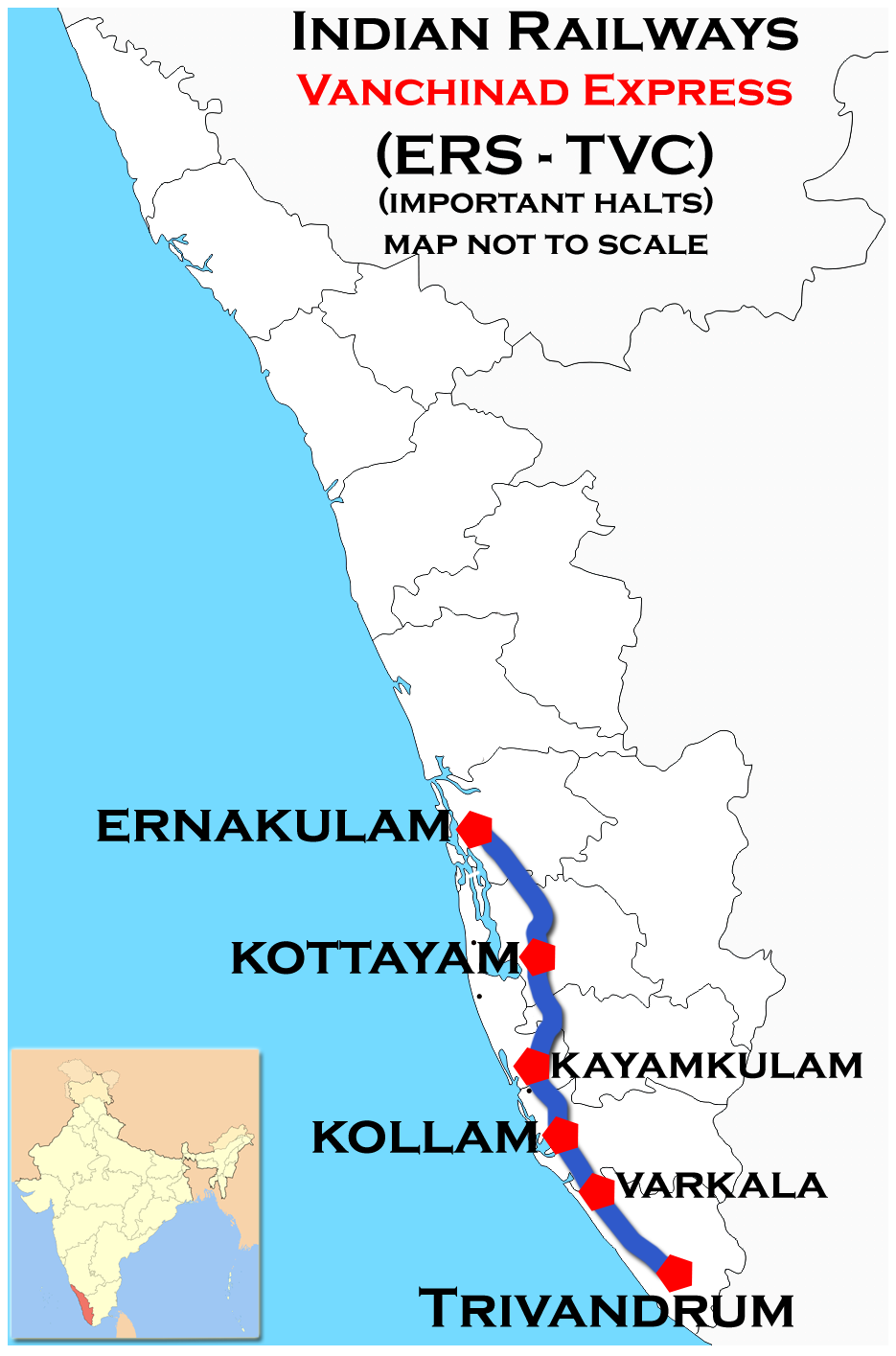

Vanchinad Express is an intercity express train running between Thiruvananthapuram and Ernakulam in the state of Kerala, India. It is operated by the Thiruvananthapuram division of the Southern Railway zone of the Indian Railways.

== Etymology ==
Vanchinad was one of the names of the old princely state of Travancore, which actually had the shape of a ship. The train runs along most of what was once Travancore, and hence the train has been given this name.

== History and relevance ==
The train was introduced in 1985 between Thiruvananthapuram Central and Ernakulam Junction. During initial period the train had only 2 stops at Kottayam and Kollam railway stations and was one of the fastest trains running in Kerala. At that time Vanchinad Express started from Ernakulam Jn at 0600 and arrived Trivandrum Central at 0950 am. On the return run, it started at 1710 from Trivandrum Central and arrived Ernakulam Junction at 2100. The train was given a lot of additional stoppages starting in the mid-1990s due to political pressure from MLAs and MPs which resulted in increased running time of the train and revised schedule. Today, Vanchinad Express has 17 stops between Trivandrum Central and Ernakulam Junction.

== Coach composition ==
When the train was introduced in 1985 the train had one first class compartment and the rest were second class compartments. Later an additional first class coach was added. Today the first class coaches have been removed and replaced with one AC chair car. Pantry car facility was also available in earlier times which was also withdrawn later. Today the train has 20 coaches depending on the availability of coaches with one reserved AC chair car and one reserved Second Sitting coach, for which tickets can be reserved in advance. Other second sitting coaches can be boarded with unreserved tickets issued from the counter.

== Major halts ==
Chirayinkeezhu → Varkala → Paravur → Kollam Junction → Sasthamkotta → Karunagappally → Kayamkulam Junction → Mavelikara → Chengannur → Tiruvalla → Changanasseri → Kottayam → Tripunithura

== See also ==
- Famous trains
- Kerala Express
- Venad Express
- Guruvayur Express
- Kerala Sampark Kranti Express
- Maveli Express
