= Puducherry–Mangaluru Central Express (via Tiruchirappalli) =

Train in India

Puducherry–Mangalore Central Weekly Express
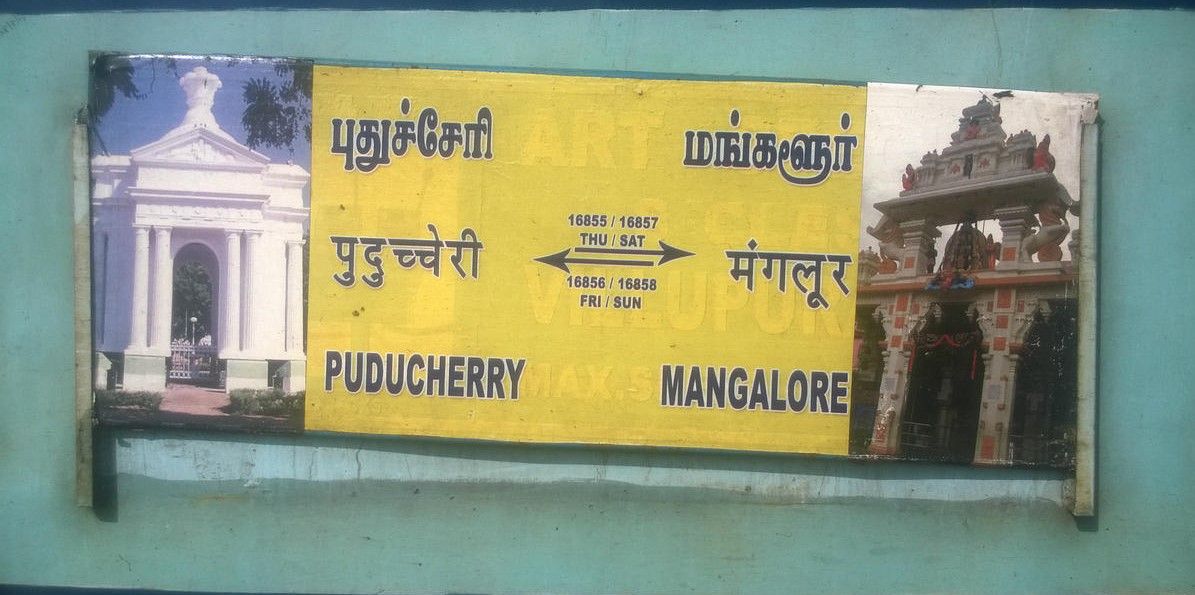
- Puduchery- Mangalore Central Weekly Express (Via Thiruchirapalli Junction, Villupuram Junction)

Overview
- Service type: Express
- Locale: Kerala, Tamilnadu, Pondicherry
- First service: 27 September 2010; 15 years ago
- Current operator: Southern Railway zone

Route
- Termini: Puducherry (PDY); Mangalore Central (MAQ)
- Stops: 21
- Distance travelled: 865 km (537 mi)
- Average journey time: 18h 35m
- Service frequency: Weekly (Note: Runs one day in a week for every direction.)
- Train number: 16857/16858

On-board services
- Classes: AC 2 tier, AC 3 tier, Sleeper class, General Unreserved
- Seating arrangements: No
- Sleeping arrangements: Yes
- Catering facilities: On-board catering E-catering
- Observation facilities: LHB coach
- Entertainment facilities: No
- Baggage facilities: No
- Other facilities: Below the seats

Technical
- Rolling stock: 4
- Track gauge: 1,676 mm (5 ft 6 in)
- Electrification: Yes
- Operating speed: 47 km/h (29 mph), including halts

The Puducherry–Mangalore Central Express is an Express train belonging to Southern Railway zone that runs between Puducherry and Mangalore Central in India. It is currently being operated with 16857/16858 train numbers on a weekly basis.

== Service ==
The 16857/Puducherry–Mangaluru Central Express has an average speed of 47 km/h and covers 865 km in 18h 35m. The 16856/Mangaluru Central–Puducherry Weekly Express has an average speed of 50 km/h and covers 865 km in 17h 10m.

== Halts and schedule ==
The train 16857 leaves Puducherry (Pondicherry – PDY ) at 16:35 on Saturday and reaches Mangaluru (Mangalore Central – MAQ) at 10:10 on Sunday. It returns as 16858 which leaves Mangaluru (Mangalore Central – MAQ) at 17:05 on Sunday and reaches Puducherry (Pondicherry – PDY) at 10:00 on Monday.

=== 16858 MAQ–PDY EXPRESS (SUNDAY) ===
| Station name | Station code | Arrival | Departure | Day |
|---|---|---|---|---|
| Mangalore Cntl | MAQ | - | 17:05 | 1 |
| Kasaragod | KGQ | 17:43 | 17:45 | 1 |
| Kannur | CAN | 19:07 | 19:10 | 1 |
| Thalassery | TLY | 19:28 | 19:30 | 1 |
| Mahe | MAHE | 19:39 | 19:40 | 1 |
| Kozhikode | CLT | 20:27 | 20:30 | 1 |
| Tirur | TIR | 21:03 | 21:05 | 1 |
| Shoranur Jn. | SRR | 22:05 | 22:15 | 1 |
| Palakkad Jn. | PGT | 22:57 | 23:00 | 1 |
| Coimbatore Jn. | CBE | 00:35 | 00:40 | 2 |
| Tiruppur | TUP | 01:23 | 01:25 | 2 |
| Erode Jn. | ED | 02:15 | 02:20 | 2 |
| Karur Jn. | KRR | 03:22 | 03:25 | 2 |
| Tiruchirapalli Jn. | TPJ | 05:15 | 05:25 | 2 |
| Srirangam | SRGM | 05:42 | 05:43 | 2 |
| Ariyalur | ALU | 06:29 | 06:30 | 2 |
| Vridhachalam Jn. | VRI | 07:28 | 07:30 | 2 |
| Viluppuram Jn. | VM | 08:40 | 08:50 | 2 |
| Pondicherry | PDY | 10:00 | - | 2 |

=== 16857 PDY–MAQ EXPRESS (SATURDAY) ===
| Station name | Station code | Arrival | Departure | Day |
|---|---|---|---|---|
| Pondicherry | PDY | - | 16:35 | 1 |
| Viluppuram Jn. | VM | 17:20 | 17:30 | 1 |
| Vridhachalam Jn. | VRI | 18:15 | 18:17 | 1 |
| Ariyalur | ALU | 19:14 | 19:15 | 1 |
| Srirangam | SRGM | 20:00 | 20:02 | 1 |
| Tiruchirapalli Jn. | TPJ | 20:50 | 21:00 | 1 |
| Karur Jn. | KRR | 22:08 | 22:10 | 1 |
| Erode Jn. | ED | 23:45 | 23:50 | 1 |
| Tiruppur | TUP | 00:28 | 00:30 | 2 |
| Coimbatore Jn. | CBE | 01:50 | 01:55 | 2 |
| Palakkad Jn. | PGT | 03:22 | 03:25 | 2 |
| Shoranur Jn. | SRR | 04:20 | 04:25 | 2 |
| Tirur | TIR | 05:03 | 05:05 | 2 |
| Kozhikode | CLT | 05:47 | 05:50 | 2 |
| Mahe | MAHE | 06:34 | 06:35 | 2 |
| Thalassery | TLY | 06:48 | 06:50 | 2 |
| Kannur | CAN | 07:22 | 07:25 | 2 |
| Kasaragod | KGQ | 08:49 | 08:50 | 2 |
| Mangalore Cntl | MAQ | 10:10 | - | 2 |

== Coach composition ==
The train has standard LHB rakes with a maximum speed of 130 km/h. The train consists of 21 coaches:

- Generator car
- 2 AC II Tier
- 3 AC III Tier
- 9 Sleeper coaches
- 4 General Unreserved
- 2 Seating cum Luggage Rake

== Traction ==
Both trains are hauled by an Arakkonam Electric Shed-based WAP-4 Electric locomotive from Puducherry to Mangalore and vice versa.

== Rake sharing ==
| Train number | Train | Class | Source | Destination | Via |
|---|---|---|---|---|---|
| 16855 | Mangaluru Weekly Express | Express | Pondicherry (PDY) | Mangalore Cntl. (MAQ) | Salem |
| 16856 | Puducherry Weekly Express | Express | Mangalore Cntl. (MAQ) | Pondicherry (PDY) | Salem |
| 16857 | Mangaluru Express | Express | Pondicherry (PDY) | Mangalore Cntl. (MAQ) | Thiruchirapalli |
| 16858 | Puducherry Express | Express | Mangalore Cntl. (MAQ) | Pondicherry (PDY) | Thiruchirapalli |
| 22604 | Viluppuram–Kharagpur Express | Superfast | Viluppuram Jn. (VM) | Kharagpur Jn. (KGP) | - |
| 22603 | Kharagpur–Viluppuram Express | Superfast | Kharagpur Jn. (KGP) | Viluppuram Jn. (VM) | - |
| 22605 | Purulia–Viluppuram Express | Superfast | Purulia Jn. (PRR) | Viluppuram Jn. (VM) | - |
| 22606 | Viluppuram–Purulia Express | superfast | Viluppuram Jn. (VM) | Purulia Jn. (PRR) | - |

22604–22603–22606–22605 – Empty to PDY – 16855–16856–16857–16858 – Empty to VM and repeat. PM @VM and SM @ MAQ. Total 2 standard blue ICF rakes

== Direction reversal ==
The train reverses its direction twice:

- Tiruchirappalli Junction
- Viluppuram Junction

== See also ==
- Puducherry railway station
- Mangaluru Central railway station
- Puducherry–Mangalore Central Weekly Express
