= Chennai Central–Mangaluru Central Superfast Express =

Superfast train in India

M.G.R Chennai Central - Mangaluru Central Superfast Express
Overview
- Service type: Superfast Express
- First service: 2006 November 4
- Current operator: Southern Railways

Route
- Termini: MGR Chennai Central; Mangaluru Central
- Stops: 20
- Distance travelled: 889 km (552 mi)
- Average journey time: 15 hours
- Service frequency: Daily
- Train number: 12685 / 12686

On-board services
- Classes: AC 1st Class, AC 2 Tier, AC 3 Tier, AC Three Tier Economy, Sleeper Class, General Unreserved
- Seating arrangements: Yes
- Sleeping arrangements: Yes
- Auto-rack arrangements: Yes
- Catering facilities: On-board Catering; E-Catering
- Baggage facilities: Yes

Technical
- Rolling stock: LHB coach
- Track gauge: 1,676 mm (5 ft 6 in)
- Operating speed: 130 km/h (81 mph) maximum 59 km/h (37 mph), including halts

Train no . 12685 / 12686 Mangaluru Central - M.G.R Chennai Central - Mangaluru Central Superfast Express is a Daily Superfast express train belonging to Southern Railway zone of Indian Railways that run between Chennai Central (MAS) and Mangaluru Central (MAQ) in India. It is the fastest train connecting Chennai and Mangaluru, taking just 15 hours. Mangaluru Chennai Superfast Express gets the highest priority in its route and is the most popular and demanding train on this route because of its timings and punctuality.

Till 25 February 2016, it was running with ICF Coaches after 26 February 2016 its converted into LHB Coaches. It shares its rake with 12671/12672 Nilgiri Superfast Express

== Service ==
The frequency of this train is daily and covers the distance of 889 km with an average speed of 59 km/h with a total time of 15 hours.

== Coach composition ==
This train has total 23 coaches:

- 1 AC First Class cum AC Two Tier,
- 2 AC Two Tier,
- 4 AC Three Tier,
- 2 AC Three Tier Economy,
- 8 Sleeper Class,
- 4 General Unreserved,
- 1 Luggage Cum Disabled Coach,
- 1 End On Generator Coach

The Train have Rake sharing with Chennai Central -Mettuppalayam Nilgiri Superfast Express

== Traction ==
As the route is fully electrified a WAP-4 Arakkonam, WAP-7 of Royapuram or Erode Based pulls the train to its destination on both sides.

== Incident ==
On 26 February 2019, The two coaches of Chennai Mangalore Superfast Express was derailed at around morning at Shoranur Junction there were no casualties reported.

== Corona Virus Special Train ==
During the Corona Virus Pandemic in India, the express train was renamed to MGR Chennai Mangaluru Super Fast COVID-19 Special. It has the same no.of stops and the same amount of distance is covered.
