= Guruvayur–Thiruvananthapuram Intercity Express =

Train in India

Guruvayur - Thiruvananthapuram Intercity Express

Overview
- Service type: Express
- First service: 1 January 1996; 30 years ago
- Current operator: Southern Railway zone

Route
- Termini: Guruvayur; Thiruvananthapuram Central
- Stops: 21
- Distance travelled: 303 km (188 mi)
- Average journey time: 7 hours 05 mins
- Service frequency: Daily
- Train number: 16341 / 16342

On-board services
- Classes: CC, 2S, UR, SLR
- Seating arrangements: Yes
- Sleeping arrangements: Yes
- Catering facilities: No

Technical
- Rolling stock: LHB Coaches
- Track gauge: 1,676 mm (5 ft 6 in)
- Operating speed: 43 km/h (27 mph)
- Rake maintenance: Tiruchirappalli Junction
- Rake sharing: Tiruchirappalli–Thiruvananthapuram Intercity Express

The 16341 / 42 Guruvayur - Thiruvananthapuram Central Intercity Express is an express train belonging to Southern Railway zone that runs between Guruvayur and Thiruvananthapuram Central via Alappuzha in India.

It operates as train number 16341 from Guruvayur to Thiruvananthapuram Central and as train number 16342 in the reverse direction serving the states of Kerala.

== Coaches ==
The 16341 / 42 Guruvayur - Thiruvananthapuram Central Intercity Express has 1 AC Chair Car, 7 Second Sitting, 6 General Unreserved & Two SLR (seating with luggage rake) coaches . It does not carry a pantry car coach.

As is customary with most train services in India, coach composition may be amended at the discretion of Indian Railways depending on demand.

== Service ==
The 16341 Guruvayur - Thiruvananthapuram Central Intercity Express covers the distance of 303 km (188 mi) in 6 hours 30 mins (47 km/h) and in 6 hours 50 mins as the 16342 Thiruvananthapuram Central - Guruvayur Intercity Express (44 km/h).

As the average speed of the train is lower than 55 km/h (34 mph), as per railway rules, its fare doesn't includes a Superfast surcharge.

== Routing ==
The 16341 / 42 Guruvayur - Thiruvananthapuram Central Intercity Express runs from Guruvayur via Thrissur, Ernakulam Junction, Alappuzha, Kollam Junction to Thiruvananthapuram Central.

== Halts ==
Thiruvananthapuram Pettah(for 16341 only) → Varkala Sivagiri → Paravur → Mayyanad → Kollam Junction → Munroturuttu → Karunagappalli → Kayamkulam Junction → Haripad → Ambalappuzha→ Alappuzha → Mararikulam → Cherthala → Turavur → Ernakulam Junction → Aluva → Angamaly → Chalakudy → Irinjalakuda → Thrissur→ Punkunnam

== Traction ==
As the route is going to electrification, an Erode based WDM-3D diesel locomotive pulls the train to its destination.
