= Paravur Municipal Bus Stand =

Bus stand in Paravur, Kerala, India

Paravur Municipal Bus Stand പരവൂര്‍ മുനിസിപ്പല്‍ ബസ്സ്‌ സ്റ്റാന്‍ഡ്
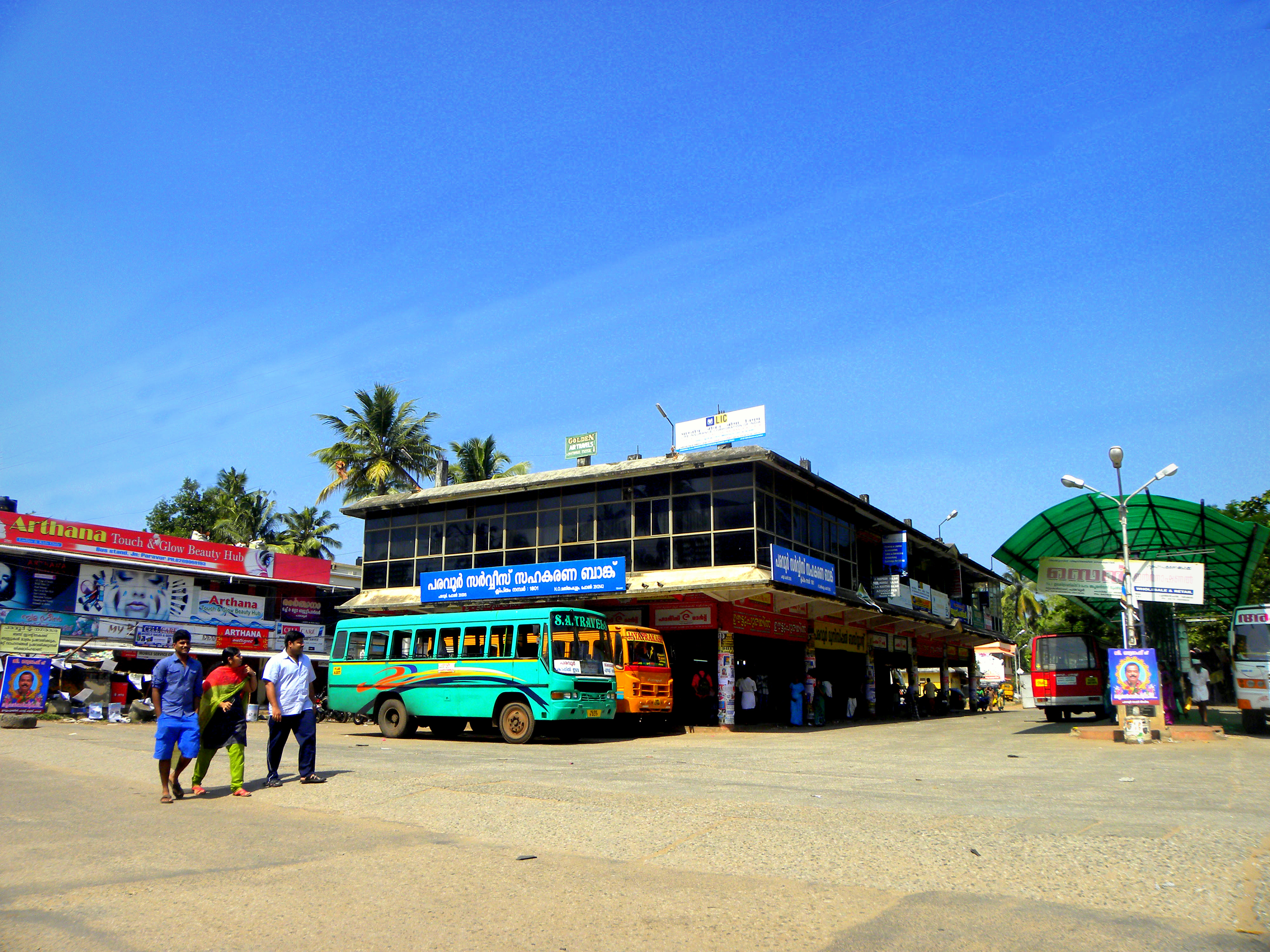
- Paravur Municipal Bus Stand

General information
- Location: Pozhikara road, Paravur, Kollam; India
- Coordinates: 8°48′40.37″N 76°40′7.01″E
- Owner: Paravur Municipality
- Operator: Paravur Municipality

Construction
- Structure type: At Grade
- Parking: No
Location

Paravur Municipal Bus Stand or Paravur Private Bus Stand is the one and only bus stand in Paravur municipal town of Kollam district, Kerala. The bus stand construction project was implemented by the Municipal council of Paravur before some years.

== Location ==
- Paravur railway station - 800 m
- Paravur Puttingal Temple - 650 m
- Paravur Pozhikara - 3.4 km
- Paravur Estuaries - 3.5 km
- ESIC Medical College - 9.6 km
- Kollam - 20.2 km
- Kollam Sea Port - 22.8 km
- Trivandrum International Airport - 54.3 km

== Significance ==
As Paravur Municipal Bus Stand is the only bus stand in the town, the heavy population of this municipal town and suburbs are totally depending on this bus stand for their daily journeys. Apart from that, this is the nearest bus station of Government Medical College, Kollam in Parippally, which is 9.6 km away. Paravur railway station, one amongst the busiest and top revenue generating stations in the Kollam-Thiruvananthapuram stretch is situated close to this bus stand. People going to Kollam LPG filling station (Ezhippuram), world-famous Polachira wetland visitors etc. are depending on this bus stand. Paravur Puttingal Temple, famous for its annual fireworks competition as part of the temple festival, is also close to this bus stand. Considering the importance of this bus stand as a significant transport hub in Kerala, BSNL has provided a high-speed Wi-Fi Hotspot in Paravur Municipal Bus Stand.

Paravur is a coastal-backwater stretch in Kerala state. Estuaries in Paravur attract visitors and foreign tourists.
