= Maveli Express =

Train in India

Overview
- Service type: Express
- Status: Daily Service
- First service: November 16, 2001; 24 years ago
- Current operator: South Western Railways

Route
- Termini: Thiruvananthapuram Central; Managaluru Central
- Stops: 29
- Distance travelled: 620 km (390 mi)
- Average journey time: 12 hours 20 minutes
- Service frequency: Daily
- Train number: 16603 / 16604

On-board services
- Classes: 2 Tier AC ,3 Tier AC, Sleeper Class, General
- Seating arrangements: Yes
- Sleeping arrangements: Yes
- Observation facilities: Large windows

Technical
- Rolling stock: 7
- Track gauge: 1,676 mm (5 ft 6 in)
- Electrification: Fully Electrified
- Operating speed: 50.09 kmph

Best Train To Travel From Mangaluru Central to Thiruvananthapuram Central . The 16603 / 16604 Maveli Express is a Daily Express train of the South Western Railway Zone of Indian Railways connecting Managaluru Central In Karnataka to Thiruvananthapuram Central In Kerala. It is the Best Train to Travel From Mangaluru Central to Thiruvananthapuram Central and Thiruvananthapuram Central to Mangaluru Central On Daily Basis.

The train once had 3 ISO certifications (Quality Management System, Environmental Management System, and Occupational Health and Safety Management System - in 2022) for maintenance.

== About the train ==
This train is named after Maveli, a king in Hindu mythology. It runs via the coastal railway route of Alleppey.

== Traction ==
Maveli Express is hauled by an Erode based WAP-4 or Royapuram based WAP-7 electric locomotive.

== Coach composition ==
It has 24 coaches: 9 Sleeper Class, 5 3 tier AC, 2 2 - tier AC, 1 AC First Class - Cum - 2-tier, 6 Second class General, and 2 brake van-cum-second sitter.

== Stops ==
- Mangalore Central
- Kasaragod
- Kanhangad
- Nileshwar
- Cheruvathur
- Payyanur
- Payangadi
- Kannur
- Thalassery
- Mahe
- Vadakara
- Quilandi
- Kozhikkode
- Ferok
- Tirur
- Kuttippuram
- Shoranur Junction
- Thrissur
- Aluva
- Ernakulam Junction
- Cherthala
- Alappuzha
- Ambalapuzha
- Haripad
- Kayamkulam Junction
- Karunagapally
- Kollam Junction
- Paravur
- Varkala Sivagiri
- Thiruvananthapuram Central
