= Venad Express =

Train in India

Overview
- Service type: Express
- First service: 1972; 54 years ago
- Current operator: Southern Railway

Route
- Termini: Shoranur Junction (SRR); Thiruvananthapuram Central (TVC)
- Stops: 26
- Distance travelled: 327 km (203 mi)
- Average journey time: 7 hours 25 minutes
- Service frequency: Daily
- Train number: 16301 / 16302

On-board services
- Classes: AC Chair Car, Second Class Seating, General Unreserved
- Seating arrangements: Yes
- Sleeping arrangements: No
- Auto-rack arrangements: Overhead racks
- Catering facilities: Available
- Observation facilities: Large windows
- Baggage facilities: No
- Other facilities: Below the seats

Technical
- Rolling stock: LHB coach
- Track gauge: 1,676 mm (5 ft 6 in)
- Operating speed: 44 km/h (27 mph) average including halts.
Route map
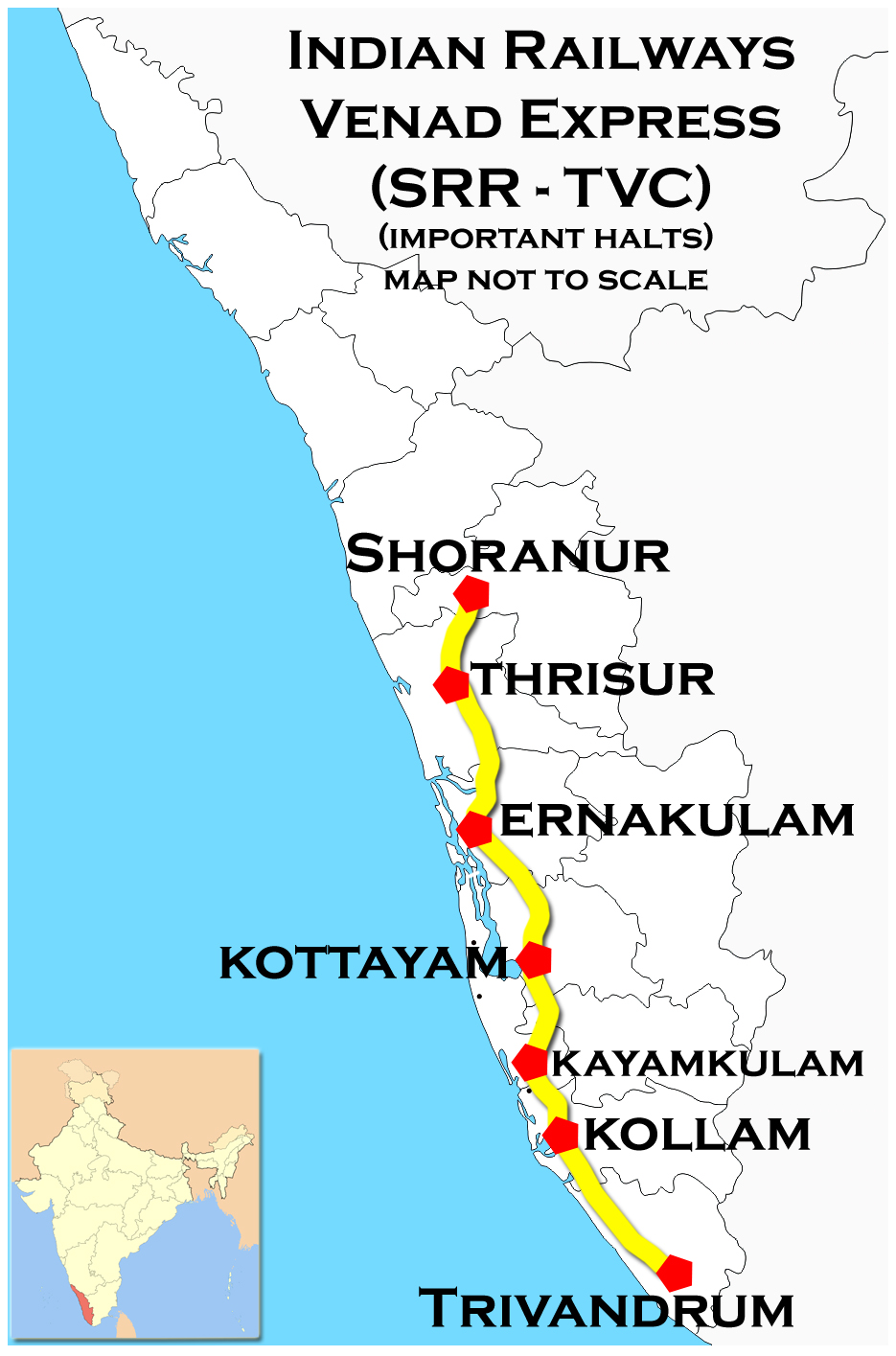

The 16301 / 16302 Venad Express is an express train connecting the Shoranur Junction and Trivandrum Central via Kottayam. The daily train's numbers are 16301 (from Shoranur Junction to Trivandrum Central) and 16302 (from Trivandrum Central to Shoranur Junction).

== History ==
The Venad Express is one of the oldest daily intercity trains in Kerala, and one of the most popular trains between Trivandrum (the state capital) and Ernakulam (Kochi). The Express was introduced in 1972 by Southern Railways. It travelled the 1,000 mm (3 ft 3 3/8 in) metre gauge track between Trivandrum Central and Ernakulam. At that time, diesel engines were used to power the train, which initially had a green livery. In 1976, Indian Railways converted the tracks to broad gauge.

In the 1980s, Indian Railways introduced double-decker coaches for the train. The company later withdrew the double-decker compartments due to operational issues. The Venad Express was the fastest train of that time. Before its route extension, the train left Trivandrum Central at 06:00 and reached Ernakulam Junction at 09:00. On the return trip, it left Ernakulam Junction/Cochin Harbour Terminus at 05:15 and reached Trivandrum Central by 09:30. Its rake was changed twice, first with a unique grey livery CBC rake which no other train in SR possessed. It was withdrawn from service after Venad got blue LHB coach. The train used to have a locomotive reversal at Ernakulam Junction railway station.

Currently, the railways removed the stop at Ernakulam Junction. Instead, a longer halt was provided at Ernakulam Town. In 2025, following the electrification of the Nilambur-Shoranur Branch line, a proposal has been mooted to extend the train to Nilambur Road railway station. The railways is looking for ways to accommodate the 24-coach train at the 14 coach platform.

The train used to be hauled with WDM-3 or WDP-4 diesel locomotives from Ernakulam locomotive shed. The diesel link was removed and it now runs with a WAP 7 or WAP-4 from Royapuram/Erode Shed.

== Name ==
The name Venad comes from the dynasty of Venad Swarupam, which ruled over Quilon (Kollam). The Trivandrum Division of Southern Railway Zone set a precedent on International Women's Day, March 8, 2020, when it ran the Venad Express with an all-female crew from Ernakulam Junction to Shoranur Junction. This was the first time in Kerala's history that an express train was operated by an all-female crew.

== Frequency ==
This Venad Express runs daily. Train number 16301 departs Shoranur Junction at 14:35 and reaches Trivandrum Central at 22:00. Train number 16302 departs from Trivandrum Central at 05:20 and reaches Shoranur Junction at 12:35. It covers a distance of 327 kilometers (203 mi.) in each direction, and takes 7 hours and 25 minutes in SRR TVC direction (16301) and 7hrs and 15 minutes in TVC SRR direction (16302).

The Venad Express links major commercial hubs within Kerala, including Thrissur, Aluva, Ernakulam, Kottayam, Tiruvalla(Thiruvalla), Chengannur, Kayamkulam, Kollam, Varkala, and Kochuveli with Trivandrum.

== Coach composition ==
The train's rake contains 16 unreserved coaches, 2 reserved coaches, an AC chair car coach, a pantry car and 2 EOG (End on Generation) coach cars for a total of 22 coaches. The train was allotted LHB coach starting in November 2019.

Advance reservation is available only in three compartments. Seats can be reserved through the IRCTC website or from the railway station. Other coaches can be boarded with an unreserved ticket.

=== Rake/Coach composition ===
LOCO	EOG	UR	UR	UR	UR	UR	UR	UR	UR	UR	UR	UR	UR	D2	D1	C1	PC	UR	UR	UR	UR	EOG

EOG – End on Generator

UR – Unreserved

D – Second Sitting

C – AC Chair Car

PC – Pantry Car

== Traction ==
it regularly hauled by electrified locomotive WAP-4 or WAP-7 throughout the journey (end to end)

== See also ==
- Palaruvi Express
- Rail transport in India
- Vanchinad Express
