= Thiruvananthapuram Central–Mangaluru Central Express =

Thiruvananthapuram Central - Mangaluru Central Express
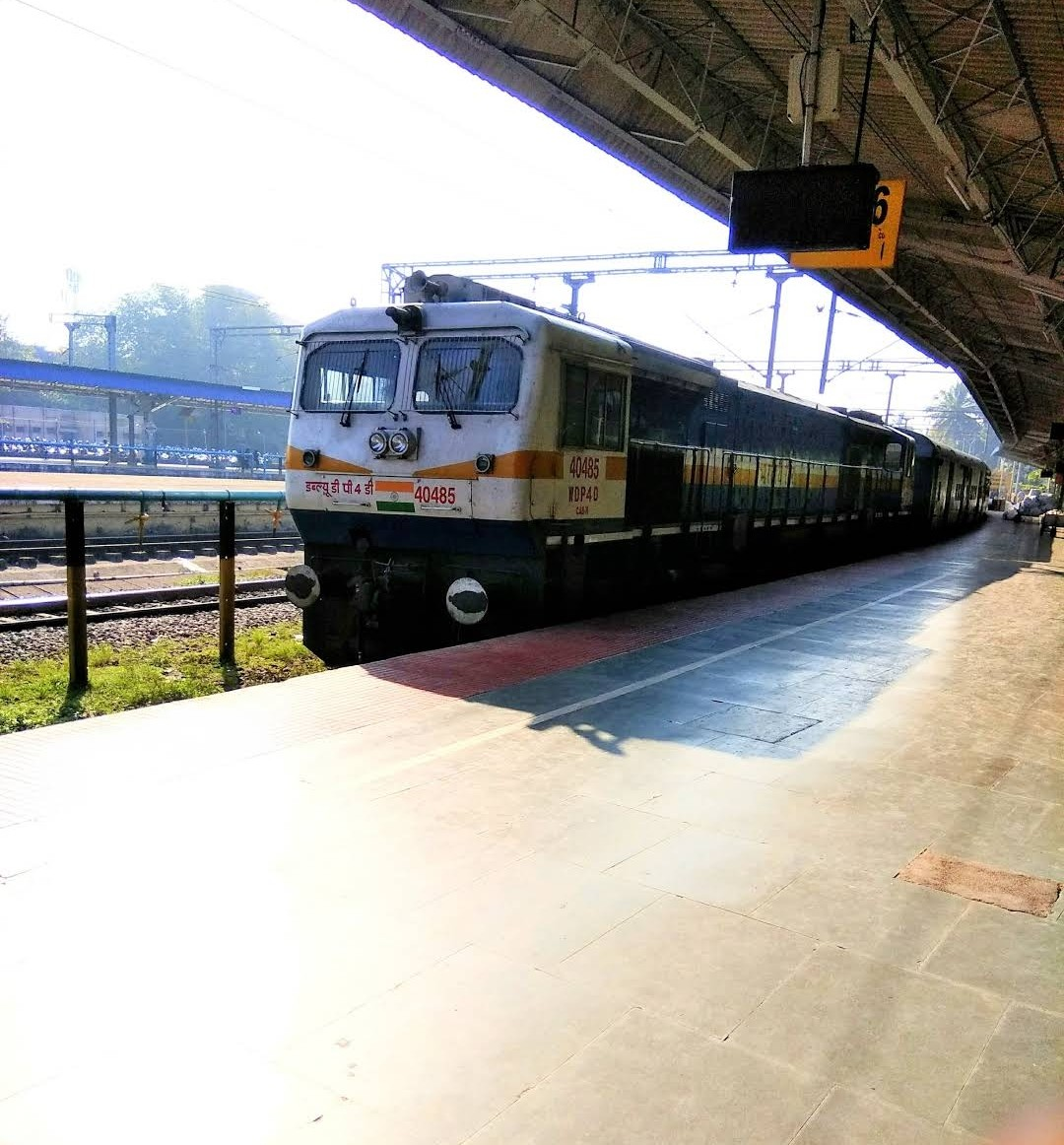
- 16347 arrives at Kozhikode Station.

Overview
- Service type: Express
- Current operator: Southern Railway zone

Route
- Termini: Thiruvananthapuram Central (TVC); Mangaluru Central (MAQ)
- Stops: 48
- Distance travelled: 632 km (393 mi)
- Service frequency: Daily (Note: Runs seven days in a week for every direction.)
- Train number: 16347/16348

On-board services
- Classes: AC 2 tier, AC 3 tier, AC 3 tier economy, Sleeper class, General Unreserved
- Seating arrangements: No
- Sleeping arrangements: Yes
- Catering facilities: On-board catering E-catering
- Observation facilities: LHB coach
- Entertainment facilities: No
- Baggage facilities: No

Technical
- Rolling stock: 2
- Track gauge: 1,676 mm (5 ft 6 in)
- Operating speed: 44 km/h (27 mph), including halts

The 16347 / 16348 Thiruvananthapuram Central– Mangaluru Central - Thiruvananthapuram Central Express is an Express train belonging to Southern Railway zone that runs between Thiruvananthapuram Central and Mangaluru Central in India. It is currently being operated with 16347/16348 train numbers on a daily basis. It first began operations as Ernakulam/CHTS Kannur express and then was extended to Trivandrum on the Southside and ran as Trivandrum Kannur Express. This train was then again extended to Mangaluru Central to provide connectivity to the people of Kasaragod with the state capital. In the Southern Railway Timetable Conference 2020, it has been decided to extend this train to Nagercoil as People of Nagercoil, Kanyakumari want an Overnight train to Mangaluru and north Kerala.

== Service ==
The 16347/Thiruvananthapuram–Mangaluru Express has an average speed of 44 km/h and covers 632 km in 14h 15m. The 16348/Mangaluru–Thiruvananthapuram Express has an average speed of 44 km/h and covers 632 km in 14h 15m.

== Schedule ==
Train number	Station code	Departure station	Departure time	Departure day	Arrival station	Arrival time	Arrival day
16348	MAQ	Mangalore Central	2:25 PM	Daily	Thiruvananthapuram Central	4:15 AM	Daily (next day)
16347	TVC	Thiruvananthapuram Central	8:55 PM	Daily	Mangalore Central	11:20 AM	Daily (next day)

== Route and halts ==
The important halts of the train are:

- Thiruvananthapuram Central
- Kollam Junction
- Kayamkulam Junction
- Tiruvalla
- Kottayam
- Ernakulam Town
- Aluva
- Thrissur
- Shoranur Junction
- Tirur
- Parappanangadi
- Kozhikode
- Mahe
- Kannur
- Kasaragod
- Mangaluru Central

== Coach composition ==
The train was upgraded to modern LHB rake on February 18, 2025, with an MPS of 145 kmph. The train consists of 24 coaches:

- 1 AC II Tier coach
- 4 AC III Tier coaches
- 2 AC III Tier Economy coaches
- 9 Sleeper coaches
- 4 Sitting coaches
- 2 General coaches
- 1 General coach Divyangjan Friendly
- 1 Generator cars

Loco	1	2	3	4	5	6	7	8	9	10	11	12	13	14	15	16	17	18	19	20	21	22	23	24
	SLR	UR	D1	D2	S1	S2	S3	S4	S5	S6	S7	S8	S9	M2	M1	B4	B3	B2	B1	A1	D3	D4	UR	EOG

- (Coach Position of 16348 Mangalore Trivandrum Express)
- Rake Sharing 12619/12620 Mumbai Lokmanya Tilak (T) - Mangalore Central - Mumbai Lokmanya Tilak (T) Matsyagandha Express

== Traction ==
The route is fully electrified, and both trains are hauled by an Erode/Royapuram-based WAP-4/WAP-7 loco.

== Rake sharing ==
The train shares its rake with 12619/12620 Matsyagandha Express.

== See also ==
- Thiruvananthapuram Central railway station
- Mangalore Central railway station
- Thiruvananthapuram–Mangalore high-speed passenger corridor
