= Parasuram Express =

Train in India

Overview
- Service type: Express
- Locale: Karnataka, Kerala & Tamil Nadu
- First service: 1 April 1975; 51 years ago
- Current operator: South Western Railway

Route
- Termini: Mangalore Central (MAQ); Kanniyakumari (CAPE)
- Stops: 51
- Distance travelled: 703 km (437 mi)
- Average journey time: 15 hours 50 minutes
- Service frequency: Daily
- Train number: 16649 / 16650

On-board services
- Classes: AC Chair Car, Second Class Seating, General Unreserved
- Seating arrangements: Yes
- Sleeping arrangements: Yes
- Catering facilities: Available
- Observation facilities: Large windows
- Baggage facilities: Available
- Other facilities: Below the seats

Technical
- Rolling stock: LHB coach
- Track gauge: 1,676 mm (5 ft 6 in)
- Operating speed: 44 km/h (27 mph) average including halts.
Route map
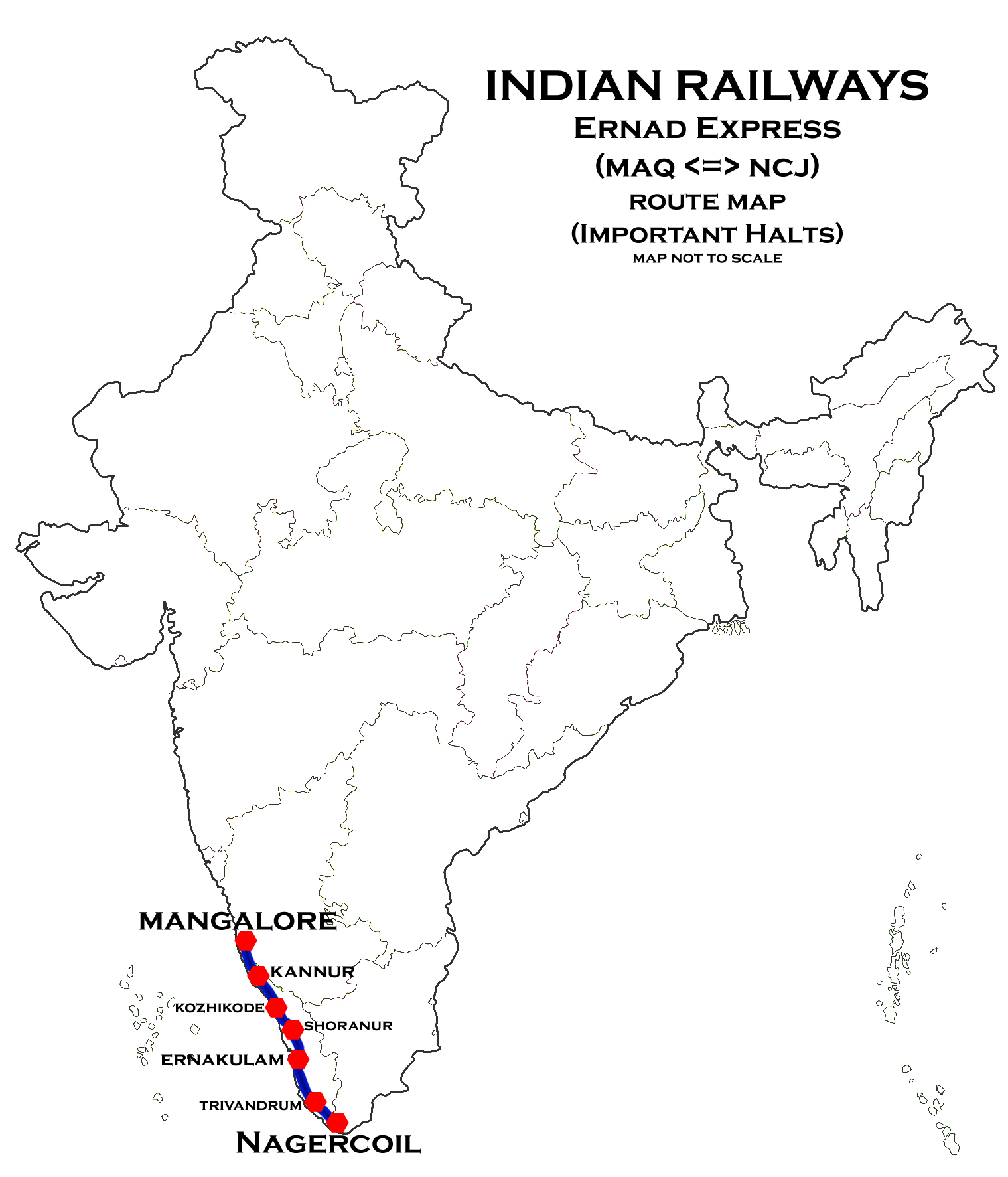

The 16649 / 16650 Parasuram Express is an express train run by Indian Railways connecting Mangalore in Karnataka with Kanniyakumari in Tamil Nadu.

== History ==
The train (Train No: 49/50) was initially run between Cochin and Shoranur. The train was later extended to Trivandrum and Mangalore Central on both sides. In 2012 the train was again extended to Nagercoil and in July of 2024 the Parasuram Express was extended once more to Kanniyakumari.

== Schedule and timing ==
The train no.16650 starts from Kanniyakumari at 03:45 AM and reaches Mangalore Central at 21:00 PM. In the return direction the train no: 16649 leaves Mangalore Central at 05:05 AM and reaches Kanniyakumari at 21:15 PM. The train runs via Shoranur–Kottayam route.

== Traction ==
The train is hauled by an Arakkonam Loco Shed-based WAP-4 electric locomotive on its entire journey.
