= Mangalore Central railway station =

Railway station in Mangalore, India

Mangalore Central Mangaluru Central
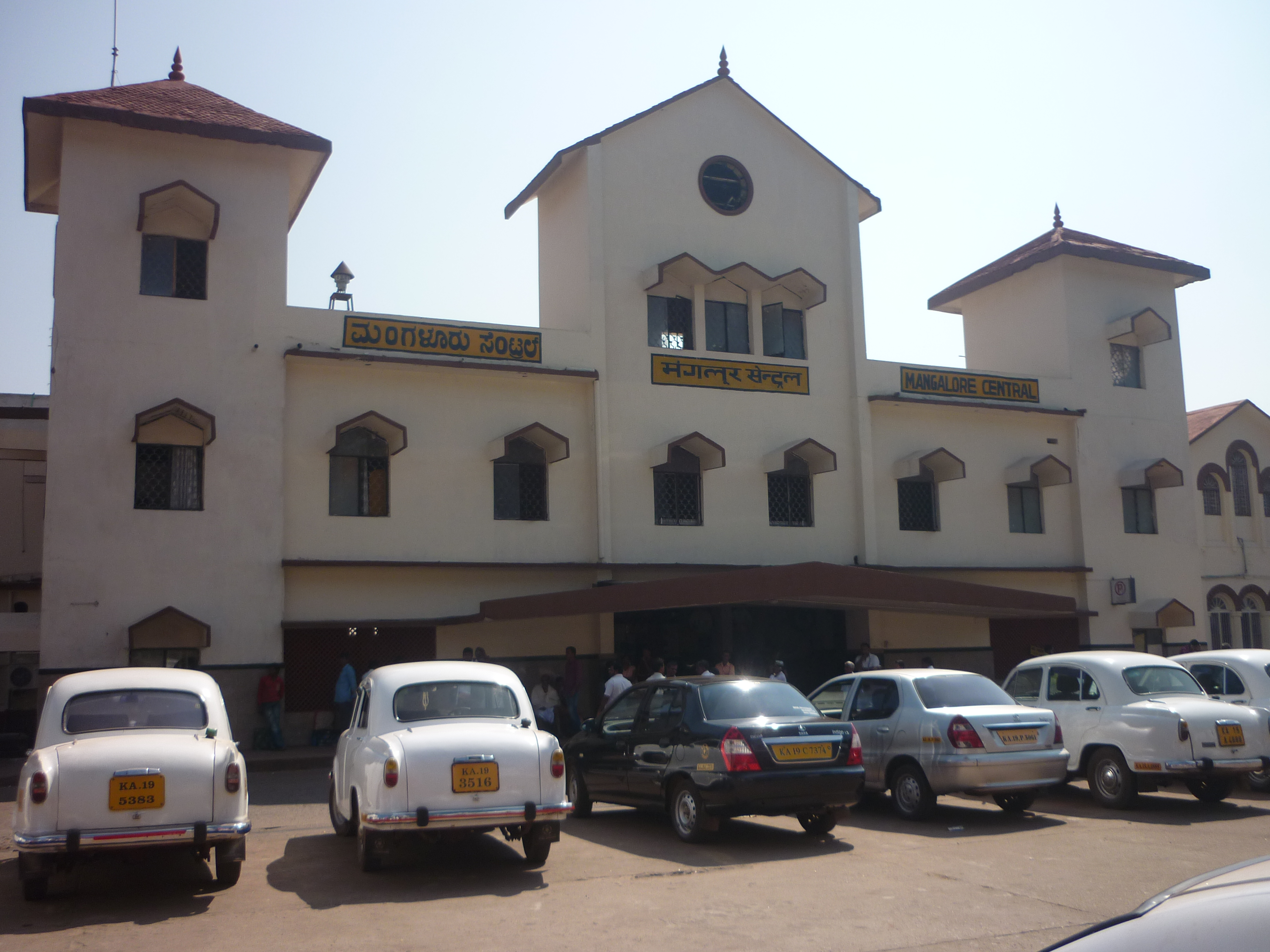
- Manglore Central Railway station

General information
- Other names: Kudla Central
- Location: Old Kent Road, Hampankatta, Mangaluru, Dakshina Kannada, Karnataka; India
- Coordinates: 12.8634°N 74.8433°E
- Elevation: 300 m (980 ft)
- System: Indian Railways station
- Owner: Indian Railways
- Operator: South Western Railway zone
- Line: Shoranur - Manglore -Mumbai CST /LTT
- Platforms: 6 (5 Full Length PFs + 1 Bayline PF)
- Tracks: 15
- Connections: Bus stand, Taxicab stand, Auto rickshaw stand

Construction
- Structure type: Standard (on-ground station)
- Parking: Yes
- Accessible: Disabled access

Other information
- Status: Functioning
- Station code: MAQ
- Zone(s): SWR
- Division(s): Mysore

History
- Opened: 1907; 119 years ago
- Closed: -
- Rebuilt: -
- Former names: Mangalore

Passengers
- 4500: 5,000 ▲100%
Services
| Preceding station | Indian Railways | Following station |
|---|---|---|
| Mangalore Junction towards Thokur | Southern Railway zone Shoranur–Mangalore section | Terminus |
| Terminus | Southern Railway zone Shoranur–Mangalore section | Nethravathi towards Shoranur Junction |
| Mangalore Junction towards Mysore Junction | Mangalore–Hassan–Mysore line | Terminus |
Route map
- Sources
Location
- Location within India Location within Karnataka
- Interactive map

Mangalore Central railway station (officially Mangaluru Central railway station)(station code: MAQ) is an NSG–2 category Indian railway station in Mysore railway division of South Western Railway zone, and was transferred from Palakkad division of Southern Railway zone with effective from (w.e.f) date 1 October 2026. It is the main railway terminus in the city of Mangaluru, Karnataka and provides connectivity for Konkan Railway and South Western Railway. It is one of the five central railway stations of India.

== History ==
Mangalore Railway Station presently known as Mangalore Central, had celebrated a quiet centenary in 2007. Though there are no exact records to prove that the railway station was opened in 1907 and the first train services commenced the same year, if one goes by the foundation stone on a quaint little guard house at the northern-end of the railway bridge across the Netravathi which says "The last rivet was put in position and the bridge formally declared completed by H.E. Sir Arthur Lawley. KCMG, GCIE, Governor of Madras on the 4th November 1907," one can conclude that the train services commenced somewhere around this time.

Though some records say that the first train that chugged on the newly constructed Netravathi bridge on 4 November 1907 came from Kallikote in Kerala, records with the Southern Railways say that the first train to be introduced in the zone, train number-1, ran its maiden journey between erstwhile Madras and Mangalore port in 1914, reducing the voyage of 1024 nautical miles via Cape Comorin to 550 miles.

This broad gauge railway route was formed mainly for the transportation of world famous Mangalore tiles to Madras Harbour to be exported by ships. Thus the same train returned after one week as train No.2. containing 3 compartments with Mangalore tiles and the fourth one with passengers and postal mailbags. The same train is the present No.6001/6002 Chennai Central-Mangalore Mail. The Mangalore Railway Station used to be the last station connecting Mangalore to the state of Kerala in the south and to the rest of the country. No doubt, the first train services in the region opened a new chapter in the history of the area and paved way for much progress. Mangalore was then in the Madras province under the British rule. The construction of the Netravathi Bridge in Ullal using 16 spans of 150 feet length each was taken up around this time. A few years later, in 1929, the Grand Trunk Express was introduced that ran for 104 hours through the length of the west coast, from Mangalore to Peshawar in Pakistan. In those days, it was the longest rail route in the country. In 1930, Mangalore was made a permanent station from a trial station. A glance at the railway history of the nation will make anyone outrightly conclude that Mangalore railway station has been a much neglected station over the years. If train services in the nation commenced in 1853, in Mangalore it arrived 55 years later. Now though it is over hundred years since the railway station was established, we see not much progress except a few changes. The old building was renovated just over a decade ago. Except for some developmental work there has been not much of a progress to boast of.

It was during T.A. Pai’s tenure as Railway Minister in 1971 that the first direct link train No. 131/132 Jayanthi Janatha Express from Mangalore to Delhi commenced with the Mangalore Railway Station as the starting point. Apart from the Konkan Railway Corporation, even the Mangalore-Jammu Tavi Navyug Express is George Fernandes’s gift to his hometown Mangalore. A metre-gauge railway track, built through the Western Ghats, connected Mangalore with Hassan. The metre-gauge track was converted to a broad-gauge track connecting Mangalore to Bangalore via Hassan. The re-gauged track was opened to freight traffic in May 2006 and passenger traffic in December 2007. The track network in the Mangalore area is based on a triangular pattern, with Mangalore Central, Mangalore Junction and the Netravati River railway bridge at the vertices of the triangle.

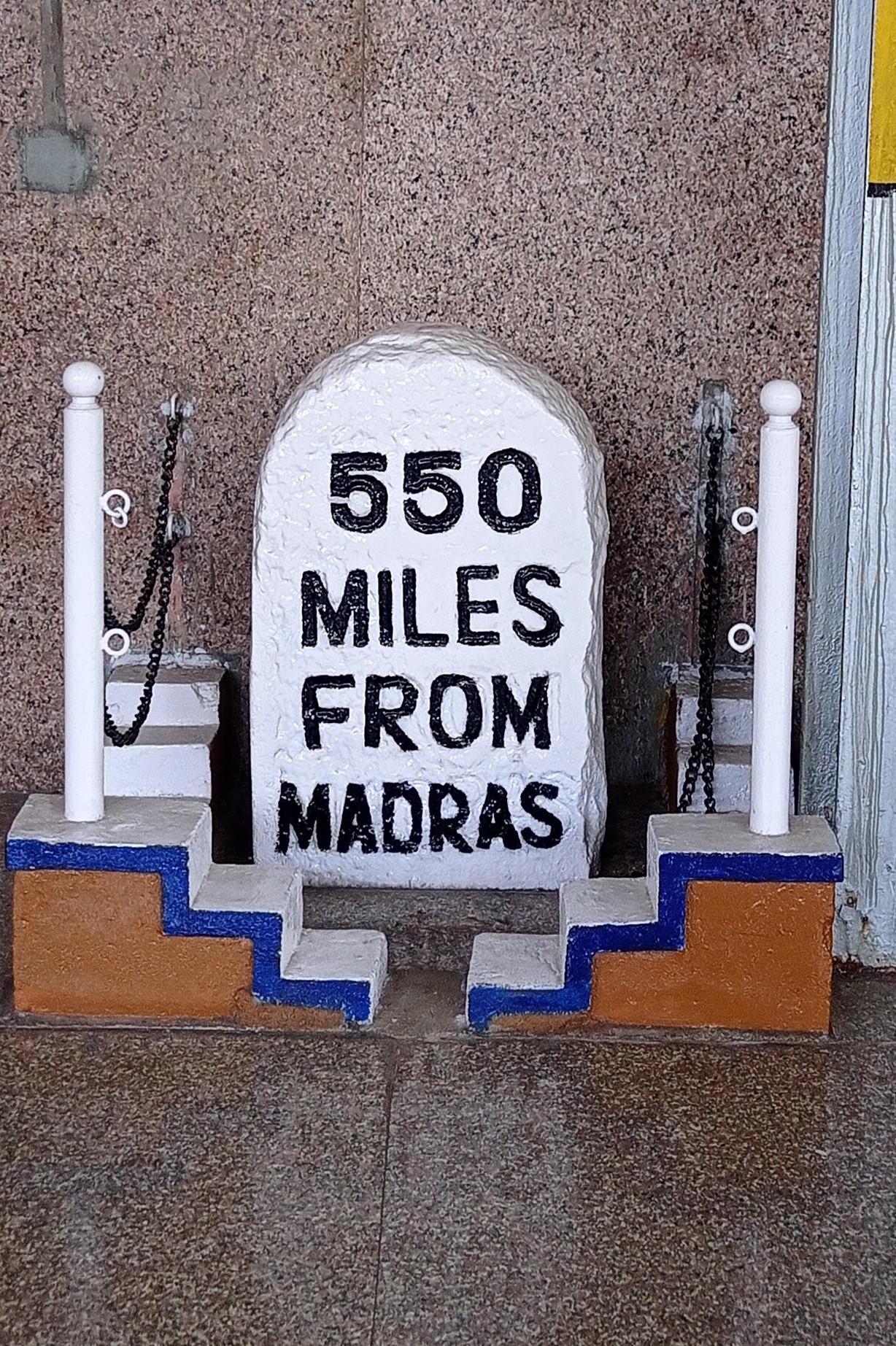
Historic plaque at Mangalore Railway Station, showing the distance to Madras, now Chennai.

A railway siding leads from Mangalore Central to the historic old Railway Goods-Shed in the old Port, Bunder area of Mangaluru city.

=== Changes of name ===
The two railway stations in Mangaluru (then known as Mangalore) used to be called "Mangalore Railway Station" and "Kankanady Station". But this caused passengers problems if they did not know that Kankanady station was in Mangaluru. It made it difficult buying tickets, because staff in ticket offices did not offer tickets to Kankanady Station if passengers asked for a ticket to Mangalore. And passengers to Mangaluru often did not get off the train at Kankanady Station and carried on to the next stop by mistake. So in 2003, the state government asked for the two stations to be renamed. At the same time, the railway authorities denied that there was any proposal to move Mangalore Railway Station to Kankanady, though they had moved the fuelling point to Kankanady with a view to making it possible for 24-bogie trains to stop at Mangalore Railway Station. The change of name was approved in October 2007, and the two stations became Mangalore Central and Mangalore Junction respectively.

The Karnataka state government made a proposal on 27 October 2006 to change the English-language names of twelve towns and cities (including Mangalore) so that they were consistent with their pronunciation in the Kannada language. This was proposal was accepted in October 2014 after the Survey of India, Ministry of Railways, Department of Posts, Ministry of Science and Technology and Intelligence Bureau had all said that they had no objections. The town and city names changed on 1 November 2014. Instructions were issued for post offices and railway stations to be renamed accordingly.

In November 2020, opposition politicians of Mangaluru City Corporation asked the mayor to rename the Central station: "Sri Narayana Gurudeva Railway Station", in memory of Narayana Guru who used the station in 1908 when he came to the city.

== Administrative reorganization ==
Mangaluru Area

With effect from 1st October 2026, the Railway lines of Mangaluru area was merged with the Mysuru railway division of South Western Railway (SWR) to facilitate more efficient administrative management. The Government of India issued the related Gazette notification on 21 August 2026,outlining the changes to the railway administrative jurisdiction.

Railway Board NOTIFICATION

New Delhi, the 21st August, 2026

No. 2025/E&R/1(3)/1.

1. It is hereby notified for general information that keeping in view the operational requirements, Central Government has decided to revise the jurisdictional boundaries of Mysuru division of South Western Railway, Konkan Railway and Palakkad division of Southern Railway.

2. The divisional/zonal boundary between Mysuru division of South Western Railway and Palakkad division of Southern Railway is now fixed at Km 872.900 on Shoranur Jn.- Mangaluru Central section.

3. The existing divisional/zonal boundary between Konkan Railway and Southern Railway will become the divisional/zonal boundary between Konkan Railway and South Western Railway.

4. The interchange point between Mysuru division of South Western Railway and Palakkad division of Southern Railway will accordingly shift from Padil to Ullal.

5. The existing interchange point between Palakkad division of Southern Railway and Konkan Railway at Thokur will now be the interchange point between Konkan Railway and Mysuru division of South Western Railway.

6. These changes in the above jurisdiction will come into effect from 1st Oct.’ 2026.

== Location ==
Mangalore Central railway station is located at Old Kent Road, Hampankatta. The other major railway station in the city, Mangalore Junction located at Darbar Hill, Padil, Mangaluru 575007.

== Services ==
Mangalore Central has many trains that either start or terminate at the station. Popular trains includes Mangaluru-Madgaon Vande Bharat Express, West Coast Superfast Express, Matsyagandha Express, Thiruvananthapuram Central–Mangaluru Central Express, Mangaluru Central - M.G .R Chennai Central SF Express, Mangaluru Central–Thiruvananthapuram Vande Bharat Express (via Alappuzha), Vivek Express (Santragachi), Chennai Mail, Malabar Express, Maveli Express, Parasuram Express etc Southern Railway connects Kanyakumari, Chennai,Trivandrum,Rameswaram,Tirunelveli. South Western Railway connects Bengaluru, Vijayapura,Mysuru,Hassan. Konkan Railway connects Mumbai

== See also ==
- Surathkal railway station
- Thokur railway station
- Mangalore Mail
