= Rameswaram–Mangaluru Weekly Express =

Train in India

Rameswaram - Mangaluru Weekly Express
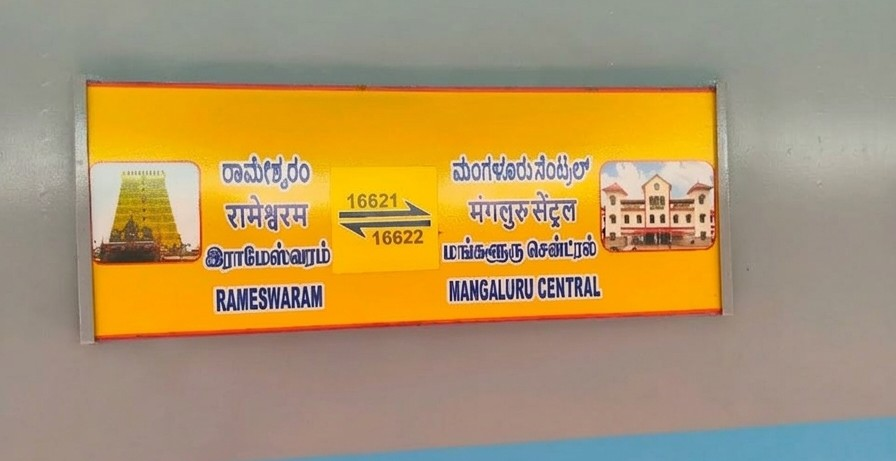

Overview
- Service type: Express
- Status: Active
- Locale: Tamil Nadu, Kerala and Karnataka
- First service: 15 March 2026; 6 months ago
- Current operator: South Western Railway (SWR)

Route
- Termini: Rameswaram (RMM); Mangaluru Central (MAQ)
- Stops: 17
- Distance travelled: 753 km (468 mi)
- Average journey time: 15h 25m
- Service frequency: Weekly
- Train number: 16621 / 16622

On-board services
- Classes: General Unreserved, Sleeper Class, AC 3rd Class, AC 2nd Class
- Seating arrangements: Yes
- Sleeping arrangements: Yes
- Catering facilities: On-Board catering
- Observation facilities: Large windows
- Baggage facilities: No
- Other facilities: Below the seats

Technical
- Rolling stock: LHB coach
- Track gauge: 1,676 mm (5 ft 6 in)
- Electrification: 25 kV 50 Hz AC Overhead line
- Operating speed: 130 km/h (81 mph) maximum, 49 km/h (30 mph) average including halts.
- Track owner: Indian Railways

The 16621 / 16622 Rameswaram–Mangaluru Weekly Express is an express train belonging to South Western Railway zone that runs between the city Rameswaram of Tamil Nadu and Mangaluru Central of Karnataka in India.

It operates as train number 16621 from Rameswaram to Mangaluru Central and as train number 16622 in the reverse direction, serving the states of Karnataka, Kerala and Tamil Nadu.

== Services ==
• 16621/ Rameswaram–Mangaluru Weekly Express has an average speed of 49 km/h and covers 753 km in 15h 25m.

• 16622/ Mangaluru–Rameswaram Weekly Express has an average speed of 49 km/h and covers 753 km in 15h 20m.

== Route and halts ==
The Important Halts of the train are :

- Rameswaram
- Ramanathapuram
- Paramakudi
- Manamadurai Junction
- Madurai Junction
- Dindigul Junction
- Oddanchatram
- Pollachi Junction
- Palakkad Junction
- Shoranur Junction
- Tirur
- Kozhikode
- Kannur
- Kasaragod
- Mangaluru Central

== Schedule ==
• 16621 - 3:30 PM (Sunday) [Rameswaram]

• 16622 - 7:30 PM (Saturday) [Mangaluru Central]

== Coach composition ==
1. General Unreserved - 4
2. Sleeper Class - 6
3. AC 3rd Class - 6
4. AC 2nd Class - 2

== Traction ==
As the entire route is fully electrified it is hauled by a Erode Shed-based WAP-7 electric locomotive from Rameswaram to Mangaluru Central and vice versa.

== Rake reversal ==
The train will reverse 1 time :

1. Palakkad Junction

== See also ==
Trains from Rameswaram:

1. Firozpur–Rameswaram Humsafar Express
2. Sethu Express
3. Rameswaram–Faizabad Shraddha Sethu Express
4. Rameswaram–Okha Express
5. Rameswaram–Bhubaneswar Express

Trains from Mangaluru Central:

1. Ernad Express
2. Chennai Egmore–Mangaluru Central Express
3. Mangaluru Central–Thiruvananthapuram Vande Bharat Express
4. Chennai Central–Mangaluru Central Superfast Express
5. Mangaluru Central–Madgaon Vande Bharat Express

== Notes ==
a. Runs one day in a week with both directions.

There are huge public demand to grant stoppage at Thalassery,Ottapalam,Palakkad Town,Kollengode, Kodaikanal road and Mandapam for this train in both directions and also to increase periodicity of operation.
