= Ernakulam–Kannur Express =

Alappuzha–Kannur Express
Overview
- Service type: Express
- Current operator: Southern Railway zone

Route
- Termini: Alappuzha (ALLP); Kannur (CAN)
- Stops: 26
- Distance travelled: 282 km (175 mi)
- Average journey time: 6h 15m
- Service frequency: Daily
- Train number: 16307/16308

On-board services
- Classes: AC Chair Car, Second Sitting, General Unreserved
- Seating arrangements: No
- Sleeping arrangements: Yes
- Catering facilities: On-board catering E-catering
- Observation facilities: ICF coach
- Entertainment facilities: No
- Baggage facilities: No
- Other facilities: Below the seats

Technical
- Rolling stock: 2
- Track gauge: 1,676 mm (5 ft 6 in)
- Operating speed: 45 km/h (28 mph), including halts

The Alappuzha–Kannur Executive Express is an Express train belonging to Southern Railway zone that runs between Alappuzha and Kannur in India. It is currently being operated with 16307/16308 train numbers on a daily basis from Alappuzha.

== Service ==
The 16307/Alappuzha–Kannur Executive Express has an average speed of 45 km/h and covers 282 km in 6h 15m. The 16308/Kannur–Alappuzha Executive Express has an average speed of 43 km/h and covers 282 km in 6h 35m.

== Route and halts ==
The important halts of the train are:

- Alappuzha
- Chertala
- Ernakulam Junction
- Ernakulam Town
- Aluva
- Thrissur
- Shoranur Junction
- Tirur
- Parappanangadi
- Kozhikode
- Mahe
- Thalassery
- Kannur

== Coach composition ==
The train has standard ICF rakes with a maximum speed of 110 km/h. The train consists of 20 coaches:

- 2 AC Chair Car
- 2 Second Sitting
- 14 General Unreserved
- 2 Seating cum Luggage Rake

== Traction ==
Both trains are hauled by an Erode Loco Shed-based WAP-4 electric locomotive from Ernakulam to Kannur and vice versa.

== Rake sharing ==
The train shares its rake with 16313/16314 Ernakulam−Kannur Intercity Express, 16303/16304 Vanchinad Express and 16307/16308 Alappuzha–Kannur Express.

== See also ==
- Alappuzha railway station
- Kannur railway station
- Ernakulam−Kannur Intercity Express
- Vanchinad Express
