= Mangaluru–Coimbatore Intercity Express =

Mangaluru - Coimbatore Intercity Superfast Express
Overview
- Service type: Intercity Superfast Express
- Status: Running daily
- First service: 18 November 2011; 14 years ago
- Current operator: South Western Railways
- Ridership: Daily

Route
- Termini: Mangaluru Central; Coimbatore Junction
- Stops: 12
- Distance travelled: 407 km (253 mi)
- Average journey time: 7 hours
- Service frequency: Daily
- Train number: 22609 / 22610

On-board services
- Classes: AC Chair car, Second Sitting, General Unreserved
- Seating arrangements: Yes
- Sleeping arrangements: Yes
- Catering facilities: No
- Observation facilities: Rake Sharing with 16605 / 16606 Ernad Express

Technical
- Rolling stock: Standard Indian Railways Coaches
- Track gauge: 1,676 mm (5 ft 6 in)
- Electrification: Fully Electrified
- Operating speed: 60 km/h (37 mph)

The 22609 / 22610 Mangaluru Central - Coimbatore - Mangaluru Central Intercity S.F Express is a Daily Intercity Superfast Express train belonging to Indian Railways South Western Railway zone that runs between Mangaluru Central and Coimbatore Junction in India. This service was started on 18th Nov 2011 from Palakkad Junction & it got extended to Coimbatore in the year 2012. It is one of the most preferred train by the commuters of this route connecting Mangaluru Central in Karnataka and Coimbatore junction in Tamil Nadu. Mangaluru Central to Coimbatore Junction Intercity Superfast Express is the Fastest train from Mangaluru Central to Coimbatore Junction and vice versa.

It operates as train number 22609 from Mangaluru Central to Coimbatore Junction and as train number 22610 in the reverse direction serving the states of Karnataka, Kerala & Tamil Nadu.

== Coaches ==
The 22609 / 22610 Mangalore Central - Coimbatore Junction Intercity Superfast Express has

- 02 AC Chair Car,
- 05 Second Sitting,
- 13 General Unreserved,
- 02 SLR (seating with luggage rake) Fully ICF Coaches.

It does not carry a Pantry car coach.

As is customary with most train services in India, coach composition may be amended at the discretion of Indian Railways depending on demand.

== Service ==
The 22609 Mangalore Central - Coimbatore Junction Intercity Superfast Express covers the distance of 407 km (253 mi) in 7 hours (58 km/h) and in 7 hours as the 22610 Coimbatore Junction - Mangalore Central Intercity Superfast Express (58 km/h).

As the average speed of the train is above 55 km/h (34 mph), as per railway rules, its fare includes a Superfast surcharge.

== Routing ==
The 22609 / 10 Mangalore Central - Coimbatore Junction Intercity Express runs from Mangaluru Central via Kasaragod, Kanhangad, Nileshwar,Payannur ,Kannur, Thalassery, Vadakara, Kozhikode, Parappanangadi, Tirur, Shoranur Junction, Ottapalam, Palakkad Junction to Coimbatore Junction.

== Traction ==
As the route is fully electrified, an Erode based WAP-4 or Royapuram based WAP-7 electric locomotive pulls the train to its destination.
