= Tokkottu railway station =

Railway station in Karnataka, India

Thokkottu

General information
- Location: India
- Coordinates: 12.8223°N 74.8576°E
- System: Regional rail station
- Connections: Bus stand, Taxicab stand, Auto rickshaw stand

Construction
- Structure type: Standard (on-ground station)
- Parking: Yes

Other information
- Status: Closed
- Station code
- Zone(s): South Western Railway zone
- Division(s): Mysore

History
- Closed: Yes

Services
| Preceding station | Indian Railways | Following station |
|---|---|---|
| Nethravathi towards Thokur or Mangalore Central | Southern Railway zone Shoranur–Mangalore section | Ullal towards Shoranur Junction |
Route map
- Sources
Location

Thokkottu railway station (station code: TKOT) is a railway station serving Mangalore city, the second major city of Karnataka. It lies to the south of Mangalore city in Mysore railway division of South Western Railway zone under Indian Railways. Trains halting at the station connect this region to prominent cities in India such as Thiruvananthapuram, Kochi, Chennai, Kollam, Bangalore, Kozhikode, Coimbatore, Mysore and so forth. The station is now closed.
