= Ernad Express =

Train in India

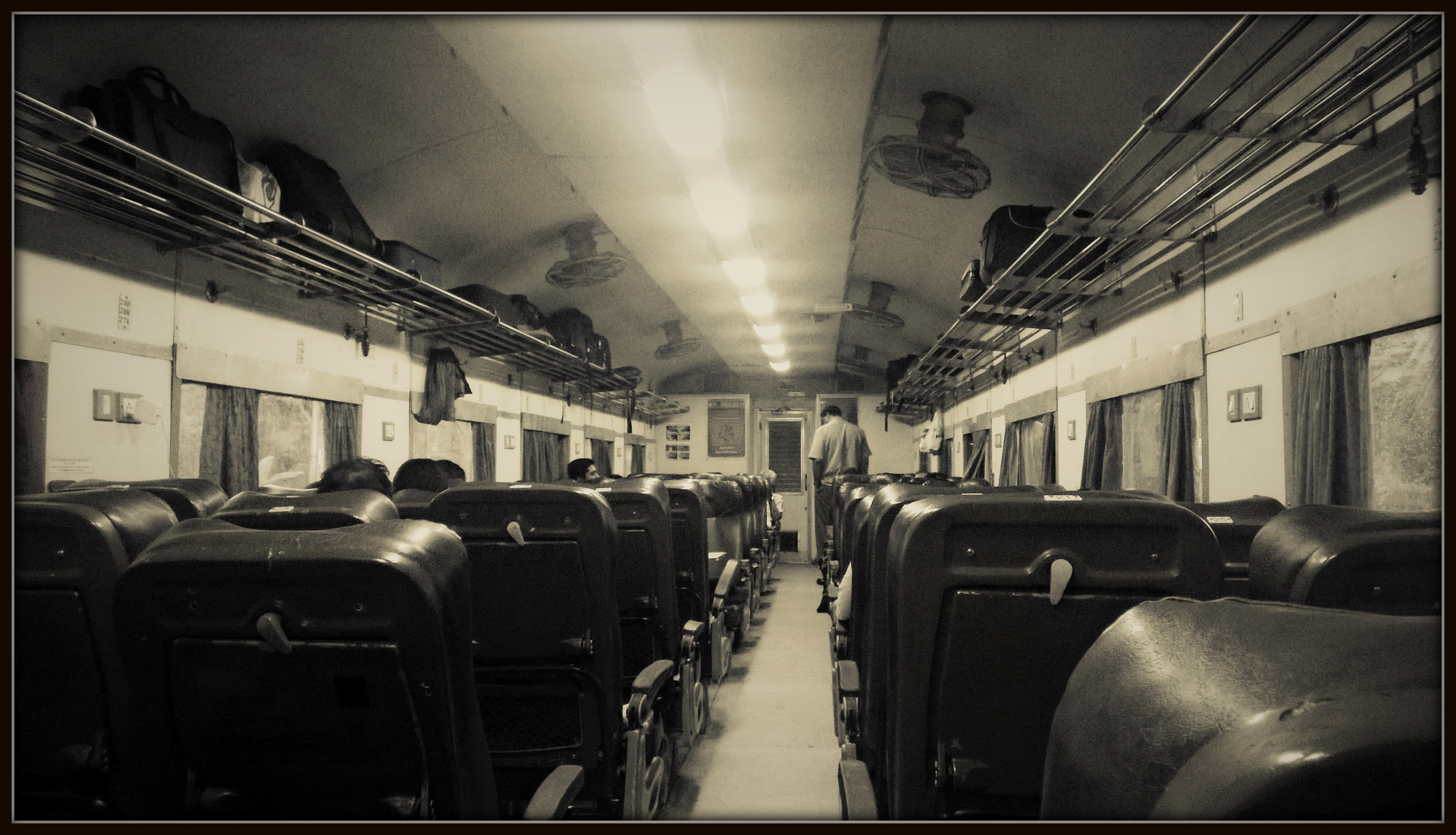
- AC chair car wagon in Venad Express

Overview
- Service type: Express
- Locale: Karnataka & Kerala
- First service: 13 September 2009; 17 years ago
- Current operator: South Western Railway

Route
- Termini: Mangaluru Central (MAQ); Thiruvananthapuram Central (TVC)
- Stops: 37
- Distance travelled: 620 km (385 mi)
- Average journey time: 13 hours 40 minutes
- Service frequency: Daily
- Train number: 16605 / 16606

On-board services
- Classes: AC chair car, Second class seating, General Unreserved
- Seating arrangements: Yes
- Sleeping arrangements: No
- Auto-rack arrangements: Overhead racks
- Catering facilities: E-catering only
- Baggage facilities: Available
- Other facilities: Below the seats

Technical
- Rolling stock: ICF coach
- Track gauge: Broad Gauge
- Operating speed: 45 km/h (28 mph) average including halts.
Route map
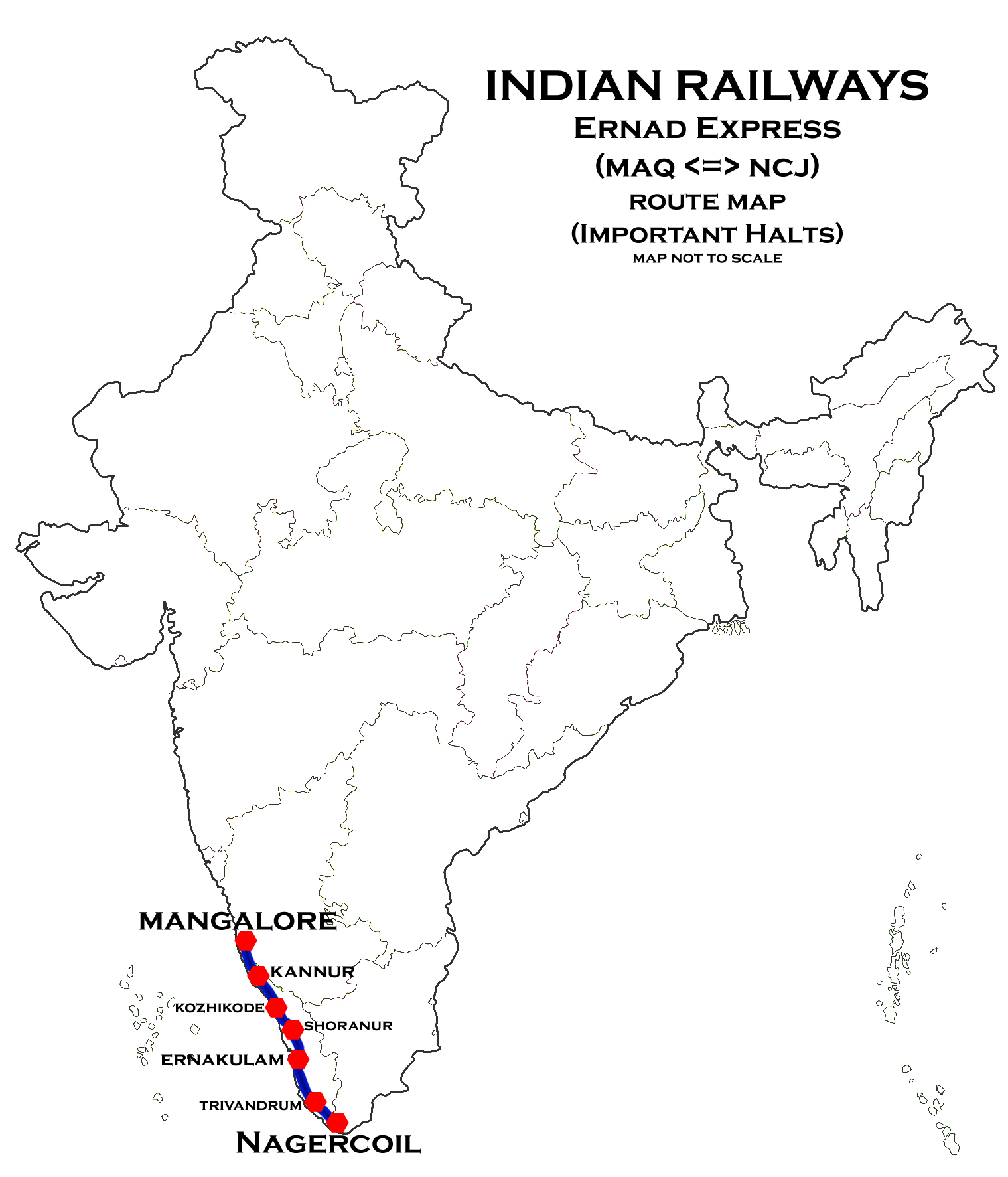

The 16605 / 16606 Ernad Express is an Express train run by the South Western Railway zone of the Indian Railways between Mangalore Central railway station in Karnataka and Thiruvananthapuram Central railway station in Kerala.

Train number 16605 runs from Mangaluru to Thiruvananthapuram Central and on the return journey, the train number 16606 runs from Trivandrum to Mangalore, covering the 620km in 13 hours and 40 minutes.

== Route and halts ==
The train has stoppage at Mangaluru Central railway station, Manjeshwar, Kumbla, Kasaragod, Kanhangad, Nileshwar, Cheruvathur, Payyanur, Valapattanam, Kannur, Thalassery, Mahe, Vadakara, Payyoli, Koyilandy, Kozhikode, Ferok, Vallikkunnu, Parappanangadi, Tanur, Tirur, Kuttippuram, Shoranur Junction, Thrissur, Chalakudi, Aluva, Ernakulam Junction (South), Thuravoor, Cherthala, Alappuzha, Ambalappuzha, Haripad, Kayamkulam Junction, Karunagappalli, Kollam Junction, Varkala, Thiruvananthapuram Central

== Traction ==
As the route is fully electrified. It is hauled by WAP-4 from Erode Loco Shed or Arakkonam Loco Shed.

As the average speed of the train is lower than 55 km/h (34 mph), as per Indian Railways rules, its fare doesn't include a Superfast surcharge
