= Yesvantpur–Kannur Express =

Overview
- Service type: Express
- Locale: Kerala, Tamilnadu, Karnataka, Mahe
- First service: 1 January 2001; 25 years ago
- Current operator: South Western Railway zone

Route
- Termini: Yesvantpur Junction (YPR); Kannur (CAN)
- Stops: 18
- Distance travelled: 660 km (410 mi)
- Average journey time: 13h 20m
- Service frequency: Daily (Note: Runs seven days in a week for every direction.)
- Train number: 16527/16528

On-board services
- Classes: AC first class, AC 2 tier, AC 3 tier, Sleeper class, General Unreserved
- Seating arrangements: No
- Sleeping arrangements: Yes
- Catering facilities: On-board catering E-catering
- Observation facilities: LHB coach
- Entertainment facilities: No
- Baggage facilities: No
- Other facilities: Below the seats

Technical
- Rolling stock: LHB coaches
- Track gauge: 1,676 mm (5 ft 6 in)
- Operating speed: 53 km/h (33 mph)

The Yesvantpur–Kannur Express is an Express train belonging to South Western Railway zone that runs between Yesvantpur (Bangalore) and Kannur in India. It is currently being operated with 16527/16528 train numbers on a daily basis.

== Service ==
The 16527/Yesvantpur–Kannur Express has an average speed of 48 km/h and covers 660 km in 13h 45m. The 16528/Kannur–Yesvantpur Express has an average speed of 48 km/h and covers 660 km in 13h 45m. Earlier was WDM-3A or WDG-3A now it is hauled by a WAP-7 based in Diesel & Electric Loco Shed, Krishnarajapuram. It uses a long route, the shortest route being via Mysore Junction and Mangalore Junction. Train number 16512/16513 serves this route. During the COVID-19 pandemic, the train's numbering was changed to 07389(to Kannur) and 07390(from Kannur). The regular numbering, 16527/28, was restored on Nov 26, 2021.

== Route and halts ==
The halts of the train are:

- Yesvantpur Junction
- Banaswadi
- Karmelaram
- Hosur
- Dharmapuri
- Salem Junction
- Erode Junction
- Tiruppur
- Coimbatore Junction
- Palakkad Junction
- Shoranur Junction
- Kuttippuram
- Tirur
- Parappanangadi
- Kozhikode
- Quilandi
- Vadakara
- Thalassery
- Kannur

== Incidents ==
On 12 November 2021, at least 7 coaches of the train, operating as 07390/Kannur-Yesvantpur Special, derailed after boulders fell on it, between Sivadi and Muthampatti, along the Omalur-Bengaluru section, as a result of heavy rain and wind. All 2,348 passengers on board escaped unhurt.

On April 9, 2024, a significant theft occurred in the AC coaches between Salem and Dharmapuri, where over 20 passengers reported missing valuables such as mobile phones, jewellery and cash. Some passengers' bags were later found abandoned in the train's toilets.
