= Kasaragod–Thiruvananthapuram Vande Bharat Express =

Vande Bharat Express train route in India

Kasaragod–Thiruvananthapuram Central Vande Bharat Express

Overview
- Service type: Vande Bharat Express
- Status: Operational
- Locale: Kerala
- First service: 25 April 2023 (Inaugural run); 26 April 2023; 3 years ago (Commercial run)
- Current operator: Southern Railways (SR) Thiruvananthapuram Division

Route
- Termini: Kasaragod (KGQ); Thiruvananthapuram Central (TVC)
- Stops: Thiruvananthapuram Central-Kollam Jn-Chengannur-Kottayam-Ernakulam Town-Thrissur-Shoranur Jn-Kozhikode-Kannur-Kasargod
- Distance travelled: 586 km (364 mi)
- Average journey time: 08hrs 05mins
- Service frequency: Six days a week (Note: Except Thursdays)
- Train number: 20633 / 20634
- Lines used: Shoranur–Mangalore section Shoranur–Cochin Harbour section Ernakulam–Kottayam-Kollam line Kollam–Thiruvananthapuram trunk line

On-board services
- Classes: AC chair car, AC executive chair car
- Seating arrangements: Airline style; Rotatable seats
- Sleeping arrangements: No
- Catering facilities: On-board catering
- Observation facilities: Large windows in all coaches
- Entertainment facilities: On-board WiFi; Infotainment system; Electric outlets; Reading light; Seat pockets; Bottle holder; Tray table
- Baggage facilities: Overhead racks
- Other facilities: Kavach

Technical
- Rolling stock: Vande Bharat 2.0 (Last service: 8 Jan 2025); Vande Bharat 3.0 (First service: 10 Jan 2025)
- Track gauge: Indian gauge 1,676 mm (5 ft 6 in) broad gauge
- Electrification: 25 kV 50 Hz AC Overhead line
- Operating speed: 110 km/h (68 mph) (maximum); 73 km/h (45 mph) (Avg.)
- Average length: 480 metres (1,570 ft) (20 coaches)
- Track owner: Indian Railways
- Rake maintenance: Kochuveli, Thiruvananthapuram

The 20633/20634 Kasaragod–Thiruvananthapuram Central Vande Bharat Express is India's 15th Vande Bharat Express train, connecting Kasaragod with state capital Thiruvananthapuram in Kerala. The train service was officially inaugurated on 25 April 2023 by Prime Minister Narendra Modi at Thiruvananthapuram Central. As of July 2023, it is the best-performing Vande Bharat Express train service with an average occupancy of 183 per cent, according to official data.

== Overview ==
This train is operated by Indian Railways, connecting Kasaragod, Kannur, Kozhikode, Shoranur Junction, Thrissur, Ernakulam Town, Kottayam, Chengannur, Kollam Junction and Thiruvananthapuram Central. This is the first Vande Bharat Express train for Kerala and the third Vande Bharat Express train for Southern Railways. It is operated with train numbers 20633/20634 on 6 days a week basis.

== Rakes ==
It was the thirteenth 2nd Generation Vande Bharat Express train which was designed and manufactured by the Integral Coach Factory (ICF) under the leadership of Sudhanshu Mani at Perambur, Chennai under the Make in India initiative.

As per latest updates, the current running rake Has been converted to 20-car rake as this would benefit the passengers heading towards the capital city of Kerala, Trivandrum and other key stations like Kozhikode, Ernakulam Town and Kollam. This conversion of 16 coaches to 20 coaches commenced on 10 January 2025, starting from Trivandrum Central railway station.

This is the third change in the Vande Bharat Express services after New Delhi – Varanasi Vande Bharat Express and Varanasi–New Delhi Vande Bharat Express.

== Service ==
The 20633/20634 Kasaragod–Thiruvananthapuram Ctrl Vande Bharat Express operates six days a week except Thursdays, covering a distance of 586 km (364 mi) in a travel time of 8 hours with an average speed of 72 km/h (45 mph). The service has 8 intermediate stops. The Maximum Permissible Speed is 130 km/h (81 mph).

== Incidents ==
Just a few days after the commercial run of this Vande Bharat Express train, an unidentified man pelted stones on this express train on Monday, 1 May 2023. This incident occurred near the Tirur railway station in the Malappuram district in Kerala around 5pm. Despite the crack, this train continued the journey and halted at the Shoranur Junction railway station. Once on arrival, the railway protection force inspected the cracks to find out this issue. Luckily no casualties were reported during this incident.

On 4 December 2024, the train returning from Kasaragod to Trivandrum faced an engine failure and was held up at the Shoranur Junction. As a result, the train was delayed for an hour.

== See also ==
- Mangaluru Central–Thiruvananthapuram Vande Bharat Express
- KSR Bengaluru–Ernakulam Junction Vande Bharat Express
- Kannur–Thiruvananthapuram Jan Shatabdi Express
- Kozhikode–Thiruvananthapuram Jan Shatabdi Express
- Thiruvananthapuram North–Lokmanya Tilak Terminus Garib Rath Express
- Thiruvananthapuram Central railway station
- Kasaragod railway station
