= Mangaluru Central–Thiruvananthapuram Vande Bharat Express =

Vande Bharat Express train route in India

Mangaluru Central – Thiruvananthapuram Central Vande Bharat Express
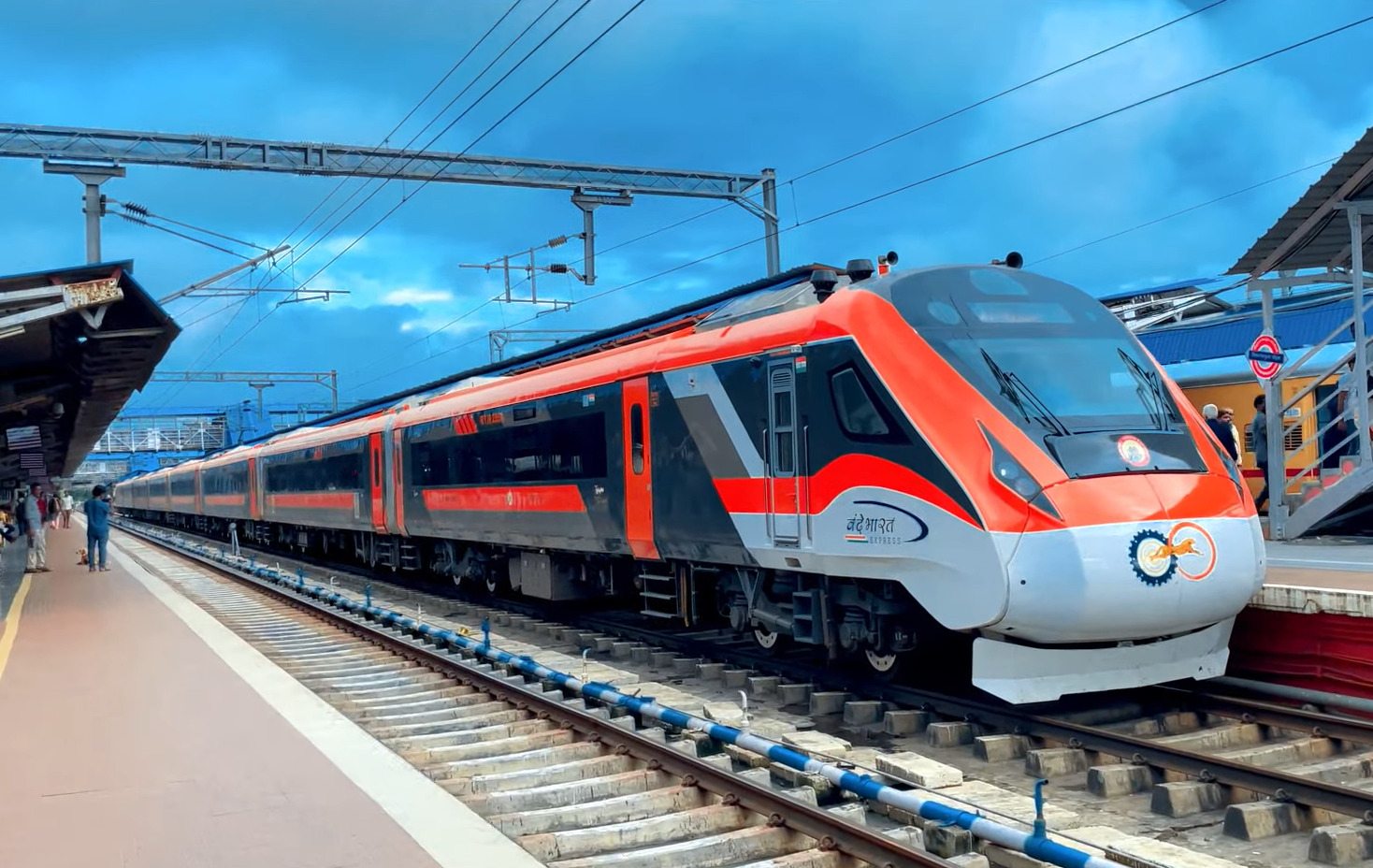
- First Saffron-Grey Mini Vande Bharat Express at Thiruvananthapuram Central departing for Kasaragod

Overview
- Service type: Vande Bharat Express
- Status: Active
- Locale: Karnataka and Kerala
- First service: 25 September 2023 (Commercial run); 12 March 2024; 2 years ago (Extended run)
- Current operator: South Western Railways (SWR)

Route
- Termini: Mangaluru Central (MAQ); Thiruvananthapuram Central (TVC)
- Stops: 9
- Distance travelled: 620 km (385 mi)
- Average journey time: 08hrs 40mins
- Service frequency: 6 days a week (Note: Except Wednesdays)
- Train number: 26659 / 26660
- Lines used: Shoranur–Mangalore section Shoranur–Cochin Harbour section Ernakulam–Kayamkulam coastal line Kollam–Thiruvananthapuram trunk line

On-board services
- Classes: AC Chair Car, AC Executive Chair Car
- Seating arrangements: Airline style; Rotatable seats
- Sleeping arrangements: No
- Auto-rack arrangements: Yes
- Catering facilities: On-board catering
- Observation facilities: Large windows in all coaches
- Entertainment facilities: On-board WiFi; Infotainment System; Electric outlets; Reading light; Seat Pockets; Bottle Holder; Tray Table
- Baggage facilities: Overhead racks
- Other facilities: Kavach

Technical
- Rolling stock: Vande Bharat 2.0 (Last service: Sept 08 2025); Vande Bharat 3.0 (First service: Sept 09 2025)
- Track gauge: Indian gauge 1,676 mm (5 ft 6 in) broad gauge
- Electrification: 25 kV 50 Hz AC Overhead line
- Operating speed: 72 km/h (45 mph) (Avg.)
- Average length: 415 metres (1,362 ft) (20 coaches)
- Track owner: Indian Railways
- Rake maintenance: Mangaluru Central, Mysore railway division

The 26659/26660 Mangaluru Central - Thiruvananthapuram Vande Bharat Express is India's 33rd Vande Bharat Express train, connecting West Karnataka's coastal city Mangaluru with Kerala's south and state capital Thiruvananthapuram. It is the second Vande Bharat Express in Kerala as well as India's first saffron coloured semi-high speed train (replaced with White Blue Vandebharat rake of the pairing train after extension to Mangalore Central).

== History ==
The first Vande Bharat train in Kerala started its service between Kasaragod and Thiruvananthapuram via Kottayam route in April 2023. With increase in patronage, there has been a strong demand by the passengers to have a second Vande Bharat between Mangalore and Thiruvananthapuram so as to increase the frequency of this route per day to three trains. This vande bharat express is the fastest train between Mangaluru Central to Thiruvananthapuram Central and vice versa.

The initial service of this Vande Bharat Express train from Kasaragod to Thiruvananthapuram Central was inaugurated on 24 September 2023 by Prime Minister Narendra Modi via video conference from New Delhi. The extension of train from Kasaragod to Mangaluru was inaugurated on 12 March 2024 by Prime Minister Narendra Modi via video conference from Ahmedabad.

== Overview ==
This train is operated by Indian Railways, connecting Mangaluru Ctrl, Kasaragod, Kannur, Kozhikode, Tirur, Shoranur Junction, Thrissur, Ernakulam Junction, Alappuzha, Kollam Junction and Thiruvananthapuram Central. It is the second Vande Bharat Express train allocated to Kerala. It is currently operated with train numbers 26659/26660.

== Rakes ==
It was the thirty-first 2nd Generation and nineteenth Mini Vande Bharat 2.0 Express train which was designed and manufactured by the Integral Coach Factory at Perambur, Chennai under the Make in India Initiative. It is India's first Mini VB 2.0 Express train, running the tracks with the Saffron-Grey livery with 25 more modifications in the rakes. As per reports, a pairing train rake is allocated as there are a few problems in the maintenance of the train as per the current Time Table.

=== Switch of Rakes ===
After extension till Mangalore, the maintenance problem has been resolved and the Saffron Grey rakes are swapped and replaced with White Blue Vandebharat rake of the pairing train. In August 2024, the Saffron Grey rake was made to run as temporary special service along Ernakulam - SMVT Bengaluru route. As of September 2024, the first saffron colored Vande Bharat rake is moved to Howrah - Rourkela route and the Mangaluru Central–Thiruvananthapuram Vande Bharat Express is running with one and only White Blue 8 car coach.

=== Coach Augmentation ===
The 26659/26660 Mangaluru Central - Thiruvananthapuram Central Vande Bharat Express was permanently augmented with 08 more coaches and was running with 16-car Vande Bharat 2.0 trainset W.E.F. 22 May 2025 in order to meet the extra rush and passenger demands. The 16-coach trainset was earlier running as Chennai Egmore–Nagercoil VB Express, which started from the capital city of Tamil Nadu, Chennai and terminated at the Temple City of Nāgas, Nagercoil.

As of September 11, 2025, this express train has been further augmented with 4 additional AC coaches and is currently running with Vande Bharat 3.0 trainset, in order to meet the surge in passenger demand on this popular route.

== Service ==
The 26659/26660 Mangaluru Ctrl - Thiruvananthapuram Ctrl Vande Bharat Express operates six days a week except Wednesdays, covering a distance of 620 km (390 mi) in a travel time of 8 hours with an average speed of 72 km/h (45 mph). The service has 9 intermediate stops. The Maximum Permissible Speed is 110 km/h (68 mph).

Mangaluru Ctrl - Thiruvananthapuram Ctrl Vande Bharat Express (26659)
Station	Station Code	Arrival	Departure	Halt (min)	Distance (km)	Day
Mangalore Cntl	MAQ	—	06:25	—	—	1
Kasaragod	KGQ	06:58	07:00	2	46	1
Kannur	CAN	07:55	07:57	2	132	1
Kozhikode	CLT	08:57	08:59	2	221	1
Tirur	TIR	09:22	09:24	2	262	1
Shoranur Jn	SRR	09:58	10:00	2	307	1
Thrissur	TCR	10:33	10:35	2	340	1
Ernakulam Jn	ERS	11:40	11:43	3	414	1
Alleppey	ALLP	12:33	12:35	2	471	1
Kollam Jn	QLN	13:38	13:40	2	555	1
Trivandrum Central	TVC	15:05	—	—	619	1

Thiruvananthapuram Ctrl - Mangaluru Ctrl Vande Bharat Express (26660)
Station	Station Code	Arrival	Departure	Halt (min)	Distance (km)	Day
Trivandrum Central	TVC	—	16:05	—	—	1
Kollam Jn	QLN	16:53	16:55	2	65	1
Alleppey	ALLP	17:55	17:57	2	149	1
Ernakulam Jn	ERS	18:42	18:45	3	206	1
Thrissur	TCR	19:56	19:58	2	280	1
Shoranur Jn	SRR	20:30	20:32	2	313	1
Tirur	TIR	21:02	21:04	2	358	1
Kozhikode	CLT	21:32	21:34	2	399	1
Kannur	CAN	22:36	22:38	2	488	1
Kasaragod	KGQ	23:46	23:48	2	574	1
Mangalore Cntl	MAQ	00:45	—	—	619	2

== Gallery ==
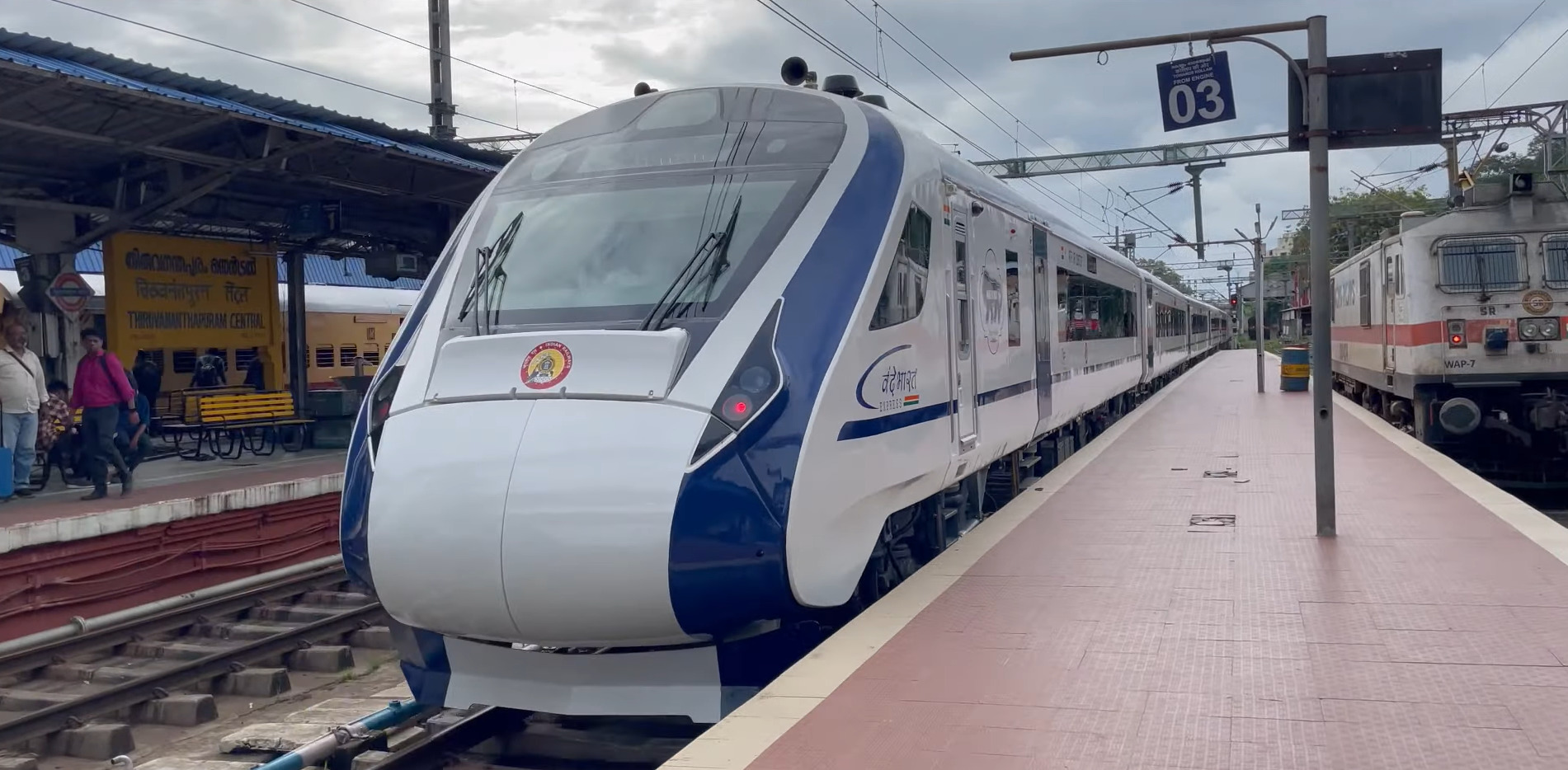
3rd Rake of this Mini Vande Bharat Express train

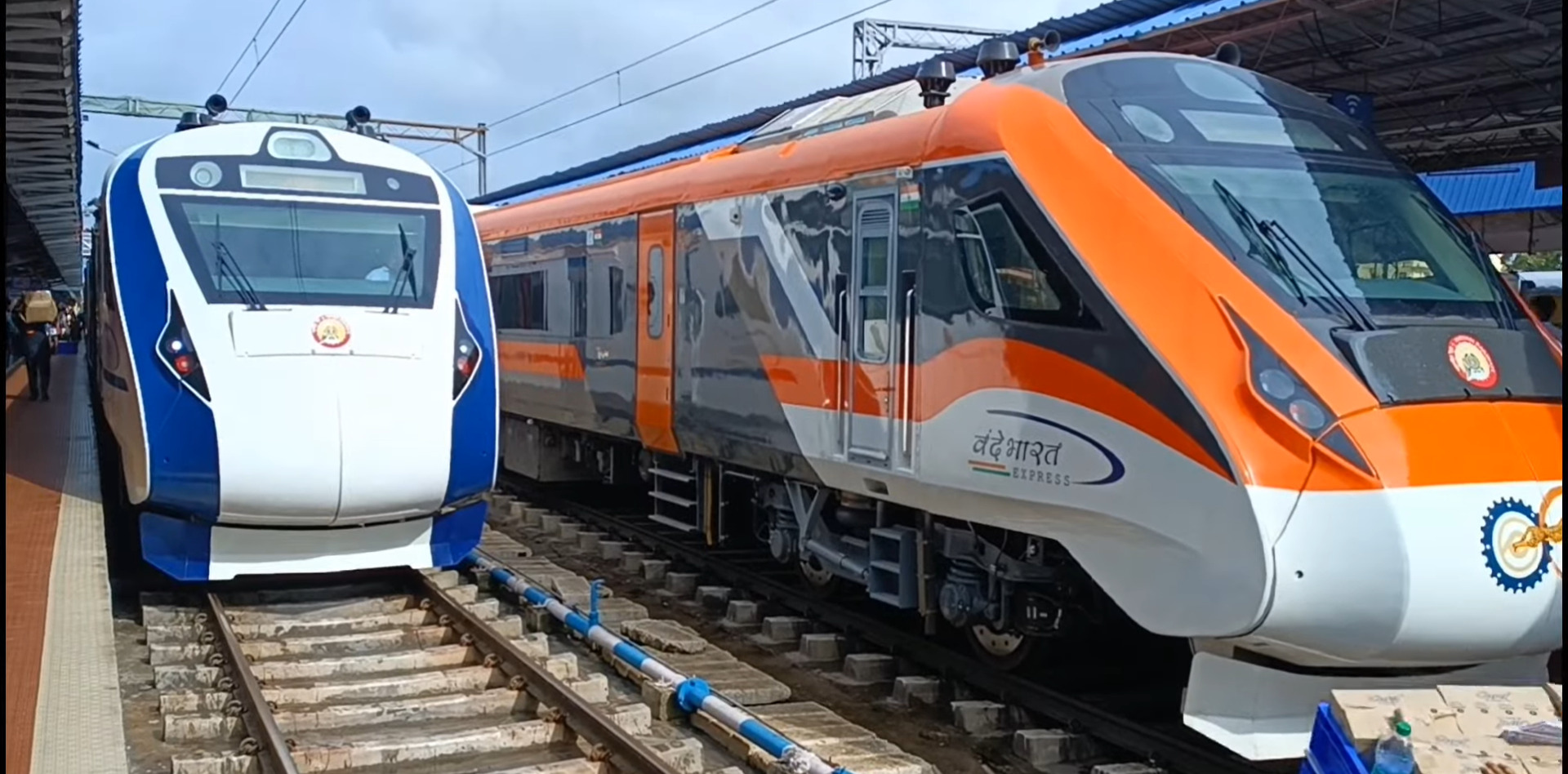
Dual Rakes of this Mini VB Express train

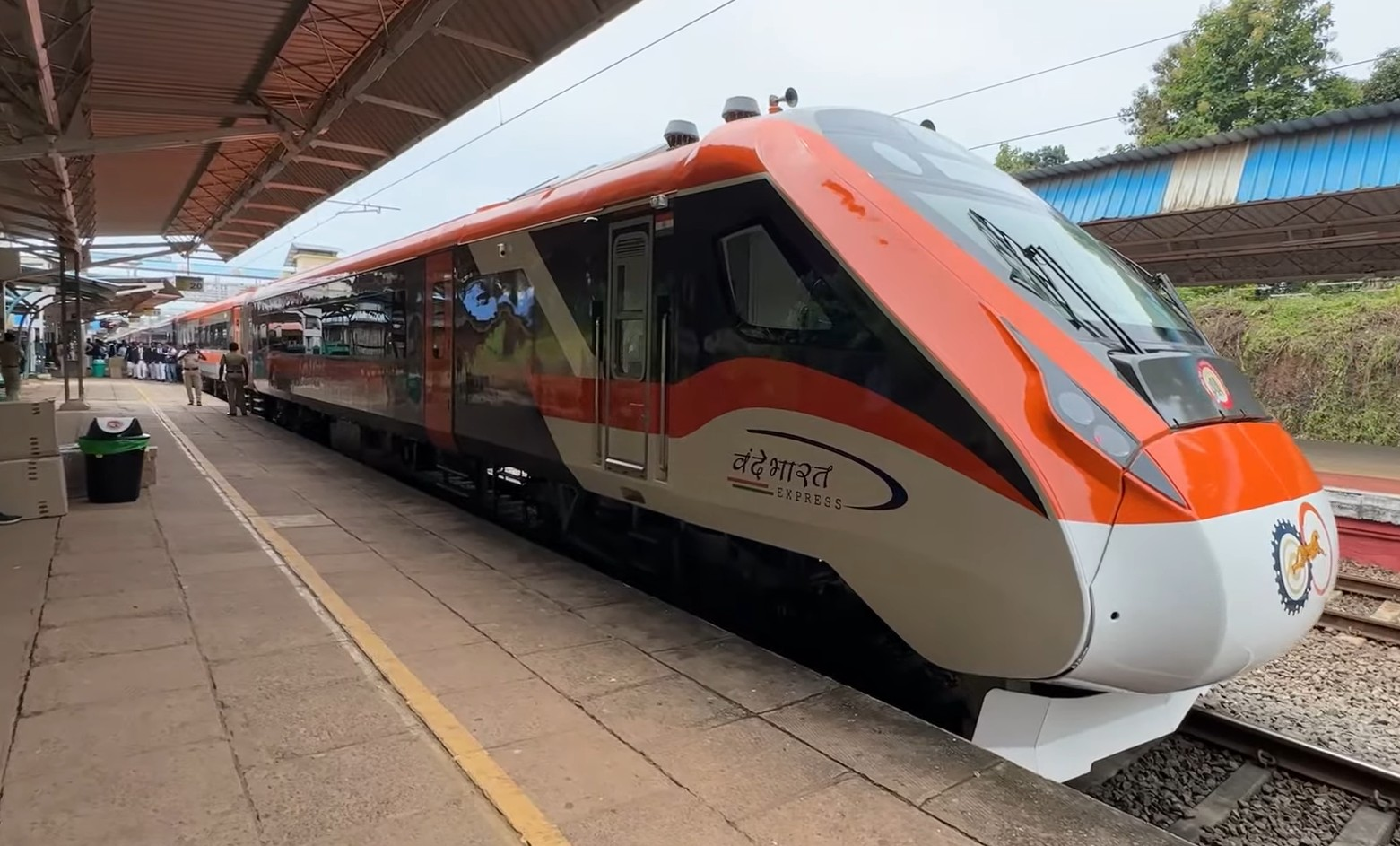
This Mini Vande Bharat Express train at Kasaragod railway station and getting ready for departure towards Trivandrum Ctrl

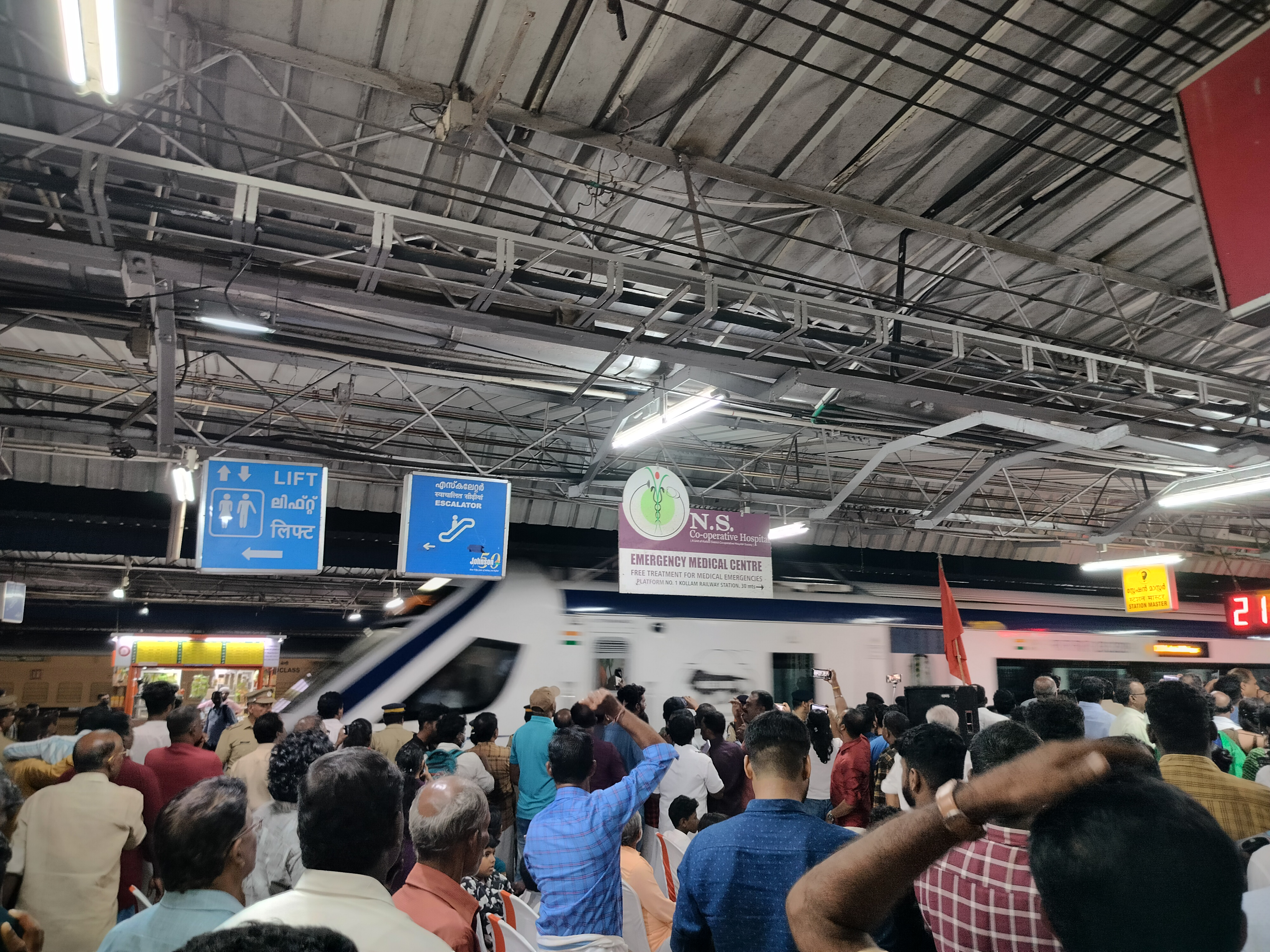
Crowd at Kollam Junction railway station on 24 September 2023 to welcome the second Vande Bharat Express allotted to Kerala

== See also ==
- Kasaragod–Thiruvananthapuram Vande Bharat Express
- KSR Bengaluru–Ernakulam Junction Vande Bharat Express
- Kannur–Thiruvananthapuram Jan Shatabdi Express
- Kozhikode–Thiruvananthapuram Jan Shatabdi Express
- Executive Express
- Mangalore Central railway station
- Thiruvananthapuram Central railway station
- Alappuzha railway station
