= Kasaragod - Thiruvananthapuram Vande Bharat Express =

Kasaragod - Thiruvananthapuram Vande Bharat Express may refer to

- Mangaluru Central–Thiruvananthapuram Vande Bharat Express
- Kasaragod–Thiruvananthapuram Vande Bharat Express
