= Ernakulam–Kannur Intercity Express =

Train in India

Intercity Express

Overview
- Service type: Express
- Current operator: Southern Railway zone

Route
- Termini: Ernakulam Junction; Kannur
- Stops: 15
- Distance travelled: 282 km (175 mi)
- Average journey time: 5 hours 50 mins
- Service frequency: daily
- Train number: 16305 / 16306

On-board services
- Classes: general unreserved, AC Chair car, Chair car
- Seating arrangements: Yes
- Sleeping arrangements: No
- Catering facilities: No

Technical
- Rolling stock: Standard Indian Railways Coaches
- Track gauge: 1,676 mm (5 ft 6 in)
- Operating speed: 48.5 km/h (30 mph)
Route map
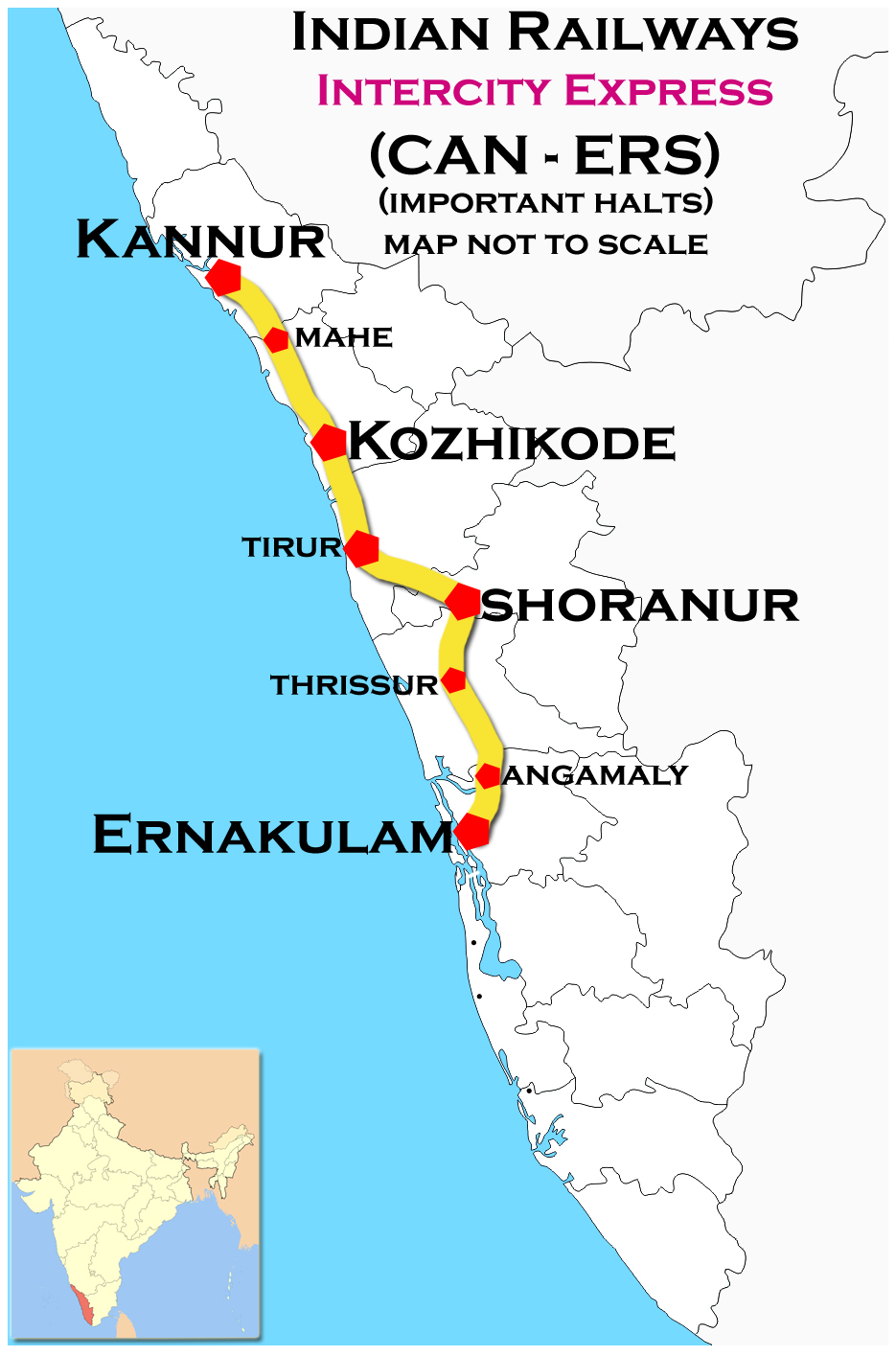

The 16305 / 06 Intercity Express is an Express train belonging to Indian Railways Southern Railway zone that runs between Ernakulam Junction and Kannur in India.

It operates as train number 16305 from Ernakulam Junction to Kannur and as train number 16306 in the reverse direction serving the states of Kerala.

== Coaches ==
The 16305 / 06 Intercity Express has one AC Chair car, two Chair car, 14 general unreserved & two SLR (seating with luggage rake) coaches . It does not carry a pantry car coach.

As is customary with most train services in India, coach composition may be amended at the discretion of Indian Railways depending on demand.

== Service ==
The 16305 Ernakulam Junction - Kannur Intercity Express covers the distance of 282 km (175 mi) in 5 hours 45 mins (49 km/h) and in 5 hours 55 mins as the 16306 Kannur - Ernakulam Junction Intercity Express (48 km/h).

As the average speed of the train is lower than 55 km/h (34 mph), as per railway rules, its fare does not include a Superfast surcharge.

== Routing ==
The 16305 / 06 Intercity Express runs from Ernakulam Junction via Thrissur, Shoranur Junction, Tirur, Kozhikode to Kannur.

== Stops ==
Thalassery, Mahe, Vadakara, Kozhikode, Parappanangadi, Tanur, Tirur, Kuttippuram, Shornur Junction, Thrissur, Irinjalakuda, Chalakkudy, Angamali, Aluva, Ernakulam Town (only for 16306)

== Traction ==
A Diesel loco Shed, Ernakulam based WDM-3A diesel locomotive used to pull the train for both directions. As the route is completely electrified now, Erode based WAP-4 pulls the train now.
