= Vekkalam =

- Village
- Location in Kerala, India Vekkalam (India)
- Coordinates: 11°52′0″N 75°43′0″E
- Country: India
- State: Kerala
- District: Kannur

Population (2011)
  - Total: 7,174

Languages
  - Official: Malayalam, English
- Time zone: UTC+5:30 (IST)
- PIN: 670650
- ISO 3166 code: IN-KL

Vekkalam is a village located in the Kannur district of Kerala, India.

== Demographics ==
As of 2011 census in India, Vekkalam had a total population of 7,174, including 3,473 males and 3,701 females.

== Governance ==
The village office is situated at Nedumpoil.

The Election Commission of India appointed five booth level officers. The officers are N. Rajan- Menachody School, Sumesh-Vayannur School, Sabu Joseph-GUPS Vekkalam, TD John Aided UP School Vekkalam Booth147 and Rajan -Aided UP School Vekkalam Booth-148.

== Schools ==
The four schools in Vekkalam are:

- Govt. UP School Vekkalam
- Palayad, Govt. LP School Vayannur
- Govt. UP School Menachody
- Aided UP School Vekkalam

== Religious sites ==
Christian churches include St.Jude's Church Kallumuthirakkunnu, Fathima Matha church Aryaparamba, India Pentecostal Church of God, St.Sebastian's Church Nedumpuramchal and Mar Gregorious Jacobite Church Varapedika.

Temples include Sri. Muthapan Madappura, Eerayikkolly, Chovva Kavu Vayannur, Vairi Ghathakan Temple, Vayannur and Koottakkalam Temple, Aryaparamba. The mosque in the village is Juma Masjid Perunthody.

== Infrastructure ==
The village has a 66 KV sub-station functioning under KSEB at Nedumpoil. Vijaya Bank is at Nedumpuramchal and Bank of India is in Perumthody.

Nedumpoil and Vayannur are the post offices.

== Transport ==
The national highway passes through Kannur town, connecting Mangalore and Mumbai on the northern side and Cochin and Thiruvananthapuram on the southern side. The road to the east of Iritty connects to Mysore and Bangalore. The nearest railway station is Kannur on the Mangalore-Palakkad line.
