= Kottakkuthazhe =

Kottakkuthazhe is in the Kannur district, Kerala, India; it is a small residential area in the middle of Kannur city.

== Transportation ==
The national highway passes through Kannur town. Mangalore and Mumbai can be accessed on the northern side and Cochin and Thiruvananthapuram can be accessed on the southern side. The road to the east of Iritty connects to Mysore and Bangalore. The nearest railway station is Kannur on Mangalore-Palakkad line. There are airports at Mangalore and Calicut.
