= Kozhikode railway station =

Railway station in Kerala, India

Kozhikode
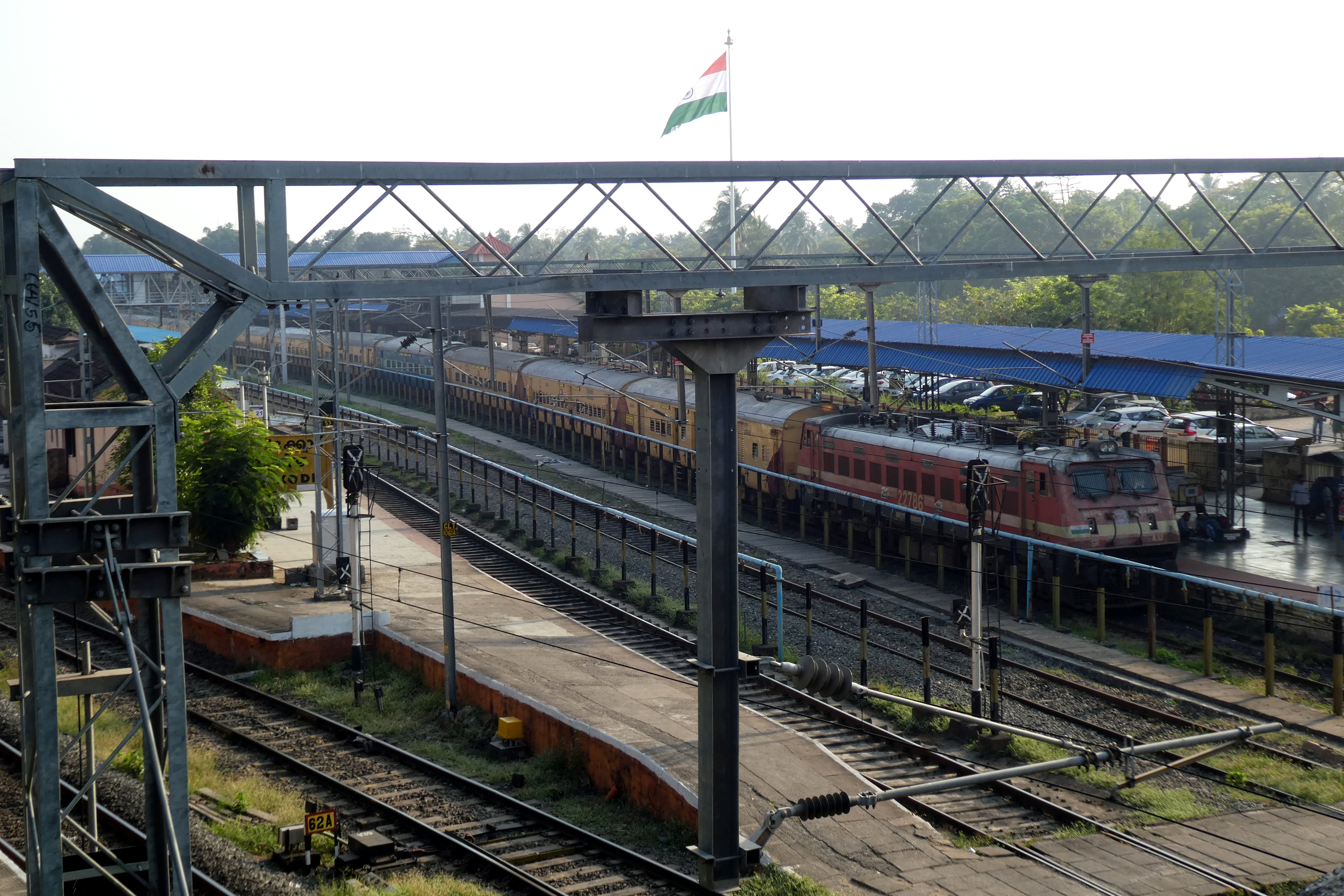

General information
- Other names: Kozhikode Main Railway Station
- Location: Railway Station Road, near Apsara Theatre, Kozhikode, Kerala, India
- Coordinates: 11.2465°N 75.7805°E
- Elevation: 11 m (36 ft)
- System: Express train and Passenger train station
- Owner: Indian Railways
- Operator: Southern Railway zone
- Line: Shoranur–Mangalore section
- Platforms: 4(1,2,3,4)
- Tracks: 6
- Connections: Bus stand, Taxicab stand, Auto rickshaw stand

Construction
- Structure type: Standard (on-ground station)
- Parking: Yes
- Accessible: Disabled access

Other information
- Status: Functioning
- Station code: CLT
- Zone(s): Southern Railway zone
- Division(s): Palakkad

History
- Opened: 2 January 1888; 138 years ago
- Former names: Calicut Railway Station

Passengers
- 2016–17: 28,463 per day
- Rank: 2 (in Kerala); 1 (in Palakkad division)
Location
- Interactive map

Kozhikode railway station (also known as Kozhikode Main railway station)(station code: CLT) is an NSG–2 category Indian railway station in Palakkad railway division of Southern Railway zone. It was given by Kallingal Madathil Rarichan Moopan to the British Indian Railways for a lease agreement of 99 years. It is one of the largest and major railway stations in the state of Kerala. At ₹200 crore (equivalent to ₹271 crore or US$29 million in 2026) in financial year 2018–19, it is the largest in terms of passenger revenue in the division. The station has four platforms, two terminals and a total number of six tracks. The first platform has a capacity to accommodate trains with 24 coaches and second & third platform has the capacity to accommodate 20 coaches; and the fourth one has the capacity to accommodate 24 coaches. It has a daily turnout exceeding 25,000 passengers. It is one of the major railway stations in Kerala with trains connecting the city to other major cities in India. The other railway stations in the city include Ferok, Kallayi Kozhikode South, Vellayil and West Hill.

An integrated security system was installed at the station in 2012 featuring baggage scanners, CCTVs and vehicle scanners. The 125th anniversary of the station was celebrated on 2 January 2013.

== History ==
The railway line to Kozhikode was opened to traffic on 2 January 1888 and at that time was western terminus of the Madras Railway. The first line in Kerala was laid between Tirur and Chaliyam, the former an important port town, back then. With the arrival of the new line to Calicut and its growth as an administrative centre, Chaliyam diminished in significance and the railway line to it was subsequently abandoned.

The station houses several vintage fixtures including a recreation club named the Railway Institute built by the British adjacent to the station in 1888 to serve as a venue for the social life of the Railways' employees, and a cast iron mechanical pump set that was imported from England to pump water into steam locomotives. The 125th anniversary of the station was celebrated on 2 January 2013. It has been ranked as "The Cleanest Railway Station of India" in January 2018 .

== Infrastructure ==
The station has four platforms and two terminals. The first platform has a capacity to accommodate trains with 24 coaches and the third platform 20 coaches. The fourth one has the capacity to accommodate 24 coaches. It heralds as the only A–1 graded station in Palakkad railway division with a daily turnout exceeding 25,000 passengers.

== Trains starting from Kozhikode ==
#	Train No.	Route	To	Distance	Remarks
1	12075/12076	Kozhikode–Thiruvananthapuram Jan Shatabdi Express	Thiruvananthapuram Central	400 km	
2	56602/56601	Kozhikode-Shornur Express	Shoranur Junction	86 km	
3	56617	Kozhikode-Kannur Express	Shoranur Junction	86 km	
4	56632	Kannur-Kozhikode Express	Kannur	89 km	
5	16511/16512	KSR bengaluru-Kozhikode Express	KSR Bengaluru	590 km	

== Major trains passing through Kozhikode ==
- Thiruvananthapuram-Kozhikode Jan Shatabdi Express
- Mangaluru Central–Thiruvananthapuram Vande Bharat Express (via Alappuzha)
- Kasaragod–Thiruvananthapuram Vande Bharat Express (via Kottayam)
- Hazrat Nizamuddin–Thiruvananthapuram Rajdhani Express
- Mangala Lakshadweep Express
- West Coast Superfast Express
- Malabar Express
- Maveli Express
- Parasuram Express
- Ernad Express
- Kannur–Thiruvananthapuram Jan Shatabdi Express
- Yesvantpur–Kannur Express
- Lokmanya Tilak Terminus–Ernakulam Duronto Express
- Ernakulam–H.Nizamuddin Duronto Express
- Kerala Sampark Kranti Express
- Kochuveli–Lokmanya Tilak Terminus Garib Rath Express
- Kochuveli–Mangaluru Junction Antyodaya Express
- Mangaluru–Coimbatore Intercity Express
- Nagercoil–Mangaluru Amrit Bharat Express
- Alleppey Executive Express
- Tirunelveli–Gandhidham Humsafar Express
- Rameswaram–Mangaluru Weekly Express

== Services ==
It is one of the major railway stations in Kerala with trains connecting the city to other major cities in India such as Ernakulam, Thiruvananthapuram, Chennai, Coimbatore, Madurai, Bangalore, Mangalore, New Delhi, Mumbai, Hyderabad, Ahmedabad, Kolkata, Surat, Pune, Jaipur, Visakhapatnam, Goa, and so forth. Other railway stations in the city include Ferok (code: FK), Kallayi Kozhikode South (code: KUL), Vellayil railway station (code: VLL) and West Hill railway station (code: WH).

== Facilities ==
An integrated security system was installed at the station in 2012 featuring baggage scanners, CCTVs and vehicle scanners.

- Reservation counters are open between 6:00 am to 8:00 pm
- Retirement Rooms (transit lodging facility)
- Cyber cafe
- Parcel booking Office
- Railway Mailing service (RMS) office
- Railway Protection Force – Circle office
- IRCTC Restaurants
- ATMs
- Pre-Paid autorickshaw counters
- Pre-paid parking space
- Escalator and elevator systems
- Battery operated car facility for disabled persons and senior citizens

== ATMs ==
The following bank-ATMs are available at the railway station:

- Indian Bank
- Indian Overseas Bank
- Canara Bank
- State Bank of India
- Punjab National Bank

== See also ==
- List of railway stations in Kerala
- Koyilandy railway station
