= Wagon tragedy =

1921 prisoner asphyxiation in British India

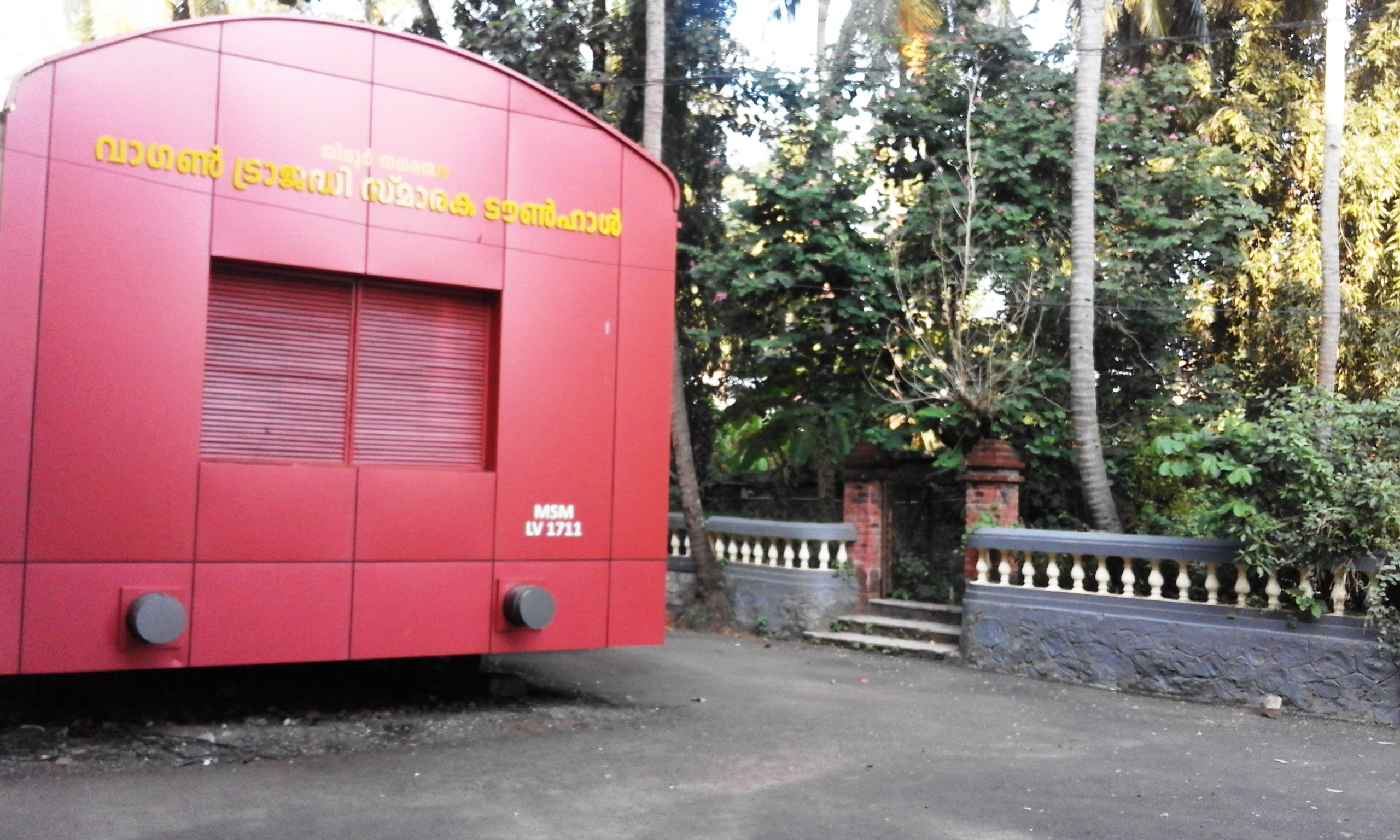
- A memorial to the wagon tragedy in Tirur

Details
- Date: 19 November 1921; 104 years ago
- Location: While in transit from Tirur to Podanur Junction, British India
- Country: British India
- Line: Shoranur–Mangalore section, Jolarpettai–Shoranur line
- Operator: Madras and Southern Mahratta Railway
- Incident type: Asphyxiation
- Cause: Overcrowding

Statistics
- Trains: Prisoner transport train
- Deaths: 70
- Injured: Unknown

The wagon tragedy, also known as wagon massacre, was an incident which occurred during the Malabar rebellion against British colonial rule in India that led to the deaths of 70 Indian prisoners. In 1921, a rebellion against British colonial rule by Mappila Muslims broke out in the Malabar District of British India. Following the rebellion, 100 Mappila prisoners who had been taken into custody were ordered by the colonial authorities to be transferred from the Malabar Coast to Podanur as the jails in the Malabar District were overcrowded. Thousands of Mappila prisoners were transported to other regions of British India during and after the rebellion via train, though they were typically transported in open-air carriages in order to prevent suffocation.

However, for unknown reasons, the 100 prisoners (who were being transported in November of that year) were sent to Podanur in a closed train carriage(Wagon 1711) by the sergeant and transport officer in charge of their detention and transfer. On 19 November, they were moved into the carriage and the train set off from Tirur Railway Station at 0715 pm, for Podanur. Air soon ran out in the carriage and several prisoners began to die due to asphyxiation. By the time the train arrived at the Podanur Junction railway station at 1230 am on 20 November, the carriage was opened by local authorities, who discovered that 64 prisoners had died.

The 36 surviving prisoners were taken to a nearby hospital, where a further six died of their injuries, bringing the total death toll up to 70. A prisoner later described his experiences on the train while it was in transit: "we were perspiring profusely and we realized that air was insufficient and we could not breathe. We were so thirsty that some of us licked the perspiration from our clothes. I saw something like gauze over the door with very small holes so that no air could come in. Some of us tried to put it away but we were not strong enough."

When news of the incident came out, there was a public outcry in British India at the colonial authorities over their perceived negligence. Several prominent Muslims dispatched telegraphs to British colonial officials in Delhi, including the Earl of Cromer, who demanded an investigation. The British responded by opening an inquiry into the deaths, which eventually found the carriage manufacturer, transport officer and sergeant negligent in sending the prisoners to Podanur in a closed carriage instead of an open-air one but they were all acquitted. The incident ultimately contributed to an increase in support for the Indian independence movement. A memorial to the incident was subsequently constructed at Tirur.

== See also ==
- Khilafat Movement
- Patharighat massacre
- Non-cooperation movement
- History of India
