= Kannur–Thiruvananthapuram Jan Shatabdi Express =

Train in India

Thiruvananthapuram Central - Kannur Jan Shatabdi Express
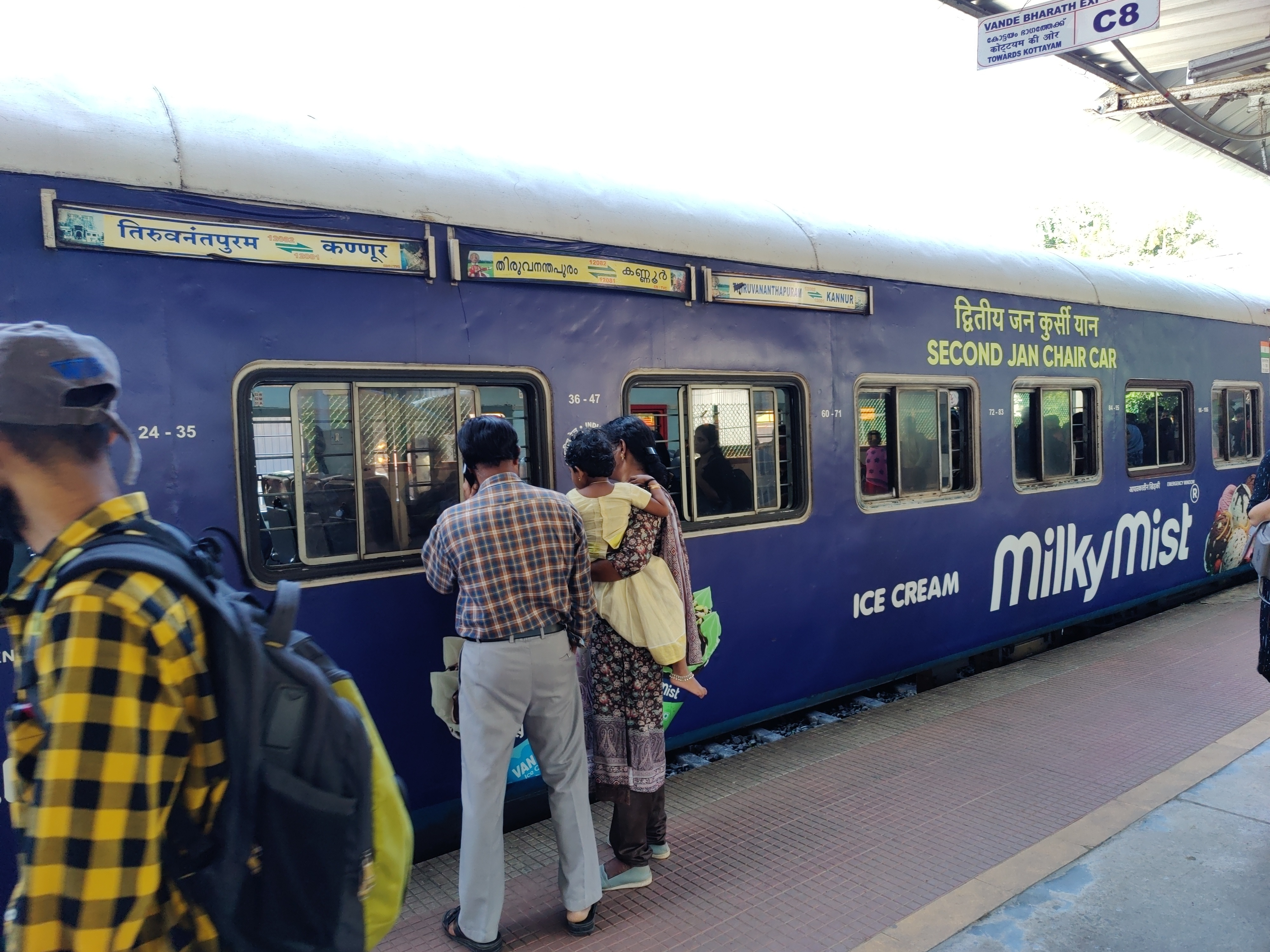
- Kannur - Trivandrum Jan Shatabdi Express at Ernakulam Town railway station.

Overview
- Service type: Jan Shatabdi Express
- Locale: Kerala
- First service: 20 January 2011; 15 years ago (Inaugural run between CLT and TVC); 2 August 2013; 13 years ago (Extn. to CAN)
- Current operator: Southern Railway

Route
- Termini: Kannur (CAN); Thiruvananthapuram Central (TVC)
- Stops: 13
- Distance travelled: 500 km (310 mi)
- Average journey time: 9 hours 35 minutes
- Service frequency: 5 days a week (Note: Except Sundays and Wednesdays for 12081 and Tuesdays and Saturdays for 12082)
- Train number: 12081 / 12082

On-board services
- Classes: AC Chair Car, Second Class Seating General Unreserved
- Seating arrangements: Yes
- Sleeping arrangements: No
- Auto-rack arrangements: Overhead racks
- Catering facilities: On-board catering, E-catering
- Observation facilities: Large windows
- Baggage facilities: Available
- Other facilities: Below the seats

Technical
- Rolling stock: LHB coach
- Track gauge: 1,676 mm (5 ft 6 in)
- Operating speed: 54 km/h (34 mph) average including halts.
Route map
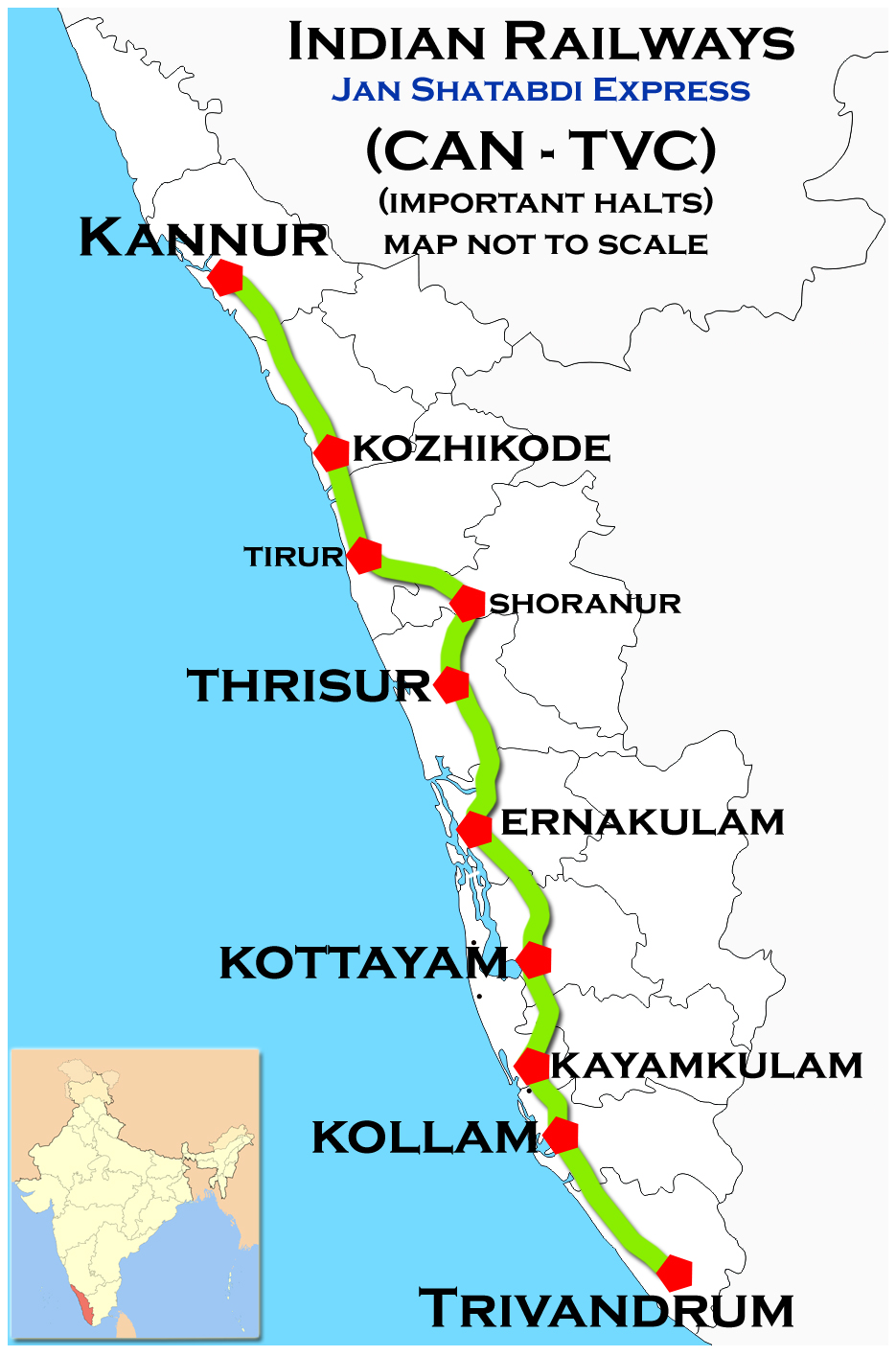
↓ 12081 • 12082 ↑

The 12081 / 12082 Kannur-Thiruvananthapuram Central Jan Shatabdi Express is a Jan Shatabdi Express train belonging to Trivandrum Division of Southern Railway zone of Indian Railways that runs between Thiruvananthapuram Central and Kannur in Kerala state of India. It is the longest-running Jan Shatabdi Express of Southern Railway and the fourth longest Jan Shatabdi Express in India.

== History ==
Initially it ran between Thiruvananthapuram and Kozhikode, but owing to public demand it was extended to Kannur in 2013.

The train is one of the most popular commuter trains in Kerala state along with its counterpart, the 12075/76 Calicut Jan Shatabdi Express, which runs via Alappuzha.

== Route ==
Kannur Jan Shatabdi Express covers the distance of 500 km between Thiruvananthapuram and Kannur in about 9½ hours, making it one of the fastest trains between the two cities. It has 13 halts and the stoppages are at Thalassery, Vadakara, Kozhikode, Tirur, Shoranur Junction, Thrissur, Ernakulam Town, Kottayam, Tiruvalla, Chengannur, Mavelikkara, Kayamkulam Jn, Kollam Junction and Thiruvananthapuram

== Coach composition ==
The train operates with 20 LHB coaches, which include 15 chair cars, three AC chair cars, and two brake vans. The train was upgraded with new LHB coaches from October 16, 2024.
