= Kasaragod railway station =

Railway station in Kerala, India

Kasaragod

General information
- Location: Theruvath, Kasaragod, Kerala; India
- Coordinates: 12.4913°N 74.9877°E
- System: Indian Railways station
- Owner: Indian Railways
- Operator: Southern Railways
- Line: Shoranur–Mangalore section
- Platforms: 3
- Tracks: 3
- Connections: Bus stand, Taxicab stand, Auto rickshaw stand

Construction
- Structure type: Standard (on ground station)
- Parking: Yes
- Accessible: Disabled access

Other information
- Status: Functioning
- Station code: KGQ
- Zone(s): Southern Railway zone
- Division(s): Palakkad

Passengers
- 6,511 per day
Route map
- Sources
Location
- Location within India Location within Kerala

Kasaragod railway station (station code: KGQ) is an NSG–3 category Indian railway station in Palakkad railway division of Southern Railway zone. It is a major railway station serving Kasaragod in the Kasaragod District, state of Kerala. In the 2025-26 fiscal year, Kasaragod railway station recorded ₹48.12 crore in passenger revenue.

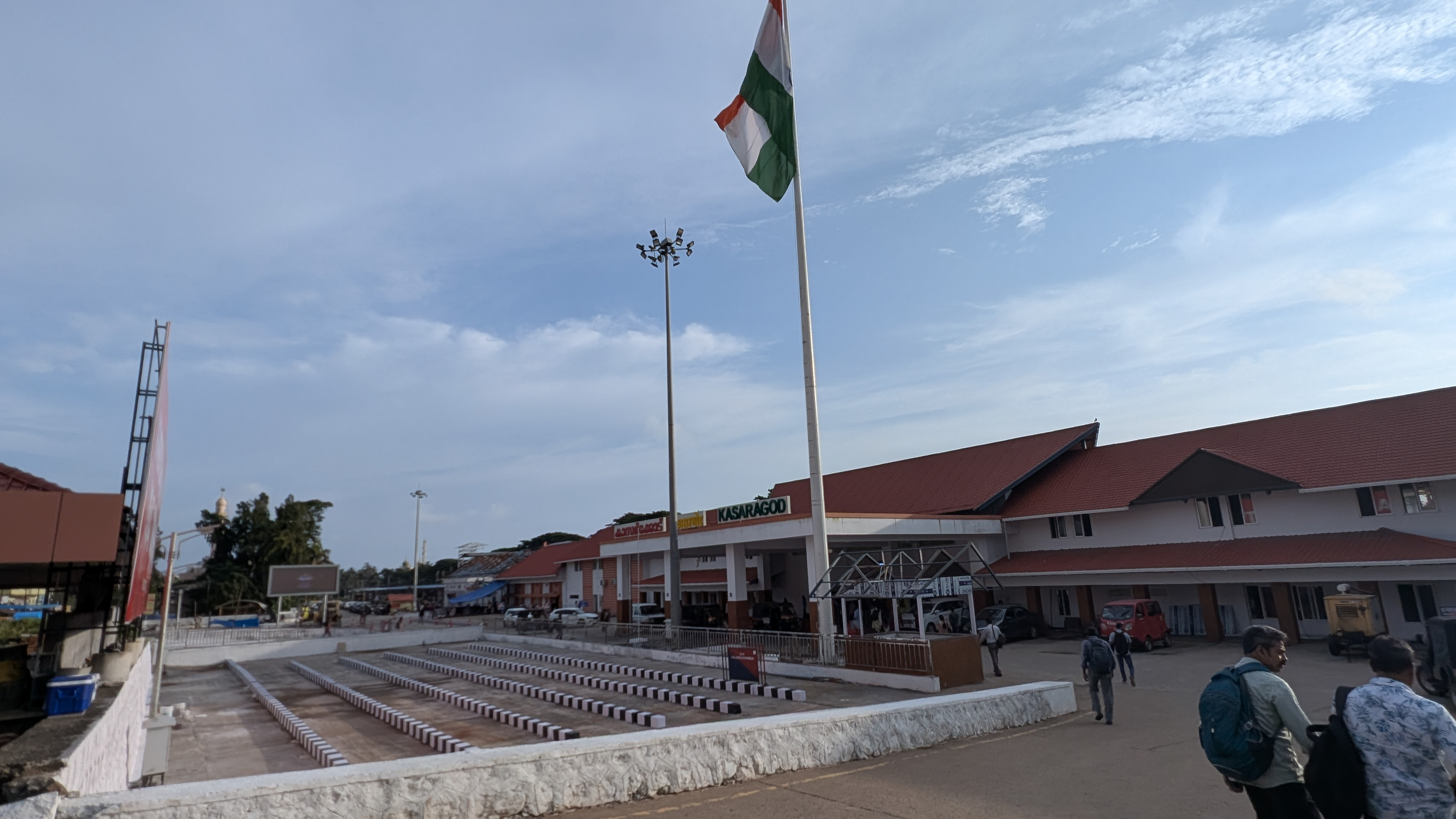
Kasaragod railway station- front view

== Line ==
It lies in the Shoranur - Mangalore Section of the Southern Railway zone and is the first major stop for trains departing from Mangalore Central towards Kerala.

== Infrastructure ==
The station has three platforms and three tracks.

Since the station was built in 1898, Kasaragod was a prime destination due to its easy access to the nearest fort Bekalfort.

== Services ==
Thiruvananthapuram Vande Bharat Express (via Kottayam) originates from this station. The Mangaluru Central–Thiruvananthapuram Vande Bharat Express (via Alappuzha) had been originating from Kasaragod, later, it got extended to Mangaluru. 57 trains pass through the station with a majority that serve it.
