= Ullal railway station =

Railway station in Karnataka, India

Ullal
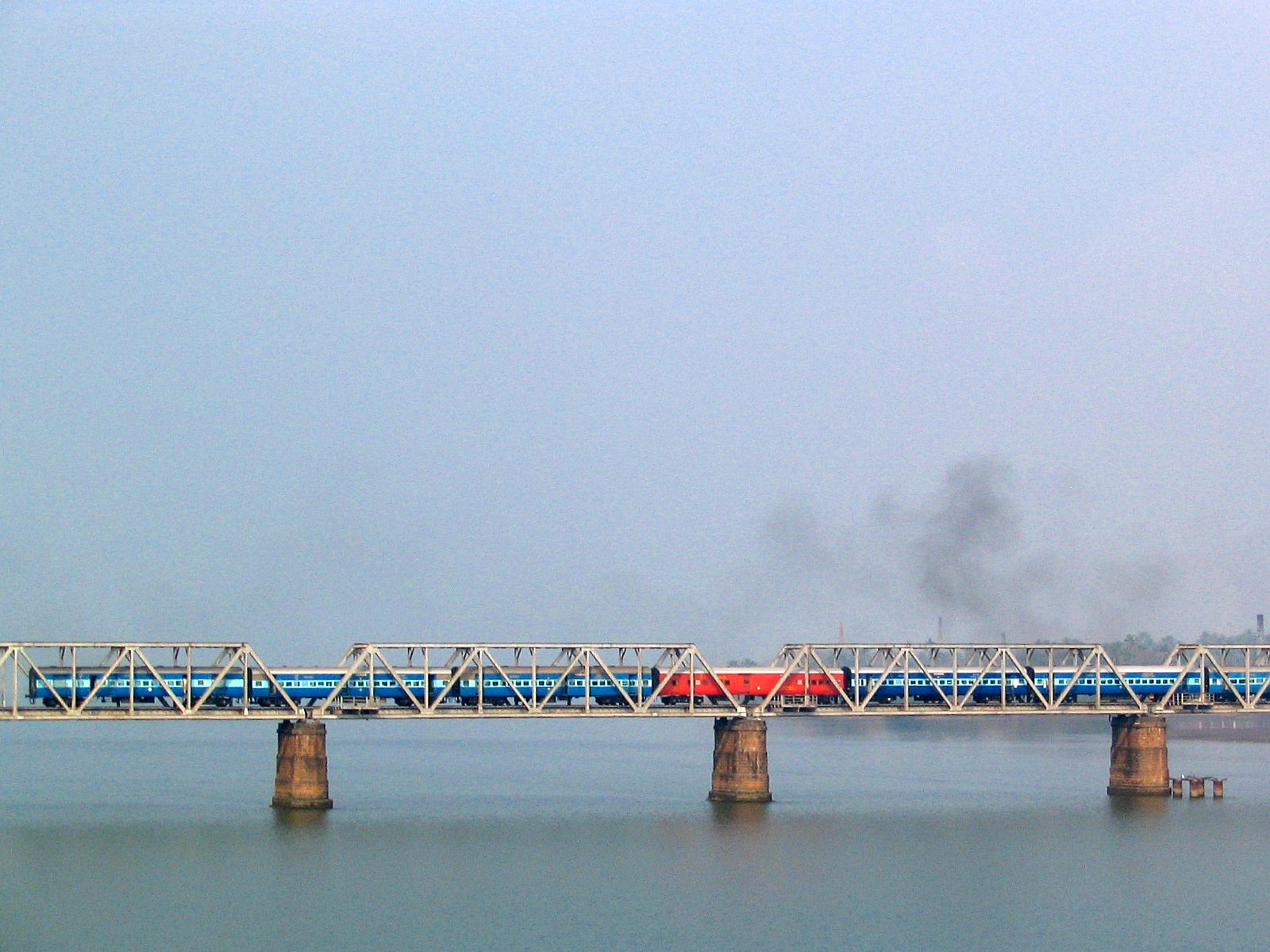
- Ullal Bridge

General information
- Location: India
- Coordinates: 12.7923°N 74.8549°E
- System: Regional rail station
- Platforms: 3
- Tracks: 5
- Connections: Bus stand, Taxicab stand, Auto rickshaw stand

Construction
- Structure type: Standard (on ground station)
- Parking: Yes

Other information
- Status: Functioning
- Station code
- Zone(s): South Western Railway zone
- Division(s): Mysuru
Route map
- Sources
Location

Ullal railway station (station code: ULL) is an NSG–4 category Indian railway station in Mysore railway division of South Western Railway zone. which was transferred from Palakkad division of Southern Railway zone with effective from 1 October 2026 along with Mangaluru Central (MAQ), Mangaluru Junction (MAJN) railway stations. It is a railway station serving the region of Ullal, Mangalore in the Dakshina Kannada District of Karnataka, India. It lies to the south of Mangalore city and in the Shoranur–Mangalore section of the Southern Railways. Trains halting at the station connect the region to prominent cities in India such as Thiruvananthapuram, Kochi, Chennai, Kollam, Bangalore, Kozhikode, Coimbatore, Mysore and so forth.

== See also ==
- List of railway stations in India
