= Kozhikode–Thiruvananthapuram Jan Shatabdi Express =

Jan Shatabdi Express train in India

Thiruvananthapuram Central - Kozhikode Jan Shatabdi Express
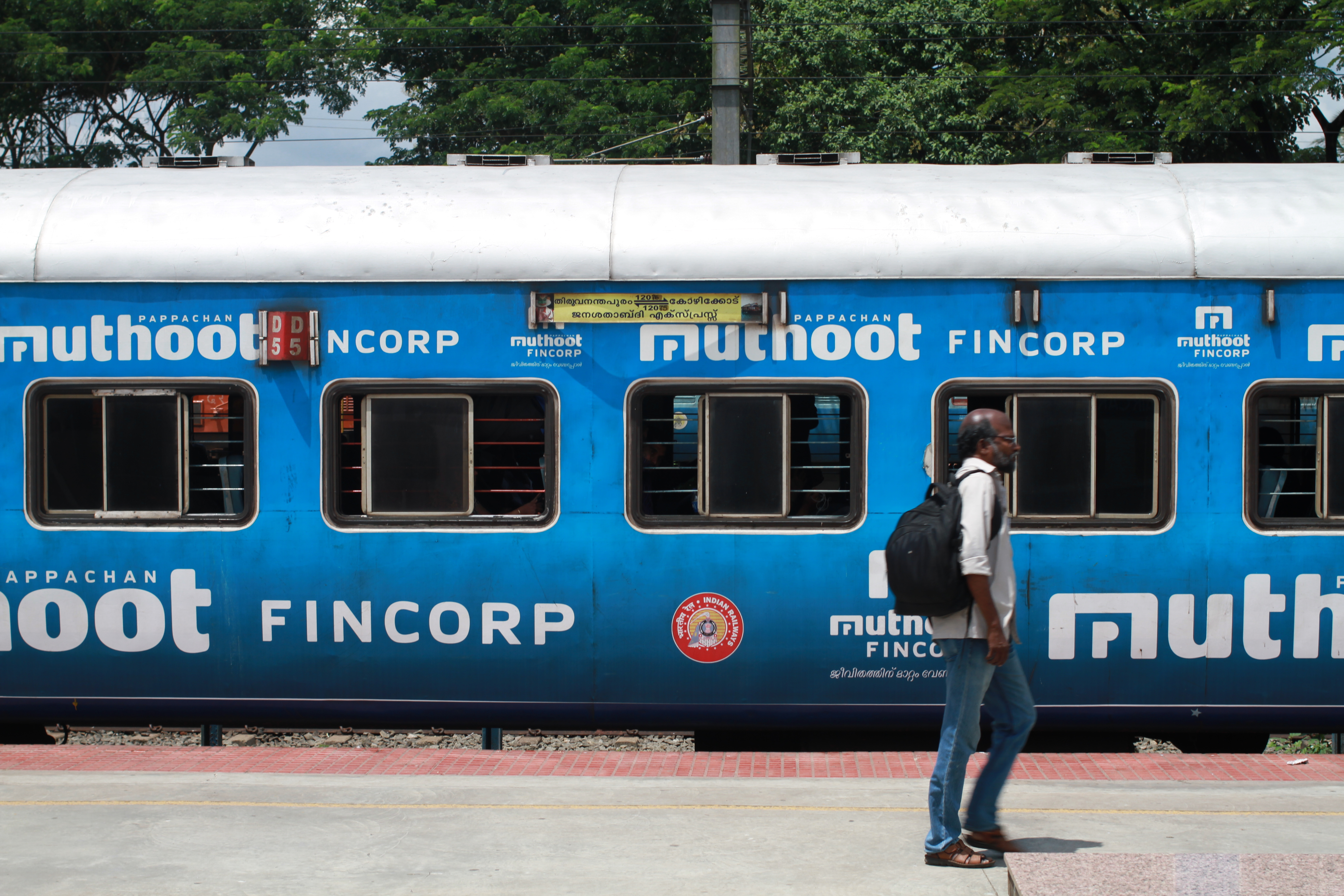

Overview
- Service type: Jan Shatabdi Express
- Locale: Kerala
- First service: 1 November 2002; 23 years ago (Inaugural run between ERS and TVC); 14 August 2009; 17 years ago (Extn. to CLT)
- Current operator: Southern Railways (SR)

Route
- Termini: Kozhikode (CLT); Thiruvananthapuram Central (TVC)
- Stops: 12
- Distance travelled: 399 km (248 mi)
- Average journey time: 6 hours 55 minutes
- Service frequency: Daily service
- Train number: 12075 / 12076

On-board services
- Classes: AC Chair Car, 2nd Class sitting (Non AC Chair Car)
- Seating arrangements: Open coach
- Sleeping arrangements: No
- Catering facilities: Yes
- Baggage facilities: Overhead racks

Technical
- Rolling stock: Standard Indian Railways coaches
- Track gauge: 1,676 mm (5 ft 6 in)
- Operating speed: 58 km/h (36 mph)
Route map
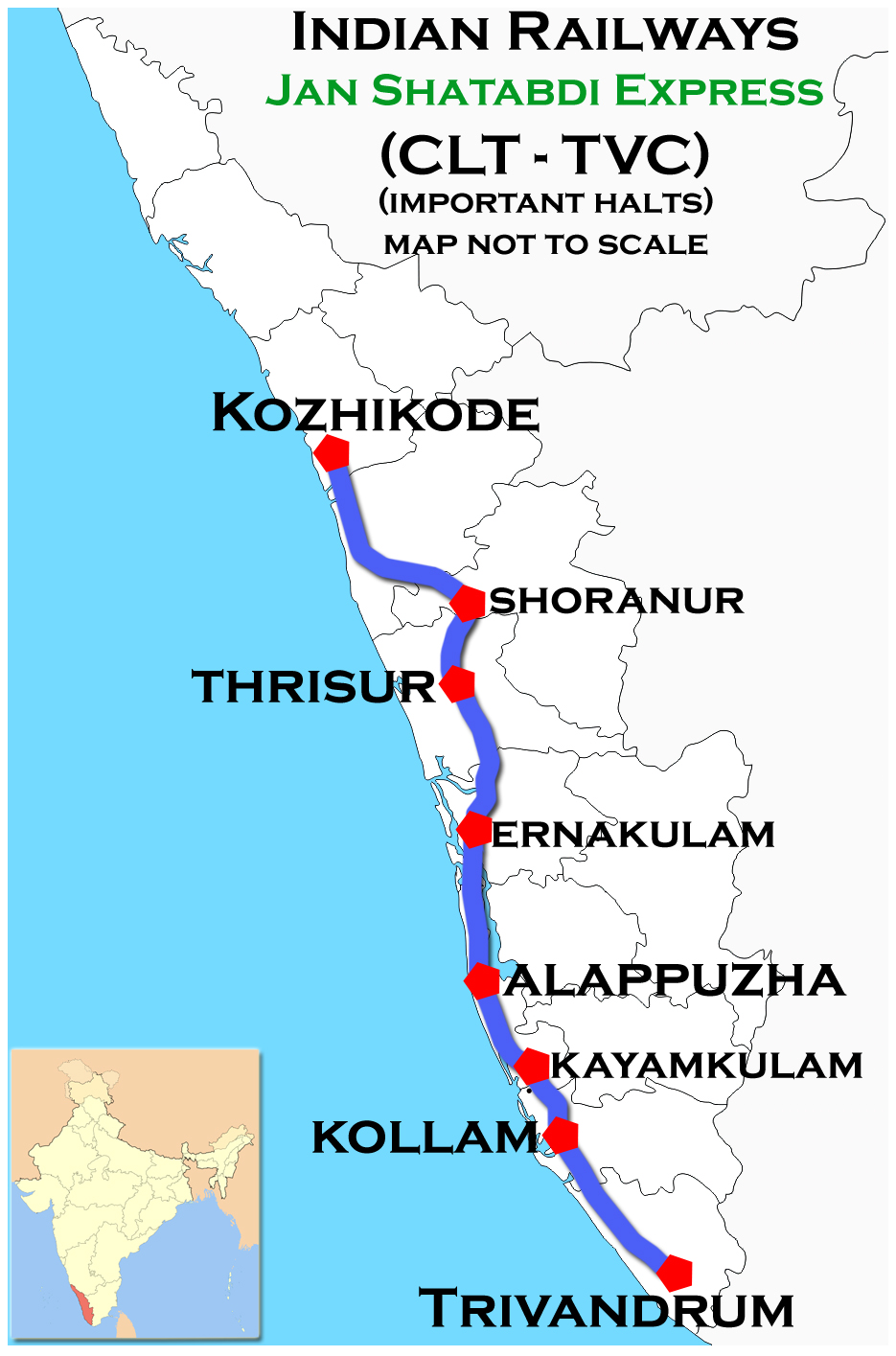
↓ 12075 • 12076 ↑

The 12075/12076 Thiruvananthapuram - Kozhikode Jan Shatabdi SF Express is a daily running Jan Shatabdi Superfast Express train belonging to Thiruvananthapuram Division of Southern Railway zone of Indian Railways that runs between Thiruvananthapuram Central and Kozhikode stations in Kerala state of India. It clocks a maximum of 110km/h during its journey.

== Name of the train ==
Jan Shatabdi Express is a more affordable variety of the Shatabdi Express, which has both AC and non-AC accommodation. The word 'Jan' refers to common people.

== Route ==
The train was initially running between Thiruvananthapuram Central and Ernakulam Junction via Alappuzha. The train was extended to Kozhikode on 14 August 2009. The train halts at 12 stations.

== Coach composition ==
The train has 18 second class seating coaches named D1-D17 (including 2 SLRs- SL1 and SL2) and 3 AC Chair car coaches.

== Traction ==
Both trains are hauled by an Erode(ED) based WAP-7. Earlier it used to be hauled by an Ernakulam based WDM-3A between CLT and SRR and an Erode/Arakkonam based WAP-4/WAP-1 for rest of the journey

== See also ==
- Kannur Jan Shatabdi Express
- Jan Shatabdi Express
- Indian Railways
