= Vallikkunnu railway station =

Railway station in Kerala, India

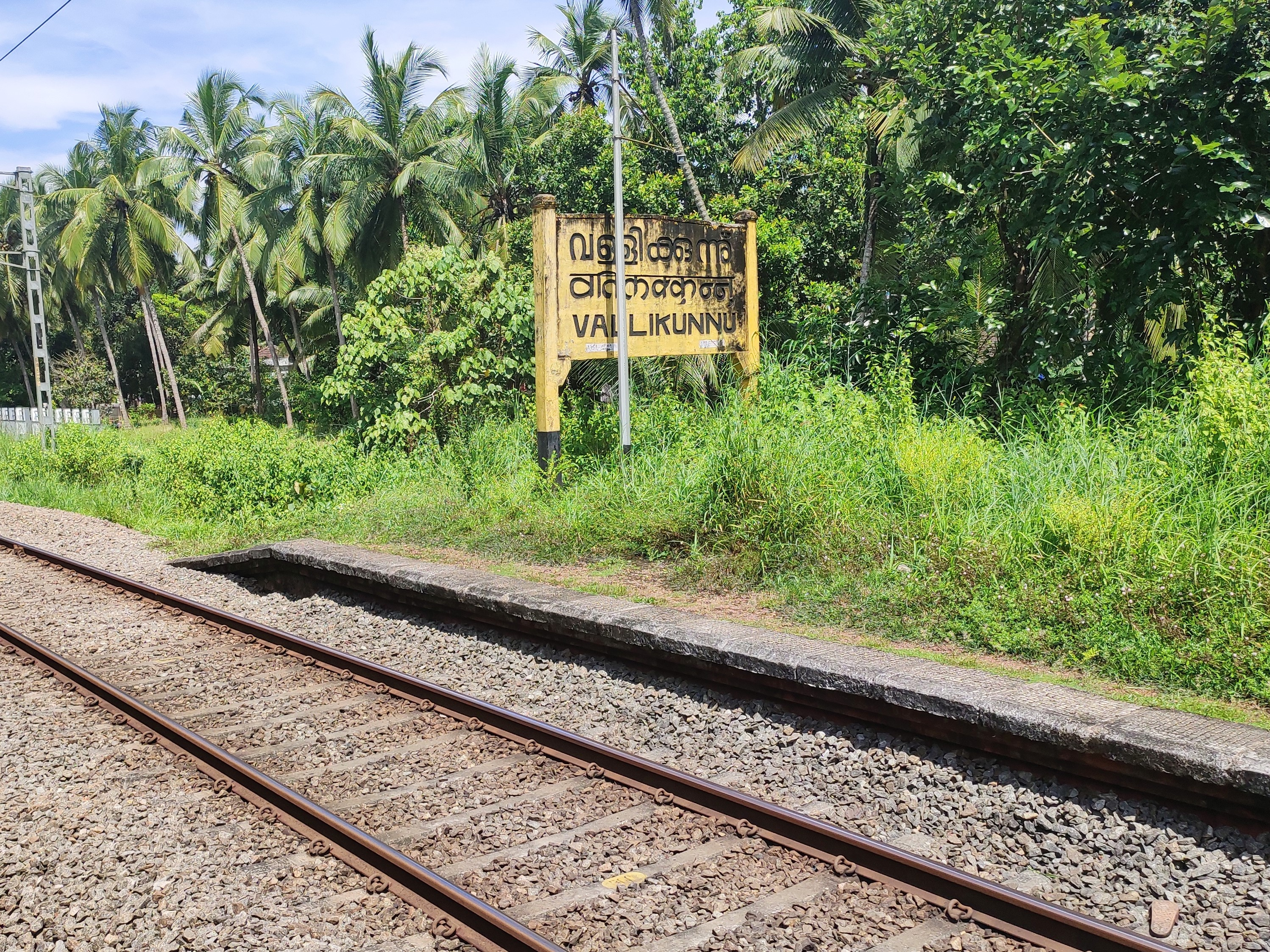
- Vallikkunnu Railway Station

General information
- Coordinates: 11.0924°N 75.8511°E
- System: Indian railway station
- Owner: Indian Railways

Other information
- Station code: VLI
- Fare zone: Southern Railway
Location
- Location within India Location within Kerala

Vallikkunnu railway station (station code: VLI) is an NSG–6 category Indian railway station in Palakkad railway division of Southern Railway zone. It is situated at Ariyallur, Vallikkunnu, Malappuram district, Kerala, India. It is one of the oldest railway stations in Kerala. This railway station was a part of first rail route (Tirur-Chaliyam) in Kerala. The station code for Vallikkunnu set by Indian Railway is VLI which can be used for various purposes including online reservations.
