= Shoranur–Mangalore section =

Railway segment of IR

Shoranur–Ullal section
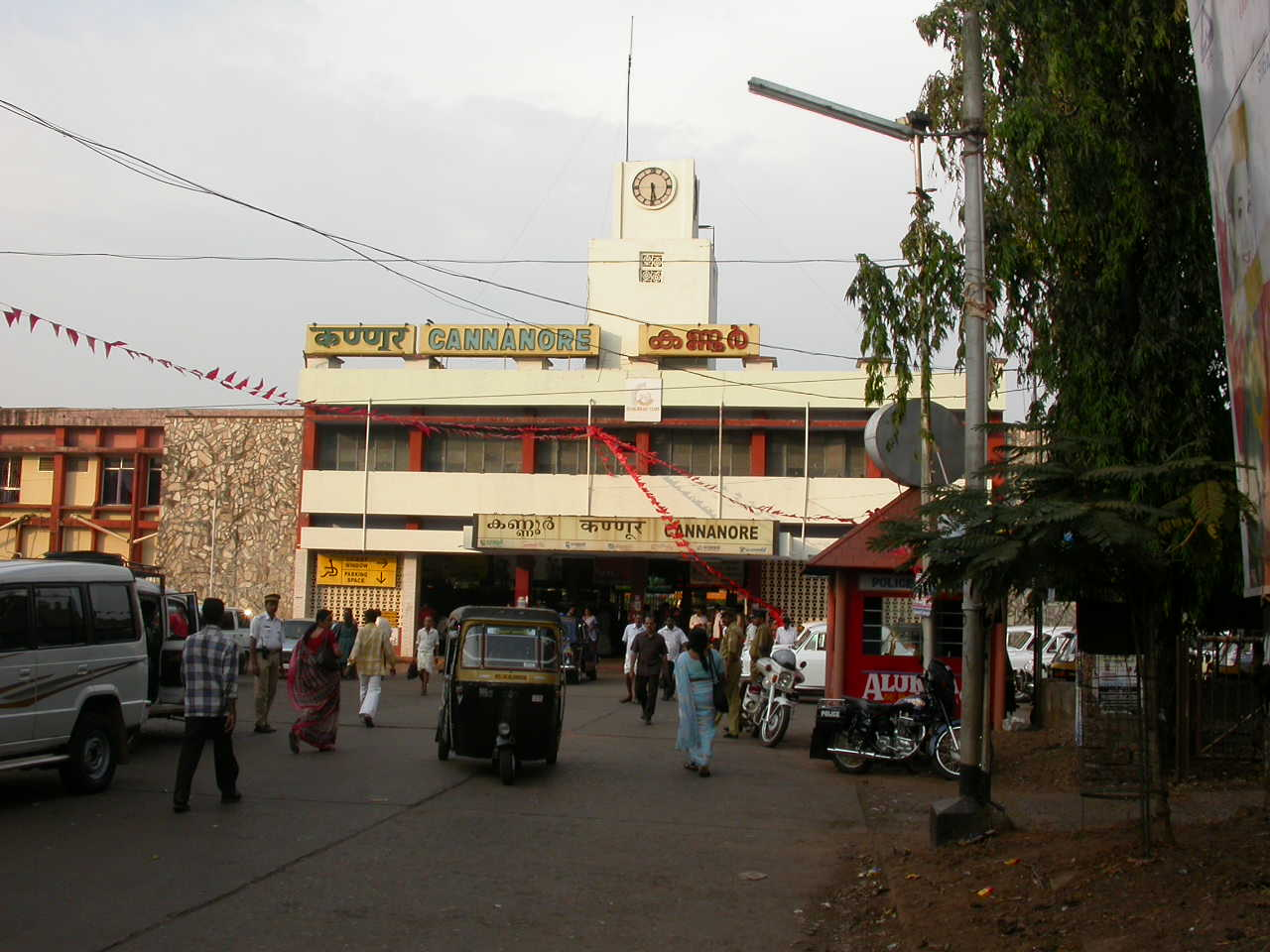
- A view of Kannur Railway Station.

Overview
- Status: Operational
- Owner: Indian Railways
- Locale: Palakkad, Malappuram, Kozhikode, Kannur, Kasaragod and Dakshina Kannada
- Termini: Shoranur Junction; Ullal railway station excl
- Stations: 40+

Service
- Type: Regional rail
- Operator: Palakkad Railway Division of Southern Railway zone

History
- Opened: 1907

Technical
- Line length: 328 km (203.81 mi)
- Track length: 328 km (203.81 mi)
- Number of tracks: 2
- Track gauge: 1,676 mm (5 ft 6 in)
- Electrification: 25 kV AC 50 Hz
- Operating speed: 110 km/h (68 mph)

The Shoranur–Ullal section, also known as Shoranur–Ullal section, is a railway segment of IR functioning under Palakkad Division of Southern Railway Zone. This is a 5 ft 6 in (1,676 mm) broad gauge electrified line which begins at the Shornur Junction railway station in Kerala and ends at some distance before Ullala railway station just before Karnataka Kerala border. This line passes through major towns including Tirur, Kozhikode, Vatakara, Thalassery, Kannur, Payyannur, Kanhangad and Kasaragod.

This line covers entire Districts of Malabar region in Kerala except Wayanad district.

The Shoranur–Mangalore(excl) section is a strategic route and the lifeline of Malabar's economy that interconnects the important cities of this regions and also serves as a threshold to Tulu Nadu, Konkan and Mumbai from Kerala.

== History ==
This railway line came into existence through South West line of Madras Railway a private colonial rail enterprise that existed in British Raj.

The first section of this line was established between Tirur and Beypore on 12 March 1861 and this line was 30.5 km (19 miles) long. This happens to be the first railway line in present-day Kerala.

This line was subsequently extended 14.5 km till Kuttippuram on 1 May 1861 and from there till Pattambi for a distance of 37 km on 23 September 1862 so as to link with 105 km long Pattambi - Podanur section which got commissioned on 14 April 1862. On 2 January 1888 the rail head at Beypore was abolished and line was extended to Kozhikode via Ferok. The line was further extended till Mangalore in phases by 1907. On 31 August 1956 this entire section came under Palakkad railway division.

In 1998, following the opening of Konkan railways, many trains like Thiruvananthapuram Rajdhani Express, Marusagar Express etc. were routed through this section.

In 2014, this section got completely converted to double line traffic and by 2017 entire section got completely electrified. On 25 April 2023, Prime Minister of India Narendra Modi flagged of the first Vande Bharat Express through this route between Thiruvananthapuram and Kasaragod.

== Accidents ==
- 1921 November 19 - Wagon tragedy
- 1986 February 28 - Thalassery train disaster that claimed 26 lives during Jagannath Temple festival.
- 2001 June 21 - Kadalundi train derailment
- 2023 April 2 - Elathur train attack

== See also ==
- Shoranur–Cochin Harbour section
- Nilambur–Shoranur line
- Jolarpettai–Shoranur line
- Palakkad–Pollachi line
- Mangalore–Hassan–Mysore line
- Guruvayur–Thrissur spur line
