= Kannur railway station =

Railway station in Kerala, India

Kannur (Cannanore)
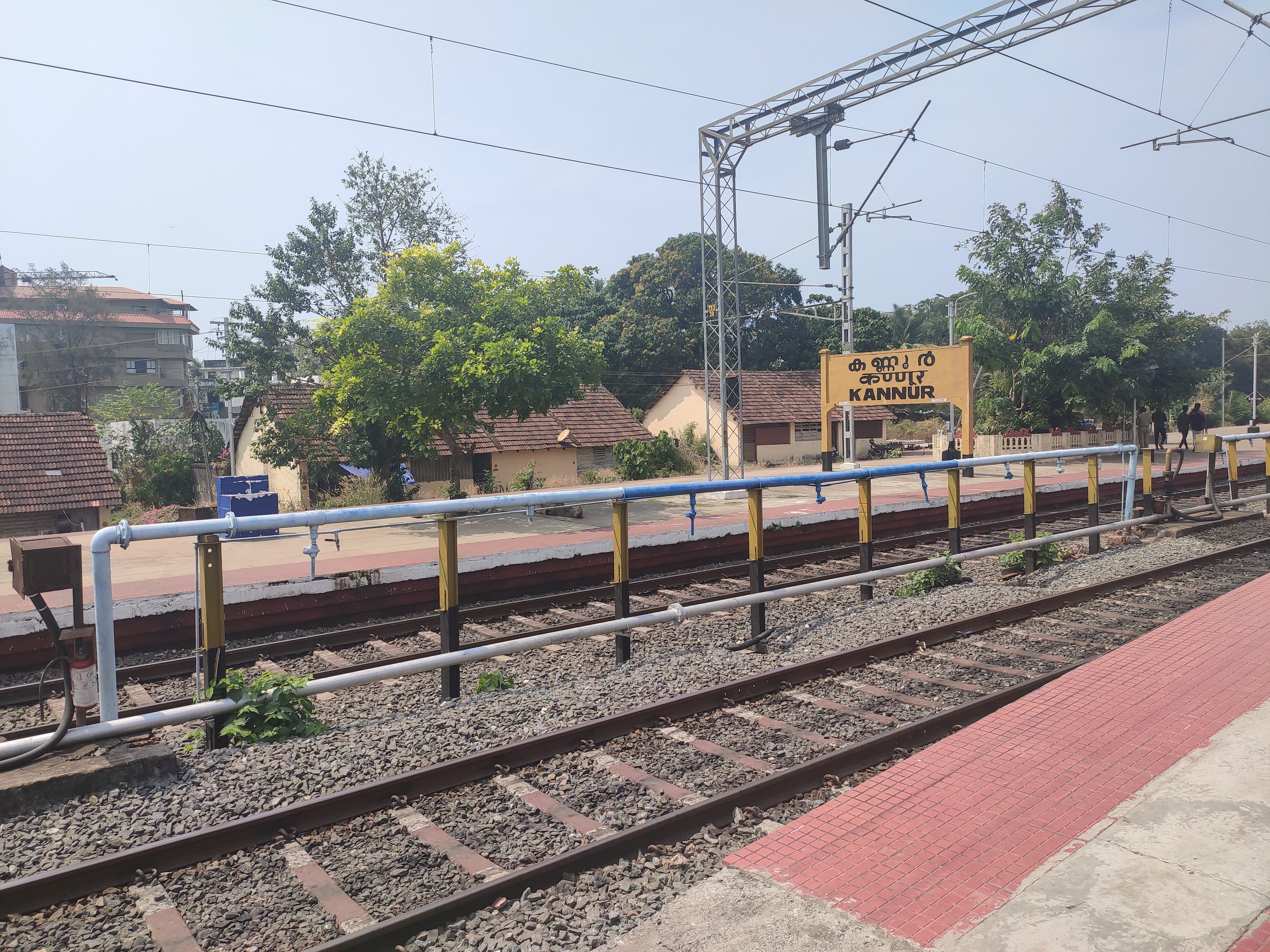
- Kannur Railway Station nameboard on platform

General information
- Location: Kannur, Kerala, PIN-670 001; India
- Coordinates: 11.8689°N 75.3555°E
- Elevation: 16 metres (52 ft)
- System: Indian Railways station
- Owner: Indian Railways
- Operator: Southern Railway zone
- Line: 2
- Platforms: 4 (1A, 1, 2 & 3)
- Tracks: 10
- Connections: Taxi Stand, Auto Service, Kannur Central Terminal Bus Stand

Construction
- Structure type: Standard (on-ground station)
- Parking: Yes
- Accessible: Disabled access

Other information
- Status: Functioning
- Station code: CAN
- Zone(s): Southern Railway zone
- Division(s): Palakkad
- Classification: NSG – 2

History
- Opened: 1907; 119 years ago
- Electrified: Yes, 25 kV AC 50 Hz
- Former names: Cannanore

Passengers
- 2018–19: 19,867 per day
- Rank: 5 (in Kerala); 2 (in Palakkad division)
Route map
- Sources
Location

Rm non referenced claims. Its in the Southern Railways. In Kerala State.

Kannur railway station (formerly Cannanore railway station)(station code: CAN) is an NSG–2 category Indian railway station in Palakkad railway division of Southern Railway zone. It is the largest railway station serving the City of Kannur in Kerala. It lies in the Shoranur–Mangalore section of the Southern Railway zone. At ₹136.11 crore (US$14 million) in financial year 2025–26, it is the sixth largest in terms of passenger revenues in Kerala, and second largest under Palakkad railway division. Almost all major trains connecting the other parts of Kerala, Tamil Nadu, Andhra Pradesh and North India halt here. Kannur and Kannur South (Station Code: CS) are two different stations which serve Kannur city.

== Infrastructure ==
Kannur Railway Station has four platforms, namely Platform No.1, 1A, 2 and 3 and two entrances. Another platform has been proposed to be constructed on the Eastern Entrance side. The Platform number 1 of the Kannur Railway Station is the second longest railway platform in the state of Kerala. The railway station has lift and escalator facilities, as well as a subway facility to cross platform. The station is also equipped with free wireless internet access facility, and prepaid auto stand.

== Location ==
Kannur Railway Station is located just 1 km from both Central Bus Terminal, Kannur at Thavakkara which is Kerala's biggest bus terminal and Old Bus Stand, Kannur respectively, and 2 km from KSRTC bus depot at Caltex Junction (on NH-66) and 1.5 km from City Bus Stand near the District HQ Hospital. Kannur International Airport is just 27 km from the railway station.

== Important trains ==
- Mangaluru Central–Thiruvananthapuram Vande Bharat Express (via Alappuzha)
- Kasaragod–Thiruvananthapuram Vande Bharat Express (via Kottayam)
- Janshatabdi express
- Rajdhani express
- Kerala Sampark Kranti express
- Mangala Lakshadweep express
- Garibrath express
- Netravati express
- Parasuram Express
- Ernakulam Intercity express
- Coimbatore Intercity sf express
- Ernad express
- Malabar express
- Maveli express
- Humsafar express
- Vivek express
- Marusagar express
- Poorna express
- Chennai sf Mail
- West Coast sf express
- Chennai sf express
- Link express
- Alleppey Executive Express
- Manglore–Trivandrum express
- Yeswantpur express via Salem
- Bengaluru City express via Manglore
- Manglore–Kacheguda express
- Okha–Ernakulam express
- Gandhidam–Nagercoil express
- Veraval–Trivandrum express
- Bikaner –Kochuveli express
- Bhavnagar–Kochuveli express
- Dehradun–Kochuveli sf express
- Amritsar–Kochuveli sf express
- LTT–Kochuveli sf express
- Nizamuddin–Trivandrum sf express

=== Trains starting from Kannur ===
- Kannur–Kozhikode Express
- Kannur–Mangaluru Central Passenger (Unreserved)
- Kannur–Shoranur Passenger
- Kannur–Cheruvathoor Passenger
- Kannur–Coimbatore Express
- Kannur - Shoranur MEMU
- Kannur - Alappuzha Executive
- Kannur–Thrissur Express
- Kannur–Thiruvananthapuram Central Jan Shatabdi Express
- Kannur–Ernakulam Intercity Express
- Kannur–Yeshwantpur Express (Via Shornur Junction)
- Kannur - KSR Bengaluru Express (Via Mangaluru)

== Gallery ==
Kannur Railway Station

== See also ==
- Southern Railway zone
- Indian Railways
- Thalassery
- Kannur
