= Tirur railway station =

Railway station in Kerala, India

Tirur
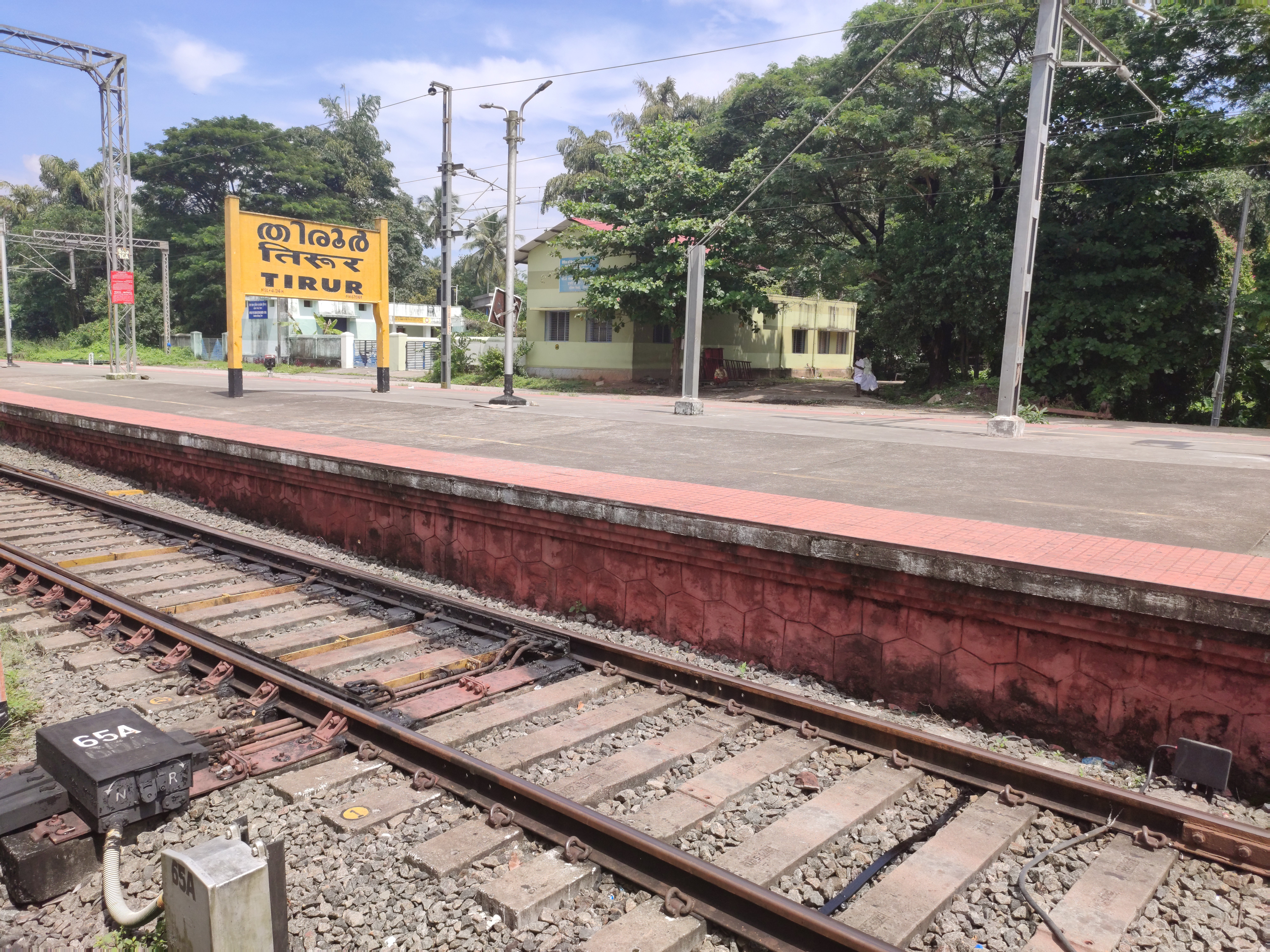
- തിരൂർ

General information
- Location: R.S Road Tirur, Tirur, Malappuram, Kerala; India
- Coordinates: 10.918°N 75.922°E
- Elevation: 9 metres (30 ft)
- System: Express train and Passenger train station
- Owner: Indian Railways
- Operator: Southern Railway
- Line: Shoranur–Mangalore section
- Platforms: 3
- Tracks: 4
- Connections: Bus stand, Taxicab stand, Auto rickshaw stand

Construction
- Structure type: Standard (on ground station)
- Parking: Yes, on both sides

Other information
- Status: Functioning
- Station code: TIR
- Zone(s): Southern Railway zone
- Division(s): Palakkad

History
- Opened: 1861; 165 years ago
Route map
Location
- Location within India Location within Kerala

Tirur railway station (station code: TIR) is an NSG–3 category Indian railway station in Palakkad railway division of Southern Railway zone. It is the oldest railway station in Kerala. It is a major railway station serving the town of Tirur in Malappuram district of Kerala. It lies in the Shoranur–Mangalore section of the Southern Railway zone. The station has three platforms and four tracks. Though no trains originate from this station, trains halting at the station connect the town to prominent cities in India such as Thiruvananthapuram, Kochi, Kozhikode, Kollam, Thrissur, Kannur, Chennai, Mumbai, Bangalore, Coimbatore, Pondicherry, New Delhi, Mangalore, Chandigarh, Pune, Jaipur, Jammu Tawi, Okha, Ahmedabad, Kolkata and so on. This is an "A" class railway station which earns more than 30 crore per annum. It has now been upgraded to a Model Railway Station (Adarsh). The first railway line in Kerala was commissioned on 12 March 1861 from Beypore to Tirur . The proposed high-speed rail has a stop in Tirur. The new rear entrance and parking area are being set up on the eastern side of the station, opening to Tirur Market.

== History ==
The history of railways in Kerala traces back to Tirur. Tirur Railway station is the oldest station in the state. The stations at Tanur, Parappanangadi, and Vallikkunnu also form parts of the oldest railway line in the state laid from Tirur to Beypore. The line started functioning on 12 March 1861. In the same year, it was extended from Tirur to Kuttippuram via Tirunavaya. Later, it was further extended from Kuttippuram to Pattambi in 1862, and was again extended from Pattambi to Podanur in the same year. The current Chennai-Mangalore railway line was later formed as an extension of the Beypore - Podanur line thus constructed.

The historical Wagon tragedy of 1921 was happened in a wagon from Tirur to Podanur.

== Incidents ==
- Wagon tragedy

== Major Trains passing through Tirur ==
- Mangaluru Central–Thiruvananthapuram Vande Bharat Express (via Alappuzha)

== Upcoming facilities ==
New platform and ticket counter, 4 lifts and expansion of foot overbridge . The work is almost over.

== See also ==
- Tirunnavaya railway station
- Wagon tragedy
- Mangalore Mail
- Tirur
- Malappuram
- Malappuram district
- Transportation in Malappuram district
- vairankode vela
