= Shoranur Junction railway station =

Railway station in Kerala, India

Shoranur Junction SHORNUR JUNCTION
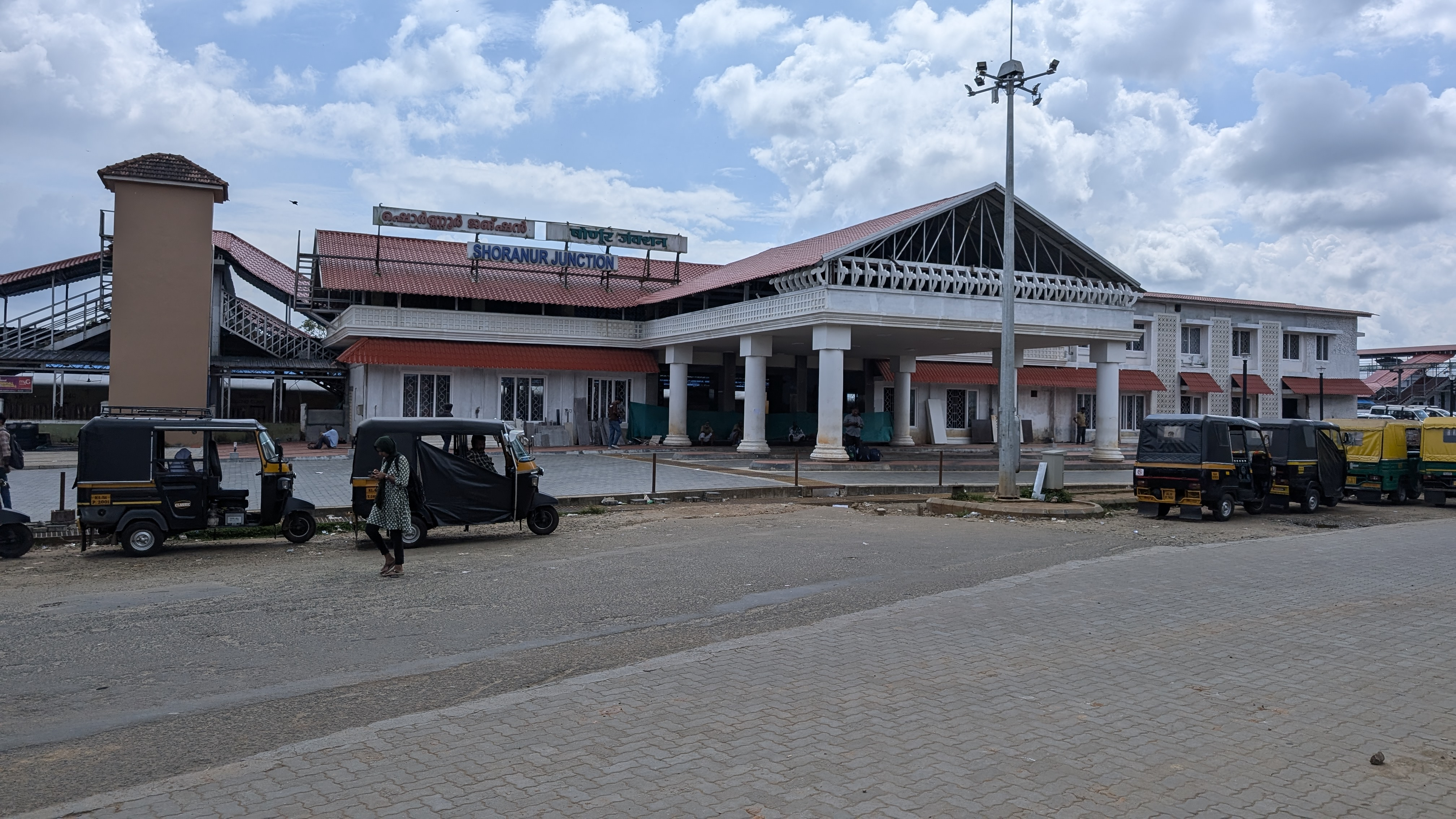
- Shoranur Junction railway station

General information
- Location: Shoranur, Kerala; India
- Coordinates: 10.759°N 76.271°E
- Elevation: 29 m (95 ft)
- System: Indian Railways station
- Owner: Indian Railways
- Operator: Southern Railway zone
- Lines: Shoranur–Cochin Harbour section Nilambur–Shoranur railway line Shoranur–Mangalore section Jolarpettai–Shoranur line
- Platforms: 7
- Tracks: 14
- Connections: Taxi Stand, Auto Service, Shoranur Bus Stand

Construction
- Structure type: Standard (on-ground station)
- Parking: Available
- Accessible: Disabled access

Other information
- Status: Functioning
- Station code: SRR
- Zone(s): Southern Railway zone
- Division(s): Palakkad
- Fare zone: SOUTHERN RAILWAY
- Classification: NSG – 3; Class 'A'

History
- Opened: April 14, 1862; 164 years ago
- Closed: 2nd September 2022
- Rebuilt: 31st March 2025
- Former names: -

Passengers
- 2018-19: 90,132 per day
- Rank: 5 (in Palakkad division)
Route map
Location
- Location within India Location within Kerala

Shoranur Junction (station code: SRR) is an NSG–3 category Indian railway station in Palakkad railway division of Southern Railway zone. It is the railway station located at Shoranur, Palakkad District, Kerala. It comes under the Palakkad Railway Division of the Southern Railway. It is the largest railway station in the state of Kerala in terms of area. It is an important junction because it is the point at which the line from Chennai via Jolarpettai, Erode and Palakkad meets the coastal line from Mangalore to Kanyakumari. Further, Shoranur junction is the node from which a separate Branch line goes to the town of Nilambur, about 66 km to the north. The Nilambur–Shoranur line, which connects two tiny hill-towns, is one of the most picturesque in India.

== Introduction ==
The station is situated at the junction of four major railway lines – the Nilambur line from the north, Palakkad line from the east, Kanyakumari line from the south and Mangalore line from the North-west. Being the entry point into the Malabar region from the rest of the state, Shoranur is often referred as the gateway to Malabar. It comes under the Palakkad Railway Division of the Southern Railway. Shoranur is the second railway station in Kerala after Trivandrum Central railway station to introduce Clean train station activity, whereby trains stopping at the station for more than 15 minutes would be subjected to mechanized cleaning and garbage removal. Lifts from platforms has also been proposed. As a pilot project She toilet has also been introduced. A baby care unit was opened in Ladies waiting Hall on PF .2/3

== History ==
The history of Shoranur railway station dates back to the 19th century when the railways first made inroads into Malabar. Tirur railway station was the oldest station in the state. The stations at Tanur, Parappanangadi, and Vallikkunnu also form parts of the oldest railway line in the state laid from Tirur to Beypore (Kozhikode). The line started functioning on March 12, 1861. In the same year, it was extended from Tirur to Kuttippuram via Tirunavaya. Later, it was further extended from Kuttippuram to Pattambi in 1862, and was again extended from Pattambi to Podanur in the same year. The current Chennai-Mangalore railway line was later formed as an extension of the Beypore - Podanur line thus constructed. The Shoranur Junction Railway Station became operational with the opening of Pattambi–Podanur line on 14 April 1862. The importance of the station increased with the opening of the Shoranur–Eranakulam line in 1902. The final addition to the railway infrastructure of Shoranur came with the opening of Nilambur road line in 1927. The presence of Palakkad Gap makes the accessibility from Southwestern coast of India (Mangalore) to southeastern coast (Chennai) easier.

== Layout ==
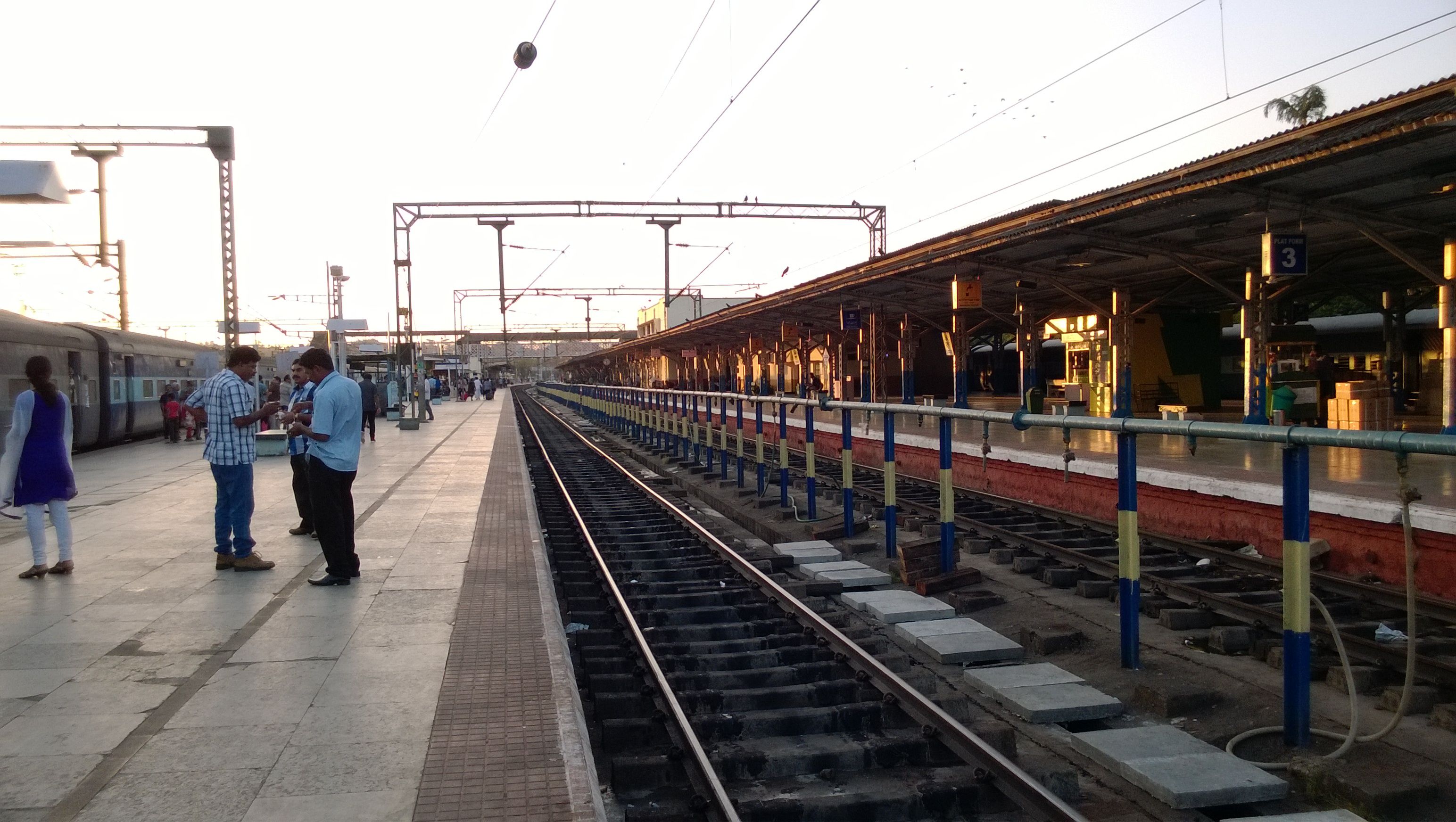

There are 7 platforms at the station for handling long and short-distance trains. platforms 1, 2 and 3 mainly handle passenger trains originating from the station, while platforms 4, 5, 6 and 7 cater to long-distance express trains. There is only a single terminal which is located towards the northern side of the station. As part of setting up of automatic signalling system between Ernakulam and Shoranur railway stations, the yard of the station will be remodelled in such a way that all 7 platforms will be able to dispatch and receive trains simultaneously. The Palakkad-Shoranur line and the Thrissur-Shoranur are doubletracked while the Nilambur line is single tracked .All lines from the station have been electrified.

== Location ==
The station is located on the Shoranur ring road. The Shoranur Municipal Bus Stand located 500 m away, provides bus services to Ottapalam, Thrissur, Pattambi, Cherpulassery, Chelakkara, Mannarkkad, Perinthalmanna and Kunnamkulam. The second Municipal stand at Kulappully, located 2 km from the station, handles bus services to Palakkad, Guruvayur, Ponnani and Valanchery.

== Major trains halting at Shornur Junction ==
- Kasaragod–Thiruvananthapuram Vande Bharat Express (via Kottayam)
- Mangaluru Central–Thiruvananthapuram Vande Bharat Express (via Alappuzha)
- Chennai Central - Mangalore Central West coast Superfast Express
- Mangalore Central - Chennai Superfast mail

And 75 + Trains from Trivandrum Side, Konkan railway

== Triangular station ==
There is a long-standing demand for an Island station along the link line that bye passes the Shoranur Junction railway station 1 km to the east. Construction of such a station is expected to help the passengers from Malabar access many long-distance trains that at present passes through the outskirts of station.

== Recent Developments (2023–2025) ==
Shoranur Junction, a major railway hub in Kerala, has been undergoing significant redevelopment under the Amrit Bharat Station Scheme (ABSS), an initiative launched in 2023 to modernize stations across India. The redevelopment project began in 2023 with a budget of ₹13 crore and is expected to be completed before October 2025.

=== Infrastructure Upgrades ===
The redevelopment includes the construction of a new station building, improved drainage systems, a new retaining wall, and a link road to enhance station access. Passenger amenities have been upgraded with a high-roof concourse, platform resurfacing, improved shelters, and a new waiting hall. Accessibility has also been improved with the installation of lifts attached to foot overbridges.

=== Temporary Measures During Construction ===
During the construction phase, temporary passenger services, such as station buggies, were introduced to help passengers navigate the station campus while foot overbridge access and platform works were underway.

=== Signalling and Safety Enhancements ===
The station is part of broader capacity-upgrade plans on the Ernakulam–Shoranur corridor. A detailed project report for a proposed third line between Ernakulam and Shoranur, including signalling modernization and the planned deployment of automatic block signalling and the Kavach train protection system, has been finalized.

== Trivia ==
- Shoranur was visited by Swami Vivekananda in 1892 during his Kerala tour. It is believed that the Banyan tree which stands between platform numbers two and three was planted by him after addressing a public gathering.
- The "Old Cochin bridge" which connected Shoranur to Cheruthuruthy in Thrissur district was the original railway bridge that connected Malabar to The Princely State Of Cochin . With the construction of the current railway bridge, the bridge started to be used exclusively for road transport.

== See also ==
- Shoranur
- Southern Railway Zone (India)
- Indian Railways
