= Suraksha Clinic =

Hospital group in India

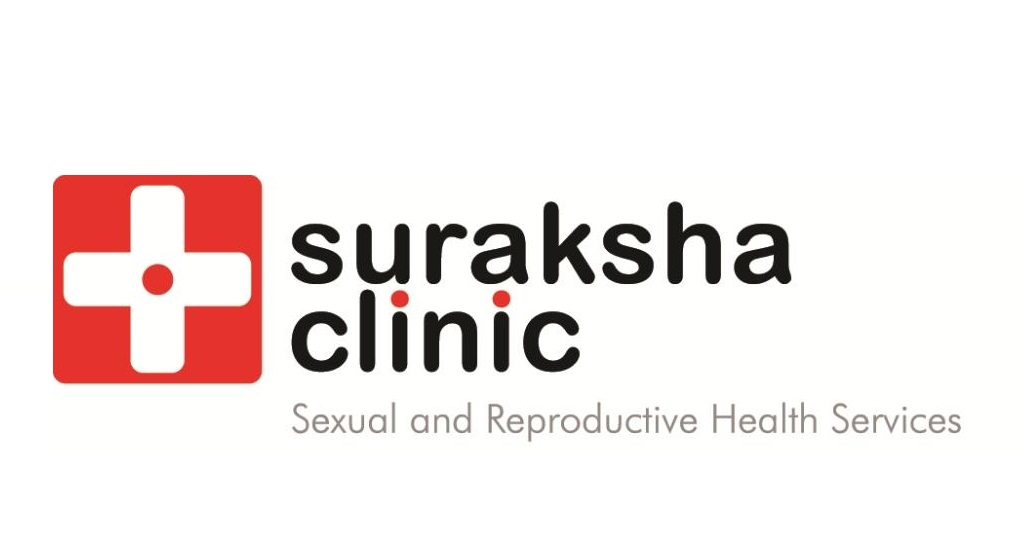
- Formation: 1992
- Purpose: HIV/AIDS control programme in India
- Headquarters: New Delhi
- Parent organization: National AIDS Control Organisation, Ministry of Health and Family Welfare
- Website: [http://www.naco.gov.in]

Suraksha Clinic (formerly Designated STI/RTI Clinics)are a chain of STI/RTI Clinics. These clinics are established by National AIDS Control Organisation for the better health services and for the prevention of HIV/AIDS in India.

== History ==
Suraksha Clinic were established in 71 District Hospitals, 10 Medical Colleges and 5 District Female Hospitals in the state. These clinics are associated with the dermatology department in these Govt. hospitals and Govt. medical colleges so as to cater the need of prevention of sexually transmitted infections and reproductive tract infections.

== Services ==
These clinics serve the purpose of controlling the pandemics such as HIV, herpes, gonorrhea, syphilis, chlamydia, genital warts etc. The Doctor in the clinic refers for the blood test to check the disease. Before the blood samples are taken the candidate/person is given counselling by the counsellers in the clinics where the general details of name, educational qualification, occupation, address, contact no., reason of doubt of infection etc. are noted down which are kept confidential and are used as statics for further research and development purpose. The blood samples are taken empty stomach before half day and then sent for report preparation. After the reports come the candidate is again counselled depending upon his blood status i.e. reactive or non reactive.

== Success ==
As these clinics are associated with dermatology department the patients do not feel hesitated in explaining their troubles.

== Challenges faced ==
Due to the Government of India Supreme Court of India law Section 377 of the Indian Penal Code causes troubles in enforcing the effectiveness of this health concerned program to high risk targeted groups.

== See also ==
- District AIDS Prevention and Control Unit
- HIV/AIDS in India
