= NACP =

The initials NACP can stand for:

- National AIDS Control Programme, a government health organization in Tanzania
- National Agency on Corruption Prevention, a government agency in Ukraine
- Sodium cyclopentadienide (NaCp), a chemical compound

== See also ==
- NAACP, an American human rights group
