= Red ribbon (disambiguation) =

The red ribbon is an awareness ribbon used in support of HIV/AIDS causes.

Red ribbon may also refer to:

- Red Ribbon Army, a fictional army appearing in the Dragon Ball series
- Red Ribbon Bakeshop, a bakery and a subsidiary of Jollibee Foods Corporation based in the Philippines
- Red Ribbon Express, an HIV/AIDS awareness campaign train by the Indian Railways
- Red Ribbon Pairs, a national bridge championship held by the American Contract Bridge League
- Red Ribbon Rebellion, an 1853 gold miners' protest in Bendigo, Victoria, Australia
- Red Ribbon Week, a drug and violence prevention awareness campaign in the United States
- The Red Ribbon, a 1999 Iranian film
- Red ribbons, a species of wildflower
- The ribbon of the Order of the Bath
- One of the Medals of Honor (Japan)
