= Cochin Harbour Terminus =

Railway station in Kochi, Kerala

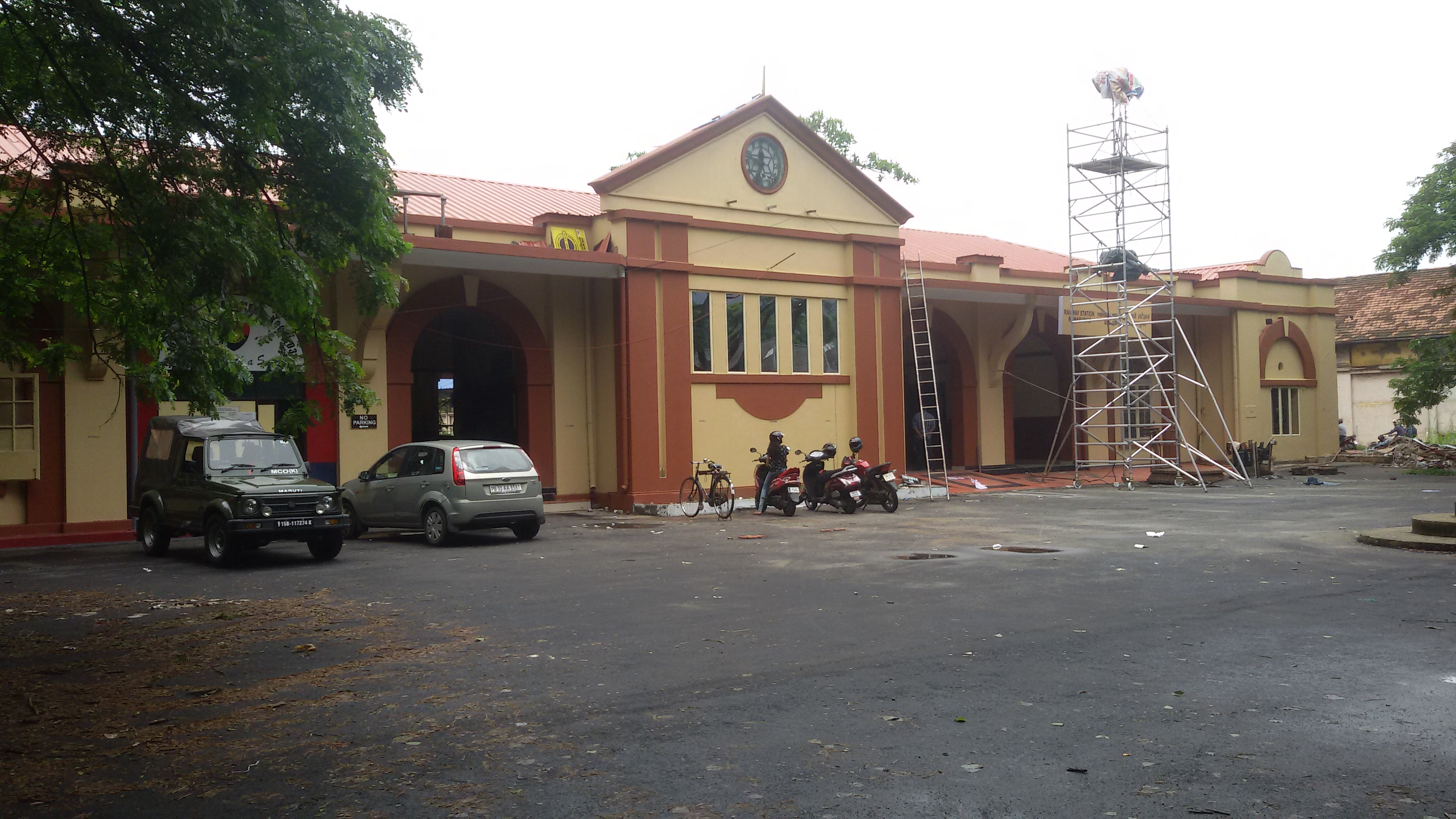
- Cochin Harbour Terminus station.

General information
- Location: Willingdon Island, Kochi, Kerala, India
- Coordinates: 9.955°N 76.269°E
- System: Indian Railways station
- Owner: Indian Railways
- Line: Shoranur–Cochin Harbour section
- Platforms: 2
- Tracks: 5
- Connections: -

Construction
- Structure type: Standard (on-ground station)
- Depth: 450 m (1,480 ft)
- Platform levels: 2
- Parking: Available

Other information
- Station code: CHTS
- Fare zone: Southern Railway

History
- Opened: 1943; 83 years ago
- Closed: 2004
- Rebuilt: 2018

Passengers
- 0: 0 0% (0)
- 0

Services
0
Location
- Location within India Location within Kerala

Cochin Harbour Terminus (station code: CHTS) is an NSG–6 category Indian railway station in Thiruvananthapuram railway division of Southern Railway zone. Located in Willington Island, it is one of the railway stations in the city of Kochi, in the state of Kerala, India. The station has not been in use after the commissioning of International Container Transshipment Terminal, Kochi. Since 2013, only occasional tourist trains carrying passengers arrives at the station – notably the Golden Chariot in 2022. During the peak time of the station, 17 trains operated from here to different parts of the country and served as the principal station providing rail connectivity to the southern segment of the Port of Kochi located on the Willingdon Island.

== Location ==
Cochin harbour terminus is located on the Bristow Road in the Willingdon Island, Kochi. The station used to serve as an easy way to access the Willingdon island which is difficult to reach especially for those outside the city due to limited public road transport system.

== History ==
Cochin Harbour Terminus railway station was built mainly for handling the cargo from Cochin Harbour. Earlier, the trains came only up till the Ernakulam Terminus. The station had a metre-gauge line to Shoranur. This had to be converted to broad gauge to connect it to rest of India. The new broad-gauge line would pass through Ernakulam into Willingdon Island. Many different routes were studied and new stations were planned, and built along the way. These were Ernakulam Town, Ernakulam Junction, Mattancherry Halt and Cochin Harbour Terminus. More than the passenger traffic, freight traffic was anticipated. The Venduruthy Bridge had to be built to connect Willingdon Island with the mainland.

=== Freight traffic ===
Tea, coffee, coir, cotton and other export consignments came here by wagonloads from the harbour, to be loaded to distant destinations across the world. Its strategic location made it a strong revenue-pulling base for freight traffic. A separate coal berth had to be built next to the wharf to cater to the terminus's constant demand for fuel. A station named Cochin Berth was also constructed near Cochin port so that trains from Cochin Harbour Terminus railway station will come there to offload passengers and freight directly to the ships waiting on the side. This station is less than 10 metres from the water. There was a 60-ton railway weighbridge in the railway station which used to weigh tea that arrived from Mettupalayam by Tea Garden Express. The 1980s saw significant growth in passenger and freight traffic from the station. A new container yard was built and storage facilities for ammonia, sulfur and coal were started near the station.

=== Passenger traffic ===
The passenger trains became operational from the station in 1943 with the introduction of Cochin-Shornur Junction passenger. This train had almost the same schedule till it skipped the station, with a service each in the morning and evening. The introduction of the Madras–Cochin Express (now Chennai–Alleppey Express) in 1944 that also had through coaches to Bangalore and Bombay elevated the status of this station. Being the British Raj era, these trains had separate coaches for privileged goods and travellers. Around the same the Ooty–Cochin Tea Garden Express (now Karaikal–Ernakulam Express) set off from this terminus. Later the Island Express (now Kanyakumari–Bangalore Express) named after Willingdon Island also started in the 1960s. A train to Chennai leaving Kochi in the afternoon was introduced later. An important landmark in the history of the Cochin harbour terminus was when the first diesel train was flagged of by the then railway minister in 1961, when many other parts of India still ran on steam. By this time this railway station had become a major focal point for passenger and cargo movement. The next two decades witnessed more trains chugging off from this terminus. A second train to Madras (now the Chennai–Trivandrum Mail) was also started. With the opening of Cochin harbour station many other trains like the Jayanthi Janatha, Netravathi, Dadar, Rajkot, Patna, Bilaspur Expresses commenced operations. It was directly linked to several important and remote destinations of India. Around 17 trains started its service from the Cochin harbour terminus station during its peak time of operation. The station stopped its passenger train service in 2004. Since then, few tourist trains carrying passengers have come to the station, the recent being the luxury train, Golden Chariot, carrying 25 tourists reaching it in November 2022.

=== Downfall ===
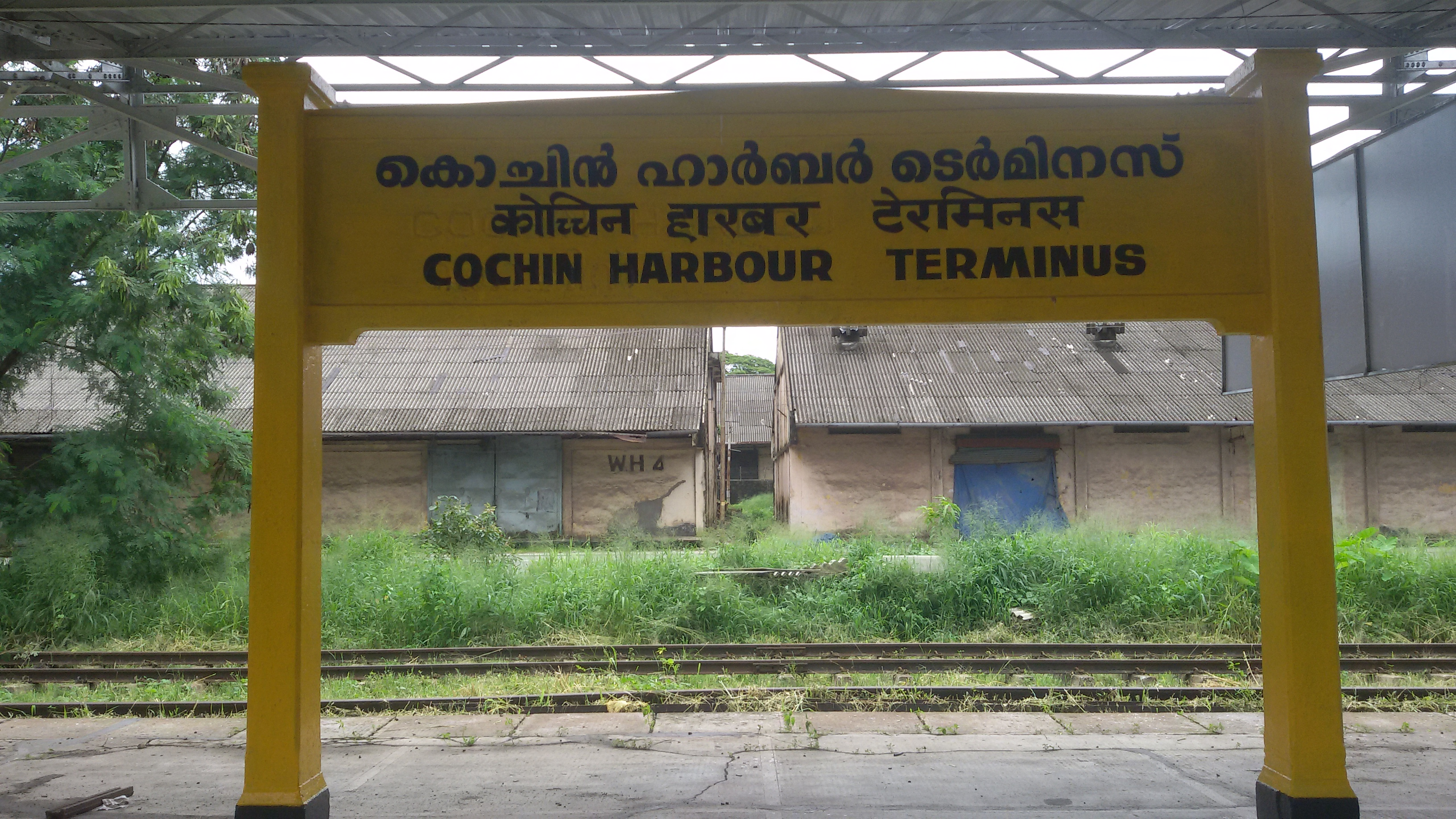
The three-language sign board

==== Shifting of Base station ====
Cochin Harbour Terminus railway station suffered a major setback in 1978, when Thiruvananthapuram was selected over Kochi as the base station of Southern India Railways, in spite of protests and uproar in the Parliament.

==== Opening of new stations Ernakulam Junction and Ernakulam Town ====
As the new stations Ernakulam Junction and Ernakulam Town were inaugurated most of the passenger trains were diverted to these stations and there by passenger patronage decreased.

==== Rail link extensions to Trivandrum and Alappuzha ====
As the rail link connecting to Thiruvananthapuram Central via Kottayam and Ernakulam–Kayamkulam coastal railway line via Alappuzha was completed, many trains were diverted from Cochin Harbour Terminus to Thiruvananthapuram Central. Remaining trains were diverted to Ernakulam Junction also. The shifting of train routes started in 1991, when the Cochin–Madras Express, was extended to Alappuzha.

==== Objection of Navy in electrification of line ====
In 1996 the Railways charted out the electrification route and decided to make Cochin harbour terminus the focal point. But the Navy and the Civil Aviation Department objected due to the risks involved for the incoming and ongoing flights at the Cochin Airport. The electrification was thus done only till the Ernakulam Junction. The six-kilometre route from Ernakulam to Willingdon Island was thereby left out and remained unelectrified. Also there has been no passenger services through the Harbour Terminus for over a decade after a dredger hit the Venduruthy Bridge in 2004.

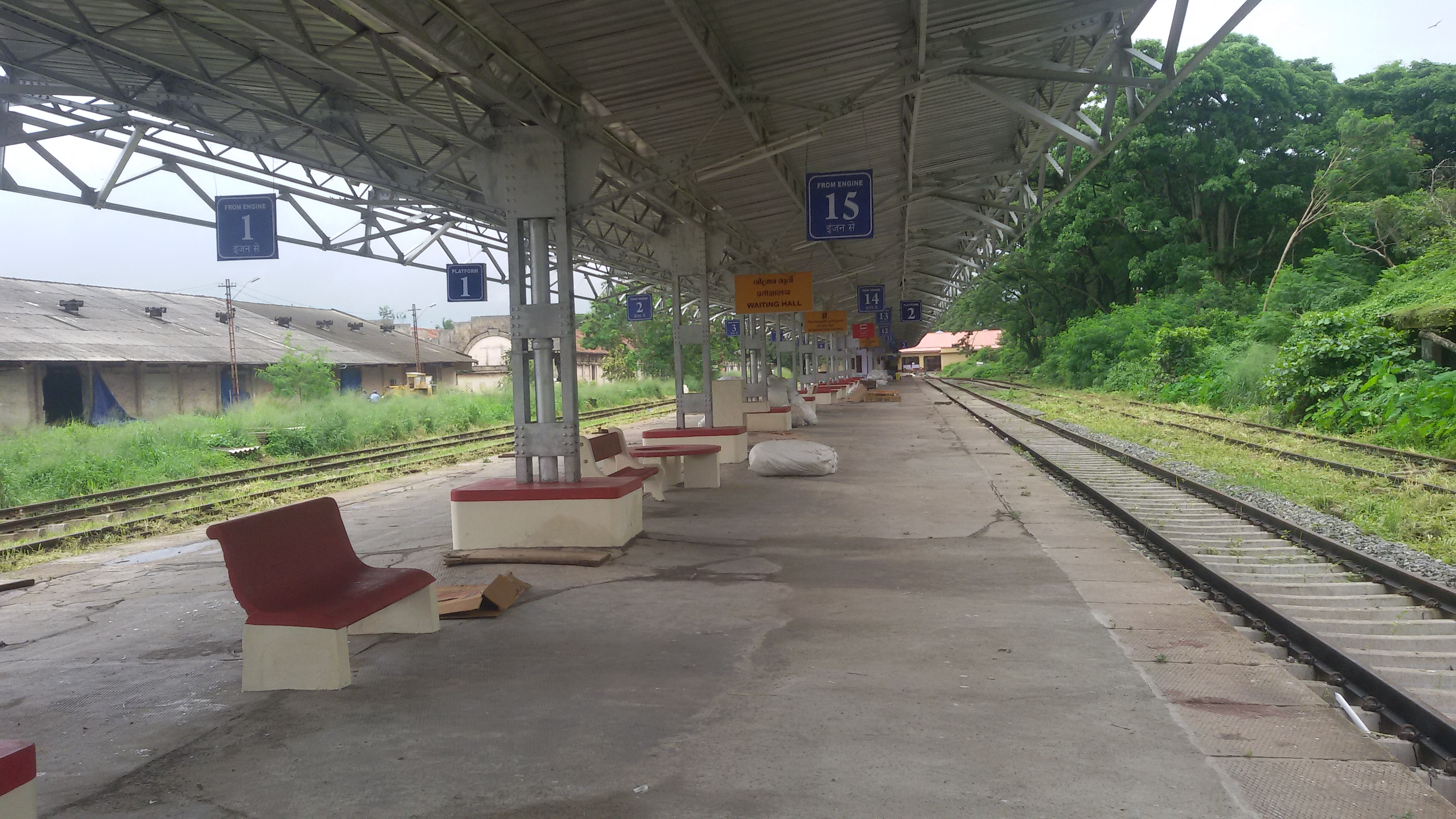
Platforms 1 & 2

=== Recent history ===
==== Ernakulam Junction - Cochin Harbour Terminus DEMU ====
In 2018, a DEMU service to Ernakulam Junction (ERS) was announced to start from 26 September 2018 for one month on experimental basis. It was scheduled to have a morning and evening service. The only halt en-route was at Mattancheri Halt (MTNC) on both direction. Running time was reduced by 5 minutes from October 1, 2018. The service is now discontinued after running only 8 days due to objections from some local residents about the Vathuruthy Railway level crossing.

==== Event Hosting ====
In October 2019, Cochin Harbour Terminus was leased out to host a private event.

==== Film Shooting ====
Due to lack of regular traffic and availability of open space, Cochin Harbour Terminus is a popular movie shooting location for Malayalam movies. Mikhael, Irupathiyonnam Nootandu, and Brother's day are a few examples of movies shot at Cochin Harbour Terminus.

==== Arrival of tourist trains ====
In December 2019, the ultra luxury train Deccan Odyssey arrived at Cochin Harbour Terminus during its Kerala Itinerary. In November 2022, another luxury train The Golden Chariot carrying 25 tourists reaches the station.

== Future proposals ==
=== Kochi Suburban Railway ===
The workforce in Kochi consists of thousands of people who travel daily from the neighboring suburbs and even nearby districts of Thrissur, Kottayam and Alappuzha. Due to the lack of a dedicated suburban railway system, these people are forced to depend mostly on Express trains (for which fares are comparatively high) or slow passenger trains (which very rarely reach Ernakulam on time) to travel to their workplace.

Once the Harbour Terminus is revived, the suburban railway system could be started for Kochi. The vast space owned by the Railways available at this station could be used to construct additional platforms, pit-lanes and a maintenance shed. The existing railway infrastructure in Kochi and outlying suburbs requires only a small upgrade to accommodate suburban services. These include streamlining the ticketing process (like smart cards for daily commuters) for smoother flow of passengers, upgrading passenger facilities at stations (constructing foot overbridges and waiting halls) and installing automatic signalling systems for better management of train traffic. Dedicated suburban rakes (like the ones used in Mumbai Suburban Railway) can operate within Ernakulam district limits (northwards till Angamaly and southwards till Piravom/Kumbalam). The Sabari railway line, once completed, could also be used for connecting services from Angamaly to Muvattupuzha, Kothamangalam and up towards Pala. MEMU rakes can be used for long-haul local services to neighbouring districts of Thrissur, Alappuzha and Kottayam.

=== Third railway station in Kochi ===
Once the passenger services from Cochin Harbour Terminus is revived after the completion of the new Venduruthy bridge, it would serve as the third railway station in Kochi city. The already existing railway stations, Ernakulam Junction (ERS) (at Ernakulam South) and Ernakulam Town (ERN) (at Ernakulam North), face a severe lack of space and facilities. Two pairs of new Mainline Electric Multiple Unit (MEMU) services from Kochi were announced in Railway budget 2009-'10 and 2010-'11. Currently about 12 pairs of local passenger trains operate in and out of Kochi. The Indian Railways plan to replace them with Mainline Electric Multiple Unit (MEMU) services in future. But due to lack of a MEMU maintenance shed at CHTS and lack of electrification from Ernakulam South to CHTS, these MEMU trains operate now from Ernakulam South (ERS). Ample space available at Cochin Harbour Terminus could be made use to build the MEMU Car Shed at Cochin Harbour Terminus. The station could be upgraded to provide facilities to start long haul Express trains from Kochi, beginning with diesel-traction trains operated through Konkan Railway. The station building is a rare masterpiece of architecture and it really adds to the antique features of the city of Cochin. There have been several demands to revive this station to full operational capacity by Ernakulam Powra Samithy, Ernakulam Old railway station Vikasana Samithy, Western India Passengers' Association etc.

=== Handling bulk cargo at Cochin Port ===
The bulk cargo handling facilities at Cochin port remain inadequate. Cochin port has port side rail sidings that is suitable to handle bulk cargo. But due to inadequate facilities there has been a decrease in the bulk cargo, especially coal, handled at the port. The main reason is the lack of electrification in the Ernakulam Junction-Cochin Harbour Terminus section due to height restrictions imposed by the navy. The line pass very near to the naval airport at Kochi. The navy has permitted a height of only 3.6m while at least 6.4m is needed for the structures related to electrification. Once the rail sidings are revived and the lines are electrified, then there would be considerable increase in the revenue from Cochin port.

=== Closeness to Mattancherry Wharf ===
Cochin Harbour Terminus is very closely located to Mattancherry Wharf (Q1- Q4) of the Cochin Port. Passenger and tourist ships moor at Mattancherry Wharf. It is due to this fact that Mangala Lakshadweep Express (12618/12617) used to start from Cochin Harbour Terminus to provide connection to passenger ships from Cochin port to Lakshadweep. Now with tourist ships frequently berthing at Cochin port, Cochin Harbour Terminus could be developed as a boarding point for tourist trains like Bharath Third. The numerous 5-star hotels near the station add to the advantages.

=== Rail Side Container Terminal Cochin Harbour Terminus (CHTS) ===
Rail Side Container Terminal, Cochin Harbour Terminus, of the Container Corporation of India was commissioned in December, 1990. Spread over a total area of 4.20 acres, the terminal has modern facilities to offer a wide range of logistics service to the customers. The terminal is open for both EXIM and Domestic traffic, dealt through Rail and Road. The total paved area is 10,854 Sq. Mt. It has a rail siding that can handle up to 40 wagons. Modern equipment like reach stacker (70 tons) and sling crane are available here.

Container Rail Services from Rail Side Container Terminal Cochin Harbour Terminus (CHTS)
Source	Destination	Frequency
Cochin Harbour Terminus (CHTS)	ICD Whitefield, Bangalore (WFD)	Weekly
Cochin Harbour Terminus (CHTS)	Milavittan, Tuticurin (MVN)	Daily
Cochin Harbour Terminus (CHTS)	ICD Irugur, Coimbatore (IGU)	On Demand

- Modifying the railway line so as give direct access to the station from Alappuzha side bypassing Ernakulam Junction station. This would facilitate the commencement of passenger trains towards Alappuzha, without having the trains to change direction at Ernakulam Junction. Thus a considerable ease could be brought at Ernakulam Junction by diverting a section of the passenger traffic to Cochin Harbour terminus.
- Construct two additional platforms
- Extend existing platforms
- Reinstate the public announcement system.
- Electrification and doubling of Ernakulam South–Cochin Harbour section
- Extending trains currently terminating at Ernakulam Junction
- The budget gave green signal for the Ernakulam–Kollam MEMU services. The vast space and infrastructure at the station could be utilized to set up the MEMU shed in Kochi.
- The station has now two platforms. 270 m of the total length of more than 300 m has roofing. This would be sufficient to hold at least 12 coaches. Thus there is not much investment involved in renovating the station building.
- The station could be made the base for MEMU services in Kerala.
- The suburban railway system could be experimented in Kochi.
- It could be a halt for the exhibition trains like Azadi express, Red Ribbon Express, Science express etc.
- The Southern railway can experiment the Ro-Ro model of transport as in Konkan railway from Cochin Harbour Terminus
