= Tatanagar–Alappuzha Express =

Train in India

Tatanagar-Ernakulam Express
Overview
- Service type: Express
- First service: 1 October 1970; 55 years ago
- Current operator: South Eastern Railway

Route
- Termini: Tatanagar (TATA); Ernakulam (ERS)
- Stops: 50
- Distance travelled: 2,297 km (1,427 mi)
- Average journey time: 44 hrs 55 mins
- Service frequency: Daily (Note: Runs seven days in a week for every direction.)
- Train number: 18189 / 18190

On-board services
- Classes: AC 2 Tier, AC 3 Tier, AC 3 Tier Economy, Sleeper Class, General Unreserved
- Seating arrangements: No
- Sleeping arrangements: Yes
- Catering facilities: On-board catering, E-catering
- Observation facilities: Large windows
- Baggage facilities: No
- Other facilities: Below the seats

Technical
- Rolling stock: LHB coach
- Track gauge: 1,676 mm (5 ft 6 in)
- Operating speed: 51 km/h (32 mph) average including halts.

The 18189 / 18190 Tatanagar–Ernakulam Express was an express train belonging to South Eastern Railway zone that ran between Tatanagar Junction and Ernakulam Junction in India. It was operated with 18189/18190 train numbers on daily basis. Till 2020, it ran as a link train between Tata Nagar to Alappuzha by attaching and detaching with Dhanbad - Alappuzha Express at Rourkela. Since, link train services in India was discontinued, this link train service was stopped for many months. After 2021, it was started as a independed train on a weekly basis with the same train number 18189/18190 between Tata Nagar and Ernakulam Junction.

The train service was stopped till Ernakulam instead of Alappuzha. It runs with different timings and route had also been changed. It runs via Gudivada, instead of Eluru route and bypasses Chennai Central by having additional stoppage at Perambur and again bypasses Coimbatore junction with additional stoppage at Podanur Junction. In 2023 it was changed into Tri-Weekly service and after May 2024 it started to run as a daily train service, connecting Jharkhand with Andhra Pradesh, Tamilnadu and Kerala. At present, it runs as 18189/18190 Tatanagar - Ernakulam - Tatanagar Express.

== History ==
It ran as a link train which used to get attached to Dhanbad Alappuzha Express at Rourkela Junction railway station. Indian Railways is currently discontinuing the link services and this train also was discontinued as a link train. In place of this, a new independent train Tatanagar - Ernakulam Express was introduced for the benefit of passengers with the same train number with different timings and routes.

== See also ==
- Alappuzha railway station
- Dhanbad Junction railway station
- Dhanbad–Alappuzha Express
- Tatanagar - Ernakulam Express
- Ernakulam–Patna Express (via Chennai)
- Ernakulam–Patna Express (via Tirupati)
