= District AIDS Prevention and Control Unit =

District unit to control HIV in India

District AIDS Prevention and Control Unit (DAPCU) is a district level decentralized monitoring unit of National AIDS Control Organisation in India. They have been established in 189 high priority districts across the country as a step toward decentralization of the coordination and management of Government of India's National AIDS Control Programme, by working in close coordination with the district administration to take up district specific initiatives by leveraging local resources. DAPCUs have been trained and mentored to perform the challenging task of coordinating and monitoring of NACP activities.
