= Tatanagar–Ernakulam Express =

Train in India

- Train board of Tatanagar-Ernakulam Express

Overview
- Service type: Express
- Locale: Jharkhand, Odisha, Andhra Pradesh, Tamil Nadu & Kerala
- First service: 28 January 2021; 5 years ago
- Current operator: South Eastern Railway

Route
- Termini: Tatanagar (TATA); Ernakulam (ERS)
- Stops: 52
- Distance travelled: 2,297 km (1,427 mi)
- Average journey time: 44 hours 55 minutes
- Service frequency: Daily
- Train number: 18189 / 18190

On-board services
- Classes: AC 2 Tier, AC 3 Tier, AC 3 Tier Economy, Sleeper Class, General Unreserved
- Seating arrangements: Yes
- Sleeping arrangements: Yes
- Catering facilities: Available
- Observation facilities: Large windows
- Baggage facilities: Available
- Other facilities: Below the seats

Technical
- Rolling stock: LHB coach
- Track gauge: 1,676 mm (5 ft 6 in)
- Operating speed: 51 km/h (32 mph) average including halts.

The 18189 / 18190 Tatanagar–Ernakulam Express is an express class train operated by the South Eastern Railway of India connecting Ernakulam (Kochi) with the steel-producing city Jamshedpur in Jharkhand state. The Tatanagar- Ernakulam Express is the replacement train of Tatanagar - Alappuzha Express. It covers 2,297 kilometres (1,427 mi) at an average speed of 51 kilometres per hour (32 mph).

== Traction ==
Earlier was WDM-3A or WDP-4B. It is hauled by a Tatanagar Loco Shed based WAP-7 electric locomotive from end to end.

== Coach composition ==
Earlier the train had ICF coaches. Now this train gets standard LHB coaches.

Loco	1	2	3	4	5	6	7	8	9	10	11	12	13	14	15	16	17	18	19	20	21	22
	SLRD	GEN	GEN	S1	S2	S3	S4	S5	S6	PC	M1	M2	B1	B2	B3	B4	B5	A1	A2	GEN	GEN	EOG

== Train schedule ==
From Tatanagar Jn to Ernakulam Jn - 18189. The train starts from Tatanagar Jn everyday.

Station code	Station name	Arrival	Departure
TATA	Tatanagar Junction	---	05:00
SINI	Sini	05:23	05:25
RKSN	Rajakharsawan Junction	05:38	05:40
CKP	Chakradharpur	06:03	06:05
GOL	Goilkera	06:31	06:32
JRA	Jaraikela	07:25	07:26
ROU	Rourkela Junction	07:50	07:55
GP	Rajgangpur	08:18	08:20
JSG	Jharsuguda Junction	09:40	09:45
SBP	Sambalpur Jn	10:45	10:55
BRGA	Bargarh Road	11:35	11:40
BLGR	Balangir Jn	12:43	12:48
TIG	Titlagarh Junction	13:50	14:00
KSNG	Kesinga	14:20	14:22
MNGD	Muniguda	15:28	15:30
AMB	Ambodala	15:28	15:30
RGDA	Rayagada	17:00	17:05
PVP	Parvatipuram	17:53	17:55
VBL	Bobbili Junction	18:18	18:20
VZM	Vizianagaram Junction	19:15	19:20
DVD	Duvvada	20:43	20:45
AKP	Anakapalle	20:58	21:00
TUNI	Tuni	21:38	21:40
SLO	Samalkot Junction	22:28	22:30
RJY	Rajahmundry	23:13	23:15
NDD	Nidadavolu	23:49	23:50
TNKU	Tanuku	00:03	00:05
BVRT	Bhimavaram Town	00:38	00:40
KKLR	Kaikaluru	01:18	01:20
GDV	Gudivada Junction	02:08	02:10
BZA	Vijayawada Junction	03:50	04:00
TEL	Tenali Junction	04:23	04:25
BPP	Bapatla	04:58	05:00
CLX	Chirala	05:13	05:15
OGL	Ongole	06:33	06:35
KVZ	Kavali	07:24	07:25
NLR	Nellore	08:13	08:15
GDR	Gudur Junction	09:48	09:50
PER	Perambur	12:20	12:25
AJJ	Arakkonam Junction	13:35	13:40
KPD	Katpadi Junction	14:45	15:00
JTJ	Jolarpettai Junction	16:48	16:50
SA	Salem Junction	18:17	18:20
ED	Erode Junction	19:20	19:30
TUP	Tiruppur	20:13	20:15
PTJ	Podanur Junction	21:29	21:30
PGT	Palakkad Junction	22:35	22:40
TCR	Thrissur	23:50	23:53
AWY	Aluva	00:55	00:57
ERS	Ernakulam Junction	01:55	---

From Ernakulam Jn to Tatanagar Jn - 18190. The train starts from Tatanagar Jn everyday.

Station code	Station name	Arrival	Departure
ERS	Ernakulam Junction	---	07:15
AWY	Aluva	07:38	07:40
TCR	Thrissur	08:37	08:40
PGT	Palakkad Junction	10:05	10:10
PTJ	Podanur Junction	11:28	11:30
TUP	Tiruppur	12:10	12:15
ED	Erode Junction	13:05	13:15
SA	Salem Junction	14:10	14:15
JTJ	Jolarpettai Junction	16:53	16:55
KPD	Katpadi Junction	18:10	18:15
AJJ	Arakkonam Junction	18:55	18:57
PER	Perambur	19:45	19:50
GDR	Gudur Junction	22:28	22:30
NLR	Nellore	23:03	23:05
KVZ	Kavali	00:03	00:05
OGL	Ongole	00:53	00:55
CLX	Chirala	01:38	01:40
BPP	Bapatla	01:58	02:00
TEL	Tenali Junction	02:33	02:35
BZA	Vijayawada Junction	03:25	03:35
GDV	Gudivada Junction	04:18	04:20
KKLR	Kaikaluru	04:53	04:55
BVRT	Bhimavaram Town	05:28	05:30
TNKU	Tanuku	06:08	06:10
NDD	Nidadavolu	06:58	07:00
RJY	Rajahmundry	07:48	07:50
SLO	Samalkot Junction	08:38	08:40
TUNI	Tuni	09:38	09:40
AKP	Anakapalle	11:03	11:05
DVD	Duvvada	11:53	11:55
VZM	Vizianagaram Junction	13:10	13:20
VBL	Bobbili Junction	14:03	14:05
PVP	Parvatipuram	14:28	14:30
RGDA	Rayagada	15:25	15:30
MNGD	Muniguda	16:40	16:42
KSNG	Kesinga	17:42	17:44
TIG	Titlagarh Junction	18:05	18:15
BLGR	Balangir Jn	19:06	19:11
BRGA	Bargarh Road	20:03	20:08
SBP	Sambalpur Jn	21:30	21:40
JSG	Jharsuguda Junction	23:30	23:35
GP	Rajgangpur	00:33	00:35
ROU	Rourkela Junction	01:07	01:15
JRA	Jaraikela	01:43	01:45
GOL	Goilkera	02:28	02:30
CKP	Chakradharpur	03:00	03:05
SINI	Sini Junction	03:40	03:42
TATA	Tatanagar Junction	05:00	---

== Accidents and Incidents ==
A passenger died in a fire that engulfed two AC coaches of Train no. 18189 Tatanagar–Ernakulam Express at Yelamanchili railway station, under the Vijayawada division of South Central Railway, in the early hours of Monday. The other passengers had a miraculous escape. The cause of the fire is yet to be determined.
