= Ashraya =

Organization

- Formation: 1982
- Type: Charitable organisation (Registered Society)
- Legal status: Tax exempted
- Location: Bengaluru
- Coordinates: 12.9699°N 77.6499°E
- Region served: Karnataka, India
- Services: welfare of children and women
- Founder: Rama Ananth
- President: Shanthi Chacko
- Secretary: Nomita Chandy
- Board of directors: 5 member board of directors
- Subsidiaries: Ashraya Neelbagh Residential School
- Website: www.ashraya.net

Ashraya is an Indian non governmental organisation headquartered at Indiranagar, Bengaluru, Karnataka, India, working for the welfare of destitute children and empowerment of women.

== Objectives ==
Ashraya was founded in 1982 by a group of young women, under the leadership of its founder, Rama Ananth, for the welfare of destitute children and to provide them with residential care. The organisation was designed to provide temporary place of rest for the children before safe homes are found for them through legal adoption. Ashraya has a mandated mission to provide non-institutional care to destitute children and to empower women.

== History and programs ==
At the time of its foundation in 1982, the organisation was focused on the welfare of the children of migrant construction workers in Bengaluru. By selling greeting cards as a means of fund-raising and operating out of a small rented place in the city, the organisation initially set up on-site creches for the children of women workers. From the modest beginning, Ashraya has now widened their spectrum of activities to cover the welfare of the entire family.

The programs of Ashraya fall under two main themes, welfare of children and empowerment of women. Towards the first of these two themes, the organisation runs seven mobile creches, mostly on-site creches, at various places in the city such as Indiranagar, Yelahanka, Siddapura, Avalahalli, Banaswadi and Shivaji Nagar and one permanent crèche associated with its Child Care Centre.

Neelbagh Residential school was started by Ashraya in 1996 near Madanapally, around 100 km from Bengaluru and is open to the children of migrant workers. The curriculum is based on Kannada medium with English as a second language and has classes from Lower kindergarten till 10th standard. It also runs vocational training programs for the students in carpentry, electrical wiring, plumbing, pottery, tailoring and bee-keeping. The school claims 100 per cent pass in the state level examinations since 2009.

Children's Observation Home is another one of Ashraya's ventures. It is aimed at juvenile delinquents and was started 1997 as an informal school for the children. The centre aims to rehabilitate young criminals and provide them with counselling, vocational training and education. It has earned the organisation a membership in the Home Management Committee of the Government of Karnataka. It has also earned certification from the Government of India under the Integrated Child Protection Scheme (ICPS).

Tara is Ashraya's residential centre for destitute women. The centre is a 23-unit residential facility with associated health care and day care centres, and is managed by professionally-trained people. The place provides shelter to unwed mothers and their children, with the maximum period of stay limited to two years. The centre proposes to arm the mothers with earning means within this period through counselling and vocational training.

Ashraya is reported to have rehabilitated 3000 children through legal adoption, 2000 within the country and 1000 outside. It has also faced difficulties due to stringent laws pertaining to adoption of children and has fought with the Central Adoption Resource Authority (CARA) in court against the unfriendly practices and inordinate delay in the completion of formalities.

The Government of India recognised the services of Ashraya by honoring its secretary, Nomita Chandy, with the fourth highest Indian civilian award of Padma Shri, in 2011.

== Resources ==
The main source of income is donations in cash or kind. The organisation also sells merchandise to raise funds. Ashraya also relies on funds from external agencies. Paul Hamlyn Foundation, a UK organisation, assisted Ashraya in the setting up of Tara, the women's residential centre. Sudha, a convention centre owned and run by Ashraya also contributes to the income by way of rental returns.

== See also ==
- Nomita Chandy
- Non-governmental organisations in India
