= Ernakulam–Bilaspur Superfast Express =

Train in India

Overview
- Service type: Superfast
- First service: 14 November 2011; 14 years ago
- Current operator: South East Central Railway

Route
- Termini: Ernakulam (ERS); Bilaspur (BSP)
- Stops: 21
- Distance travelled: 2,143 km (1,332 mi)
- Average journey time: 37 hrs 05 mins
- Service frequency: Weekly
- Train number: 22816 / 22815

On-board services
- Classes: AC 2 tier, AC 3 tier, Sleeper class, General Unreserved
- Seating arrangements: Yes
- Sleeping arrangements: Yes
- Catering facilities: On-board catering, E-catering
- Observation facilities: Large windows
- Baggage facilities: No
- Other facilities: Below the seats

Technical
- Rolling stock: LHB coach
- Track gauge: 1,676 mm (5 ft 6 in)
- Operating speed: 58 km/h (36 mph) average including halts.
Route map
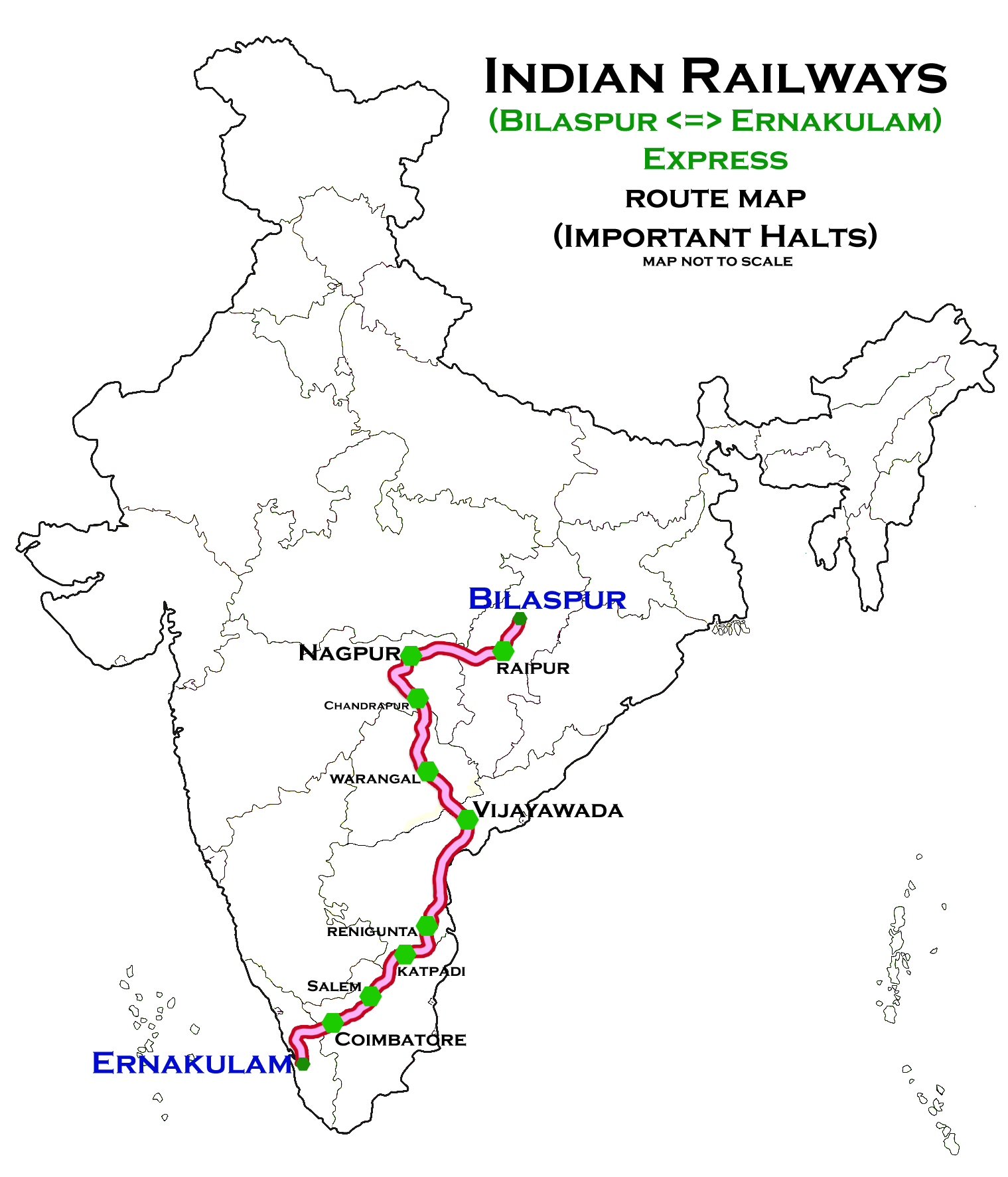

The 22816 / 22815 Ernakulam–Bilaspur Superfast Express is a Superfast Express train that runs between Ernakulam Junction and Bilaspur Junction. The train belongs to the South East Central Railway zone of Indian Railways.

It operates as train number 22816 from Ernakulam Junction to Bilaspur Junction and as train number 22815 in the reverse direction, serving the states of Kerala, Tamil Nadu, Andhra Pradesh, Telangana, Maharashtra & Chhattisgarh.
