= Ernakulam Terminus railway station =

Abandoned railway station in Kochi

Ernakulam Terminus
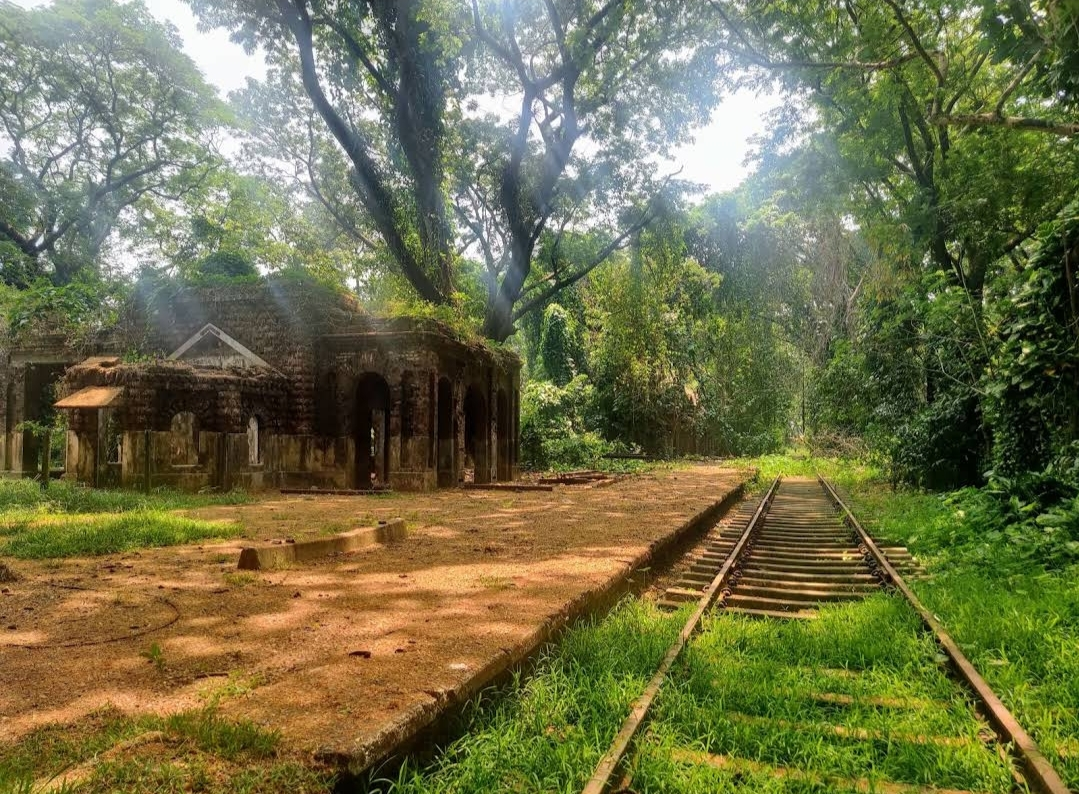
- Ernakulam Terminus Railway Station as of 2020

General information
- Location: Ernakulam, Kochi, Kerala, India
- Coordinates: 9.987°N 76.275°E
- System: Indian Railway Station
- Owner: Indian Railways

Other information
- Station code: ^ERG
- Fare zone: Southern Railway

History
- Opened: 1902; 124 years ago
- Closed: 1990; 36 years ago
Location
- Location within India Location within Kerala

Ernakulam Terminus (Station Code:ERG), also called as Ernakulam Goods Station or Ernakulam Old Station, is an abandoned railway station in the Indian city of Kochi, Kerala. It is one of the first railway stations in Kochi, built by the Maharaja Rama Varma XV of Kochi. The first passenger trains started service from the station on 16 July 1902. The station lost its prominence with the commissioning of Ernakulam Junction railway station in 1932 and Cochin Harbour Terminus in 1943. Though a few passenger-trains used to halt at the old station till the 1960s, it was ignored with the passage of time and was abandoned in 1990. Many historical figures like Mahatma Gandhi, Swami Vivekananda and Rabindranath Tagore have visited Kochi through this station.

== History ==
When the British rejected the demand of Maharaja Rama Varma of Kochi Kingdom for a railway line to Kochi, he took up the construction cost himself. The state of Kochi, which had only 2 lakh rupees at that time set aside in its annual budget, undertook this project at a cost of 44 lakh rupees. It is said that the King raised the money for the project by selling the gold foreheads of the Thripunithura Sreepurnathrayisa temple. The King and his wife became the first passengers on the first train service. Mahatma Gandhi, who came to participate in the Vaikom Satyagraha first got off the train here. In 1920, the renowned engineer Robert Bristow, who is known for developing Kochi into a modern port city landed in Kerala for the first time at this station.

Despite losing its prominence in the 1930s due to the arrival of Ernakulam Junction railway station, passenger train services used to halt at the station till 1960. But the renovation of Ernakulam Town and Ernakulam Junction railway stations along with the construction of Cochin Harbour Terminus in 1943 gradually led to its complete closure in 1990. Many projects, such as a suburban hub, railway medical college, and Southern Railway maintenance hub, were mooted on the terminal premises but no constructive work was achieved. In 2001, the government converted the station into a goods shed, but that too was gradually abandoned.

== Renovation plans ==
In 2016, the Indian Railways proposed a ₹ 505 crore development project to preserve the station and its heritage. In the first phase, one and a half crores were sanctioned. Tracks over 100 years old were upgraded with this fund. But after three months, the works were stopped. The Ernakulam old railway station preservation committee had alleged that someone who want to acquire the 42-acre land where the railway station locates are behind the blocking of the project.

== See also ==
- Cochin Harbour Terminus
- Ernakulam Junction
- Ernakulam Town
- Transport in Kochi
- Indian Railways
