= Nomita Chandy =

Indian social worker from Bangalore

- Born: 21 August 1946; Bangalore, Karnataka, India
- Died: 24 May 2015; Bangalore, Karnataka, India
- Occupation: Social worker
- Spouse: Mohan Chandy
- Children: 2
- Awards: Padma Shri
- Website: Official web site

Nomita Chandy was an Indian social worker from Bangalore, known for her services towards the rehabilitation of destitute children.

She attended Lawrence School, Lovedale. Chandy

She was the founder and secretary of Ashraya, a non-governmental organization, working mainly towards the rehabilitation to destitute children. Under the aegis of the organization, Chandy and her colleagues were successful in arranging for the legal adoption of 2000 children within the country and 1000 outside. The organization also runs a school, Neelbagh, and a safe crèche for the children of migrant workers and takes care of eight visually impaired children at the child care centre.

In 2014, she was honoured by the Government of India with Padma Shri, the fourth highest Indian civilian award.

== Death ==
Chandy died in May 2015 at Bengaluru.
