= Sunil Solomon =

Indian academic

Sunil Suhas Solomon is an Indian academic and associate professor of Medicine, in the Division of Infectious Diseases, at the Johns Hopkins University School of Medicine. Dr Sunil is also the chairman of YRGCARE. His work revolves around epidemiology, clinical management and access to HIV and HCV services for at risk populations.

== Early life and education ==
He obtained the medical training at Sri Ramachandra Medical University in Chennai and eventually did a Masters in Public Health and a doctorate in Epidemiology (PhD) from the Johns Hopkins University, USA.

== Publications ==
- Integrated HIV Testing, Prevention, and Treatment Intervention for Key Populations in India: A Cluster-Randomised Trial The Lancet HIV, Vol. 6, No. 5, e283–e296
- The holy grail of HIV programme effectiveness The Lancet HIV, Vol. 4, No. 3, e96–e98
- Community viral load, antiretroviral therapy coverage, and HIV incidence in India: a cross-sectional, comparative study The Lancet HIV, Vol. 3, No. 4, e183–e190
- High HIV prevalence and incidence among MSM across 12 cities in India AIDS. 29(6):723–731, MARCH 27TH, 2015

== Awards and recognition ==
- Avenir award, a Director's award from the National Institutes of Health
