= Ernakulam–H.Nizamuddin Duronto Express =

Train service in India

Ernakulam Jn – Hazrat Nizamuddin Duronto Express
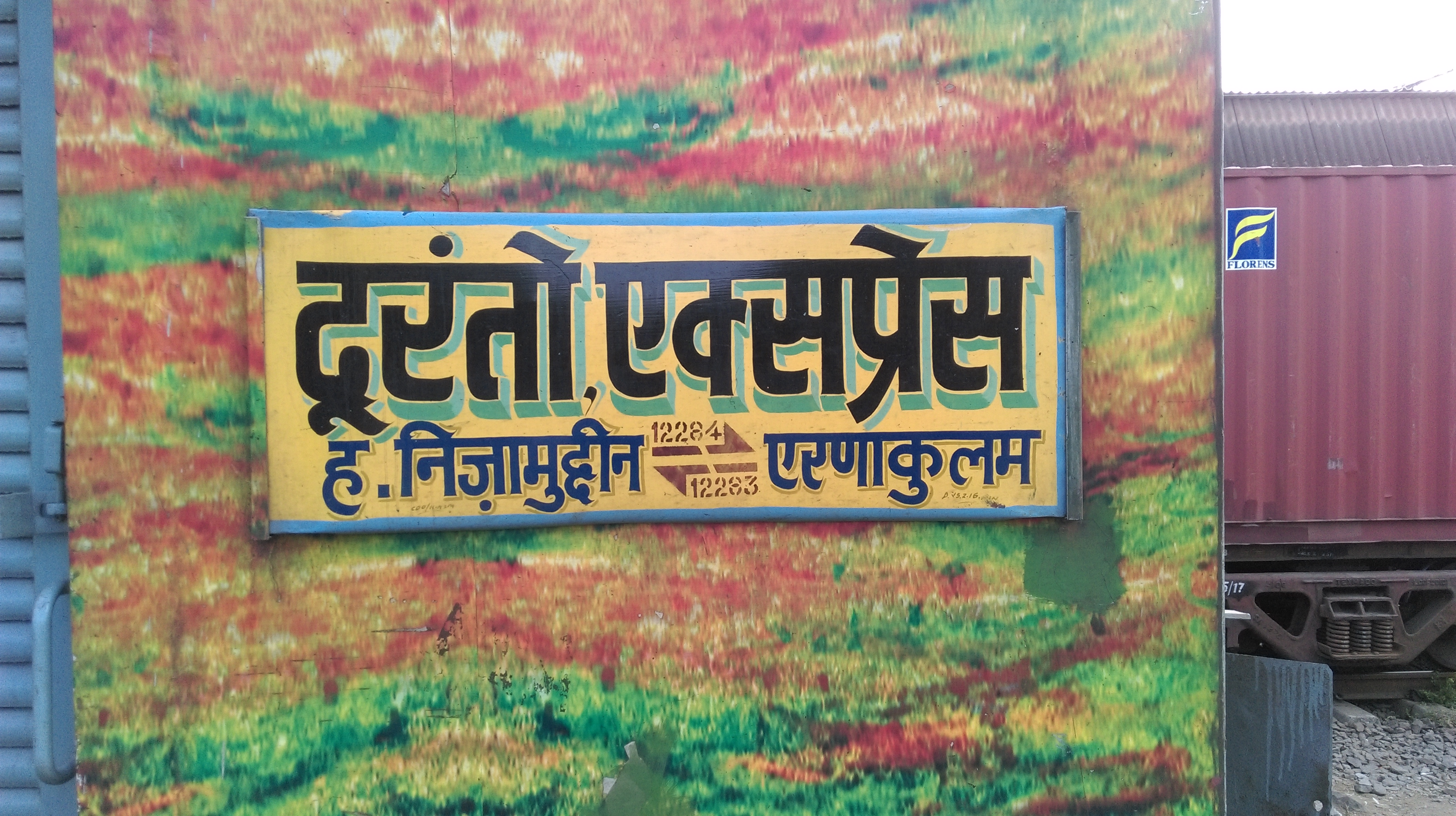

Overview
- Service type: Duronto Express
- First service: 7 March 2010
- Current operator: Indian Railways

Route
- Termini: Ernakulam Junction; Hazrat Nizamuddin
- Stops: 11
- Distance travelled: 2,943 km (1,829 mi)
- Average journey time: 44h 25m
- Service frequency: Weekly
- Train number: 12283/12284

On-board services
- Classes: First AC, Second AC, Third AC, Sleeper
- Seating arrangements: Yes
- Sleeping arrangements: Yes
- Catering facilities: Yes
- Observation facilities: Large windows
- Baggage facilities: Under the seats
- Other facilities: Pantry Car, Catering

Technical
- Rolling stock: LHB coach
- Track gauge: Broad - 1,676 mm (5 ft 6 in)
- Operating speed: 63 km/h

The 12283 / 12284 Ernakulam Junction - Hazrat Nizamuddin Duronto Superfast Express is a weekly Duronto Express category train that runs between Ernakulam in Kerala, and the national capital New Delhi. It is the longest running Durunto Express in India. It runs through the scenic Konkan Railway. This was the first Duronto express to Kerala and the longest running Duronto express in Indian Railways. It is one of the fastest Duronto express trains.

== Coach composition ==
The train service runs using an LHB rake composed of 6 Non-AC sleeper coaches, 10 AC three-tier coaches, 2 AC two-tier coaches, 1 AC first-class, 1 pantry car, 1 EOG car, and 1 SLR car making a total of 22 coaches. It runs for approximately 41hr 55m for one-way journey.

== Route ==
It halts at Ernakulam Junction, Kozhikode, Mangaluru Junction, Madgaon Junction, Ratnagiri, Panvel Junction, Vasai Road, Surat railway station, Vadodara Junction, Ratlam Junction, Kota Junction, and Hazrat Nizamuddin.

== Traction ==
The train is hauled by a Erode or Royapuram based WAP-7 locomotive throughout its journey.

== Gallery ==
Few snippets of this Superfast Express train:-

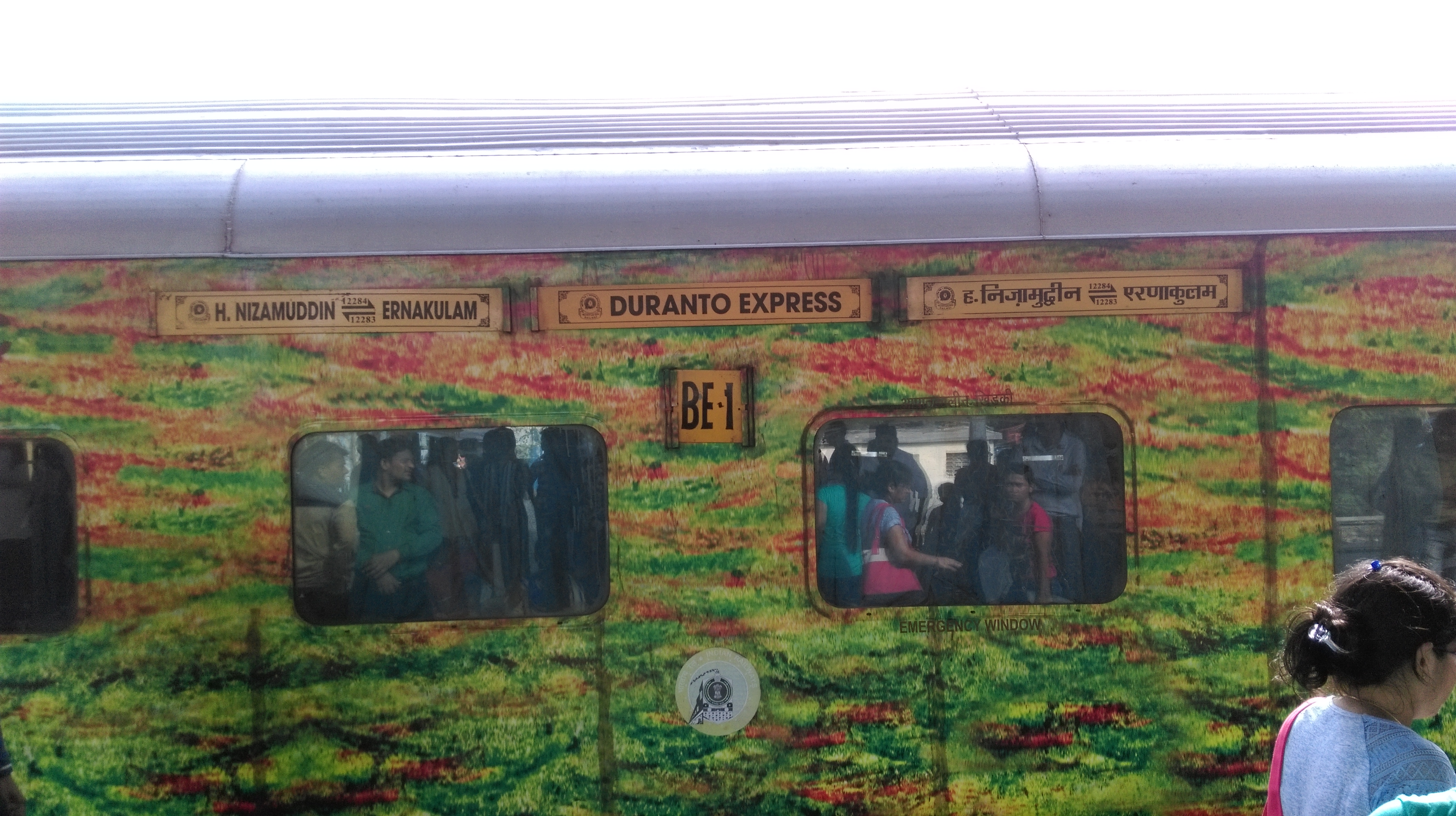
AC 3 tier

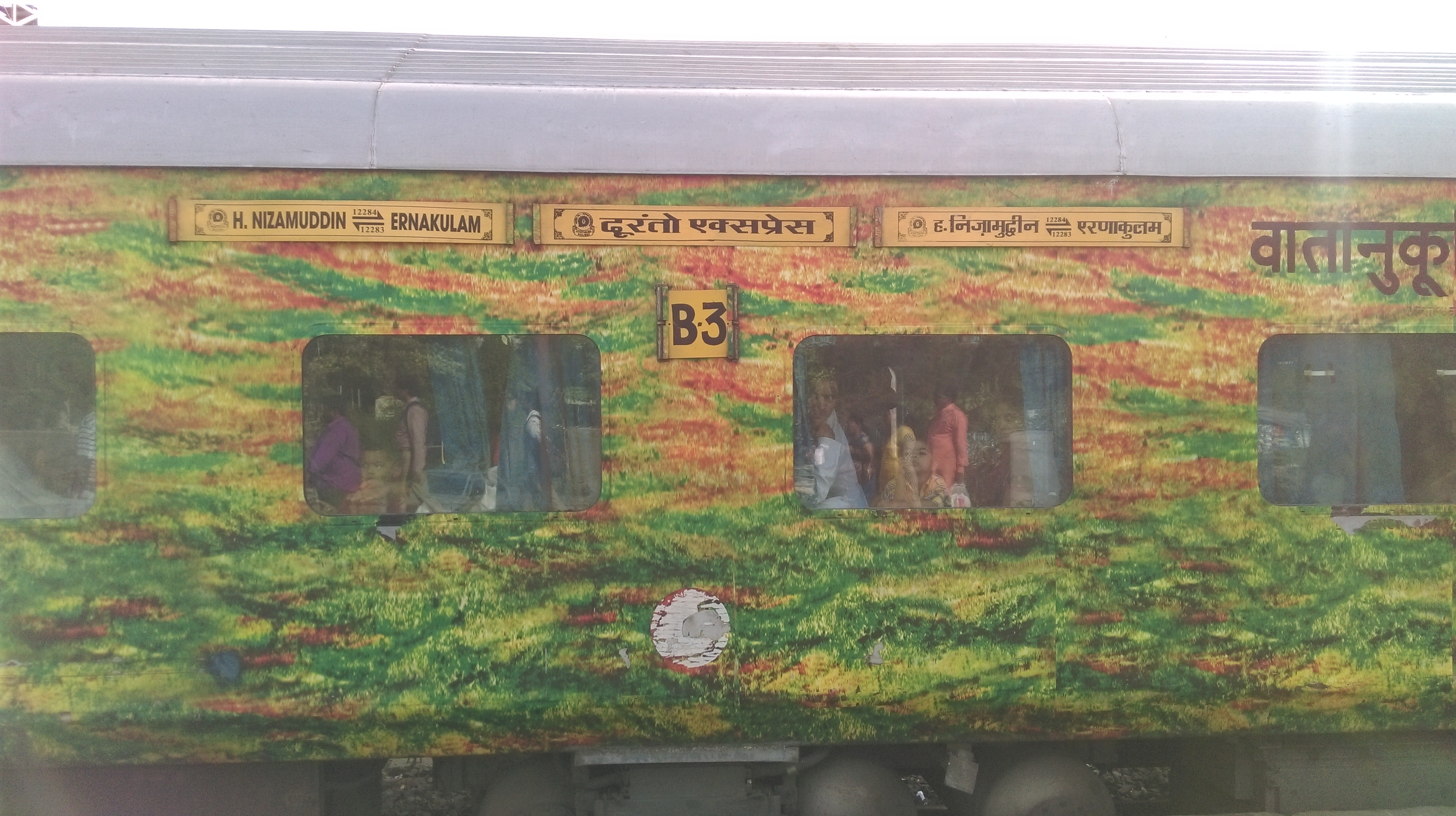
AC 3 tier

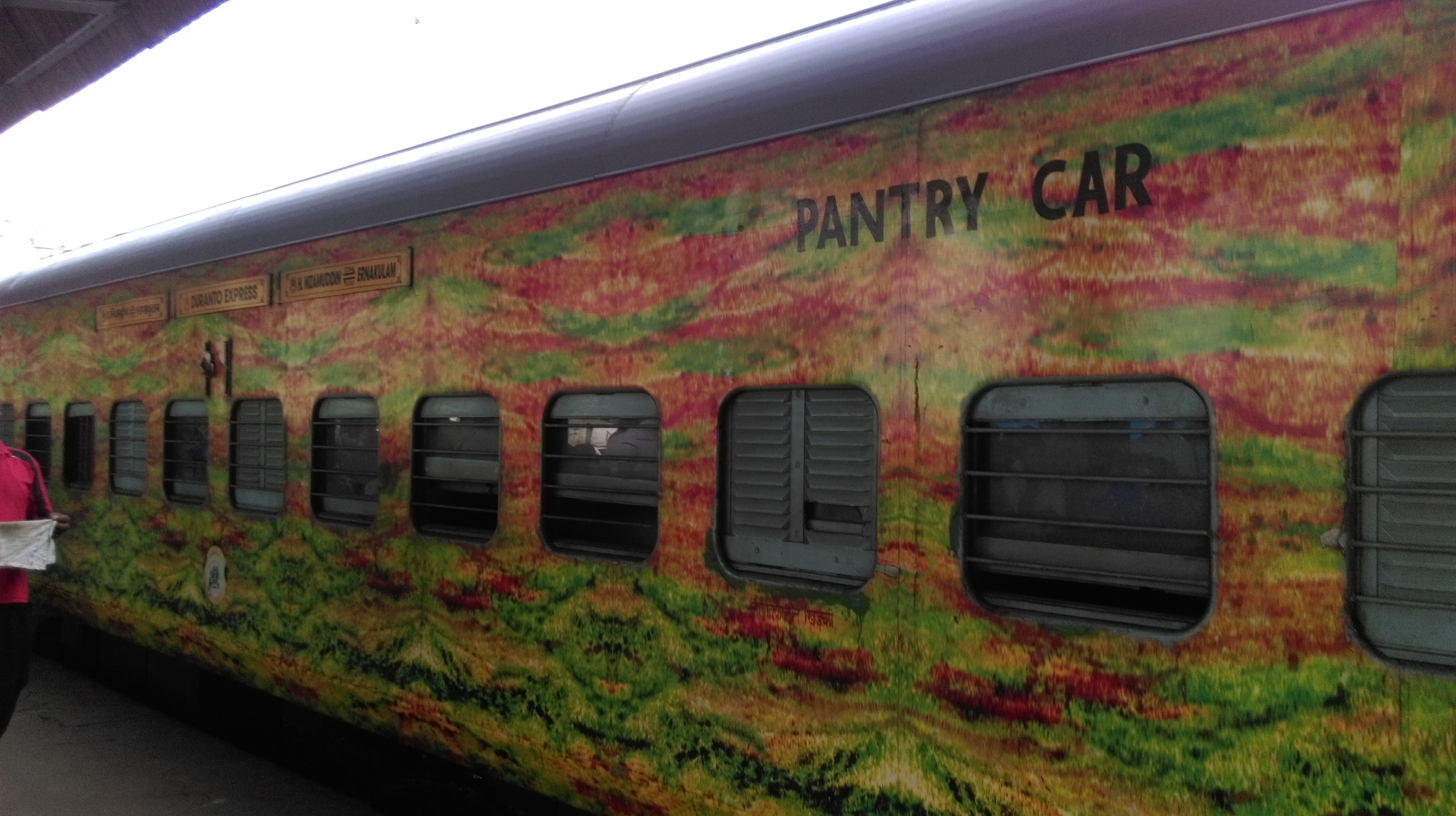
Pantry Car

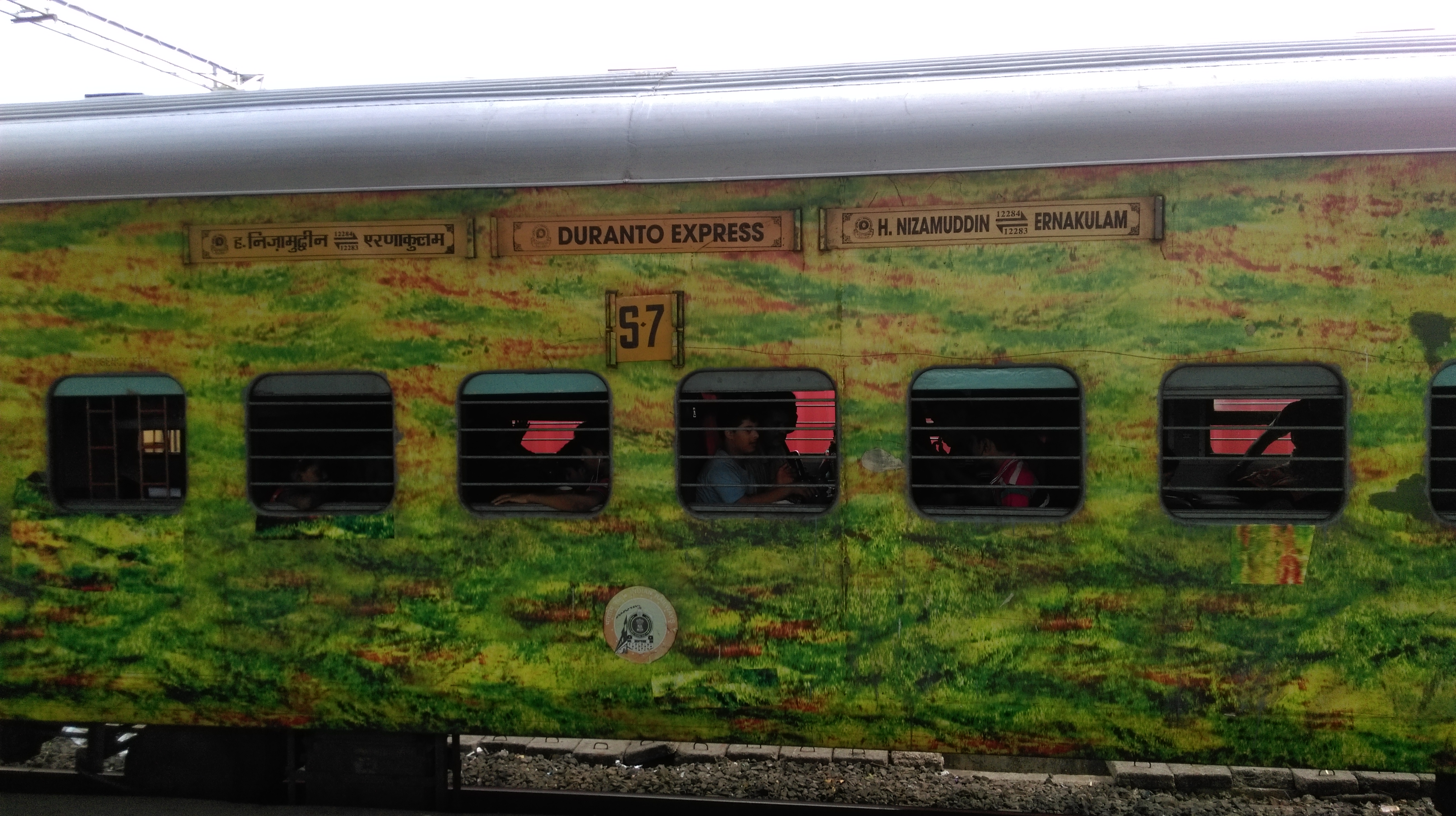
Sleeper Class

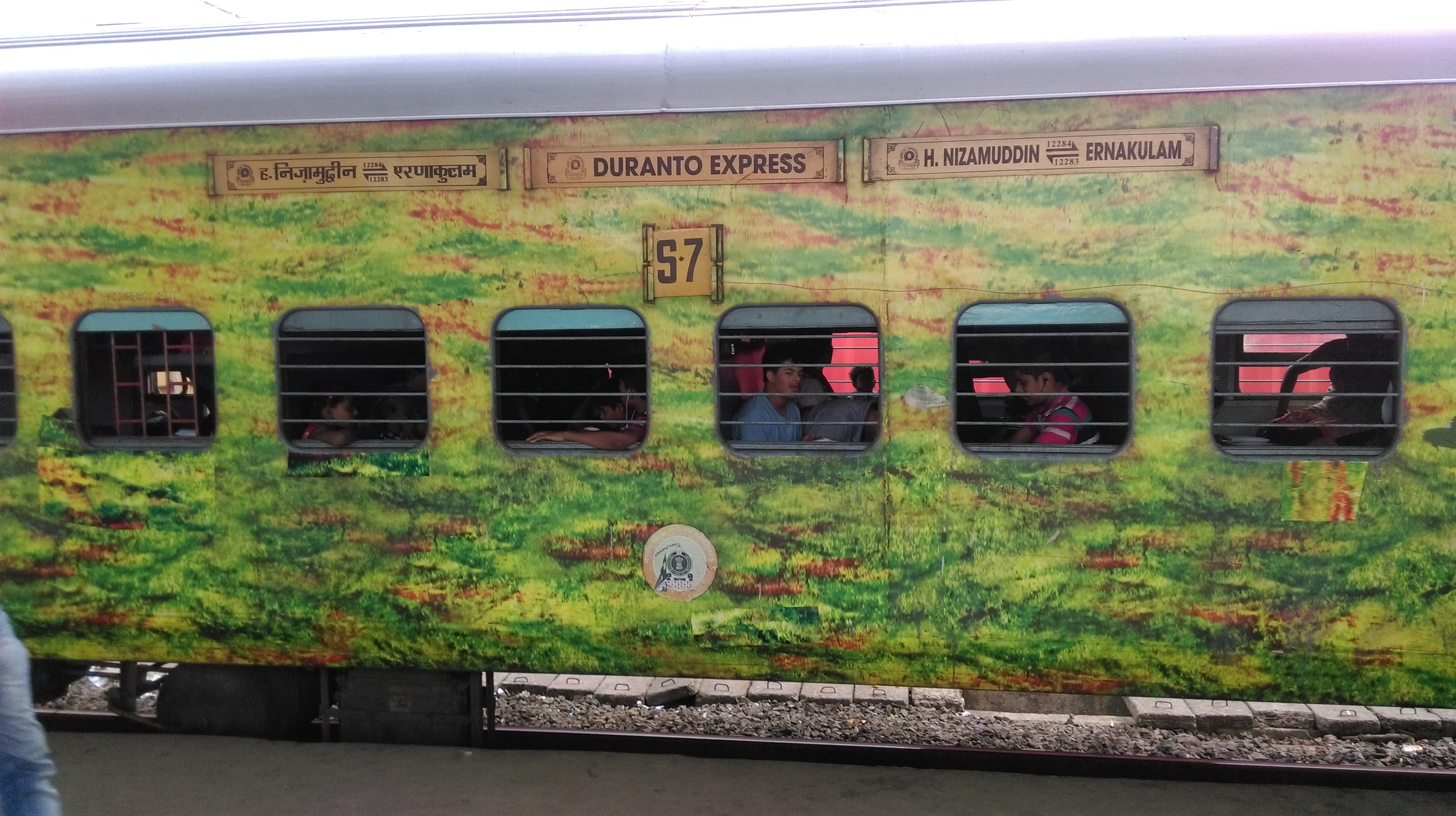
Sleeper class

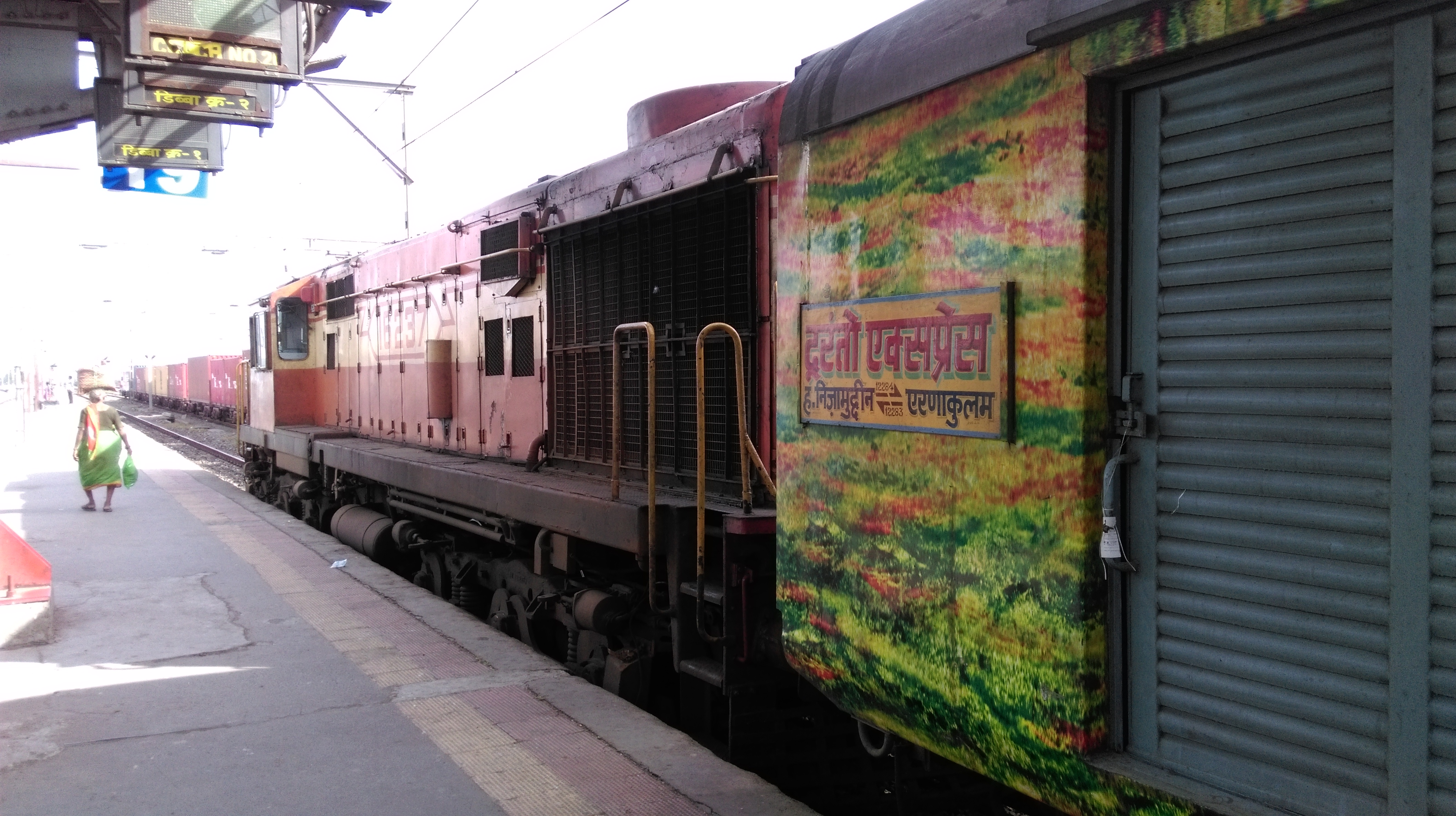
12284 ERS NZM Duronto being pulled by ERS Alco
