= Sellappan Nirmala =

Indian doctor (born 1952)

Sellappan Nirmala (born 1952 or 1953) is an Indian doctor who discovered the first case of HIV in India in 1986. In 1985, aged 32, she was working as a microbiology student in Chennai (Madras) and for her dissertation, began collecting blood samples and having them tested for HIV; among them were the first samples collected in India to test positive.

== Career ==
Nirmala was raised in a traditional Indian family and encouraged to go into medical research by her husband. She had the idea of researching the virus from her mentor, Professor Suniti Solomon, in response to formal tracking of HIV in the US, which began in 1982. At the time, HIV was still a taboo subject in the country. Blood samples had been collected from Mumbai and Pune without positive results.

The research plan involved taking around 200 samples of blood from groups suspected to be at high risk, including 80 gathered by Nirmala. Because of a lack of testing facilities in Chennai, Solomon arranged for them to be investigated at the Christian Medical College & Hospital in Vellore, 200 kilometres (120 miles) away. The samples confirmed that HIV was active in India. The information was transferred to the Indian Council of Medical Research, which told the prime minister Rajiv Gandhi and Tamil Nadu health minister H. V. Hande. HIV subsequently became an epidemic in the country.

Nirmala submitted her dissertation, Surveillance for Aids in Tamil Nadu, in March 1987 and later joined the King Institute of Preventive Medicine and Research in Chennai. She retired in 2010.
