= Ernakulam Junction railway station =

NSG-2 classified railway station in Kerala, India

Ernakulam Junction Ernakulam South
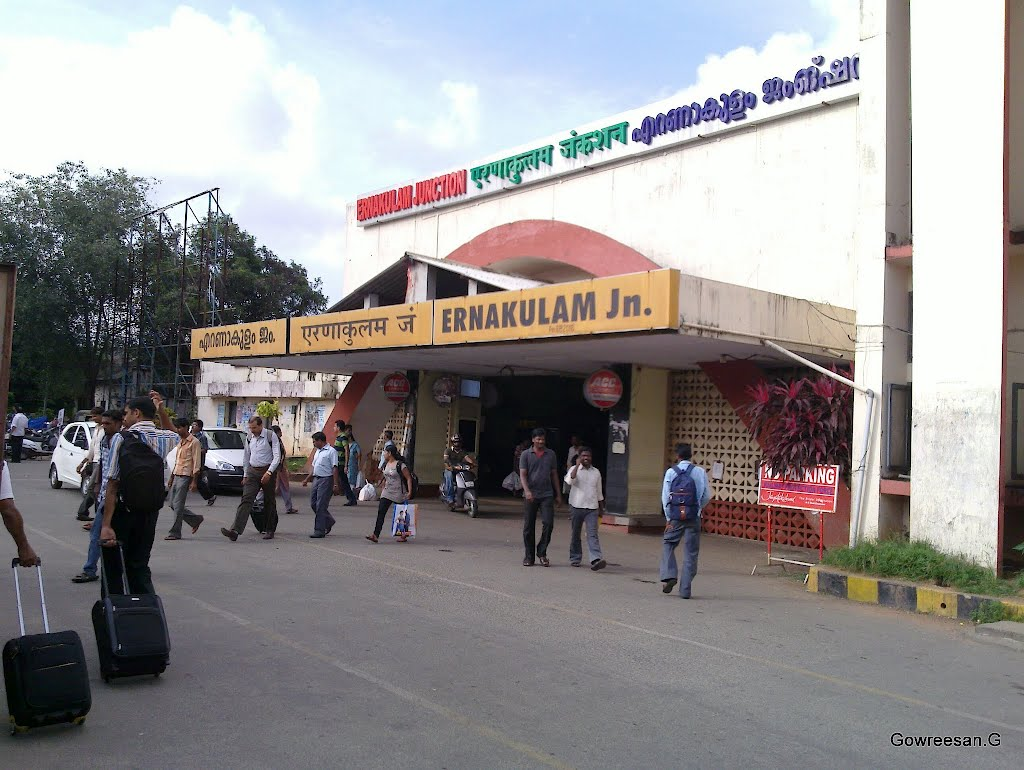
- Main entrance of Ernakulam Junction before the reconstruction in 2022

General information
- Other names: Ernakulam South
- Location: South Railway Station Road, Ernakulam South, Kochi, Kerala, India
- Coordinates: 9.96885°N 76.29160°E
- System: Indian Railways station
- Owner: Indian Railways
- Operator: Southern Railway zone
- Lines: Ernakulam–Kottayam–Kollam line, Shoranur–Cochin Harbour section Ernakulam–Alappuzha–Kayamkulam; Ernakulam Junction–Cochin Harbour Terminus
- Platforms: 6
- Tracks: 10
- Connections: Blue Line Ernakulam South

Construction
- Structure type: Standard Indian Style
- Depth: 15 ft (4.6 m)
- Parking: Available
- Cycle facilities: available
- Accessible: Disabled access

Other information
- Status: Active
- Station code: ERS
- Fare zone: Southern Railway zone
- Classification: NSG-2

History
- Opened: 1932; 94 years ago
- Rebuilt: 1946; 80 years ago (first); August 2025; 14 months ago (second&Postponed Due to Some Contract Issues )
- Electrified: 2000; 26 years ago

Passengers
- 2018–19: 25,587 per day Annual passengers – 93,39,152 (2021–22) ▲100%
- Rank: 3 (in Kerala); 2 (in Trivandrum division)
Location
- Interactive map

Ernakulam Junction railway station (also known as Ernakulam South, station code: ERS) is an NSG–2 category Indian railway station in Thiruvananthapuram railway division of Southern Railway zone. It is the main railway terminus in the city of Kochi, Kerala. Controlling 376 train routes at a time, it is one of busiest railway stations in South India and an important railway hub. At ₹158 crore (equivalent to ₹214 crore or US$22 million in 2026) in financial year 2018–19, it is the second largest in terms of passenger revenues in Kerala and the fifth largest in Southern Railway. It is also the first fully disabled-friendly railway station in India.

== History ==
Ernakulam Junction was first opened as Ernakulam South in 1932 when the metre-gauge line then terminating at Ernakulam Terminus railway station (ERG) was extended from Pachalam to the Cochin Harbour Terminus on the Willingdon Island for proximity to the Kochi Port. Ernakulam North, Perumanur (later closed), Mattanchery Halt and CHTS were the newly opened stations on the route. In 1946 the station was converted into broad gauge as part of the Shoranur–CHTS line, linking it directly to the rest of India via the Mangalore–Jolarpet mainline at Shoranur Jn. In 1956 the Ernakulam–Kottayam metre-gauge line was opened and further extended to Kollam in 1958, joining to the Kollam–Trivandrum line, connecting Ernakulam with Trivandrum for the first time. This was what made Ernakulam Junction rise to prominence, which was until then just a small wayside station en route to the much busier Cochin Harbour Terminus station.

Since the opening of the Kottayam line made the station a junction, it was renamed Ernakulam Junction, and the Ernakulam North station was renamed to Ernakulam Town. Until 1979 when the Kottayam line was converted into broad gauge, Ernakulam junction had both broad and metre-gauge tracks. As the coastal line to Alappuzha was opened in 1989, Ernakulam Junction rose to the status of the most premier railway station in central Kerala.

=== Renovation ===
On 13 July 2022, a ₹299.9 crore budget was approved for the station's renovation. The renovation entails the erection of multi-story structures spanning a total built-up area of roughly 62,000 square metres on the station's eastern and western faces. On the eastern side, a different, three-story structure is being constructed. It will feature administrative offices, a hospital, and a passenger booking facility. A projected four-story structure is located on the western side. It will have waiting areas, ticketing areas and a commercial area with lifts and escalators connecting it to all stations. Kerala's traditional architecture will be reflected in the station building's façade design. A ticketing area, waiting lounges, and commercial space will all be housed in the renovated West Terminal structure. Most notably, a skywalk will connect the complex to the Ernakulam South Metro Station. In total, 22 lifts and 14 escalators will be added to the current fleet. There will be set up multi-level parking (MLCP) with space for 108 automobiles and 90 two-wheelers in addition to EV charging stations.

On 29 September 2024, The railways announced plans to expand platform number 2 at the station to accommodate 24 coach trains. Future extensions of other platforms are being considered as well.

== Layout ==
Ernakulam Junction has four lines branching off from it to four different directions:

- North towards Chennai/Bangalore/Hyderabad (via Palakkad) and Mumbai/Ahmedabad (via Kozhikode and Konkan Railway)
- South towards Thiruvananthapuram via Alappuzha–Kollam
- South-west towards Willingdon Island and Cochin Harbour Terminus (CHTS)
- East towards Thiruvananthapuram via Kottayam–Kollam

The station has six platforms to handle long-distance trains and local trains and two entrances (the Main entry and the Eastern entry). It does have all amenities expected out of a major junction including a paid air-conditioned lounge with free Wi-Fi, a library, rest room, children's play areas etc. However, the station lacks the spread-out roominess and large built-up area of similarly large stations. Ernakulam Junction was the first railway station in Kerala to have an escalator. It was installed on 9 September 2013. Currently all its platforms are served by escalators.

== Important trains originating from Ernakulam Junction ==
The following trains starting from Ernakulam Junction station:

Train name
KSR Bengaluru–Ernakulam Junction Vande Bharat Express
Ernakulam–H.Nizamuddin Duronto Express
Mangala Lakshadweep Express
Lokmanya Tilak Terminus–Ernakulam Duronto Express
Ernakulam–Bilaspur Express
Ernakulam–Okha Express
Ernakulam–Banaswadi Superfast Express
Ernakulam-Karaikal Tea Garden Express
Bangalore City–Ernakulam Intercity Express
Ernakulam–Patna Express (via Tirupati)
Ernakulam–Patna Express (via Chennai)
Dharti Aaba AC Superfast Express
Howrah–Ernakulam Antyodaya Express
Ernakulam–Tatanagar Express
Ernakulam–Trivandrum Vanchinad(via Kottayam)
Ernakulam–Nizamudeen Millennium Express (via Palakkad)
Marusagar Express
Ernakulam-Barauni Raptisagar Express
Ernakulam–Kannur Intercity Express
Pune–Ernakulam Express
Poorna Express

== See also ==
- Ernakulam Town railway station
- Cochin Harbour Terminus
- Thiruvananthapuram Central
- Ernakulam Terminus railway station
