= Siddapura, Bengaluru =

Siddapura lalbagh siddapura
- Belongs to 1st block jayanagar
- Country: India
- State: Karnataka
- District: bangalore

Languages
  - Official: Kannada
- Time zone: UTC+5:30 (IST)
- Nearest city: Jayanagar, Bangalore

Siddapura is the name of two localities within the limits of the Bruhat Bangalore Mahanagara Palike (BBMP). One is situated near Jayanagar in Bangalore and another village is the suburb of Whitefield. The Siddapura at Jayanagar is known for the few plant nurseries it houses. It is common to see government establishments and citizens procure potted plants from these nurseries. It is close to gate number 3, of the Lalbagh botanical garden, which is also known as Lalbagh Siddapura Gate. This area is primarily serviced by BMTC bus number 13 and 27A.
