= YRGCARE =

Indian non-profit organisation

YR Gaitonde Centre for AIDS Research and Education (YRGCARE)
- Founded: 1993
- Founder: Suniti Solomon
- Founded at: Chennai
- Type: NGO
- Headquarters: Chennai
- Location: India
- Key people: Sunil Solomon

YR Gaitonde Centre for AIDS Research and Education (YRGCARE) is a non-profit organisation in India working in the domain of HIV/AIDS. The organisation was founded by Dr Suniti Solomon in 1993. As reported in 2018, YRGCARE had provided HIV prevention and treatment related services to about 21,000 people in India who were infected by HIV. After Dr Suniti Solomon died, Dr Sunil Solomon leads YRGCARE.

== History ==
YRGCARE started from three people and provided basic testing facilities and has since expanded to conducting behavioural and medical research. It provides care and support to people living with HIV/AIDS.

== YRGCARE ID Lab ==
Established in 2000, the Infectious Diseases (ID) laboratory of YRGCARE is housed at VHS Hospital campus in Chennai. The lab is in collaboration with the Johns Hopkins University, Brown University and is supported by a grant from the National Institutes of Health. The lab conducts biomedical research in the fields of the basic sciences.
