= Suniti Solomon =

Indian physician

- Born: Suniti Gaitonde; 14 October, 1939; Chennai, Tamil Nadu, India
- Died: 28 July 2015 (aged 75); Chennai, Tamil Nadu, India
- Education: Madras Medical College
- Spouse: Victor Solomon (died 2006)
- Children: 1

Suniti Solomon (née Gaitonde; 14 October 1939 – 28 July 2015) was an Indian physician and microbiologist who pioneered AIDS research and prevention in India after having diagnosed the first Indian AIDS cases among the Chennai sex workers in 1986 along with her student Sellappan Nirmala . She founded the YR Gaitonde Centre for AIDS Research and Education in Chennai. The Indian government conferred the National Women Bio-scientist Award on her. On 25 January 2017, the Government of India awarded her the Padma Shri for medicine for her contributions towards diagnosis and treatment of HIV.

== Early life and education ==
Suniti Solomon (née Gaitonde), was born in a Maharashtrian Hindu family of the leather traders in Chennai. She was the seventh child in a family of eight and was the only daughter. In a 2009 interview she said she became interested in medicine from the yearly health officer visits to their home for vaccinations.

She studied medicine at Madras Medical College and then was trained in pathology in the UK, the U.S. and Australia until 1973 when she and her husband, Victor Solomon, returned to Chennai, because "she felt her services were more needed in India." She did her doctorate in microbiology and joined the faculty of the Institute of Microbiology in Madras Medical College afterwards.

== Career ==
In her earlier career life abroad, Solomon had worked as a junior physician at King's College Hospital, London. After returning to India, Solomon worked as a microbiologist at Madras Medical College and rose to the rank of professor. She followed the literature about the clinical descriptions of AIDS in 1981, discovery of HIV in 1983 and by 1986 decided to test 100 female sex workers, as India had no openly gay community. Six of the one hundred blood samples turned out to be HIV positive. Solomon later sent the samples to Johns Hopkins University in Baltimore for a retest which confirmed the result. This discovery became the first HIV documentation in India. Since then, Solomon decided to dedicate her life working on HIV/AIDS research, treatment, and awareness. She has described how people shunned HIV infected persons; even her husband did not want her "to work with HIV-positive patients," most of whom at that time were homosexuals, those who self-injected drugs and sex workers. Solomon replied by "you have to listen to their stories and you wouldn’t say the same thing." Solomon was one of the first people who spoke openly about HIV and the stigma along it, she once stated "what is killing people with AIDS more is the stigma and discrimination."

From 1988 to 1993, Solomon set up the first AIDS Resource Group in India founded at the MMC and ran a variety of AIDS research and social services. The group was also the first comprehensive HIV/AIDS facility in India before any private and public sectors. In 1993, Solomon established the 'Y R Gaitonde Centre for AIDS Research and Education' (YRG CARE) after the name of her father. It was one of India's first places for voluntary HIV counselling and testing. As of 2015, 100 outpatients were seen there daily and 15 000 patients were on regular follow-up. The centre and her work there have been described as "significant factors in slowing the [HIV] epidemic". She also provide education to other doctors and students about HIV and its treatment. She obtained the name of "the AIDS doctor of Chennai" and served as the President of the AIDS Society of India.

Solomon also collaborated in international research studies, including a multi-country HIV/STD Prevention Trial at the US National Institute of Mental Health, the HIV Prevention Trials Network run by the US National Institute of Allergy and Infectious Diseases, an NIH study of the HIV stigma in health care settings in Southern India, and a Phase III study of 6% CS GEL, a candidate microbicide of CONRAD (organization).

== Personal life ==
Solomon met her husband, Victor Solomon, a cardiac surgeon, when studying medicine at Madras College. She followed his travels to the UK, US and Australia. He died in 2006. Their son Sunil Solomon is an epidemiologist at Johns Hopkins University in Baltimore. She was diagnosed with pancreatic cancer 2 months before her death on July 28, 2015, in her home in Chennai, at the age of 76.

== Awards ==
Solomon received the following awards:

- In 2001, award for pioneering work on HIV/AIDS by the state-run medical varsity.
- In 2005, a Lifetime Achievement Award for her work on HIV by Tamil Nadu State AIDS Control Society
- In 2006, DMS (Honoris Cusa) by Brown University, USA
- In 2009, 'National Women Bio-scientist Award' by the Indian ministry of science and technology.
- In 2010, Fellowship of the National Academy of Medical Sciences.
- In 2012, 'Lifetime Achievement Award for Service on HIV/AIDS' by the state-run Dr MGR Medical University in Chennai.
- and several other awards, like the 'Mother Teresa Memorial Award' for education and humanitarian services.
- In 2017, the Government of India announced "Padma Shri" award (posthumous) for her distinguished service in the field of medicine

== Work ==
- Solomon, Suniti; Subramadam, S; Madanagopolan, M (1976). "In vitro sensitivity of enteric bacteria to epicillin, chloramphenicol, ampicillin and furazolidone". Current Medical Research and Opinion. 4 (3): 229–232. doi:10.1185/03007997609109309. PMID 985743.
- Solomon, S; Kumarasamy, N; Jayaker Paul, S A; Venilla, R; Amairaj, R E (1995). "Spectrum of opportunistic infections among AIDS patients in Tamil Nadu, India". International Journal of STD & AIDS. 6 (6): 447–9. doi:10.1177/095646249500600615. PMID 8845406. S2CID 41364414.
- Kumarasamy, N; Solomon, S; Jayaker Paul, S A; Edwin, R; Sridhar, S (1995). "Neurological manifestations in aids patients in South India". Journal of Neuroimmunology. 63 (1): 100. doi:10.1016/0165-5728(96)80989-1. S2CID 53181197.
- Solomon, S; Madhaven, H; Biswas, J; Kumarasamy, N (1997). "Blepharitis and lid ulcer as initial ocular manifestation in acquired immunodeficiency syndrome patients". Indian Journal of Ophthalmology. 45 (4): 233–234. PMID 9567019.
- Solomon, S; Kumarasamy, N; Ganesh, A K; Amairaj, R (1998). "Prevalence and risk factors of HIV-1 and HIV-2 infection in urban and rural areas in Tamil Nadu, India". International Journal of STD & AIDS. 9 (2): 98–103. doi:10.1258/0956462981921756. PMID 9506375. S2CID 24406494.
