= Udaan Trust =

Indian HIV/AIDS organization

Udaan Trust is an Indian non-governmental organisation operating in the state of Maharashtra. It is the first HIV/AIDS organisation founded by homosexuals living with HIV/AIDS. Udaan focuses on issues of sexual health within the homosexual and transgender communities, particularly with regard to the prevention of HIV/AIDS. In order to accomplish this, Udaan provides services such as condom distribution, sex education, counseling, and medical services to at-risk populations.

Udaan also attempts to increase awareness of issues relevant to the rights of homosexual and transgender individuals and people living with HIV/AIDS. The organisation does not merely provide services to these individuals - it is meant to reflect their interests, as Udaan employs MSM, TG, and PLHA people (men who have sex with men, transgender, and people living with HIV/AIDS, respectively). Each of the six members of the board of directors is a person living with HIV.

Udaan is funded through personal donations, and attends to a network of an estimated 1500 people living with HIV. It has offices in Mumbai, Pune, Thane District, Raigad District, Jalgaon, Nashik, and Ahmednagar.

Udaan operates within the framework provided by Avert Society, a joint enterprise of the U.S. and Indian governments. It was among a number of similar organisations criticised as ineffective by India's National Aids Control Organisation (NACO) in June 2011.

== History ==
Udaan Trust founded in 1992, in the state of Maharashtra.

On March 7, 2011, officials of the U.S. Agency for International Development visited Udaan to conduct a review of its work.

On March 13, 2011, Udaan donated two ambulances to the Gurdaspur police and staffed them with drivers and paramedics.
