= Red Ribbon Express =

HIV/AIDS awareness campaign train by the Indian Railways

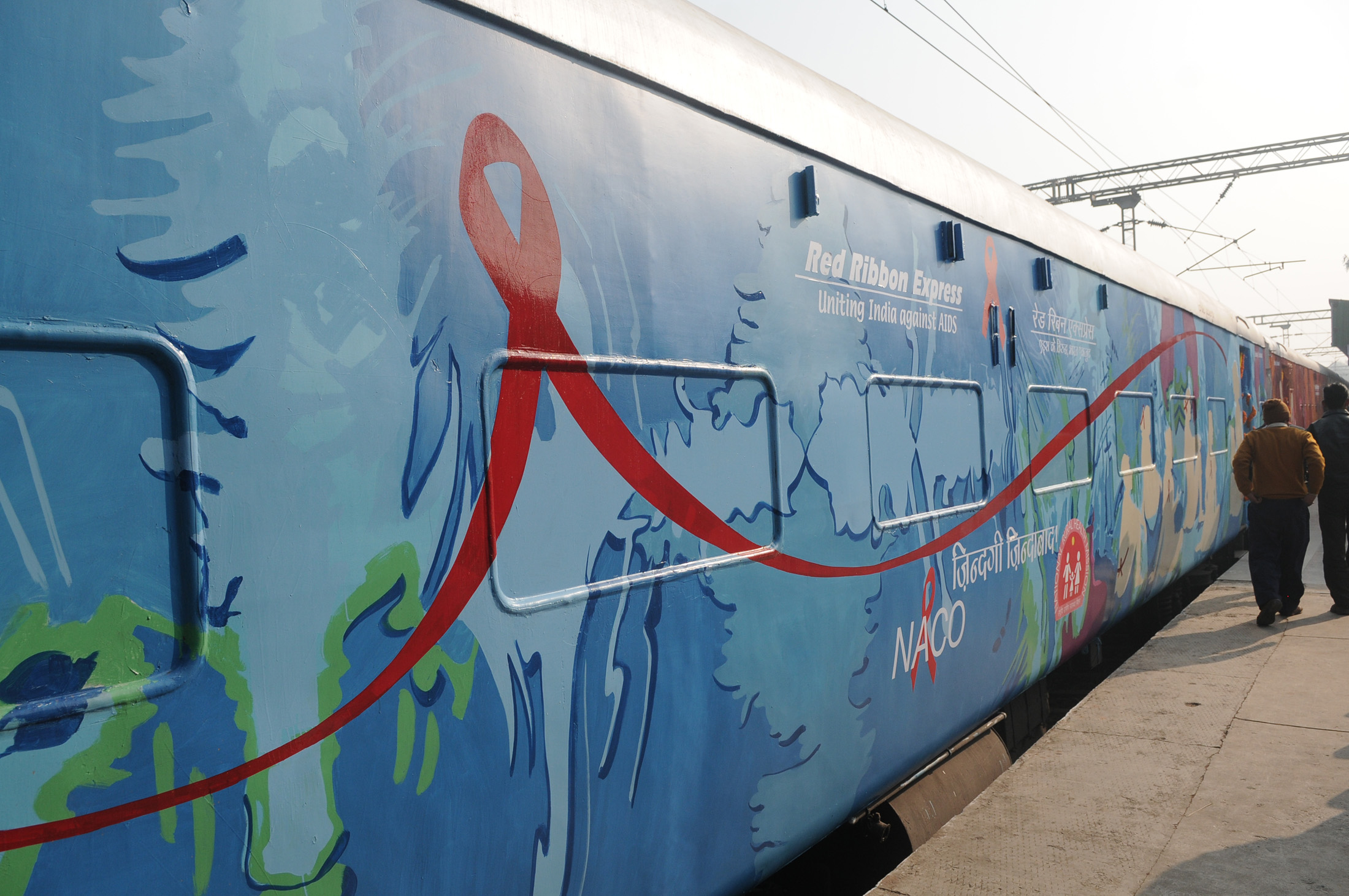
The Red Ribbon Express train, New Delhi, 2012

Red Ribbon Express is an HIV/AIDS awareness campaign train by the Indian Railways. The motto of the Red Ribbon Express is "Embarking on the journey of life".

== History ==
The Red Ribbon Express was launched in India on World AIDS Day, December 1, 2007. The seven coach train was flagged off by United Progressive Alliance Chairperson Sonia Gandhi. The Red Ribbon Express became the first time information and awareness about HIV/AIDS was disseminated through a train service, Indian Railways. Initial talk of the HIV/AIDS awareness train began over two years before its launch. The idea of the Red Ribbon Express was developed by the Rajiv Gandhi Foundation, the National AIDS Control Organisation and Nehru Yuva Kendra Sangathan in 2004.

The Red Ribbon Express' second phase was flagged off by Sonia Gandhi on World AIDS Day, 2009. This second phase aimed to reach out to a larger portion of the rural poor and the government hoped that more people would get tested and treated. The train was designed and fabricated by JWT (Delhi Office, INDIA). The train was designed and fabricated by DESIGN C (JWT). It was operated and maintained whole year during phase-1(2007–08) and phase-2(2009–10). Dr. Daman Ahuja (National Incharge- Field Planning) from NACO has coordinated the Community Mobilization part all across the three phases of its run across the country.

== Campaign ==
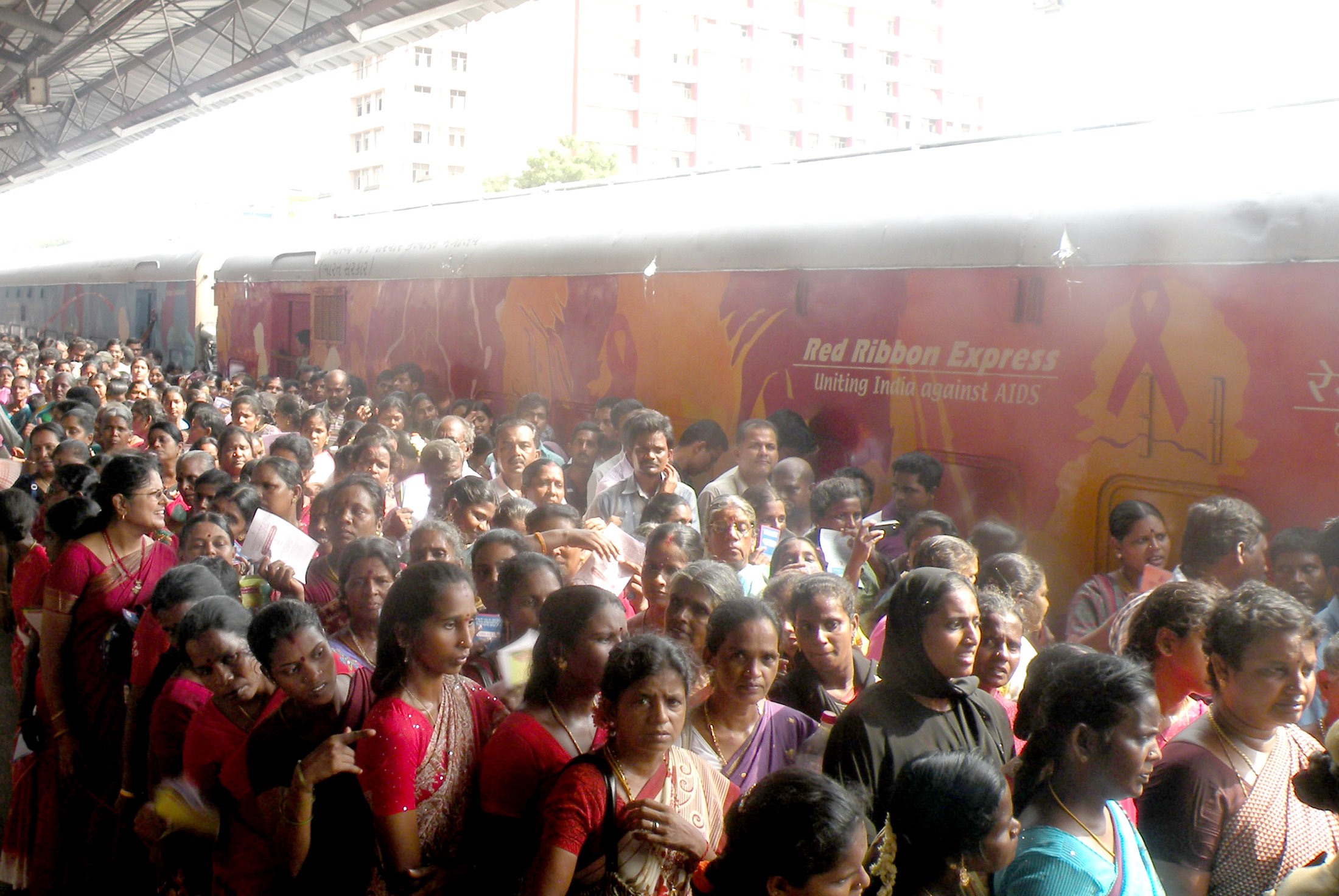
People visiting the Red Ribbon Express, which arrived in Chennai on May 27, 2012

The Red Ribbon Express seeks to spread awareness about HIV/AIDS, promote safe sex and reduce discrimination against AIDS victims in India, especially those in rural regions. India has the third largest population of HIV/AIDS victims worldwide (with over 2.4 million people affected in 2007), after South Africa (5.7 million) and Nigeria (2.6 million).

On-platform and off-site communication activities such as exhibits, street plays and demonstrations are used. Treatment and counselling services are also available on the coach.

The projects target audience was broad, including youth groups, women's groups, student communities, urban slum dwellers and farmers.

In its first phase the train was expected to travel 27,000 km, reaching 180 stations and holding programmes in over 50,000 villages. To reach outer districts, buses and bicycles are used.

The Red Ribbon Express, in its second phase, also devotes information to general health, hygiene and communicable diseases such as swine influenza, tuberculosis and reproductive and child health services.

Government has Launched Third Phase of Red Ribbon Express in New Delhi on January 12, Union Health & Family Welfare Minister Ghulam Nabi Azad launched the National AIDS Control Organisation's Red Ribbon Express Phase III

== Partners ==
Partners involved in the Red Ribbon Express HIV/AIDS campaign include NYKS, NACO, Indian Railways, UNICEF, State AIDS Control Societies (SACS), National Rural Health Mission, Ministry of Railways (India), Hindustan Latex Family Planning Promotion Trust, and the Rajiv Gandhi Foundation.

== Response ==
The response of the Indian public to the Red Ribbon Express has fluctuated since its inception.

In November 2008, The Indian Express reported the response to the Red Ribbon Express' two-day visit to the district of Chandigarh as "overwhelming". The turnout in Chandigarh was over 10,000 people, the highest of any metropolitan area as of November 2008, with over 1,000 visitors receiving guidance from the counsellors on board.

Bombay News.Net also reported an "overwhelming" response in the district of Guntur in 2008.

However, according to NDTV, as of December 2, 2009, the Red Ribbon Express had not generated as much response as expected. To increase the public participation in the Red Ribbon Express campaign, the Indian government began offering medical services at stations.
