= National AIDS Control Organisation =

Indian organization for control of HIV/AIDS

- Abbreviation: NACO
- Formation: 1992
- Purpose: HIV/AIDS control programme in India
- Headquarters: New Delhi
- Parent organisation: Ministry of Health and Family Welfare
- Website: http://www.naco.gov.in

The National AIDS Control Organisation (NACO), established in 1992, is a division of India's Ministry of Health and Family Welfare that provides leadership to the HIV/AIDS control programme in India through 35 HIV/AIDS Prevention and Control Societies, and is "the nodal organisation for formulation of policy and implementation of programs for prevention and control of HIV/AIDS in India.".

Along with drug control authorities, NACO provides joint surveillance of blood bank licensing, blood donation activities and transfusion-transmitted infection testing and reporting.

NACO also undertakes HIV estimations biennially(every 2 years) in collaboration with the Indian Council of Medical Research (ICMR) – National Institute for Research in Digital Health and Data Sciences (NIRDHDS). The first round of HIV estimation in India was done in 1998, while the last round was done in 2017.

In 2010, NACO approved the TeachAids curriculum for use in India, an innovation which represented the first time that HIV/AIDS education could be provided in a curriculum which did not need to be coupled with sex education.

In 2012, National AIDS Control Organisation, along with other 16 organizations working on HIV/AIDS, ran an event "Hijra Habba" under the program of "Pehchan". The event witnessed more than a 100 representatives of the Transgender and the Hijra community from 17 states, interacting with members of the government, NGOs and Civil Society.

== See also ==
- District AIDS Prevention and Control Unit
- HIV/AIDS in India
