= National AIDS Control Programme =

The National AIDS Control Programme (NACP) is a government health organization of Tanzania. It was founded in 1986 and it operates under the purview of the country's Ministry of Health.

The NACP is a policy making board, on the issue of HIV and AIDS in Tanzania.

The National AIDS Control Programme offers information regarding HIV, AIDS, and other STIs to the public. Currently the organization is working toward the 90-90-90 goal set by UNAIDS.
