= Puthur =

Puthur means new village/town/settlement in Malayalam. It may refer to:

== Places and jurisdictions in southern India ==
=== In Kerala state ===
- Puthur (Palakkad), a town near Palakkad
- Puthur (Kasaragod), a census town near Kasaragod
- Puthur, Thrissur, a village in Thrissur district
- Puthoor (Kannur), a village in Kannur district
- Puthoor, near Kollam in Kollam district

=== Elsewhere ===
- Puthur, Tiruchirappalli, part of the city of Tiruchirappalli in Tamil Nadu
- Syro-Malankara Catholic Eparchy of Puthur, an Eastern Catholic (Antiochian Rite) diocese in Karnataka state

== People ==
- Bosco Puthur (born 1946), Indian Catholic prelate of the Syro-Malabar Church
- Ganesh Puthur, Indian poet
- Unnikrishnan Puthur (1933–2014), Indian novelist and short story writer

== See also ==
- Puthur-Vela, the annual festival at the Puthur Thirupuraikkal Bhagavathy temple in Puthur, Kerala, India
- Pudur (disambiguation)
- Puttur (disambiguation)
