= Palakkad–Pollachi line =

Railway line in India

Palakkad - Pollachi line
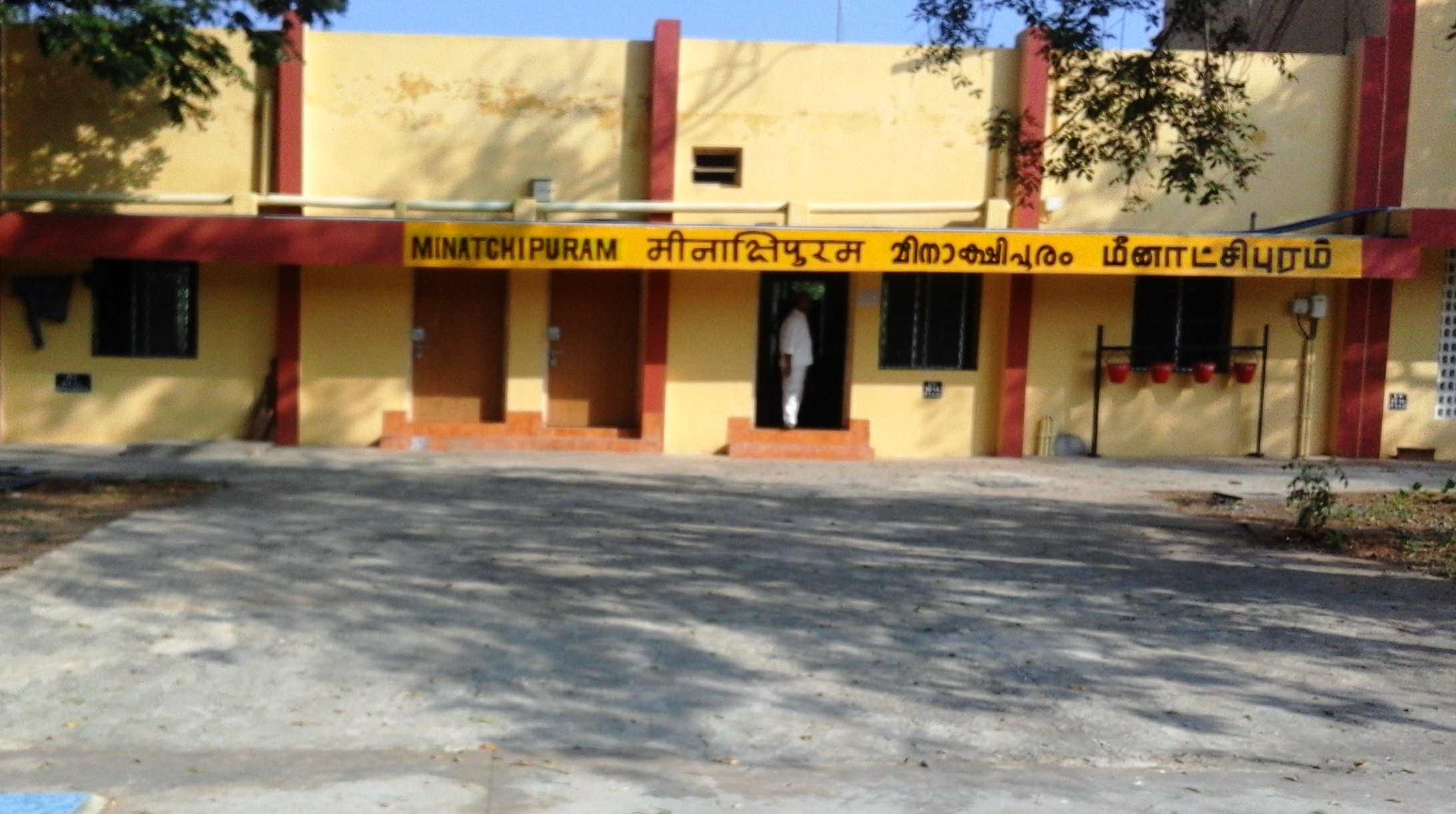
- Meenakshipuram near Pollachi

Overview
- Status: Operational
- Owner: Indian Railways
- Locale: Kerala and Tamilnadu
- Termini: Palakkad Town (PGT); Pollachi Junction (POY)
- Stations: 19

Service
- Type: BROAD GAUGE LINES IN WORLD
- System: Single Line Broad gauge
- Services: 6
- Operator: Southern Railway zone
- Depot: PALAKKAD JUNCTION
- Rolling stock: WAP-4, [WAP 7),(WAP -1)
- Daily ridership: IRCTC & INDIAN RAILWAY (SOUTHERN ZONE )

History
- Opened: 1932; 94 years ago
- Closed: 2008 - 2015

Technical
- Line length: 58 km (36 mi)
- Track length: 58 KM
- Number of tracks: 1
- Character: SINGLE ELECTRIFIED LINE
- Track gauge: 1,676 mm (5 ft 6 in)
- Old gauge: 1,000 mm (3 ft 3 3/8 in)
- Electrification: Yes
- Operating speed: 110 km/h (68 mph)
- Highest elevation: 247 metres above msl

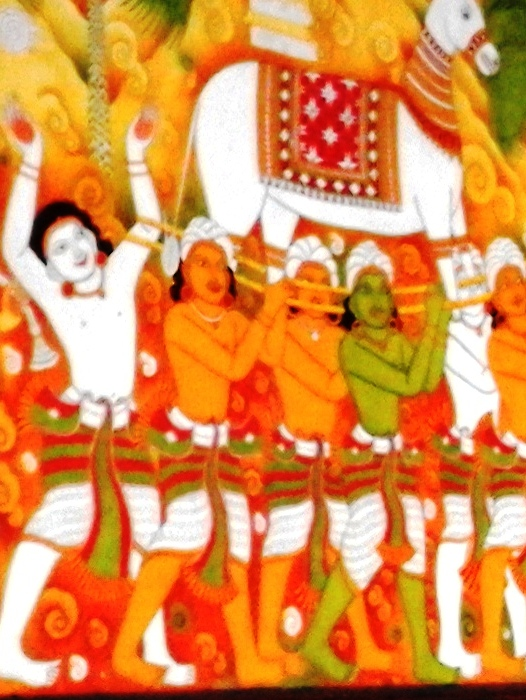
Mural at Olavakkod railway station

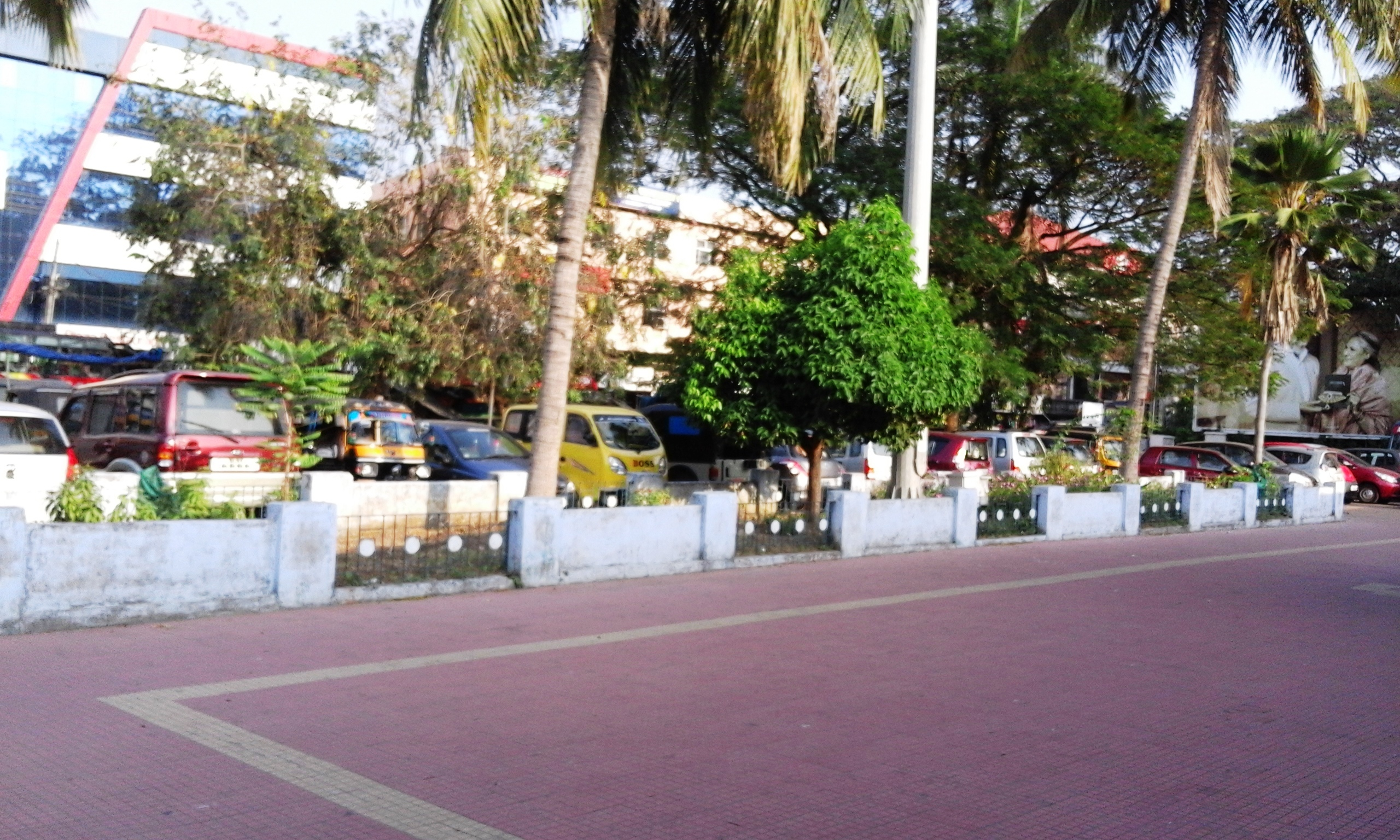
Palakkad town railway station

The Palakkad–Pollachi line is a railway line between Palakkad and Pollachi in the states of Kerala and Tamil Nadu, India which comes under Palakkad railway division of Southern Railway zone. It connects Palakkad with Dindigul - Pollachi railway section.

== History ==
The line was completed as a Metre-gauge railway during British Raj when the region was under Madras Presidency on 1 April 1932. The line was closed for gauge conversion between 10 December 2008 and 25 October 2015.

The section of the line between Palakkad Town and Pollachi completed safety testing on 2 October 2015. The safety inspection that followed conversion of the track was completed on 7 October 2015. The line was approved for passenger train services by the Commissioner of Railway Safety on 8 October 2015.

On 25 October, a load tolerance test was conducted with a train with 42 wagons carrying 3,720 tonnes of fertiliser and goods services resumed. Passenger services resumed on 16 November.

== Gauge ==
The Palakkad–Pollachi line is a 5 ft 6 in (1,676 mm) broad gauge railway line.

Before the conversion which was completed in April 2015, the line was formerly partly 1676 mm-gauge (Palakkad Junction to Palakkad Town) and partly 1,000 mm (3 ft 3 3/8 in) metre gauge, between Palakkad Junction and Pollachi Junction. The maximum permissible speed in this section is 110 kmph.

== Train services ==
The route has only six train services as of present.

Trains (Palakkad Junction- Pollachi Route)

No.	Train No.	Name	From	To	Daily
1.	16622	RMM Weekly Express	PGT	RMM	No
2.	16343	Amritha Express	TVC	RMM	Yes
3.	16731	Tiruchendur Express	PGT	TCN	Yes
4.	22652	PGT MAS SF Express	PGT	MAS	Yes
5.	66623	PGT POY MEMU	PGT	POY	No
6.	16707	TEN Express	MAJN	TEN	No

Trains (Pollachi- Palakkad Junction Route)

No.	Train No.	Name	From	To	Daily
1.	66624	POY PGT MEMU	POY	PGT	No
2.	22651	PGT SF Express	MAS	PGT	Yes
3.	16344	Amritha Express	RMM	TVC	Yes
4.	16732	PGT Express	TCN	PGT	Yes
5.	16708	MAJN Express	TEN	MAJN	No
6.	16621	MAQ Weekly Express	RMM	PGT	No

There are Railway Board approvals to extend KSR Bengaluru–Coimbatore Uday Express to Palakkad via Pollachi.

Other demands:

- Commence new passenger trains on the Dindigul–Pollachi–Palakkad section to serve pilgrims and commuters heading to hubs like Palani and Madurai.
- Extension of Nilambur Road–Palakkad Junction passenger train and Ernakulam - Palakkad MEMU further to Pollachi to create a seamless link between northern/centralKerala and central Tamil Nadu.

These services have not commenced due to alleged regional lobbying in Tamil Nadu.

There are two MEMU services and an Express train to Tiruchirappalli operates from Palakkad Town via Jolarpettai–Shoranur line.

=== Lacunae ===
During Metre-gauge railway period the section had more trains and there is massive criticism over under utilization of network. The lack of rail bypass to enter Shoranur line without loco-reversal at Palakkad Junction is often cited as major bottleneck in development of the line. The lack of pitline in Palakkad is another factor hindering operation of more trains. There is criticism that electrification has reduced beauty and tourist potential of stations like Muthalamada railway station.

== Rolling stock ==
Rolling stock as of 2017:

- WAP-1
- WAP-4
- WAG-7
- WAP -7
- WAG 9
- WAG 12B
- WAG 7&WAG 5HA

Historic rolling stock:

- YDM-4(1983–2009)
- WDP 4D(2019–2022)
- WDG 3A(2019–2021)
- WDM 2(2017–2019)
- WDG 4 (2015–2020)
- WDM 3A.(from 2016 to 2021)
- WDP 3A (until 24 September 2021)

== Stations ==
- Palakkad Junction
- Palakkad Town
- Pudunagaram
- Vadakannikaapuram
- Kollengode
- Muthalamada
- Meenakshipuram
- Annamalai Road (S.G. Pudur)
- Pollachi Junction

== Image gallery ==
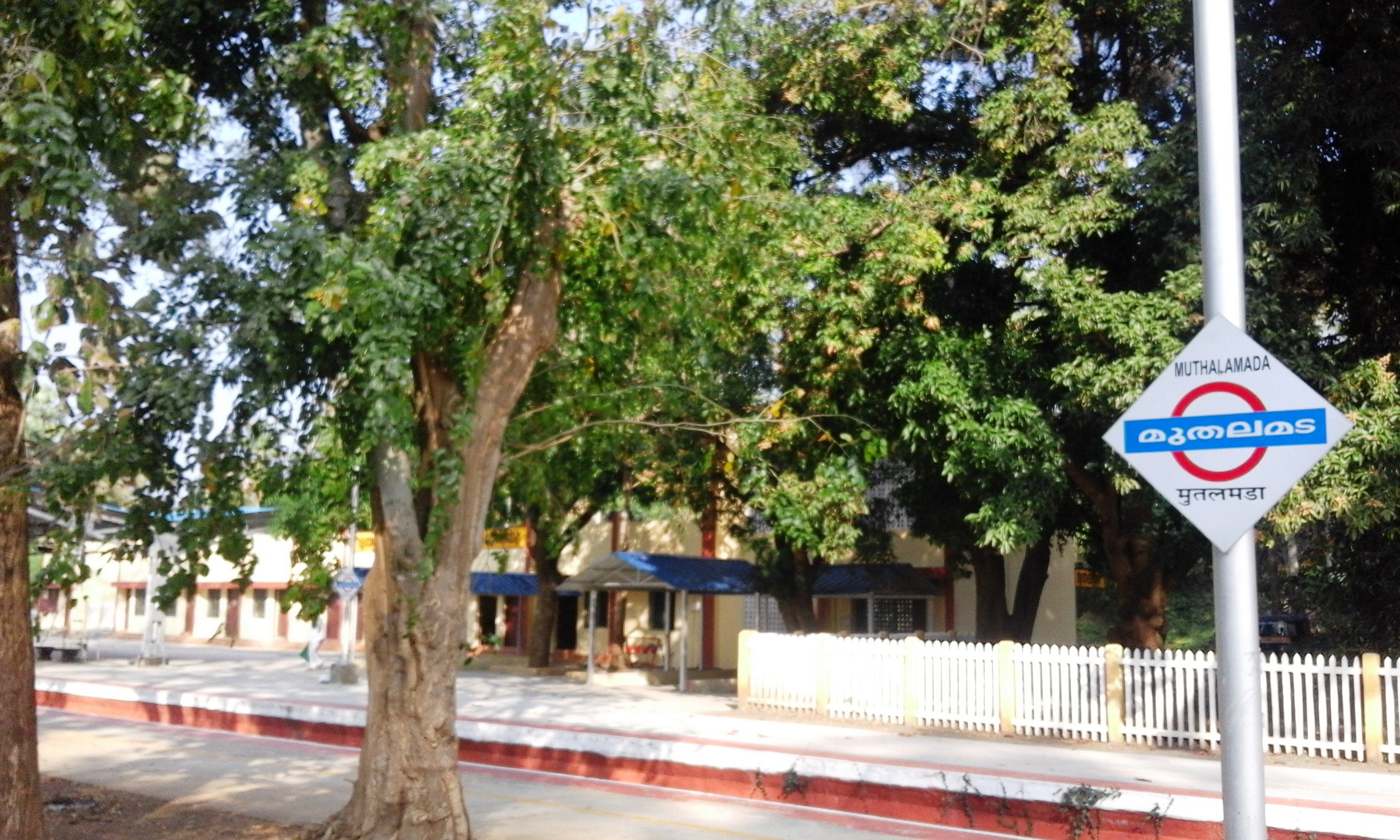
Muthalamada

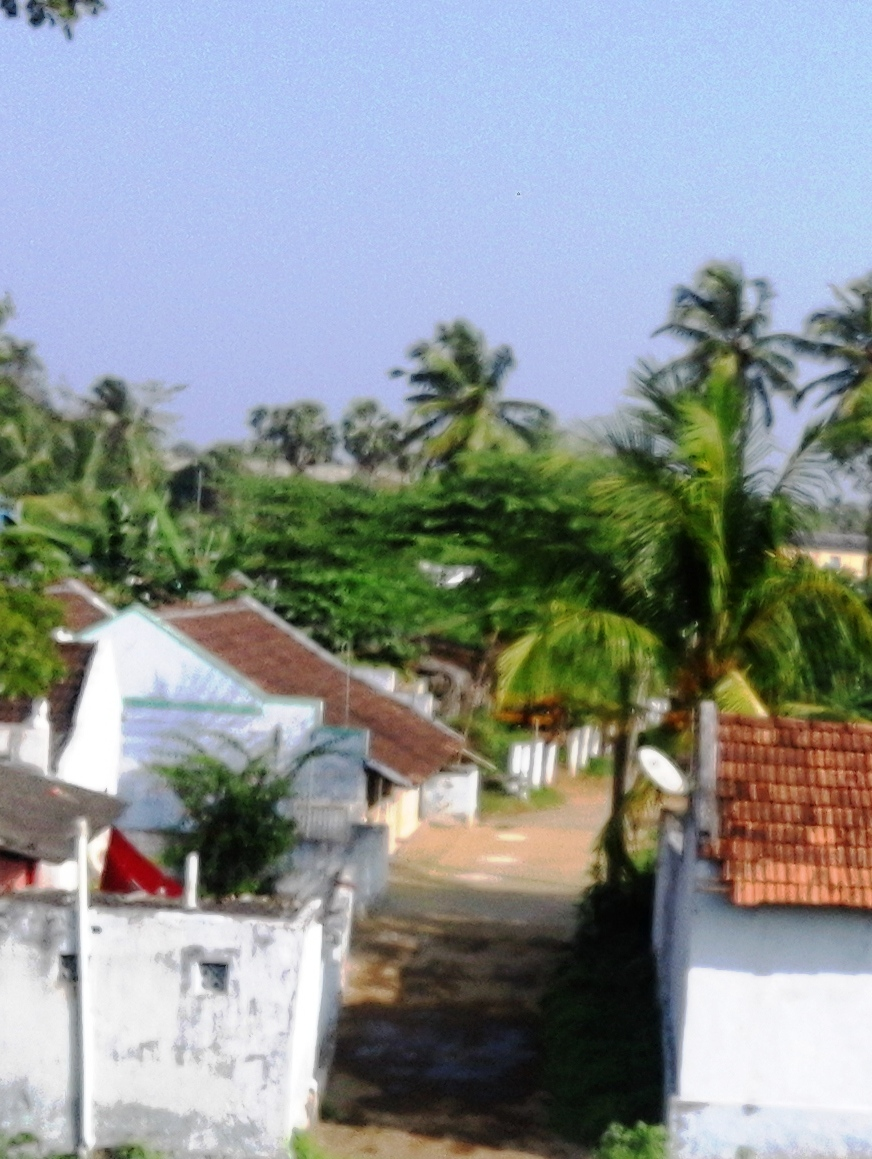
A village on Pollachi line

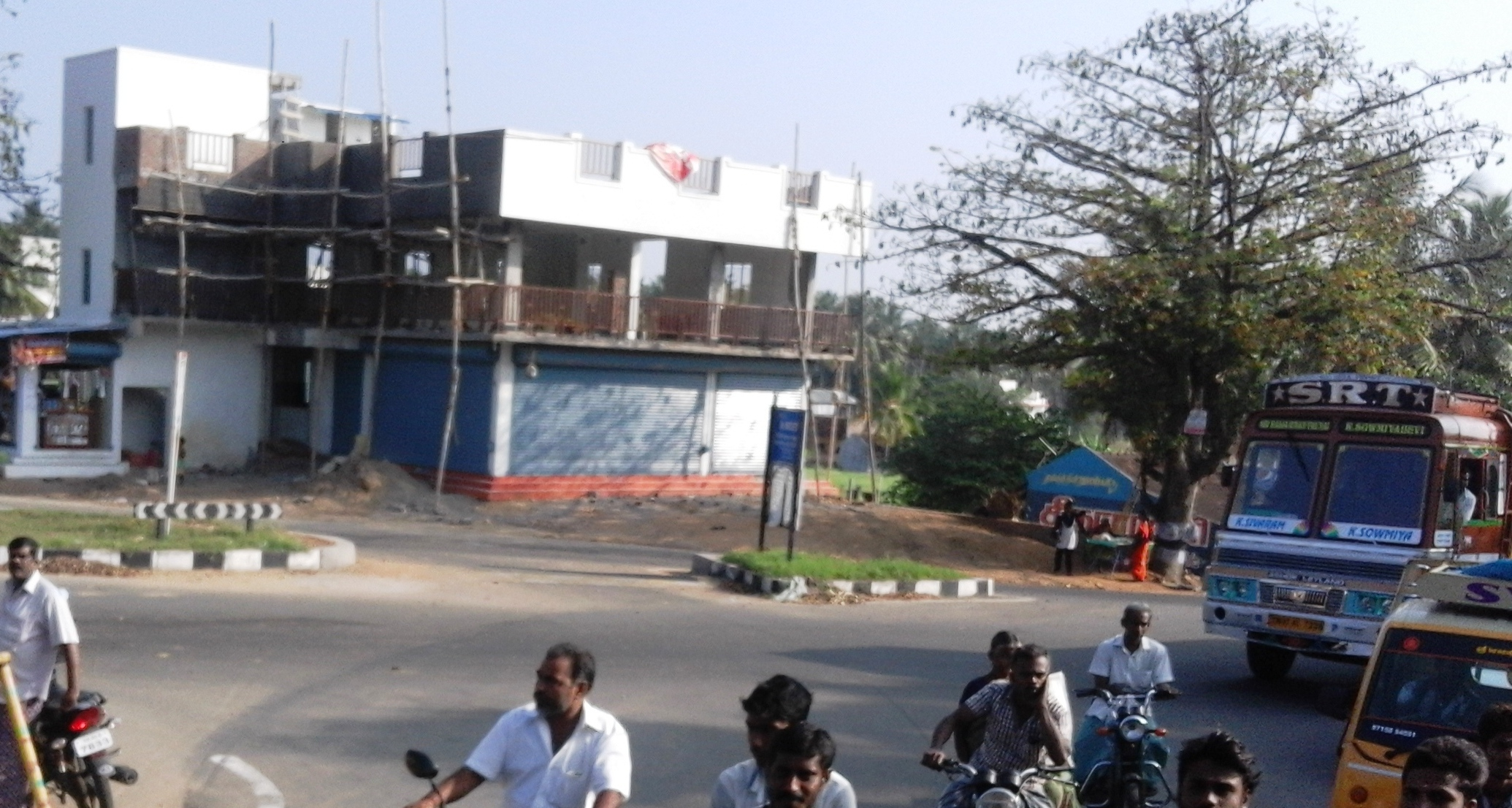
At a level crossing

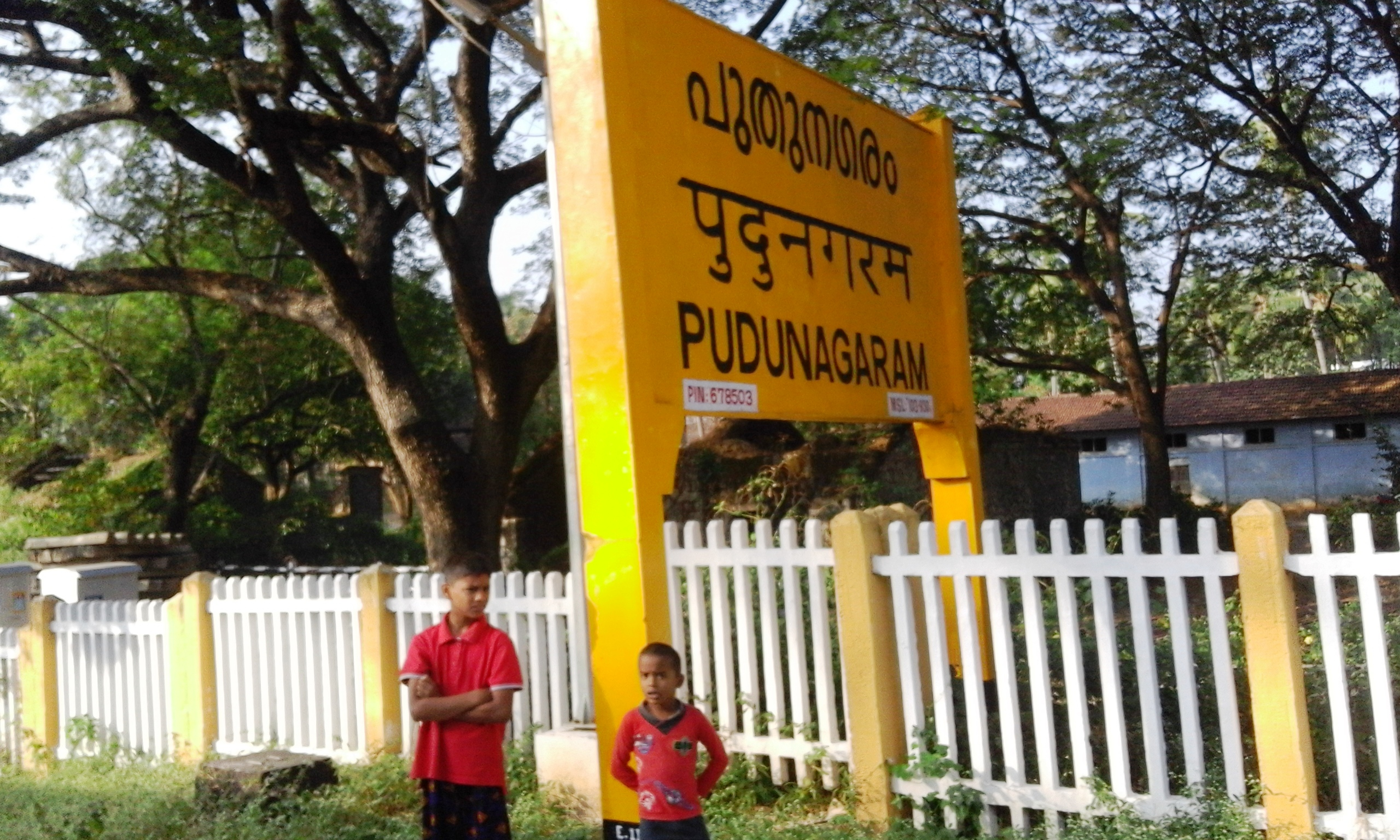
Pudunagaram

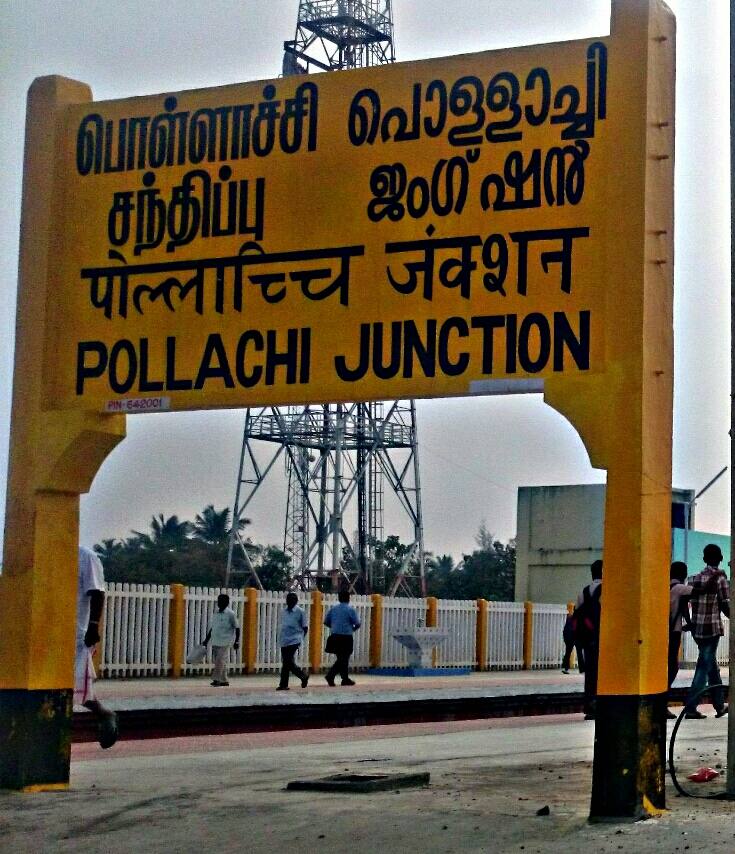
Pollachi junction
