= Palakkad MEMU Shed =

Palakkad MEMU Car Shed
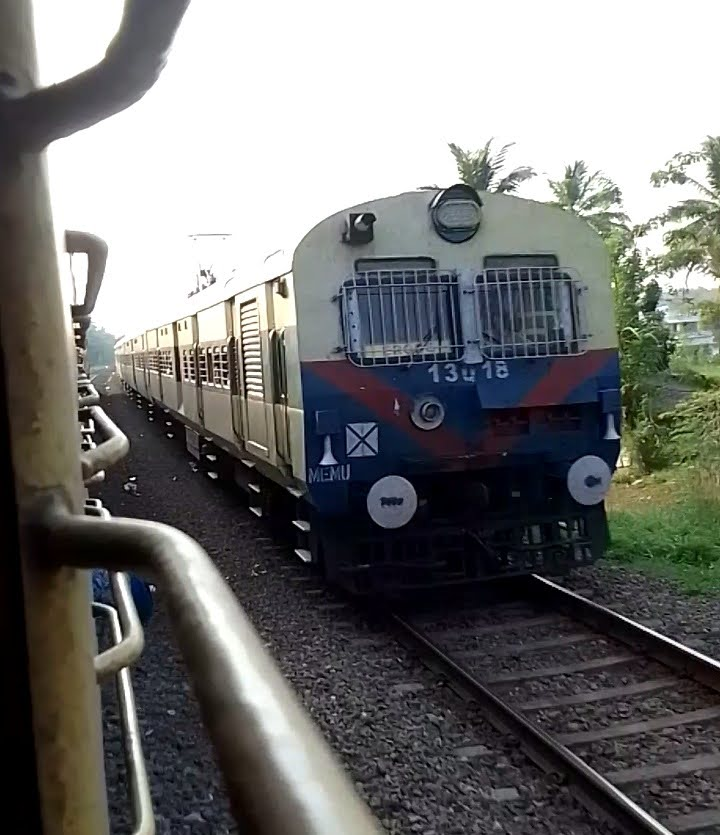
- MEMU departing from Palakkad
- Interactive map of Palakkad MEMU Car Shed

Location
- Location: Palakkad Junction railway station, India
- Coordinates: 10.8025579°N 76.6448605°E

Characteristics
- Owner: Indian Railways
- Operator: Southern Railway zone
- Depot code: MEMU PGT
- Type: Mainline Electric Multiple Unit
- Rolling stock: MEMU
- Routes served: SRR–CAN175.3 km PGTN–ED160.4 km SRR–CBE155.6 km PGT–ERS149.4 km PGTN–CBE58 km

History
- Opened: 1 January 2011 (15 years ago)

Palakkad MEMU Car Shed is an ISO certified motive power depot facility for maintaining MEMU rakes, situated at Palakkad in the Indian state of Kerala. It is one of the four MEMU rake maintenance sheds serving the Southern Railway zone of the Indian Railways and the first MEMU Shed in Kerala.

== History ==
Railway proposed MEMU Car sheds in Palakkad and Kollam in 2008's Indian Railway Budget. Palakkad MEMU shed inaugurated on 1 January 2011. The Kollam MEMU Shed was formally commissioned on 1 December 2013, five years after its completion.

Routes

66601/66602 Erode -Coimbatore--Erode.

66603/66604 Coimbatore-Shoranur- Coimbatore.

66605/66606 Coimbatore-Palakkad town -Coimbatore .

66607/66608 Erode-Palakkad town-Erode.

66609/66610 Palakkad -Ernamkulam-Palakkad

66611/12/13/14/15/16/17/18/19/66620 -Coimbatore-Mettupalayam-Podannur-Coimbatore.

== See also ==
- Palakkad
- Palakkad Junction railway station
- Palakkad Town railway station
- Palakkad district
- Jolarpettai–Shoranur line
- Shoranur–Mangalore line
