= Muthalamada railway station =

Railway station in Kerala, India

Muthalamada
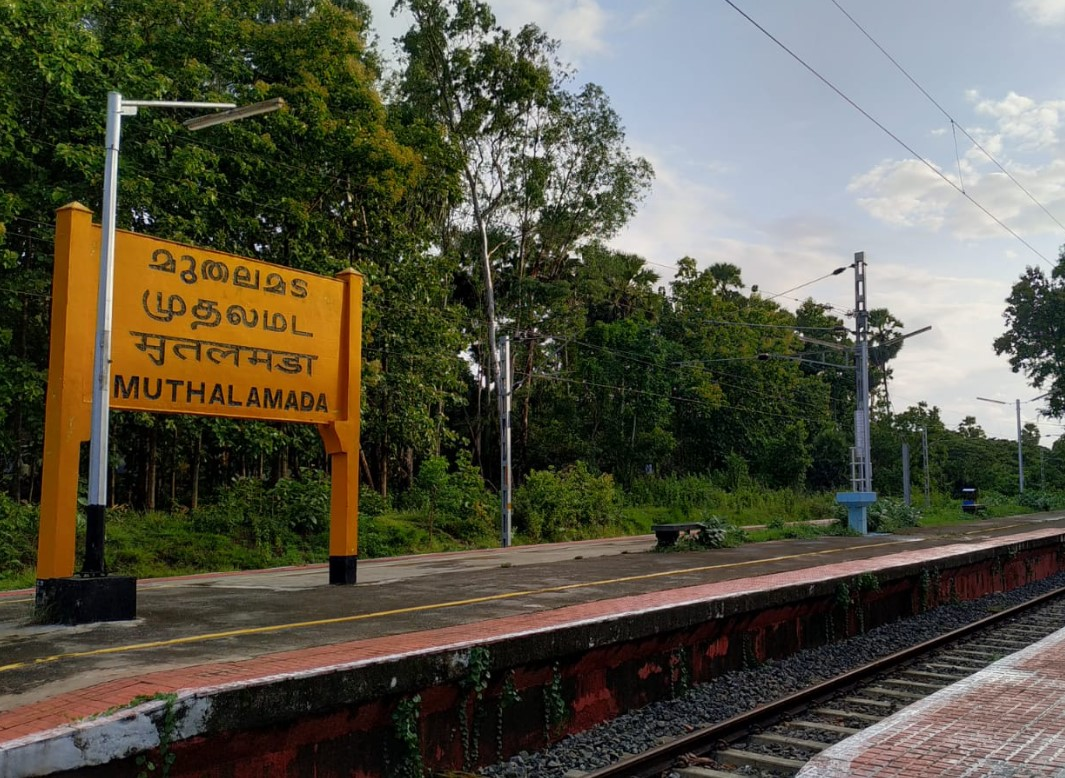
- Muthalamada railway station

General information
- Location: Muthalamada South, Kerala 678534; India
- Coordinates: 10.6281°N 76.7731°E
- Elevation: 150 metres (490 ft)
- System: Passenger train station
- Owner: Indian Railways
- Operator: Southern Railway zone
- Line: Palakkad-Pollachi line
- Platforms: 2
- Tracks: 2

Other information
- Status: Functioning
- Station code: MMDA
- Zone(s): Southern Railway zone
- Division(s): Palakkad

History
- Opened: 1898
- Electrified: Yes, Single-Line Electrification
Location
- Location within India

Muthalamada railway station (station code: MMDA) is an NSG–6 category Indian railway station in Palakkad railway division of Southern Railway zone. It is a major railway station serving the village of Muthalamada in the Palakkad District of Kerala, India. It is a railway station on the Palakkad–Pollachi line which is a branch line between Palakkad Jn and Pollachi Jn in the state of Kerala near to Tamil Nadu, India.

== History ==
The line was functioning completely between Palakkad Junction and Palakkad Town. The section of the line between Palakkad Town and Pollachi completed safety testing on 2 October 2015. The safety inspection that followed conversion of the track was completed on 7 October 2015. The line was approved for passenger train services by the Commissioner of Railway Safety on 8 October 2015.

== Trains ==
The train services running currently through Muthalamada Railway Station are as follows:-

=== Mail/Express Trains ===
- 16731 - Palakkad Junction (PGT) to Thiruchendur (TCN)
- 16732 - Thiruchendur (TCN) to Palakkad Junction (PGT)
- 66623 - PALAKKAD JUNCTION (PGT) to POLLACHI (POY) MEMU
- 66624 -POLLACHI(POY) to PALAKKAD JUNCTION (PGT)

== See also ==
- Vandithavalam
