= Melamuri =

- Suburb
- Location in Kerala, India Melamuri (India)
- Coordinates: 10°46′31″N 76°38′15″E
- Country: India
- State: Kerala
- District: Palakkad

Government
  - Body: Palakkad Municipality

Languages
  - Official: Malayalam, English
- Time zone: UTC+5:30 (IST)
- PIN: 678006,678014
- Vehicle registration: KL-09

Melamuri is a commercial centre in Palakkad city, Kerala, India. It is an important vegetable market and acts as a gateway to the Big Bazaar for traders and buyers from other areas of the district.

== History ==
Melamuri has been an important junction for a few centuries. It lies on an important location on the road leading from Ponnani to Coimbatore. This place's original name was Melemuri Amsom, as mentioned in old property documents.

== Important landmarks ==
Important landmarks in the area include the Shree Periya Maariamman temple, vegetable market, Karuna Hospital, Melamuri Telephone exchange and Mercy College. Melamuri is a major stop for buses plying on the Palakkad to Shornur road.

== Recent developments ==
The Ponnani State Highway has been widened. The opening of a by-pass road at Mepparamba to Mercy college, Palakkad a few years ago has eased traffic congestion. Minibus services have been established from Melamuri to Olavakkode. Palakkad Municipality has allocated Rs. 10 lakh for constructing a bus bay in Melamuri.
