= Thuravoor Pamba Road =

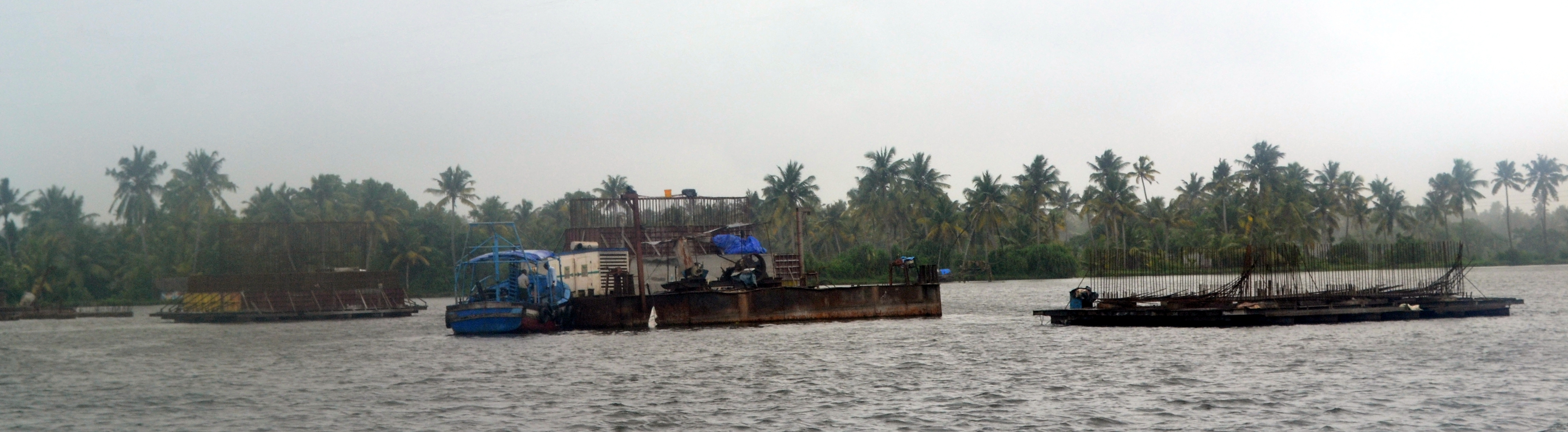
Thuravoor Thycattussery bridge under construction. This bridge is expected to open to public on 31 January 2014

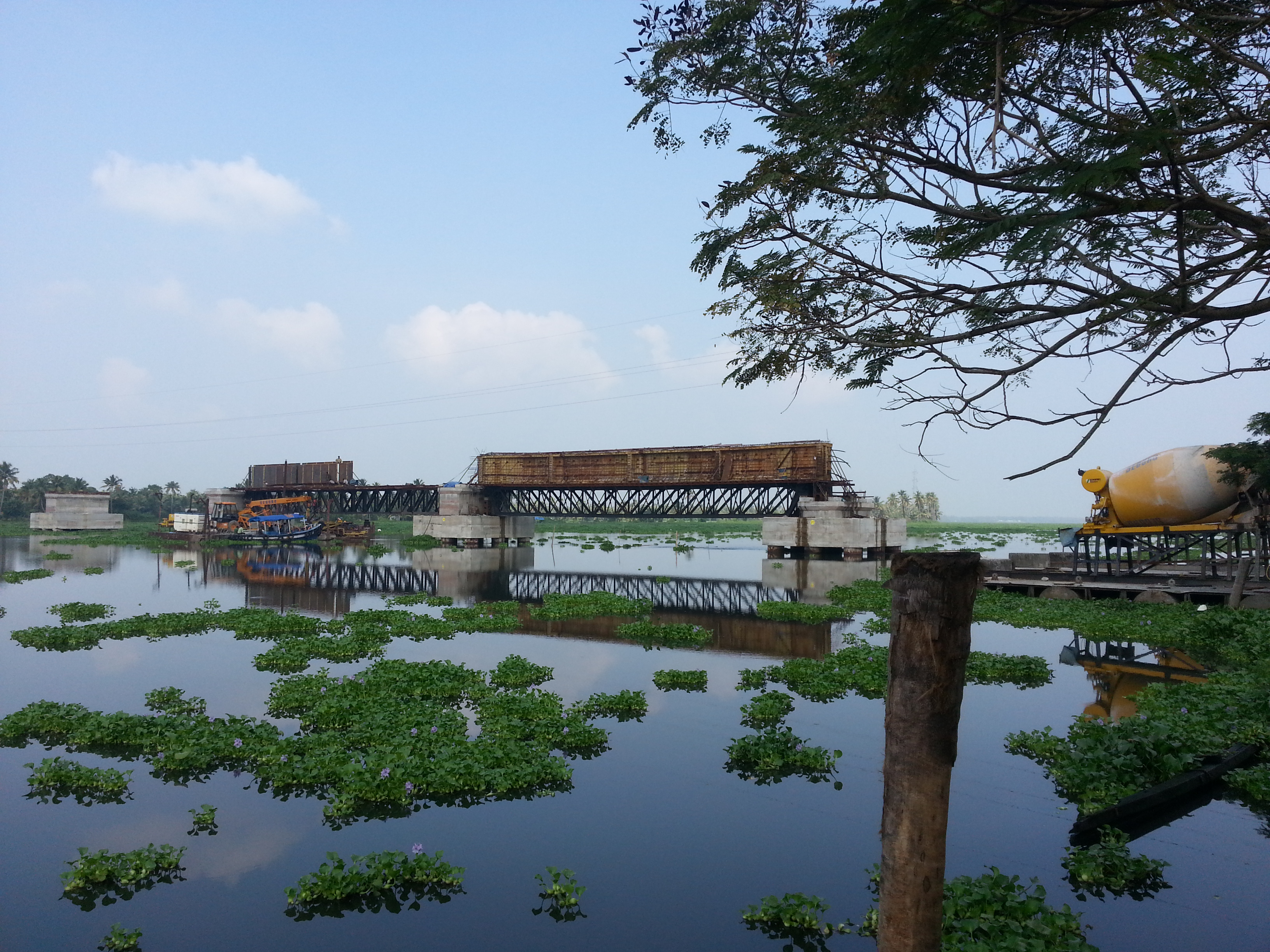
Thycattussery bridge under construction. Picture taken on 8 November 2013

Thuravoor Pamba road is a proposed road in Kerala, India connecting NH 47 to Sabarimala. This road is expected to reduce the travel time for Sabarimala pilgrims. This road which is connecting the northern part of Alappuzha and Kottayam Districts will increase the trade flow between these regions. Road is planned to be with a width of 12m. Road construction started in February 2013. Government is planning to complete the construction in 3 years.

Road starts from Thuravoor in NH 47 (between Cherthala and Ernakulam) and will pass through Thaicatussery, Udayanapuram, Vaikom, Kaduthuruthy, Kappumthala, Kuravilangad, Pala, Ponkunnam, Erumeli before reaching Pamba. Two bridges, one connecting Thuravoor and Thycattussery and another one connecting Makkekadavu and Nerekadavu will be constructed as part of this project. Thuravoor Thycattushery bridge will be of 330.50 metre length and will be having a double carriage way with 7.5 m width. There will be walkways on both sides with 1.5 m width. Bridge will be constructed with approach roads on both sides with a length of 750m.

In Kerala budget 2011, 151.89 crores was sanctioned for this project. 49.8 crore for Thuravoor Thycattussery bridge, 2.7 crore for approach road, 86 crore for Nerekadavu - Makekadavu bridge, 4.3 lakhs for approach road and 6.89 lakhs for Udayanapuram Road. Construction of Thuravoor Thycattussery bridge is in progress and is expected to be opened for public on 31 January 2014. Nerekadavu Makkekadavu bridge construction is in progress and is expected to be completed very soon.

There is an increased demand to declare this road as a pilgrimage path. K C Venugopal MP and Jose K Mani MP have raised this request in Parliament as well.

== Phases ==
Phase	Details	Amount allocated	Start date	End date	Status
Phase 1	Approach Road for Thuravoor - Thaikkattushery Bridge	2.7 crore			Completed and opened for public
Phase 2	Thuravoor - Thaikkattushery Bridge	49.5 crore	3 February 2013	31 May 2015	Completed and opened for public
Phase 3	Road from Pallithodu State Highway to Udayanapuram in Ernakulam- Ettumanoor State Highway	6.89 crore	TBD	TBD	Not Started
Phase 4	Makkekadavu - Nerekadavu Bridge	88.5 crore	27 January 2017	TBD	Started

== Phase 2: Approach Road for Thuravoor - Thaikkattushery Bridge ==
Approach road for the Thuravoor Thykkattussery bridge is currently under construction. Approach road with a length of 450m will have a width of 45 m with a median in the middle. There will also be drainage on both sides of the road.

== Phase 2: Thuravoor Thykkattussery Bridge ==
The Chief Minister of Kerala Mr. Oommen Chandy inaugurated the construction work of Thuravoor -Thaikkattussery Bridge on 3 February 2013. The Proposed bridge is expected to be open to public on 31 January 2014. In October 2013 the construction of the bridge hit a roadblock when the iron pillar used for construction was found to be bent. Officers from PWD claimed that they will start the constructions with in a week of delay.

22 December 2013: The deadline for the completion of this bridge is extended to May. It is also decided to have a monthly meeting under the leadership of district collected to evaluate the progress of the construction works.

The construction of the bridge was completed in May 2015 and opened to the public on 27 May 2015 by the Chief Minister of Kerala Mr. Oommen Chandy. The speedy completion of the project was unprecedented in the history of the public works of Kerala state.

== Phase 4 ==
Makkekadavu - Nerekadavu Bridge construction was to start on 1 November 2014. started on 27 January 2017. The work is in progress and the contractor for the project is Cherian Varkey Construction Company.
