= Vadakannikaapuram railway station =

Railway station in Kerala, India

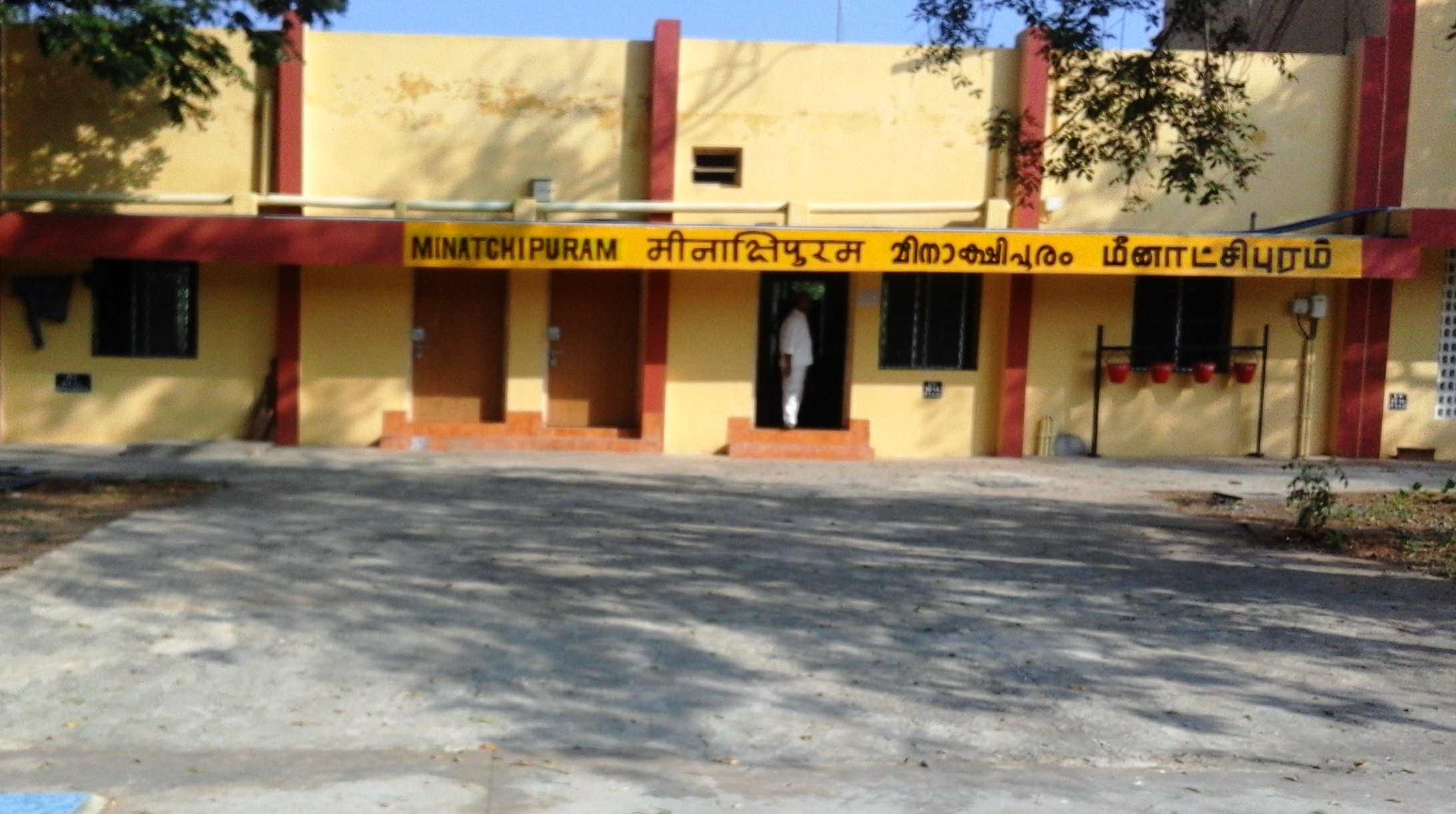
- Meenakshipuram near Pollachi

Overview
- Status: Not Operational
- Owner: Indian Railways
- Termini: Palakkad Junction; Pollachi Junction

Service
- Operator(s): PALAKKAD DIVISION, SOUTHERN RAILWAY
- Rolling stock: WAP4, WAP 7, WAP 1, WAG 5, WDG 4

History
- Opened: 1898
- Closed: 2009

Technical
- Number of tracks: 1
- Track gauge: 5 ft 6 in (1,676 mm) broad gauge
- Old gauge: 1,676 mm (5 ft 6 in) Broad gauge and 1,000 mm (3 ft 3 3/8 in) metre gauge dual gauge (between Palakkad Junction and Palakkad Town Railway Station); 1,000 mm (3 ft 3 3/8 in) (between Palakkad Town Railway Station and Pollachi Junction)
- Electrification: electrified
- Operating speed: 110
- Highest elevation: Yes

Vadakannikaapuram railway station is on the Palakkad–Pollachi line, which is a branch line between Palakkad and Pollachi in the state of Kerala, India.

== History ==
The line was functioning completely between Palakkad Junction and Palakkad Town. The section of the line between Palakkad Town and Pollachi completed safety testing on 2 October 2015. The safety inspection that followed conversion of the track was completed on 7 October 2015. The line was approved for passenger train services by the Commissioner of Railway Safety on 8 October 2015.
