= Pudunagaram railway station =

Railway station in Kerala, India

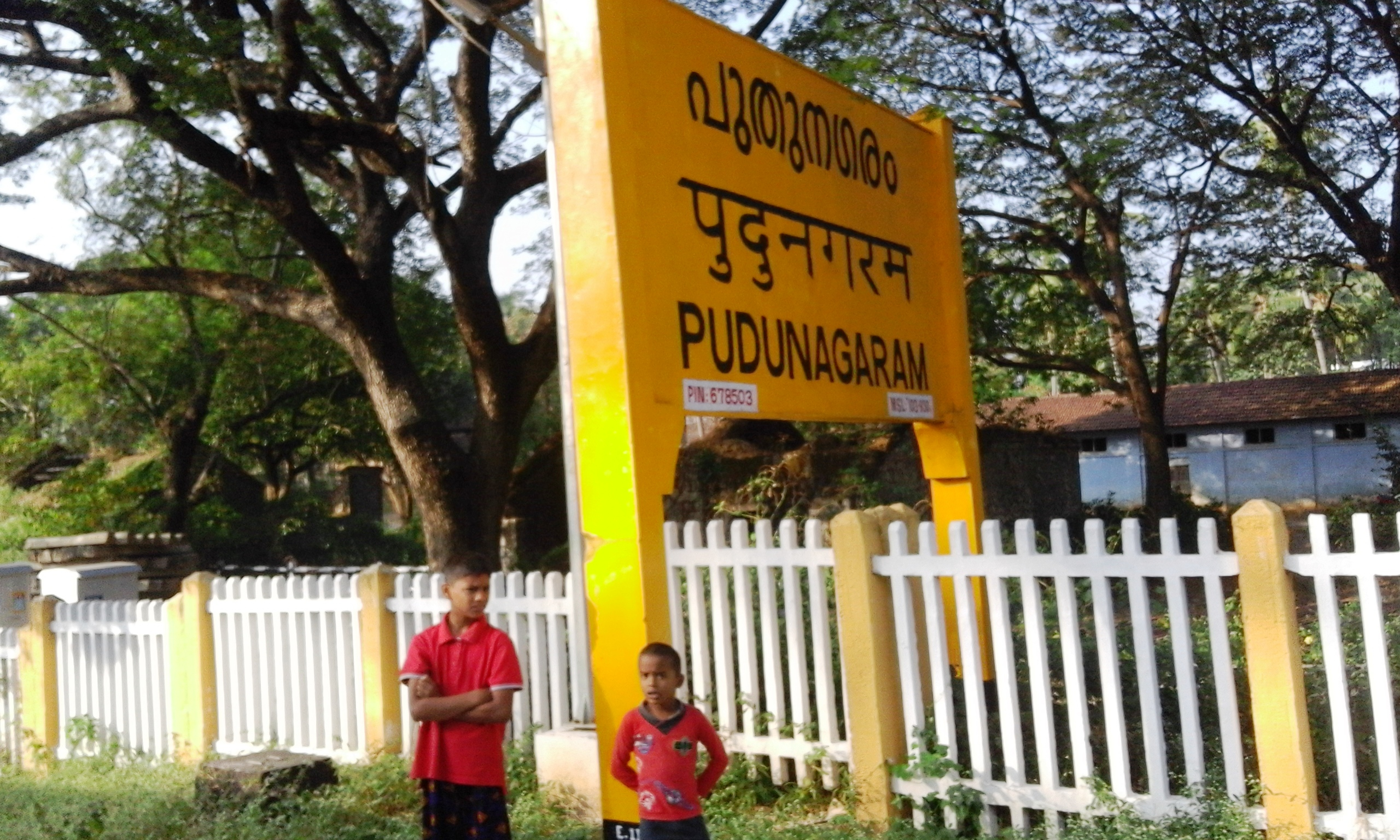
- Pudunagaram railway station

Overview
- Status: Operational
- Owner: Indian Railways
- Locale: Kerala
- Termini: Palakkad Junction; Pollachi Junction

Service
- Type: Halt Station
- Services: 2
- Operator: Southern railway Palakkad Division
- Rolling stock: WAP4, WDM2, WDG3, WDP3, WDM3, WAP 7

History
- Opened: 1898

Technical
- Line length: 58 Km
- Number of tracks: 3
- Character: Passenger Halt station
- Track gauge: 5 ft 6 in (1,676 mm) broad gauge
- Old gauge: 1,676 mm (5 ft 6 in) Broad gauge and 1,000 mm (3 ft 3 3/8 in) metre gauge dual gauge (between Palakkad Junction and Palakkad Town Railway Station); 1,000 mm (3 ft 3 3/8 in) (between Palakkad Town Railway Station and Pollachi Junction)
- Electrification: Fully electrified
- Operating speed: 115 Kmph
- Highest elevation: 250 Meter

Pudunagaram (station code: PDGM) is an NSG–6 category Indian railway station in Palakkad railway division of Southern Railway zone. It is a railway station on the Palakkad–Pollachi line which is a branch line between Palakkad and Pollachi in the state of Kerala, India.

== History ==
The line was functioning completely between Palakkad Junction and Palakkad Town. The section of the line between Palakkad Town and Pollachi completed safety testing on 2 October 2015. The safety inspection that followed conversion of the track was completed on 7 October 2015. The line was approved for passenger train services by the Commissioner of Railway Safety on 8 October 2015. Currently 3 trains have stoppage here.Thiruvananthapuram Central –Rameswaram Amrita Express Train & Thiruchendur –Palakkad Junction passenger, Palakkad Junction - Pollachi Junction Memu Passenger Have stop at Pudunagaram in up/down routes.
