= Puthur (Palakkad) =

- Suburb
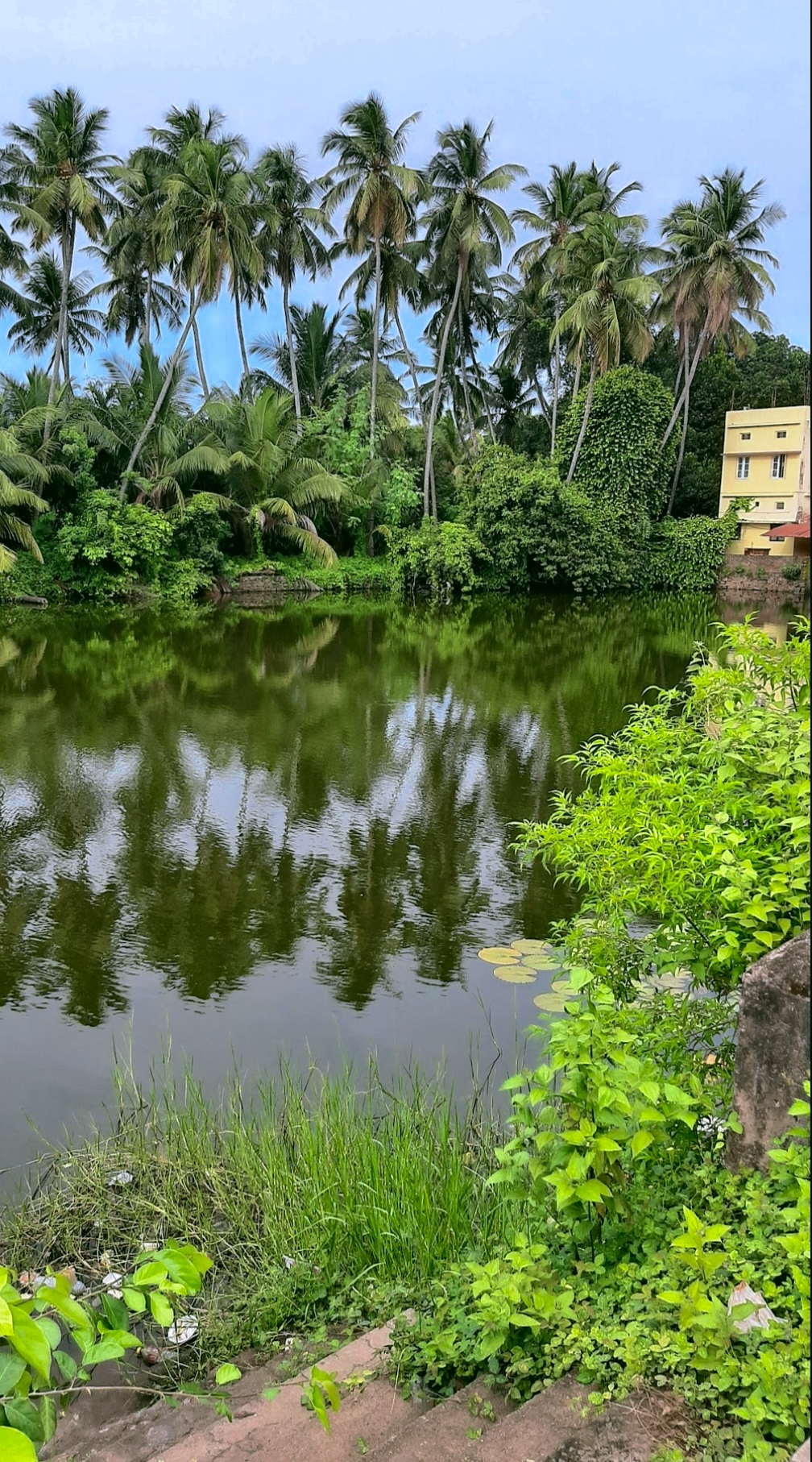
- Temple pond in Puthur, Palakkad

- Location in Kerala, India Puthur (India)
- Coordinates: 10.7862412°N 76.6637778°E
- Country: India
- State: Kerala
- District: Palakkad

Government
  - Type: Local
  - Body: Palakkad Municipality

Languages
  - Official: Malayalam, English
- Time zone: UTC+5:30 (IST)
- PIN: 678005
- Vehicle registration: KL 09

Puthur is a residential area in the Palakkad district, in the state of Kerala, India. Puthur comprises the wards 12 and 13 of Palakkad Municipality.

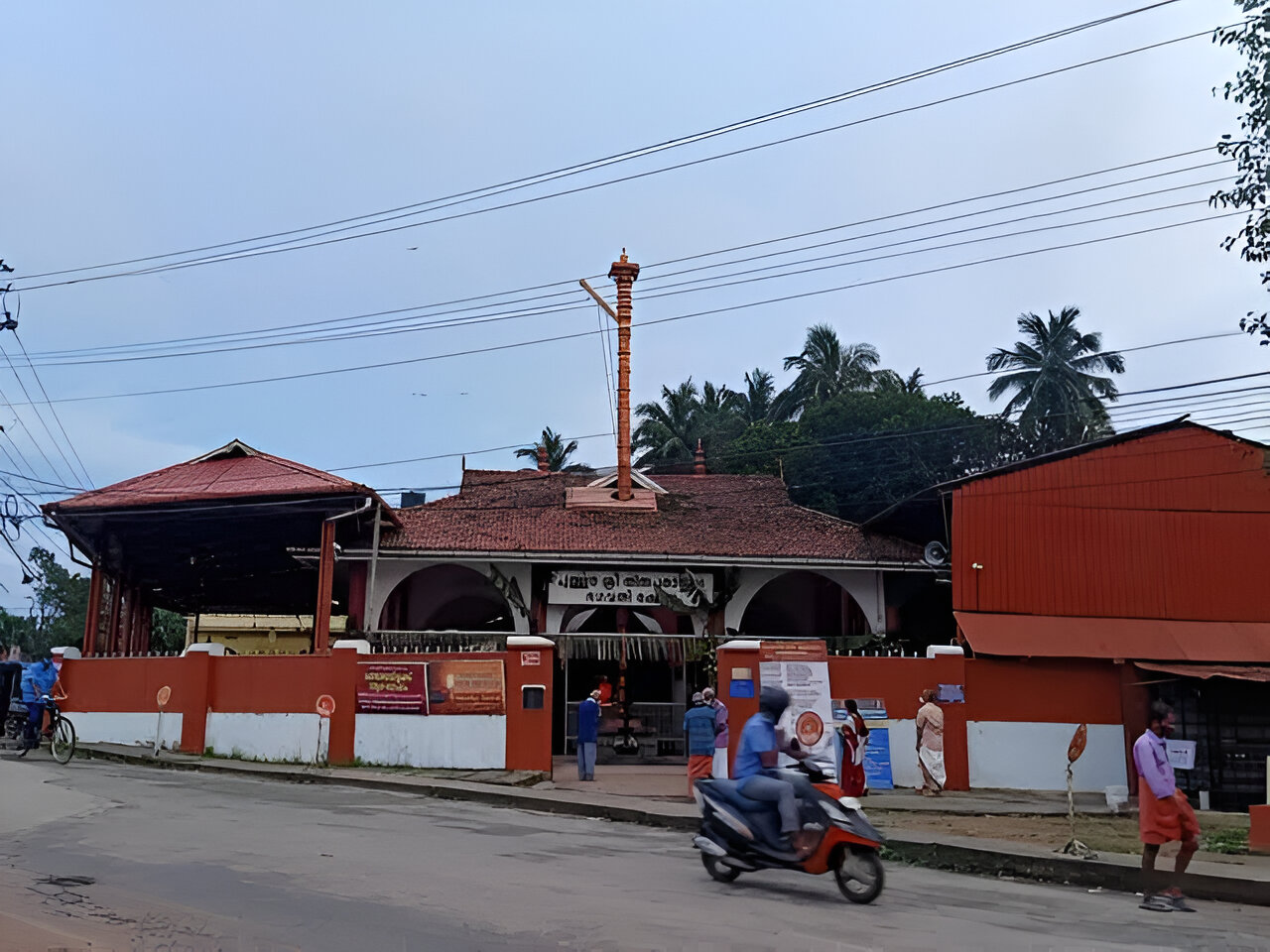
Puthur Sri Thirupuraaikal Bhagavathy Temple

The central attraction of Puthur is the Thirupuraikkal Bhagavathy temple. This temple houses the Goddess Karnaki, who is believed to be an incarnation of Goddess Parvathi. This temple is famous locally and attracts thousands of devotees every year to the Puthur-Vela festival.

The Palakkad-Ponnani Road and Malampuzha Road are some of the major roads that link the suburb to other cities for convenient and easy traveling. The places situated nearby to Puthur are Chittur-Thathamangalam, Palakkad, Ottappalam and Shoranur.

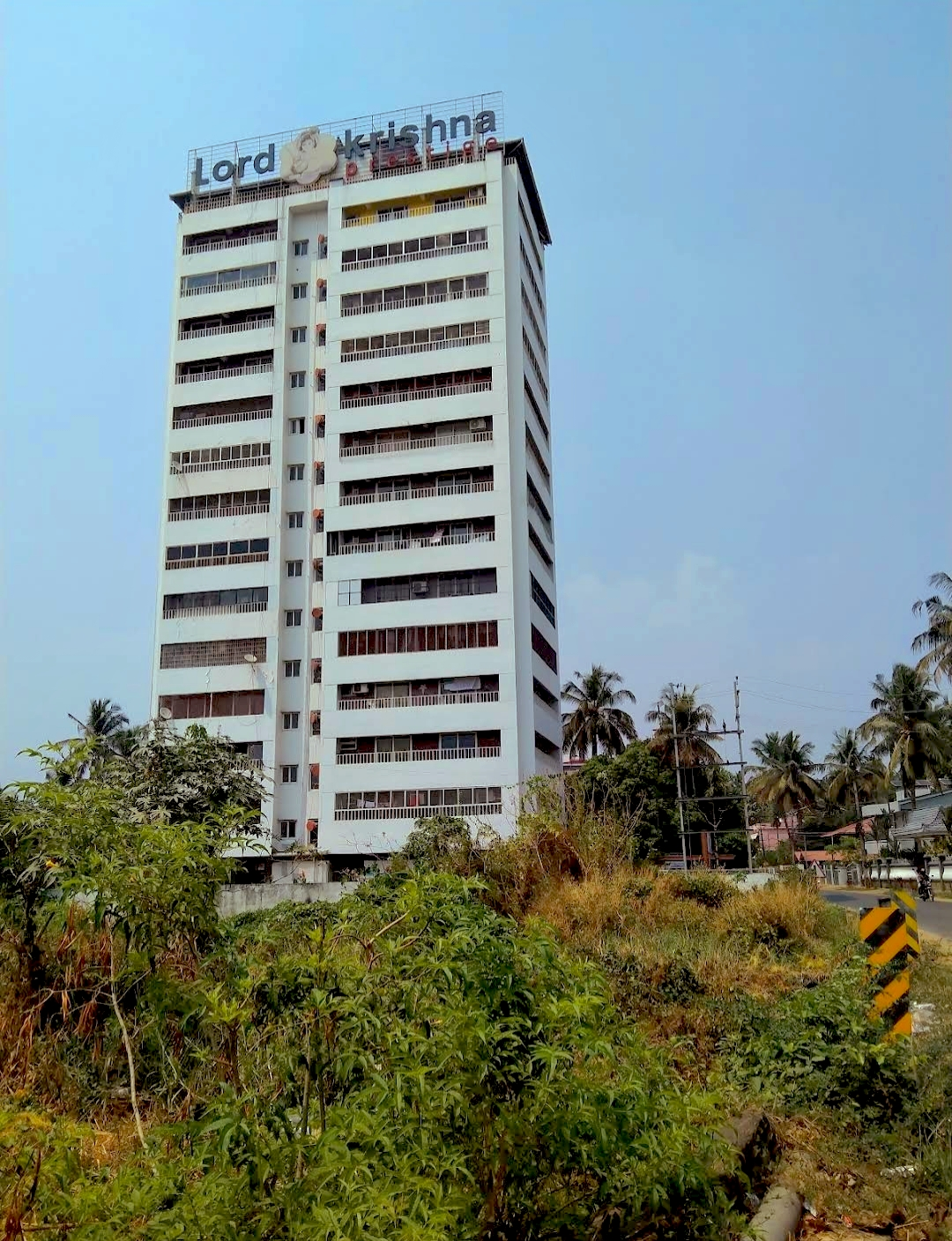
Residential apartment in Puthur, Palakkad

== Transportation ==
Puthur is connected to other cities through Palakkad by a bypass road probably known as Calicut bypass road, which was constructed to bypass Palakkad city for the passengers coming from parts of northern Kerala.Palakkad Junction railway station is the nearest major railway station. Coimbatore International Airport situated in Coimbatore, Tamil Nadu is the nearest airport.
