= Ulavaipu =

Village in Alappuzha District, Kerala, India

Ulavaipu is a small village situated on the northern side of Thaikattussery Panchayath in Cherthala Taluk. This village is also known as the Granary of Thaikattussery Panchayath.

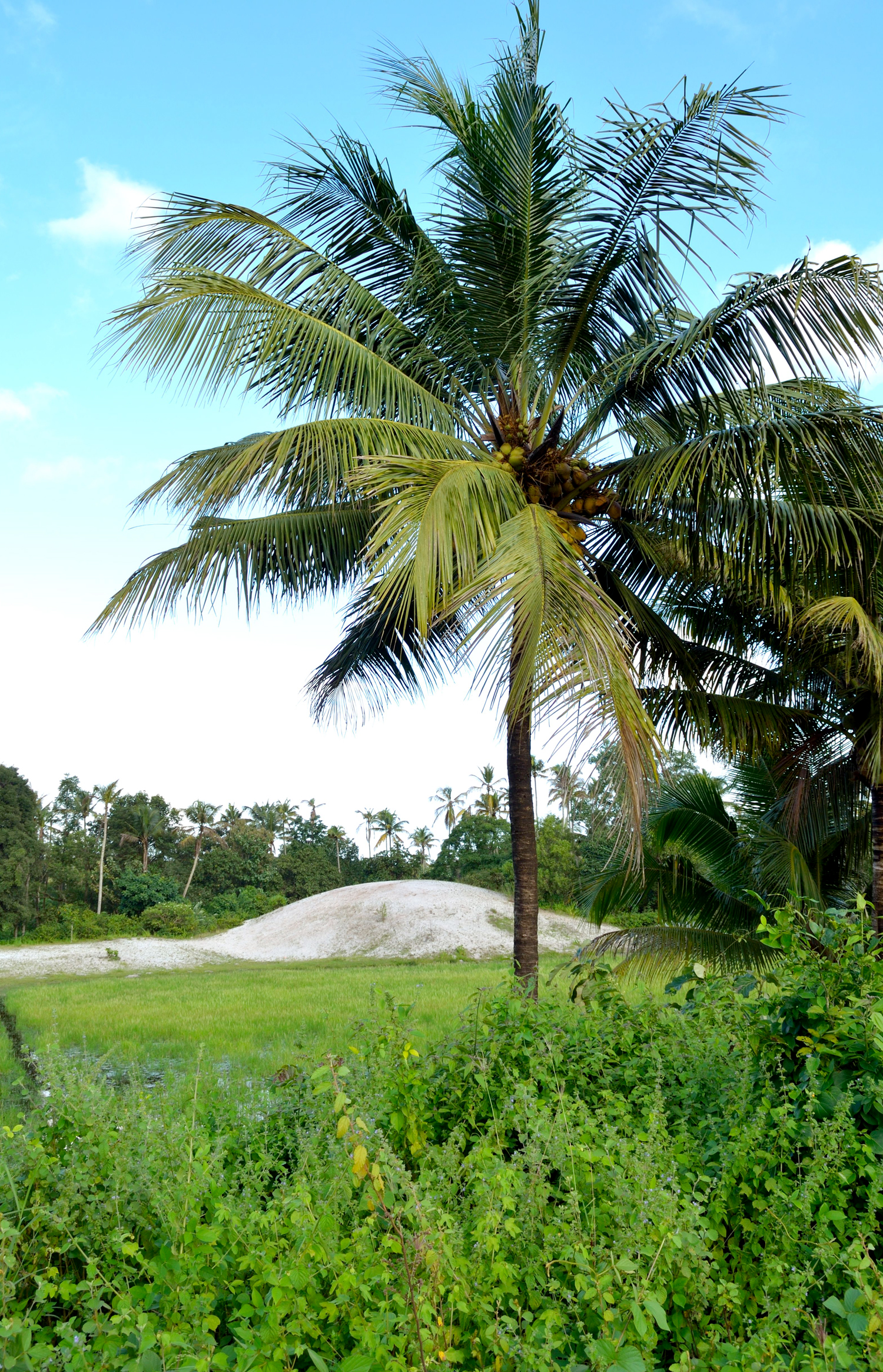
Ulavaipu village
