= Pudur =

Pudur ("new village" in Tamil and Malayalam) may refer to several places in India:

== Kerala ==
- Pudur, Palakkad

== Tamil Nadu ==
- Pudur, Erode
- Pudur, Ambattur, or Pudhur, Chennai
- Pudur, Pudukkottai
- Pudur, Thanjavur district
- Pudur (Orathanadu), Thanjavur district
- Pudur, Tirunelveli, Tenkasi district
- Pudur block, Thoothukudi district
- V. Pudur, Thoothukudi district

== Telangana ==
- Pudur, Jagtial district, or Poodur
- Pudur, Vikarabad district

== See also ==
- Puthur (disambiguation)
- Puttur (disambiguation)
