= Palakkad Town railway station =

Railway station in Kerala, India

Palakkad Town
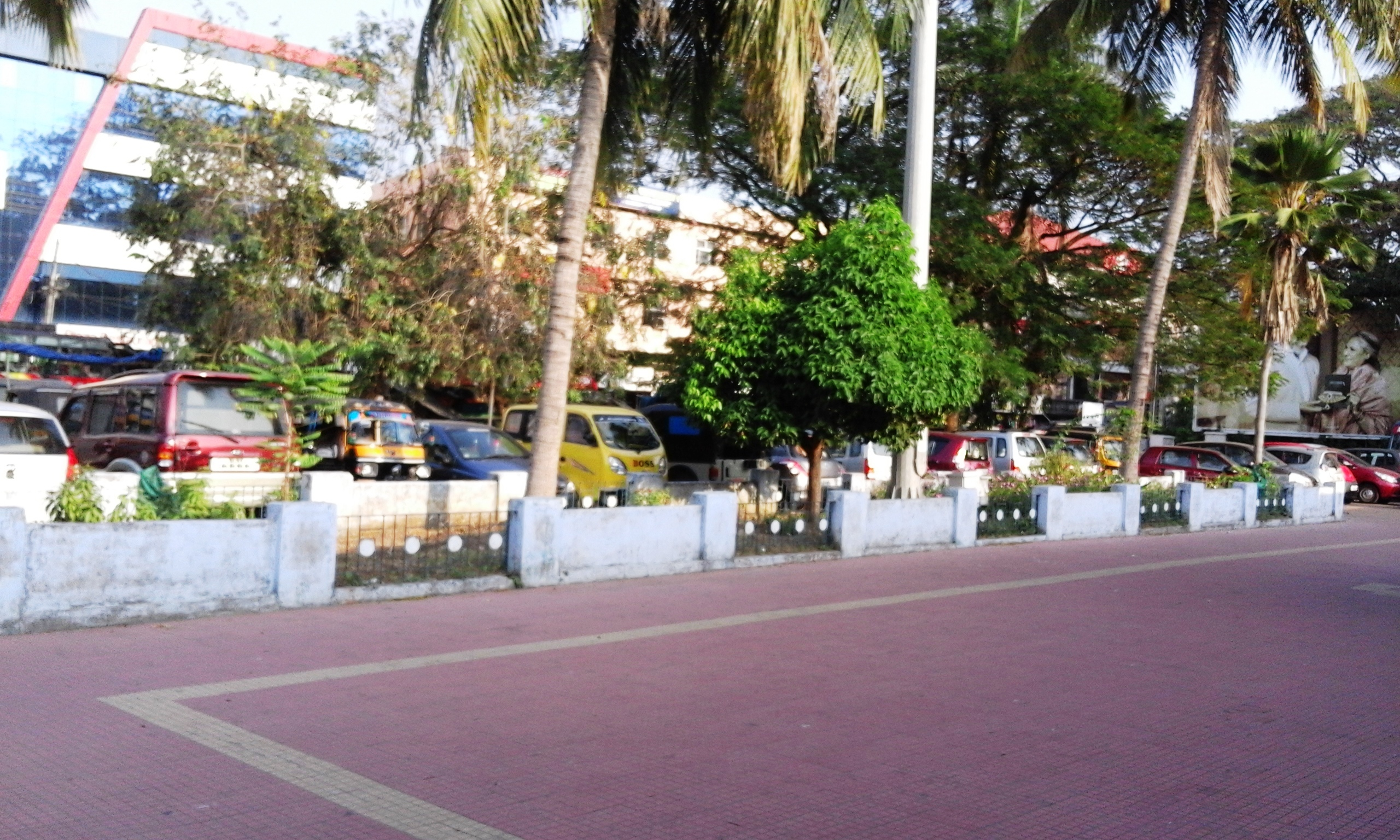
- Palakkad Town railway station

General information
- Location: Palakkad, Palakkad, Kerala; India
- Coordinates: 10.7760°N 76.6524°E
- System: Regional rail, Light rail & Commuter rail station
- Owner: Indian Railways
- Operator: Southern Railway zone
- Line: Palakkad-Pollachi line
- Platforms: 4(1A, 1, 2 & 3)
- Tracks: 5

Construction
- Structure type: At–grade
- Parking: Available

Other information
- Status: Functioning
- Station code: PGTN
- Zone(s): Southern Railway zone
- Division(s): Palakkad
- Fare zone: Indian Railways

History
- Opened: 1904; 122 years ago
- Closed: -
- Rebuilt: 2025

Passengers
- 1000: 5000 ▲25%
Location
- Location within India Location within Kerala

Palakkad Town railway station (station code: PGTN) is an NSG–5 category Indian railway station in Palakkad railway division of Southern Railway zone. It is a railway station that serves city of Palakkad, Kerala and falls under the Palakkad railway division of the Southern Railway zone, Indian Railways. City is served by two railway stations, Palakkad Junction railway station and Palakkad Town railway station.

== Routes ==
(Single electrified BG) Palakkad Junction–Palakkad Town

(Single Electric Line BG) Palakkad Town–Pollachi Jn

== Railway hub development ==
Pitline work to service Vande Bharat and Amrit Bharat trainsets started in early 2024 and the pit line is expected to start functioning by August 2026. This could make it not only a major railway hub in the city but also in the state. A 1.8 km line extension has also been approved, directly connecting the station to Parli and bypassing Palakkad Junction station.
