= Puthur-Vela =

Annual festival in Kerala, India

Puthur Vela is an annual festival at the Puthur Thirupuraikkal Bhagavathy temple (10.7877378°N 76.661675°E), located in Puthur, Kerala, India. The temple houses the Goddess Karnaki, who is believed to be an incarnation of Goddess Parvathi. This temple is famous locally and attracts several hundred devotees every year. The Kadhana vedi (firecrackers) are set off at 6 pm every day after the evening pooja.

The festival is conducted during the month of April. The festivities last for 3 to 4 weeks in the Malayalam month of Meenam, which corresponds to March–April of the Western calendar. The flag symbolizing the beginning of the festivities is hoisted on the first Friday of Meenam. Subsequent evenings are filled with devotional programmes such as Bhajans and carnatic music concerts. The highlights of the festival include Kathakali performances by artists, and traditional temple arts like Ottam Thullal and Chakyar Koothu.

A recent addition, and now a crowd draw, is the Puthur Sree Thirupuraikkal Music and Dance Festival, a festival of Indian classical music and dance which lasts for over a week, depending on the number of artists engaged for performances. Singers like K J Yesudas, Omanakutty, Hariprasad Chaurasya, Hariharan, Ustad Amjad Ali Khan, Aman and Ayan Ali Khan, Jayachandran, Mano, K S Chitra, L. Subramaniam, Kavitha Krishnamoorty, M.G. Sreekumar, Vijay Yesudas, Jayachandran, Pandit Jasraj, Shankar Mahadevan, Balamuraleekrishna, Udith Narayanan, Sadhana Sargam, Vijay Prakash, Karthik, Naresh Iyer, Unni Menon, Anuradha Sriram, Venugopal, Unnikrishnan, Pankaj Udhas, Sithara, Manjari, Gayathri, and dancers like Lakshmi Gopalaswami, Mallika Sarabhai, Padma Subramaniam, Shobhana, and Manju Warrier have performed here in previous years. In 2007, an award-winning blind artist named Vijayalakshmi performed on the rudra veena (a one-stringed instrument played by pressing a piece of wood at strategic locations on the string). The audience was moved to tears on seeing her grit and talent.

The festivities end on the final 'Vela' day with a grand procession of the deity on a decorated elephant. The Goddess is accompanied by ten or eleven other decorated elephants. The procession is accompanied by Kerala's traditional orchestra - the Panchavadyam and the Pandimelam.

The temple flag is brought down on the day after the Vela to signify the end of festivities.

On the way from Sultanpet to Puthur (just 1 kilometer (0.62 mi)), is the Ramanathapuram Graamam which has the Ganapathi Temple, the Sri Krishna Temple, and the Shivan Temple.
