= Puttur =

Puttur may refer to:

- Puttur, Karnataka, a city in South Kannada district, Karnataka, India
  - Puttur (Vidhana Sabha constituency), Assembly constituency of Puttur, Karnataka
  - Puttur taluk
- Puttur, Tirupati district, a town in Andhra Pradesh state in India
  - Puttur (Andhra Pradesh Assembly constituency), a defunct Assembly constituency of Puttur, Andhra Pradesh
  - Puttur mandal, a mandal in Andhra Pradesh
- Puttur, Sri Lanka, a town in Sri Lanka
- Puttur Narasimha Nayak, Kannada and Konkani singer

== See also ==
- Puthur (disambiguation)
- Pudur (disambiguation)
