= Olavakkode =

Olavakkode Olavakkot
- Suburb
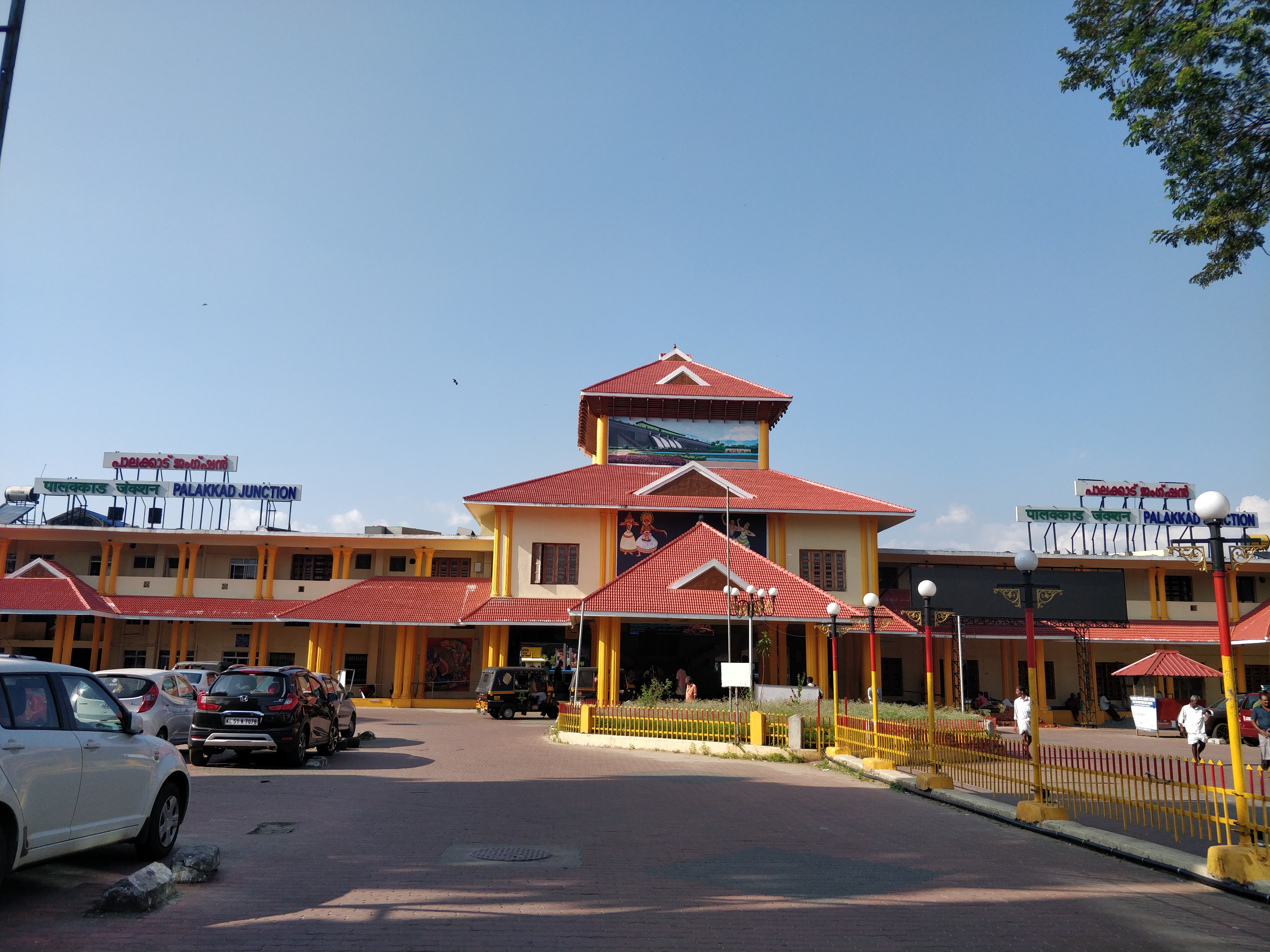
- Palakkad Junction Railway Station
- Interactive map of Olavakkode
- Coordinates: 10°47′0″N 76°38′0″E
- Country: India
- State: Kerala
- District: Palakkad
- Founder: Pazhashi Raja

Government
  - Body: Palakkad Municipality

Languages
  - Official: Malayalam, English
- Time zone: UTC+5:30 (IST)
- PIN: 678002
- Telephone code: 0491
- Vehicle registration: KL- 9
- Nearest city: Palakkad
- Lok Sabha constituency: Palakkad

Olavakkode is a region in Palakkad city, Kerala, India. It is composed of two main areas: the Kavilpad and the Railway Colony. Olavakkode is located 4 km from Palakkad city and lies on National Highway 966. It is one of the major suburbs of Palakkad city as Palakkad Junction railway station one of the major stations of the city is located there.

== Transport ==
The main railway station in the city, Palakkad Junction railway station is situated there. It is also the entry point by road from the North Malabar. Olavakkode lies on National Highway 966, which connects Palakkad with Kozhikode via Malappuram. The nearest airport is Coimbatore International Airport.

== Economy ==
During the 2010s many residential developments were built in this area. National Highway 966 connects Palakkad with Kozhikode. Facilities like banks (including Sunday banking by one of the premier banks), ATMs, shopping places, lodges, hotels, hospitals, dental outlets, and marriage halls are available.

== Education ==
- Co-Operative Arts & Science College

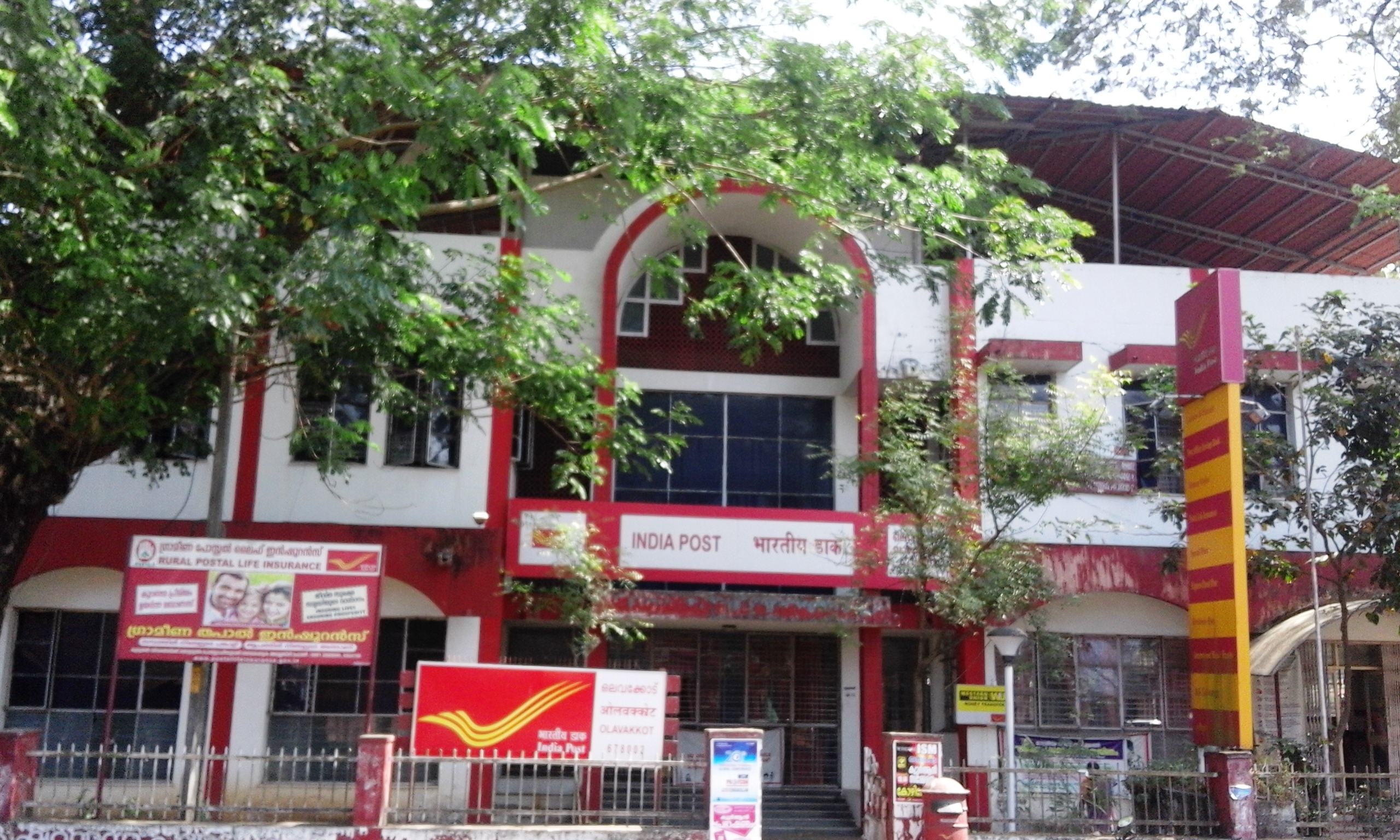
Olavakkod Head Post Office

== Points of interest ==
- Palakkad Junction (formerly called Olavakkode Junction)
- Palakkad railway division office
- Divisional Railway Hospital
- Malampuzha Dam and Garden
- Shri Thirupuraikkal Bhagavathy temple
- Thirumananghat Shiva Temple
- Jain Temple
- Previous location of the Broad Gauge Railway junction
- St.Joseph's Forane Church

== Image Gallery ==
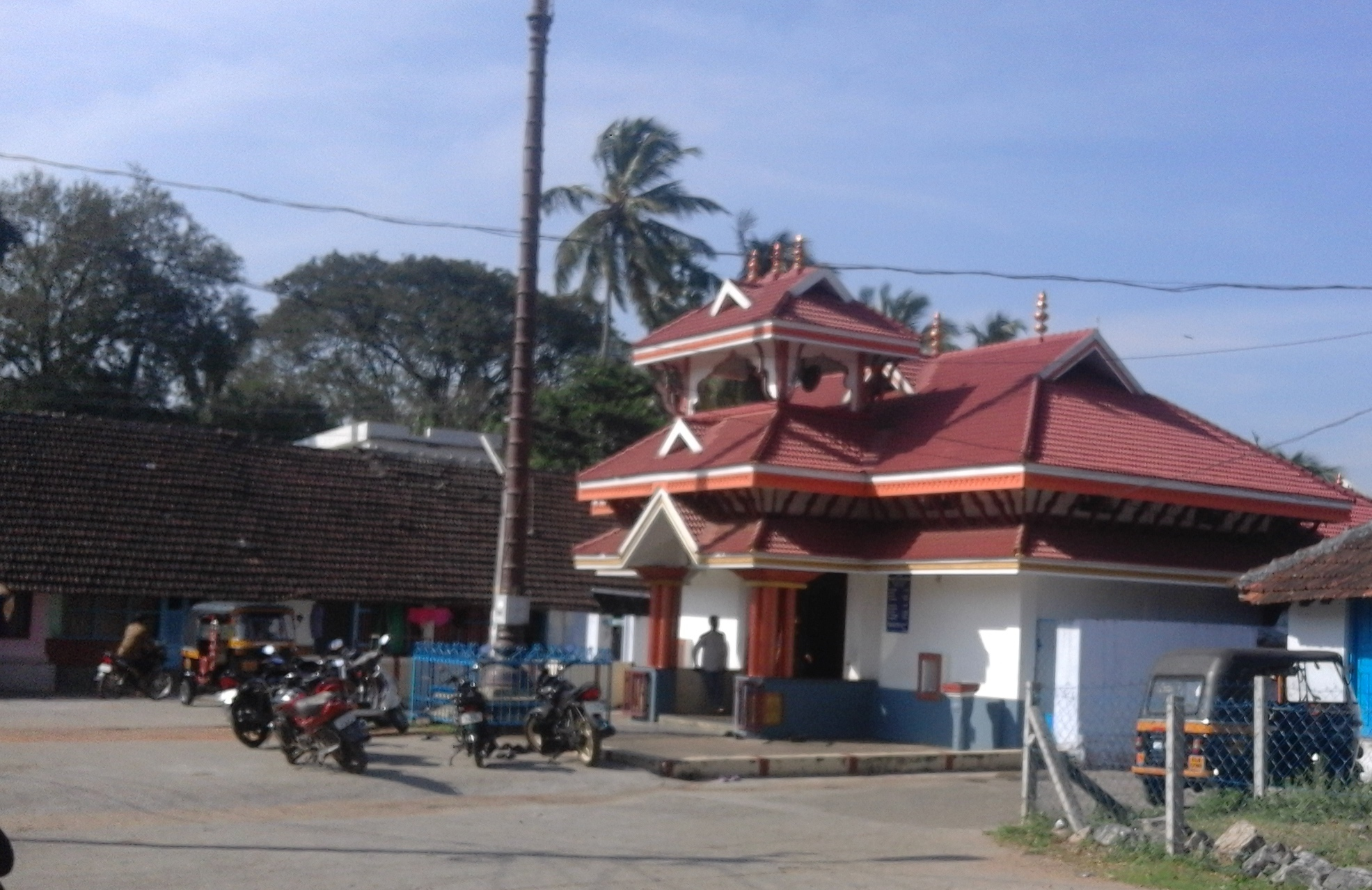
Temple in Olavakkod

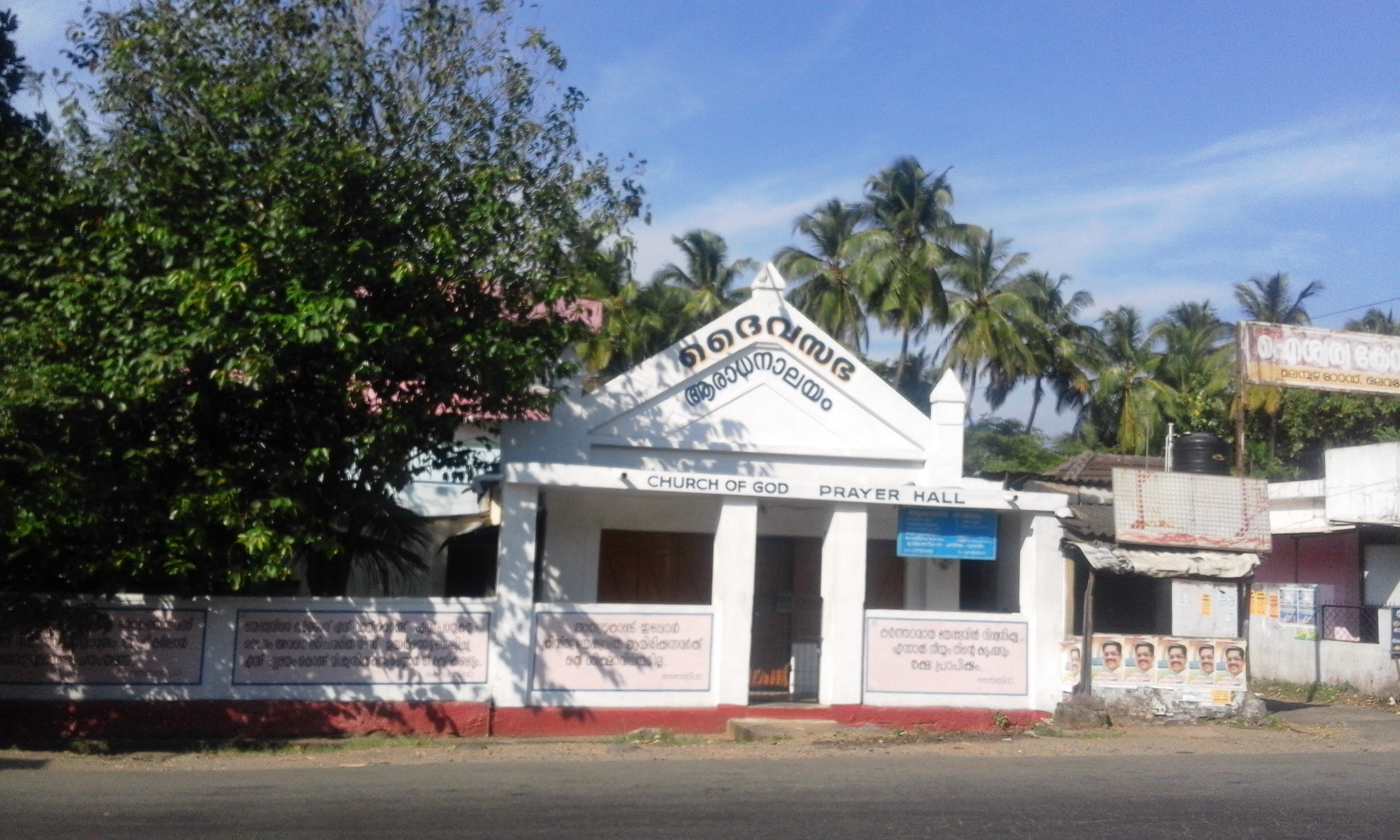
Daiva Sabha Church

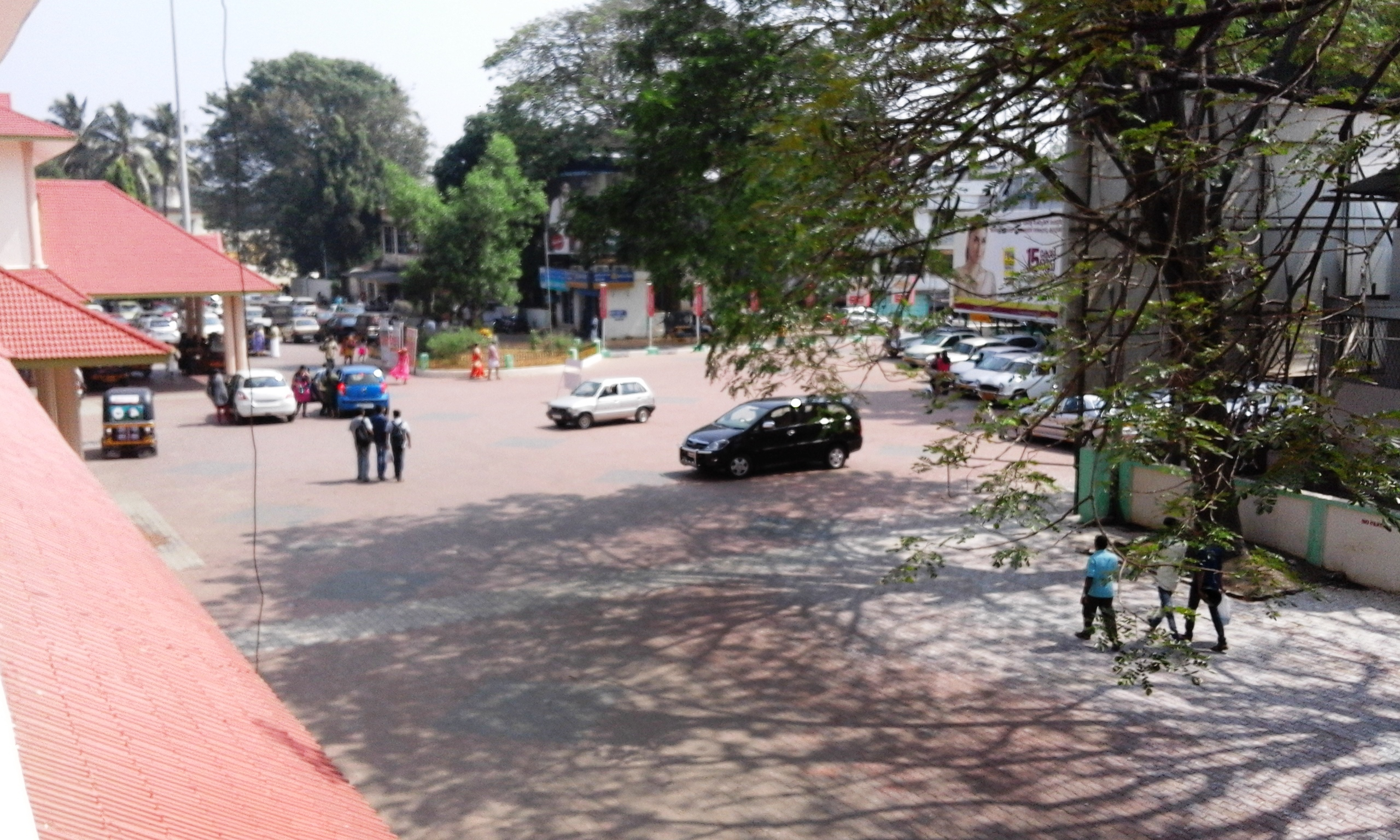
Railway Compound

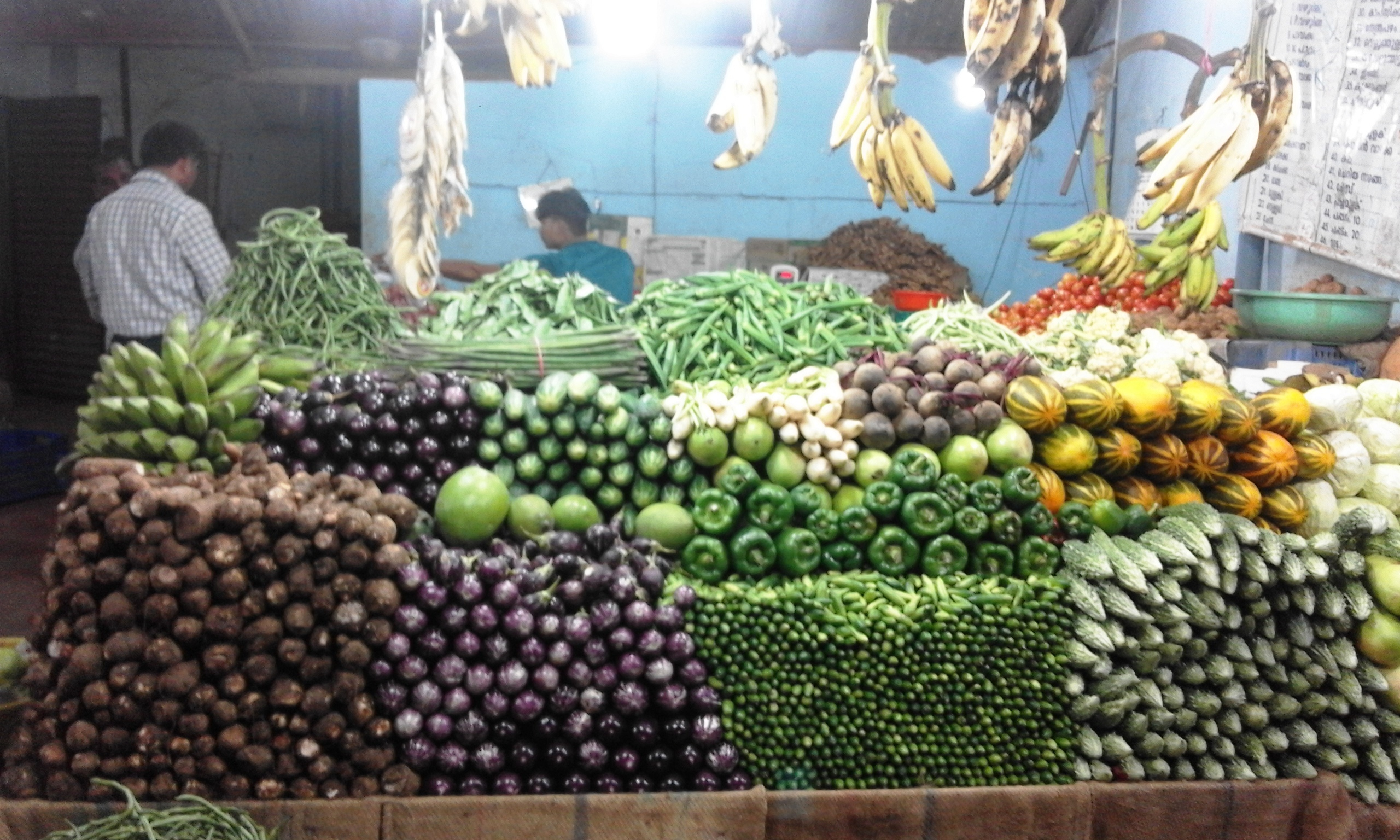
Vegetable shop near Catholic Bank
