= Ganesh Puthur =

Indian poet born (1995)

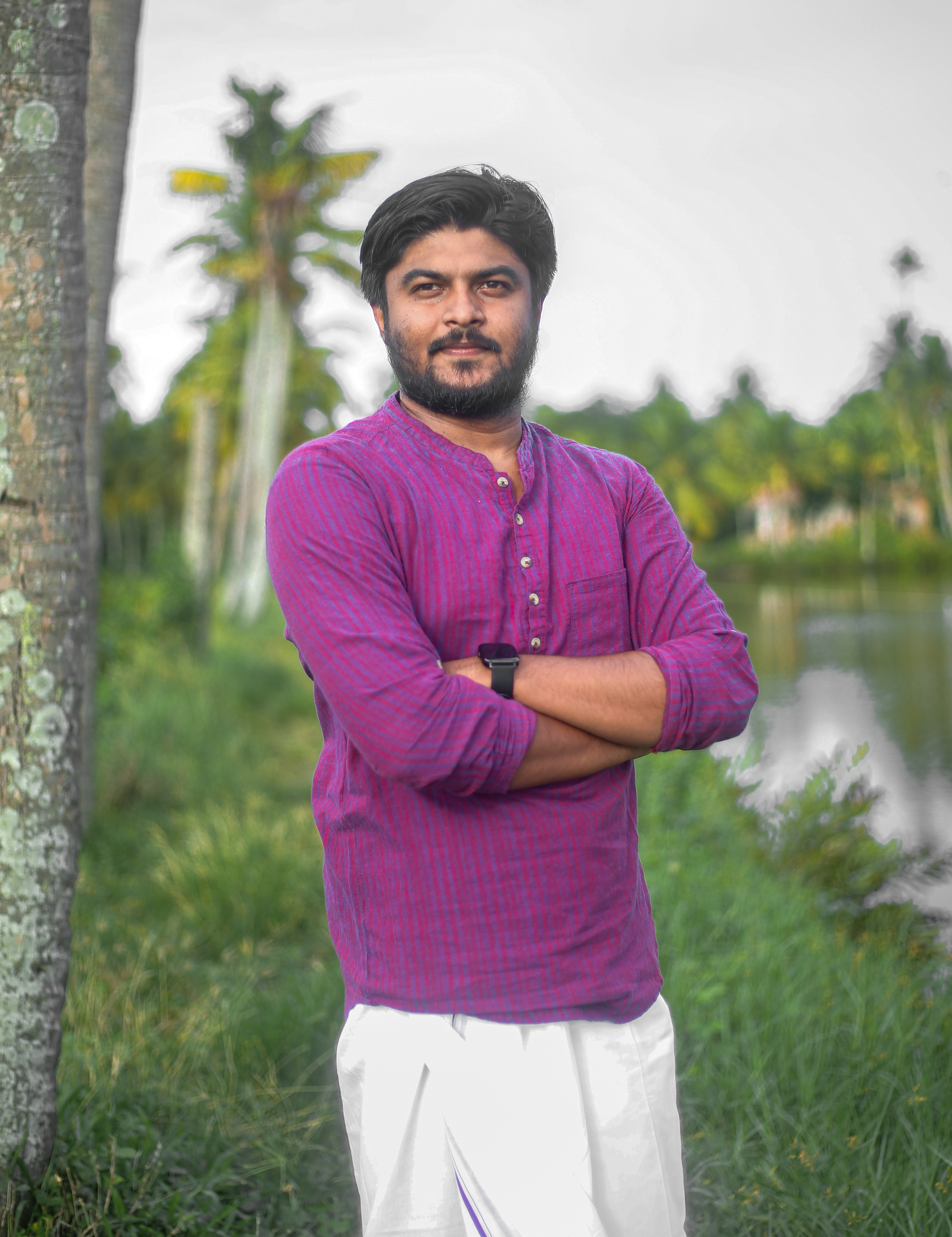
- Born: Ganesh P. R. 1995 (age 30–31); Thaikattussery, Alappuzha district, Kerala
- Education: Master's Degree in History
- Alma mater: Central University of Hyderabad; NSS Hindu College, Changanassery
- Occupations: Poet, Historian, Political analyst
- Writing career
- Notable work: Achante Alamara
- Notable awards: Yuva Puraskar

Ganesh Puthur is a writer, historian and poet from Kerala, India, who writes in Malayalam and English languages. His first anthology of poems named Achante Alamara won many awards including the Yuva Puraskar (2023) by Sahitya Akademi. He was also awarded Junior Fellowship by the Ministry of Culture (India) Government of India, an honour bestowed upon outstanding individuals in the field of culture.

== Biography ==
Ganesh P. R. popularly known as Ganesh Puthur was born in a small village named Ulaveyp in Thaikattussery panchayat in Alappuzha district of Kerala, to Ramesan Puthur and Gangadevi. He graduated from NSS Hindu College, Changanassery and received his Master's in History from the Department of History, University of Hyderabad. Also a political analyst, Ganesh writes articles on international affairs, history and Indian politics.

== Literary career ==
Ganesh Puthur is a writer who writes in Malayalam and English languages. Apart from major periodicals in Malayalam, his poems have also appeared in popular publications such as The Muse India, Poems India and Borderless Journal. He used to write poems in the Mathrubhumi weekly children's literature column during his school days, and his first published poem, Nalathe Prabhatham, was published in the Mathrubhumi weekly when he was in the 8th standard. He was also awarded Sir Jadunath Sarkar Fellowship by Foundation for Indian Historical and Cultural Research (FIHCR) for promoting original research and writing in Indian history. Ganesh Puthur is also a member of the Samastha Kerala Sahithya Parishath, making him one of the youngest writers to receive membership in the organisation. He writes a column for Children’s World Magazine titled Nature Traditions, published by Children's Book Trust (New Delhi). His column explores how legends, mythology, ancient traditions, and cultural practices from around the world reflect our relationship with the environment.

== Works ==
- Achante Alamaara (in Malayalam). Palakkad: Logos books. 2020. ISBN 9789390118526.
- Amma Varakkunna Veedu (in Malayalam) (1st ed.). Kottayam: DC Books. 2023. ISBN 9789357322836.

== Awards ==
In 2023, Ganesh received the Yuva Puraskar by Sahitya Akademi for his poetry collection Achchante Alamara. In 2021, he was awarded the Mangalam Swaminathan National Award by the Mangalam Swaminathan Foundation, for excellence in arts and culture. He has also won various literary awards such as Mamboo Literary Award, Rama Varma Raja Literary Award, Kavi Muttat Sudha Literary Award, Sanghasabdam Poetry Award and Mathrubhumi Vishupathip Poetry Award.
