= Mepparamba =

- Suburb
- Location in Kerala, India Mepparamba (India)
- Coordinates: 10.7761339°N 76.6322029°E
- Country: India
- State: Kerala
- District: Palakkad

Government
  - Body: Palakkad Municipality, Pirayiri Panchayat

Languages
  - Official: Malayalam, English
- Time zone: UTC+5:30 (IST)
- PIN: 678006
- Telephone code: 0491
- Vehicle registration: KL 09
- Climate: MIXED (Köppen)

Mepparamba is a commercial and residential area in Palakkad city of Kerala.
