= Pudur, Thanjavur district =

Pudur
- village
- Country: India
- State: Tamil Nadu
- District: Thanjavur
- Taluk: Thanjavur

Population (2001)
  - Total: 3,485

Languages
  - Official: Tamil
- Time zone: UTC+5:30 (IST)

Pudur is a village in the Thanjavur taluk of Thanjavur district, Tamil Nadu, India.

Tilting towards modern higher education. Many from this village had moved in to cities across the Globe and adding value to local community out there and also value back home in pudur.

== Demographics ==
As per the 2001 census, Pudur had a total population of 3485 with 1672 males and 1813 females. The sex ratio was 1084. The literacy rate was 69.4.
