= Thirupuraikkal Temple =

Hindu temple in Kerala, India

- Thirupuraikkal Temple, Moothanthara, Palakkad, Kerala

Religion
- Affiliation: Hinduism
- District: Palakkad
- Deity: Kannagi

Location
- Location: Moothanthara
- State: Kerala
- Country: India
- Interactive map of Thirupuraikkal Temple
- Coordinates: 10.7767°N 76.6386°E

Architecture
- Type: Architecture of Kerala

Specifications
- Temple: One
- Elevation: 111.54 m (366 ft)

Thirupuraikkal Temple (full name: Sri Kachanam Kulam Thirupuraikkal Bhagawathy Temple) is a Hindu temple at Moothanthara in Palakkad town, in the Indian state of Kerala. It is also known as the Karnaki Amman Temple.

Also there is another karnaki temple in koduvayur where is the moolasthanam of all karnaki temples around palakkad

== Worship ==
It is Kerala’s one and only Karnaki Temple where the goddess Karnaki is worshipped in her full idolic form. This temple is situated at the Palakkad Town circle in Moothanthara (new name - Karnaki Nagar), a dwelling place of Karnaki’s own people descended from the neighbouring state of Tamil Nadu within historic times.

One of the main attractions of this temple is the way the traditional pooja rituals are performed in Karnaki’s temple and in the Visalakshi Sametha Shiva Temple (Siva-Parvathy Temple) in the same compound. For Karnaki, the Kerala form of pooja practices are performed by the Nambudiri; while in the Shiva Temple, Tamil Shaiva form of Pooja practices are performed by Tamil Brahmin priests.

Unlike other Tamil speaking caste groups already present or having descended from neighbouring states, Moothan people have accepted both cultures alike. Even though there are having lineages from Tamil Nadu, They mainly speak Malayalam. The temple has emerged as one of the spacious and beautiful temples of Palakkad, displaying a mix of Tamil and Malayalam architecture.

The temple's main festival is Valiya Aarattu, celebrated by the community for three days in the month of Malayalam calendar. On the day of Valiya Aarattu, prasad is given to the devotees and it is the biggest event organized in Palakkad every year. The cost of organising this function is fully sponsored by the devotees of Karnaki, who are merchants in all categories of business in Palakkad.

== History ==
The moolasthanam (the root place) where Goddess Karnaki is worshipped, is at Nadu–pathi at Moothanthara (Melamuri). Once this temple was well maintained and people from other neighbouring deshams (places) came to worship Karnaki (being the only idol around in that given period). It is observed from history that the Muslim ruler Tippu Sultan, son of Hyder Ali, ransacked and destroyed this temple during his reign at Palakkad. Devotees gathered to save the possessions of the temple and to avoid destruction of the idol. This idol was retained by her own sect of Moothans and is worshipped at Karnaki Amman temple, Moothanthara. Others of her divine possessions such as a peedom (sitting chair) are worshipped at Vadakkanthara Bhagwathy temple, while her umbrella is worshipped at another Karnaki temple in the town circle and the Kindi is worshipped at Pirayiri Kannukottu Bhagawathy temple.

== See also ==
- Temples of Kerala
