= Thaikattussery =

Thycattusserry Thycattusserry
- village
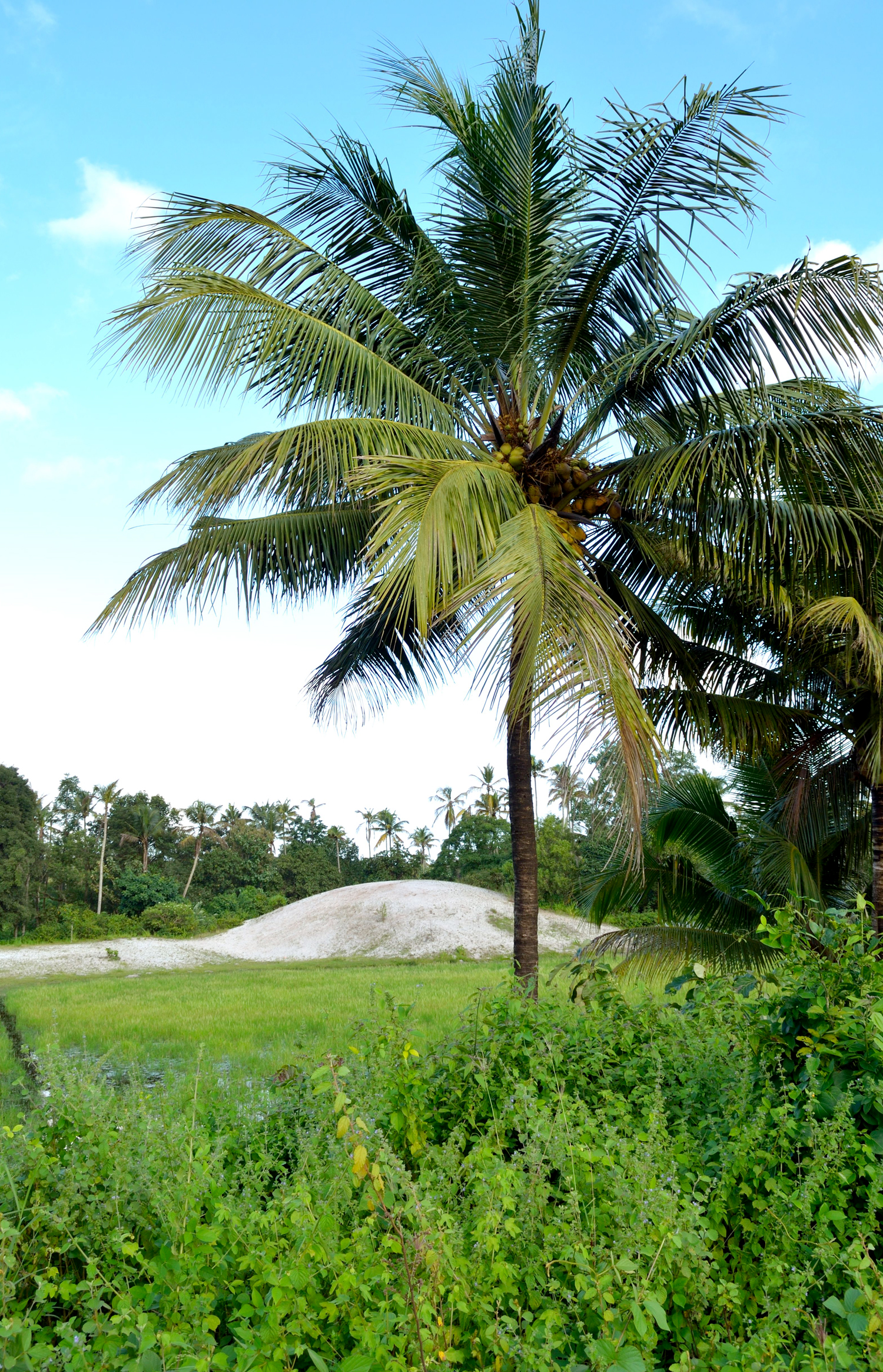
- A view of Pachara Manal

- Location in Kerala, India Thycattusserry (India)
- Coordinates: 9°46′30″N 76°20′10″E
- Country: India
- State: Kerala
- District: Alappuzha

Population (2011)
  - Total: 20,874

Languages
  - Official: Malayalam, English
- Time zone: UTC+5:30 (IST)
- PIN: 688528
- Telephone code: 91478253
- Vehicle registration: KL-32
- Nearest city: Cochin, Cherthala
- Sex ratio: 1000:1015 ♂/♀
- Literacy: 91.5%
- Lok Sabha constituency: Alappuzha
- Niyamasabha constituency: Aroor

Thycattusserry is a village in the Cherthala taluk of the Alappuzha district in the Indian state of Kerala.

== Demographics ==
As of 2011 India census, Thycattusserry had a population of 20,874 with 10,242 males and 10,632 females. Thycattusserry is situated in Pallippuram Islands, 35 km north of Alappuzha and 30 km south of Kochi. The major income source of this place is fishing and coir industry. Thycattusserry is geographically surrounded by Vembanad lake and its tributaries.

Thycattusserry is famous for 'Panchara Manal' [Silica sand], the major raw material used in glass and cement industry.

== Educational institutions ==
The major educational Institutions in Thycattusserry are

- SMSJHS Thycattusserry,
- Govt.HS Thevarvattom,
- St. Theresa's HS Manappuram,
- MDUPS Maniyathrikkal,
- St. Mary's LPS Srambikkal,
- Govt.UPS Thycattusserry
- Govt.LP School, Ulavaipu
- Govt.LP School, Manappuram
- Rajagiri St. Chavara CMI Public School, Manappuram

== Industry ==
The main industry here is based on the products from the humble coconut tree. The coconut oil is used for cooking, as hair oil and in manufacture of soap. The coir extracted from the husk of the coconut tree is used for making rope, door mats, carpets and as protection against soil erosion.

Fishing and allied industries is another major source of livelihood. The place is endowed with a network of canals which are invariably connected with either the Arabian sea on the west or the Vembanad back waters on the east side. Of late prawn farming has caught up with the place. The prawn mainly go into the export market.

Poochakkal is a big town and economical capital of Thycattusserry situated in Cherthala-Arookutty Bus route.

== Temples ==
- Thycattusserry Punnakkeezhil Sreekurumba & Kothesivapuram Temple [One of the famous temples in Alappuzha District]
- Thaikkathrikkayil Temple
- Nadubhagom Maniya Thrikkayil Temple
- Subrahmanyapuram Temple Thycattusserry
- Nadubhagom Sivasubrahmanyapuram Temple [Ardhanareeswara Temple]
- Nagari Sree Dharmasastha Temple
- Gowrinatha Temple Makkekadavu
- Elikkattu Sreedharmasastha Temple
- Thycattuserry Bhagavathy "MOOLASTHANAM" at Eloor KALARY Thevarvattom
- Ulavaipu Mahadeva Temple
- Aduvayil Mahadeva Temple
- Attupuram Sree Gandharva Swamy Temple
- Dhandapanipuram Bala Subrahmanya Temple, Ulavaipu

== Masjid ==
- Thevarvattom Masjid,

== Churches ==
- St. Antony's Church
- St. Mary's Church Srambikkal
- Valliara Church
- Little flower Church, Manappuram
- St. Martin De Porres Church Ulavaipu
- Baptism Church
- Church at Thycattussery (Thycattussery Sabha)

== Railway ==
- The nearest Railway station is Thuravoor [2.5 km from village Headquarters]
- Cherthala [Shertallai] 14 km away from village Headquarters.

== Waterway ==
Thycattusserry lies between the Kottapuram-Kollam National Inland Waterway passing through the Vembanad lake. Prior to the coming of NH-47 the cargo and freight from Cochin market was transported in country boats through the Vembanad lake via the small lake diverting from Arukutty-Kudapuram-Ulavaipu[Kaithappuzha Lake]. Now these country boats are no more used for cargo transportation, instead converted into tourist floating house boats. We can reach Vaikom by the Tavankadav-Vaikom ferry service covering approx 3.5 km across the Vembanad lake and joining the Kottayam district at Vaikom jetty and also Jangar Servises to reach Thuravoor from Thycattusserry and Nerekadavu[Vaikom] from Makkekadavu.

== Local places in Thycattusserry ==
- P.S.Kavala
- Poochakkal
- Maniyathikkal
- Srambickal
- Makkekadavu
- Thevarvattom
- Nagari
- Cheerathukad
- Santhikkavala, is the south border junction of Thycattusserry.
- Paniyath
- Thandappally
- Ulavaipu [Ambedkar Gramam]
- Polekkadavu
- Manakkal Bhagom
- Chudukattum Puram
- Ulavaipu Kadathu Kadavu
- Appola Junction, Ulavaipu

== Notable people ==
- Ganesh Puthur, poet, winner of Yuva Puraskar.
