= Pollachi Junction railway station =

Railway junction serving the town of Pollachi, Tamil Nadu

Pollachi Junction
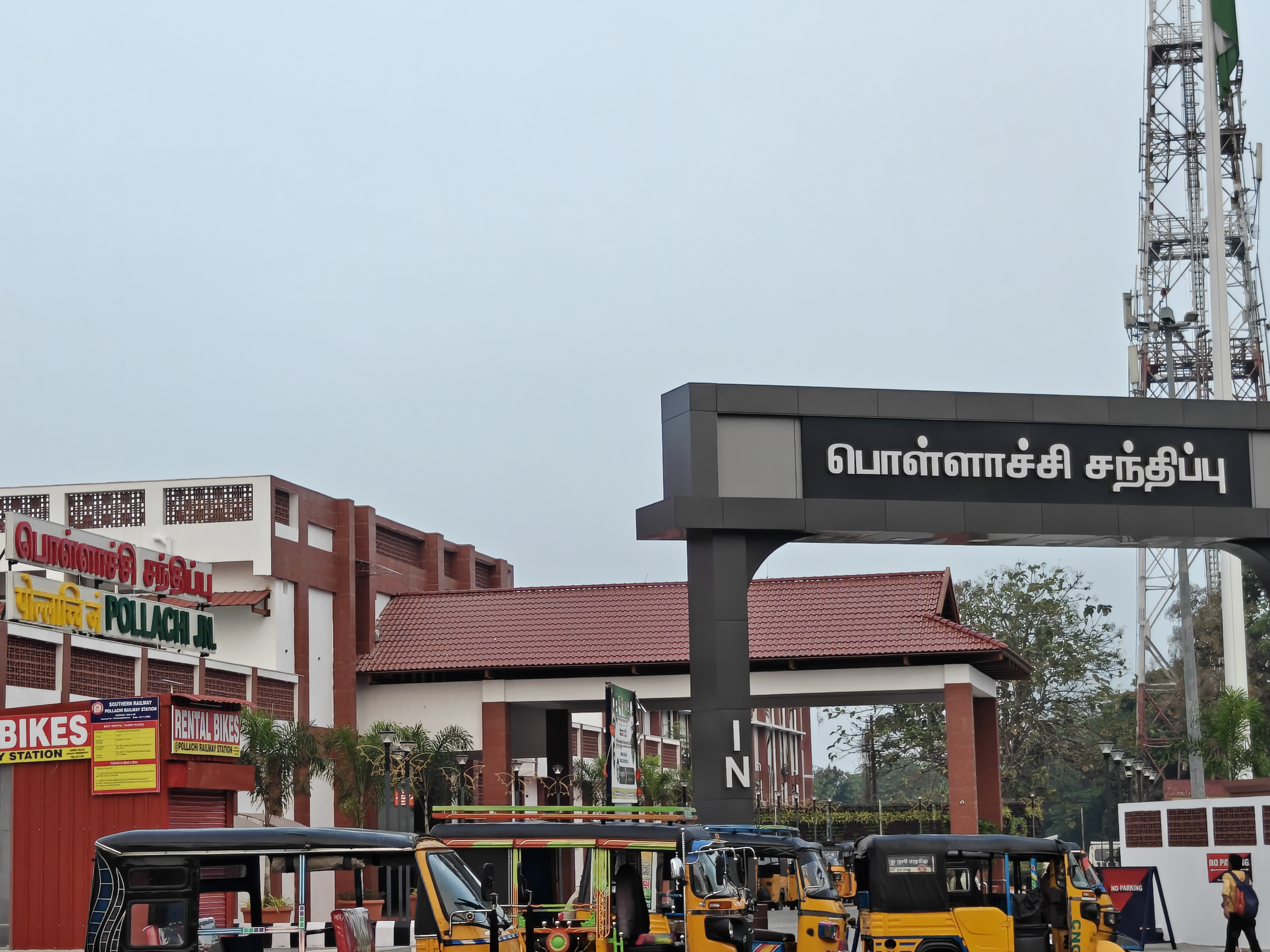

General information
- Location: Railway Station road, Pollachi, Tamil Nadu; India
- Coordinates: 10.6529°N 77.0011°E
- Elevation: 390 metres (1,280 ft)
- System: Express train and Passenger train station
- Owner: Indian Railways
- Operator: Southern Railway zone
- Platforms: 3
- Tracks: 5 (3 passenger platform lines + 1 stabling line + 1 freight platform line)
- Connections: Bus, taxi, auto rickshaw

Construction
- Structure type: Standard (on ground station)
- Parking: Yes
- Accessible: Disabled access

Other information
- Status: Active
- Station code: POY
- Zone(s): Southern Railway zone
- Division(s): Palakkad
- Fare zone: Southern Railway zone

History
- Opened: 15 October 1890; 135 years ago
- Closed: 2009; 17 years ago
- Rebuilt: 2015; 11 years ago
- Electrified: Single-line electrification
Route map
Location
- Location within Tamil Nadu

Pollachi Junction railway station (station code: POY) is an NSG–5 category Indian railway station in Palakkad railway division of Southern Railway zone. It is a historical railway junction serving the town of Pollachi, Tamil Nadu. This station is a part of the Palakkad railway division of Southern Railway Zone.

== History ==
Pollachi Junction was first used as a train station for trade in the 1850s. After 1900, it was used as a station for passengers.

The first service started in 1915 from Pollachi to Podanur line as metre-gauge section. In 2008, the station was closed for the gauge conversion of the Dindigul–Podanur.

On 25 November 2014, CRS successfully completed a speed trial and inspection along the Pollachi–Palani broad-gauge line. After seven years of construction, Pollachi Junction–Palani broad-gauge line was opened for commercial use on 9 January 2015.

The old metre-gauge track on the stretch was in use for 110 years, from 1898 until it was closed in 2008 for the conversion.

On 6 October 2015, CRS successfully completed a speed trial and Inspection on the Palakkad Town–Pollachi Junction broad-gauge line. The distance of 54 km was covered in 38 minutes by CRS Special Train. The line was opened for commercial use on 16 November 2015.

On 24 March 2017, CRS successfully completed a speed trial and inspection along the Podanur–Pollachi broad-gauge line.

Electrification between Pollachi Jn and Podanur Jn has been successfully completed and speed trial conducted on 20 September 2021 successfully and The Commissioner of Railway Safety approved the line for Passenger Traffic.

Electrification between Pollachi Jn and Palghat Town was also completed along with Pollachi and Dindigul sector.

== Lines ==
The station is a junction formed by the intersection of three single lines:

- Dindigul via Udumalapettai, Palani and Oddanchatram.
- Coimbatore via Kinathukadavu, Chettipalayam, and podanur.
- Palakkad Junction via Meenachipuram, Muthalamada, Kollengode, and Palakkad Town station.

== Projects and development ==
It is one of the 73 stations in Tamil Nadu to be named for upgradation under Amrit Bharat Station Scheme of Indian Railways.
