= Palakkad Junction railway station =

Railway station in Kerala, India

Palakkad Junction Olavakkode Junction
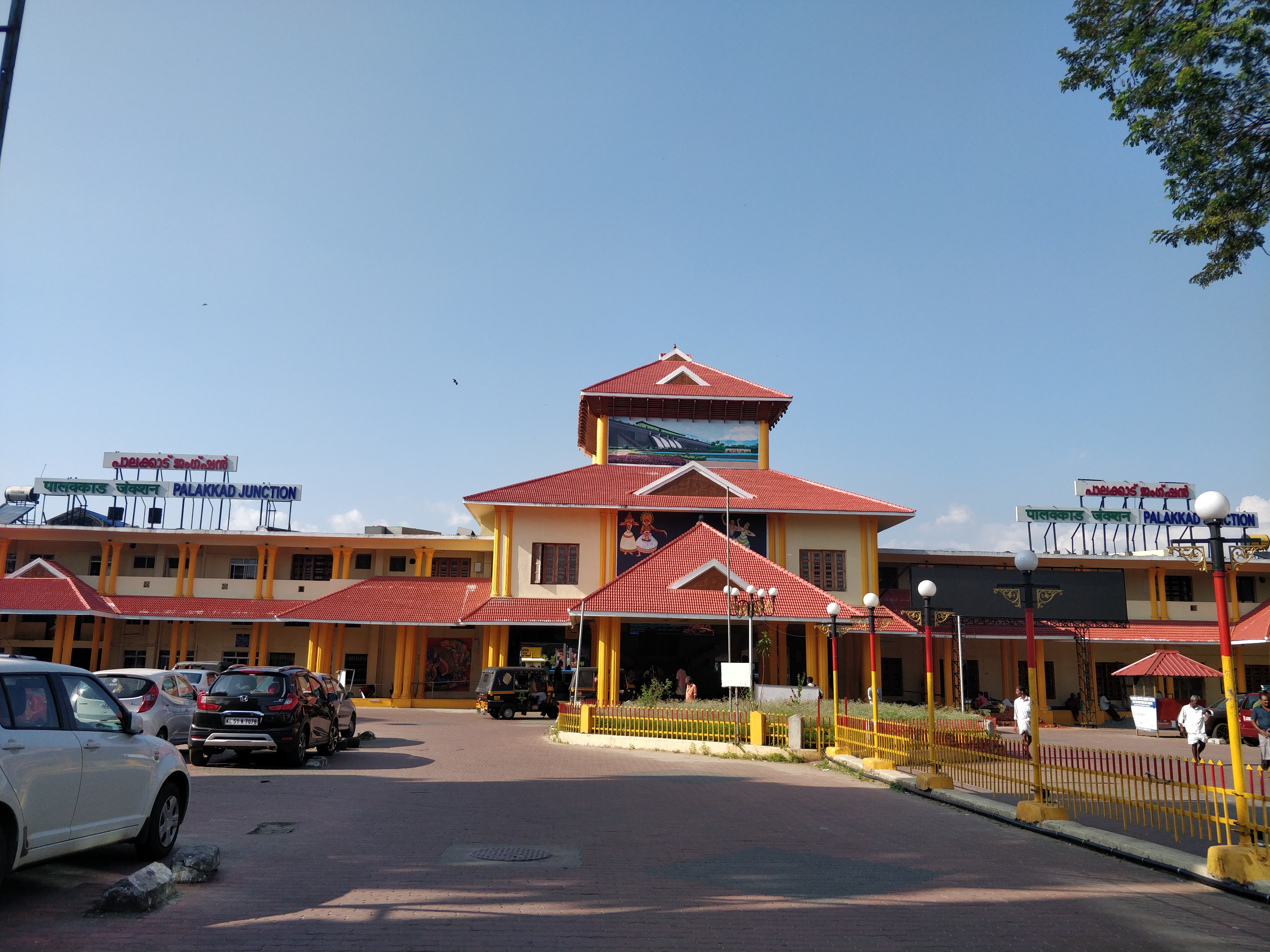
- The main entrance to the Palakkad Junction railway station

General information
- Location: Railway Station Road, NH 966, Olavakkode, Palakkad, Kerala, India.
- Coordinates: 10.801°N 76.639°E
- Elevation: 84 metres (276 ft)
- System: Indian Railways station
- Owner: Government of India
- Operator: Indian Railways
- Lines: Jolarpettai–Shoranur line Palakkad–Pollachi line
- Platforms: 5
- Tracks: 13

Construction
- Parking: Available
- Accessible: Disabled access

Other information
- Status: Functioning
- Station code: PGT
- Zone(s): Southern Railway zone
- Division(s): Palakkad

History
- Opened: 1898; 128 years ago
- Rebuilt: 1904
- Former names: Olavakkode Junction

Passengers
- 50,0000: 21,898 per day 0% (-)
Location
- Location within India Location within Kerala
- Interactive map

Palakkad Junction (formerly Olavakkode Junction) (station code: PGT) is an NSG–2 category Indian railway station in Palakkad railway division of Southern Railway zone. It is one of the largest railway stations in Kerala, India, situated in the city of Palakkad. Palakkad Junction was declared the cleanest railway station in the state of Kerala as per a Swachh Bharat Mission survey in 2016. Palakkad Junction serves as the major railway hub for the city of Palakkad, while the secondary hub is Palakkad Town railway station.

== Lines ==
Palakkad Junction is located on Jolarpettai–Shoranur line and is the terminating point for the Palakkad–Madurai rail line. The other station serving the city is Palakkad Town railway station.

== Infrastructure ==
The station is served by five platforms. Platforms 1, 2, and 3 are used for trains going towards Palakkad Town, Shoranur, Thrissur, while Platforms 4 and 5 are mainly used for travelling towards Chennai. The electronic interlocking system, which will replace the prevailing route relay interlocking system, was completed.

A Mainline Electric Multiple Unit (MEMU) shed operates to maintain the suburban trains, and is the first in the state.
