= Malabar Express =

Express train service in South India

Overview
- Service type: Express
- Locale: Kerala & Karnataka
- First service: 5 March 1888; 138 years ago
- Current operator: South Western Railways

Route
- Termini: Mangalore Central (MAQ); Thiruvananthapuram Central (TVC)
- Stops: 50
- Distance travelled: 634 km (394 mi)
- Average journey time: 15 hours 50 minutes
- Service frequency: Daily
- Train number: 16629 / 16630

On-board services
- Classes: AC 3 tier, AC 2 tier, Sleeper class, General Unreserved
- Seating arrangements: Yes
- Sleeping arrangements: Yes
- Catering facilities: On-board catering E-catering
- Baggage facilities: Available

Technical
- Rolling stock: ICF coach
- Track gauge: 1,676 mm (5 ft 6 in)
- Operating speed: 41 km/h (25 mph) average including halts

The Malabar Express is a daily night express train service in India, named after the Malabar Coast, the south-western coastal region of India that runs from Mangalore Central (MAQ) and Thiruvananthapuram Central (TVC) in the capital of the State of Kerala. As the name suggests, it connects the two ends of the Malabar region (the Southern and the Northern). This train has one of the longest running time between Mangaluru Central and Thiruvananthapuram Central and it is the slowest train among all other trains from Mangaluru Central to Thiruvananthapuram Central and vice versa.

== History ==
The train initially ran between Mangalore and Cochin Harbour Terminus (Ernakulam) from 1963 & later extended to Thiruvanathapuram Central on conversion of railway line to Thiruvanathapuram via Kottayam to broad gauge in 1976.

== Traction ==
It is hauled by an Erode based WAP-4 or Royapuram based WAP-7 electric locomotive on its entire journey.

== Service ==
This train runs between Mangalore Central and Thiruvananthapuram Central. The train no. 16629 starts from Trivandrum at 06:40 PM hours and reaches Mangalore at 10:15 AM hours the next day. In the return direction, train no. 16630 leaves Mangalore at 06:15 PM hours and reaches Trivandrum at 08:30 AM hours the next day. It runs via Trunk route Kottayam

== Coach composition ==
It has 23 coaches (10 sleeper class, 4 3-tier AC, 1 2-tier AC, 1 AC first class-cum-2-tier, 5 second class, and 2 brake van-cum-second sitter).

== Route and halts ==
This train has 51 halts. Some of the halts are:

- Mangaluru Central
- Ullal
- Manjeshwar
- Uppala
- Kumbla
- Kasaragod
- Kotikulam
- Bekal Fort
- Kanhangad
- Nileshwar
- Cheruvathur
- Thrikaripur
- Payyanur
- Ezhimala
- Payangadi
- Kannapuram
- Valapattanam
- Kannur
- Thalassery
- Mahe
- Vadakara
- Koyilandy
- Kozhikode
- Ferok
- Parappanangadi
- Tanur
- Tirur
- Kuttippuram
- Pattambi
- Shoranur Junction
- Thrissur
- Chalakudy
- Angamali for Kaladi
- Aluva
- Ernakulam Town
- Piravom
- Kottayam
- Changanacherry
- Tiruvalla
- Chengannur
- Mavelikara
- Kayamkulam Junction
- Karunagappalli
- Sasthamkotta
- Paravur
- Kollam
- Varkala Sivagiri
- Kadakkavoor
- Chirayinkeezhu
- Murukkampuzha
- Kazhakuttam
- Thiruvananthapuram Pettah
- Thiruvananthapuram Central

== See also ==
- West Coast Express
- Mangalore Central railway station
- Thiruvananthapuram Central railway station
