= Mangaluru–Chennai Mail =

Train in India

Mangaluru – Chennai Superfast Mail
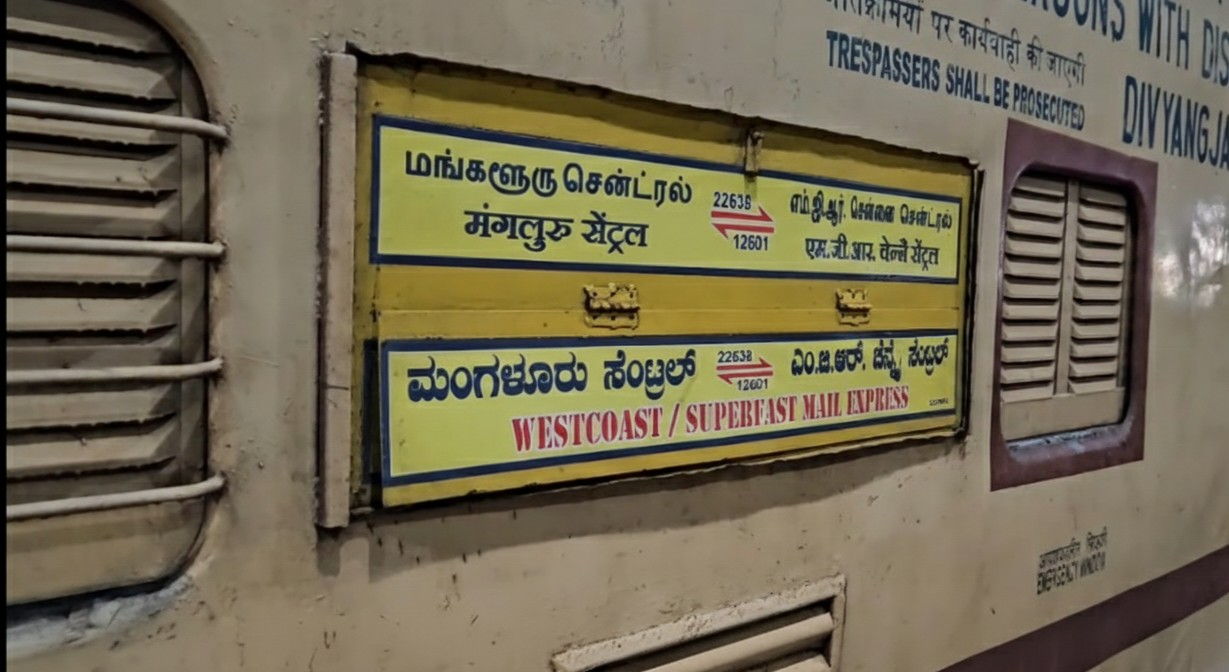
- MAS - MAQ Superfast Mail Train board

Overview
- Service type: Express/Mail
- Locale: Tamil Nadu, Kerala and Karnataka
- First service: 1 July 1867; 159 years ago
- Current operator: South Western Railways

Route
- Termini: Chennai Central; Mangaluru Central
- Stops: 31
- Distance travelled: 901 km (560 mi)
- Average journey time: 16 Hrs 20 minutes
- Service frequency: Daily
- Train number: 12601 / 12602

On-board services
- Classes: Second AC, Third AC, Sleeper Class, General Unreserved, First Ac
- Seating arrangements: Yes
- Sleeping arrangements: Yes
- Auto-rack arrangements: Yes
- Catering facilities: On Board
- Observation facilities: Large windows
- Entertainment facilities: No
- Baggage facilities: Under Seat & RMS
- Other facilities: -

Technical
- Rolling stock: Wap 4/ Wap 7 & LHB Dedicated Rake
- Track gauge: 1,676 mm (5 ft 6 in)
- Electrification: 100%
- Operating speed: 55 km/h (34 mph) average with halts, 120 km/h (75 mph) maximum
Route map
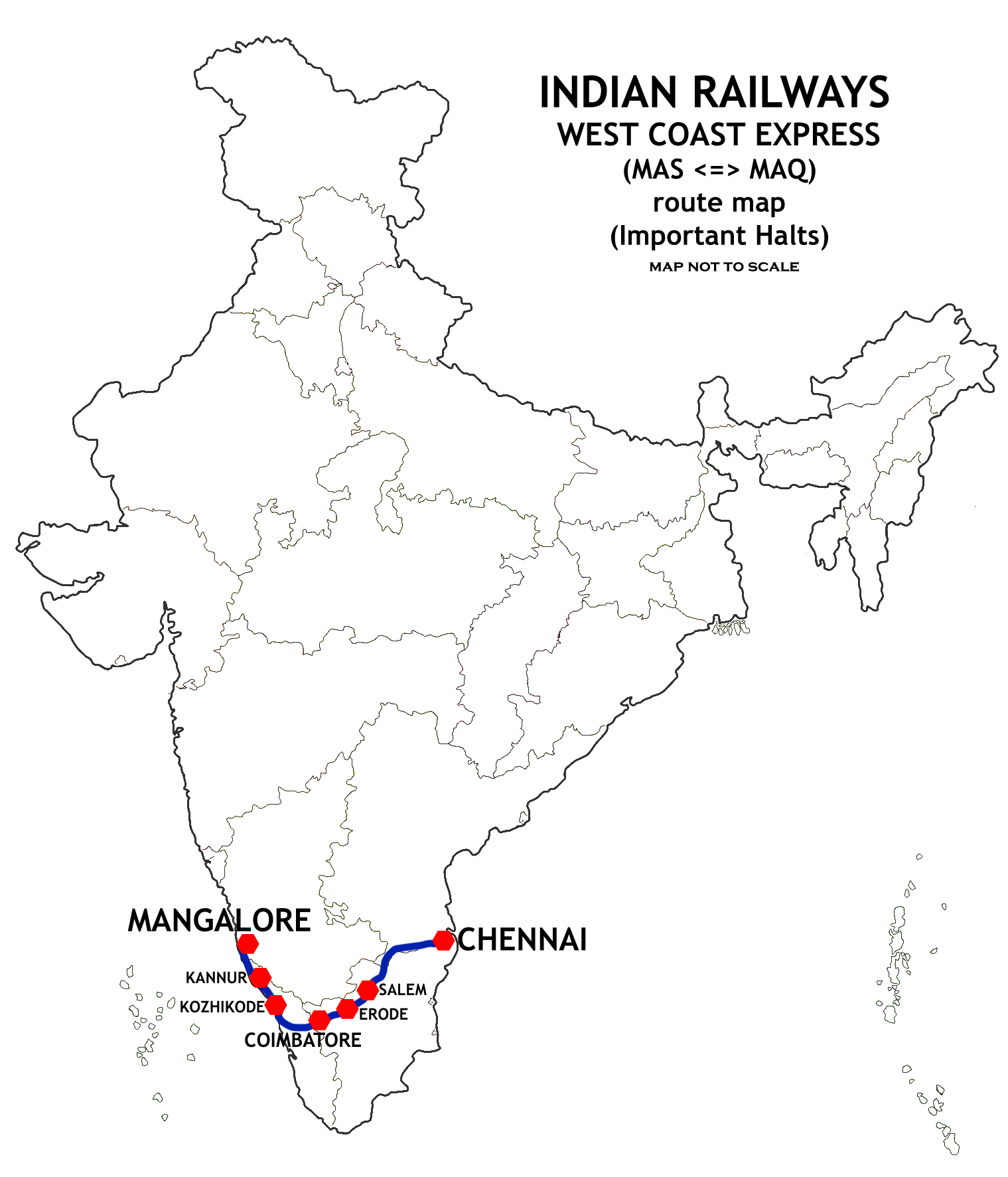

The 12601 / 12602 Mangaluru Central–MGR Chennai Central Mail is a Superfast Mail daily train operated by the Indian Railways belonging to South Western Railway zone that runs between Chennai Central (Madras) of Tamil Nadu and Mangaluru Central of Karnataka in India. It is one of the oldest train still being operated by Indian Railways. Earlier it ran from Madras Royapuram to Kozhikode (Calicut). When the line was extended up to Mangaluru, it ran up to Mangaluru Central from Royapuram Chennai. When Madras Central was built, the train's terminus was changed to Chennai Central from Royapuram and it ran as the Madras Central - Mangaluru Central Malabar Express. Till 1907, it ran as Malabar Express, after that its name was changed to Chennai/Mangaluru Mail. It was one of the prestigious train in Indian Railways. It runs always full by having more stoppages in northern Kerala beginning from Palakkad Junction to Kasaragod. It also has nine stoppages at Tamilnadu and it does not have any other stoppages in Karnataka except Mangaluru Central.

== History ==
Originally, It was introduced as Mangalore - Madras Malabar Express on 1 July 1867, which had train number 1/2 and as Mangalore/Chennai Mail from 1887. It was one single Composite Train called as "01UP/02DOWN Mail" from Madras to Old Coimbatore (Now Podanur) and from there to Chaliyam (now Beypore in Calicut). Its inaugural run was on 1 July 1867. It did not have a name until 1887. The train was split into the Nilgiri Express in 1864 and the Malabar Mail in 1867. The Kerala Mainline was further extended to Kumbla (near Mangaluru) which was completed on 3 July 1907. Because of this the Malabar Mail was renamed into the Mangalore Mail and The present day Malabar Express was introduced as an altogether new train from Mangalore to Cochin Harbour Terminus in 1963. Later when the metre gauge from Ernakulam to Kollam was converted to broad gauge, this train was extended to Thiruvananthapuram in 1976 bearing numbers 16629/30 now. At present Chennai-Mangalore central mail runs with train numbers 12601/12602. It was the first-ever train to enter Kerala with electric locomotive.

== Routes and halts ==
The Important Halts of the train are :

● MGR Chennai Central

● Tiruvallur

● Arakkonam Junction

● Walajah Road

● Katpadi Junction

● Jolarpettai Junction

● Salem Junction

● Erode Junction

● Tiruppur

● Podanur Junction

● Ottappalam

● Shoranur Junction

● Pattambi

● Kuttipuram

● Tirur

● Tanur

● Parappanangadi

● Ferok

● Kozhikode

● Quilandi

● Vadakara

● Mahe

● Thalassery

● Kannur

● Pazhayangadi

● Payyanur

● Charvattur

● Kanhangad

● Kasaragod

● Mangaluru Central

== Rake sharing ==
The train shares its rake with the West Coast Express.

== Locomotive link ==
earlier first run was WDM-2. As the route is fully electrified now it is hauled by a WAP-7 or WAP-4 locomotive from Royapuram.

== Kadalundi River Train Disaster ==
the Mangaluru-Chennai Mail accident involved in Kadalundi train derailment when the Mangalore-Chennai Mail passenger train was crossing over the Kadalundi river. Three carriages fell into the water, with 59 people reported killed or missing, and up to 300 believed injured. The official inquiry concluded that the derailment was caused by one pillar of the 140-year-old bridge sinking into the riverbed, following recent heavy rain, though this finding has been challenged.
