= Kallekulangara =

Kallekulangara Hemambika Nagar
- Suburb
- Location in Kerala, India Kallekulangara (India)
- Coordinates: 10°49′N 76°39′E
- Country: India
- State: Kerala
- District: Palakkad

Government
  - Body: Akathethara Panchayat

Languages
  - Official: Malayalam, English
- Time zone: UTC+5:30 (IST)
- PIN: 678 009
- Telephone code: 0491
- Vehicle registration: KL-09
- Parliament constituency: Palakkad
- Assembly constituency: Malampuzha

Kallekulangara is an area in Palakkad city, Kerala, India. Kallekulangara is famous for Sree Emoor Bhagavathy temple which is believed to be consecrated by Parashurama and Hemambika Devi is the deity, due to this Kallekulangara is also known by Hemambika Nagar. Head office of Palakkad railway division of Southern Railway zone and a residential colony of the railway employees under Southern Railway known as Hemambika Nagar railway colony is located here.

== Education ==
- NSS College of Engineering, Palakkad
- Railway High School Palakkad
- Kendriya Vidyalaya No.1, Palakkad
- St.Thomas Convent Higher Secondary School
- Hemambika Sanskrit High School
- CBKM GHSS, Puthuppariyaram
- Govt. High School Ummini
