= TKQ =

TKQ or tkq may refer to:

- TKQ, the IATA airport code for Kigoma Airport, Ujiji, Tanzania
- TKQ, the Indian Railways station code for Thrikaripur railway station, Kerala, India
- tkq, the ISO 639-3 code for Tee language, Rivers State, Nigeria
