= Bekal (disambiguation) =

Bekal a town in Kerala, India.

Bekal may also refer to:

- Bekal Fort, the largest fort in Kerala
- Bekal Fort railway station
- Bekal (name)
