= Palakkad Railway Colony =

Palakkad Railway Colony Hemambika Nagar Railway Colony
- Residential Area/Suburb
- Location in Kerala, India Palakkad Railway Colony (India)
- Coordinates: 10°49′N 76°39′E
- Country: India
- State: Kerala
- District: Palakkad

Government
  - Body: Puthuppariyaram Panchayat

Languages
  - Official: Malayalam, English
- Time zone: UTC+5:30 (IST)
- PIN: 678 009
- Telephone code: 0491
- Vehicle registration: KL-09
- Parliament constituency: Palakkad
- Assembly constituency: Malampuzha

Palakkad Railway Colony, or Hemambika Nagar Railway Colony, is a residential colony of the employees of the Palakkad Railway Division of the Southern Railway zone. It is situated in Hemambika Nagar, one of the suburbs of the city, located about 9 km from the centre of the city. It is one of the colonies which are maintained and are under Southern Railway.The railway colony was managed like a gated community which was self-sustaining with modern infrastructure of that time period. Within the colony precinct, Railway hospital, Railway high school, sports stadiums, indoor sporting facilities, Nursery schools, Auditorium for Arts Performance, condiment stores, Power back up generators, Water supply network and so on are present. Residents did not have to rely on state government support for many amenities. The only school in Kerala under Southern Railway, Railway High School Palakkad is located inside the colony.

== Transportation ==
There are city buses connecting railway colony with other parts.These bus service starts from Stadium Bus Stand.
