= Dharmadam railway station =

Railway station in Kerala, India

Dharmadam
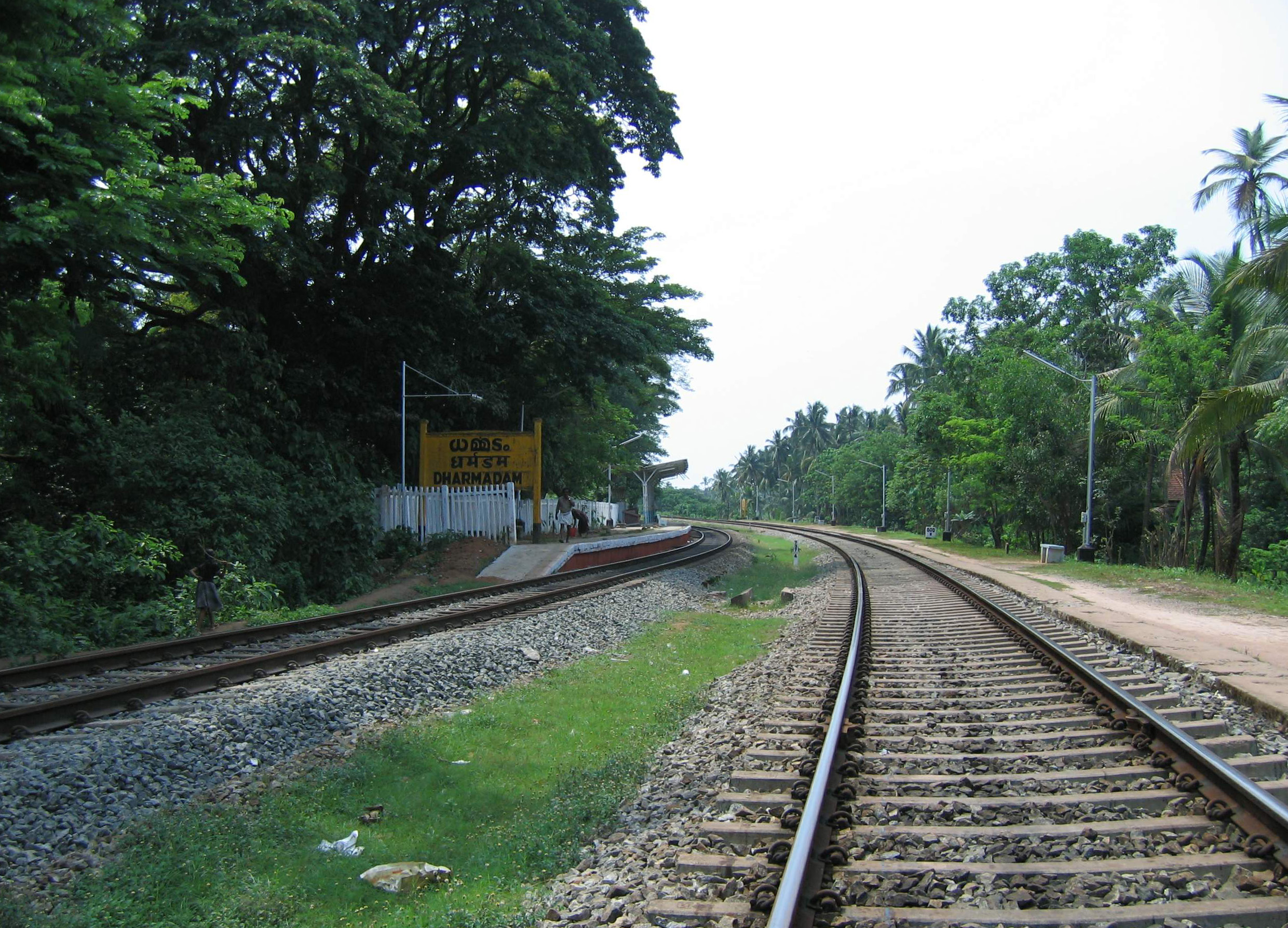
- Dharmadom Railway Station ( in 2012)

General information
- Location: Dharmadam, Kannur, Kerala; India
- Coordinates: 11.77871°N 75.46334°E
- System: Regional rail, Light rail & Commuter rail station
- Owner: Indian Railways
- Operator: Southern Railway zone
- Line: Shoranur–Mangalore line
- Platforms: 2
- Tracks: 2

Construction
- Structure type: At–grade
- Parking: Available

Other information
- Status: Functioning
- Station code: DRMD
- Zone(s): Southern Railway zone
- Division(s): Palakkad
- Fare zone: Indian Railways

History
- Opened: 1904; 122 years ago
Location
- Location within India Location within Kerala

Dharmadam railway station is a railway station in Tellicherry, Kannur district, Kerala. It falls under the Palakkad railway division of the Southern Railway zone, Indian Railways. The station code is DMD. It has two platforms.

In the 2026-2027 budget, the Kerala government has sanctioned Rs.5 crore for the construction of a Dharmadam railway station underpass.
