= Valapattanam railway station =

Railway station in Kerala, India

Valapattanam

General information
- Location: Valapattanam, Kannur, Kerala; India
- Coordinates: 11.92729°N 75.34629°E
- System: Regional rail, Light rail & Commuter rail station
- Owner: Indian Railways
- Operator: Southern Railway zone
- Line: Shoranur–Mangalore line
- Platforms: 3
- Tracks: 3

Construction
- Structure type: At–grade
- Parking: Available

Other information
- Status: Functioning
- Station code: VLPM
- Zone(s): Southern Railway zone
- Division(s): Palakkad
- Fare zone: Indian Railways

History
- Opened: 1904; 122 years ago
Location
- Location within India Location within Kerala

Valapattanam railway station (station code: VAPM) is an NSG–6 category Indian railway station in Palakkad railway division of Southern Railway zone. It is a railway station in Kannur district, Kerala and falls under the Palakkad railway division of the Southern Railway zone, Indian Railways.
