= Jaganath Temple Gate railway station =

Railway station in Kerala, India

Jaganath Temple
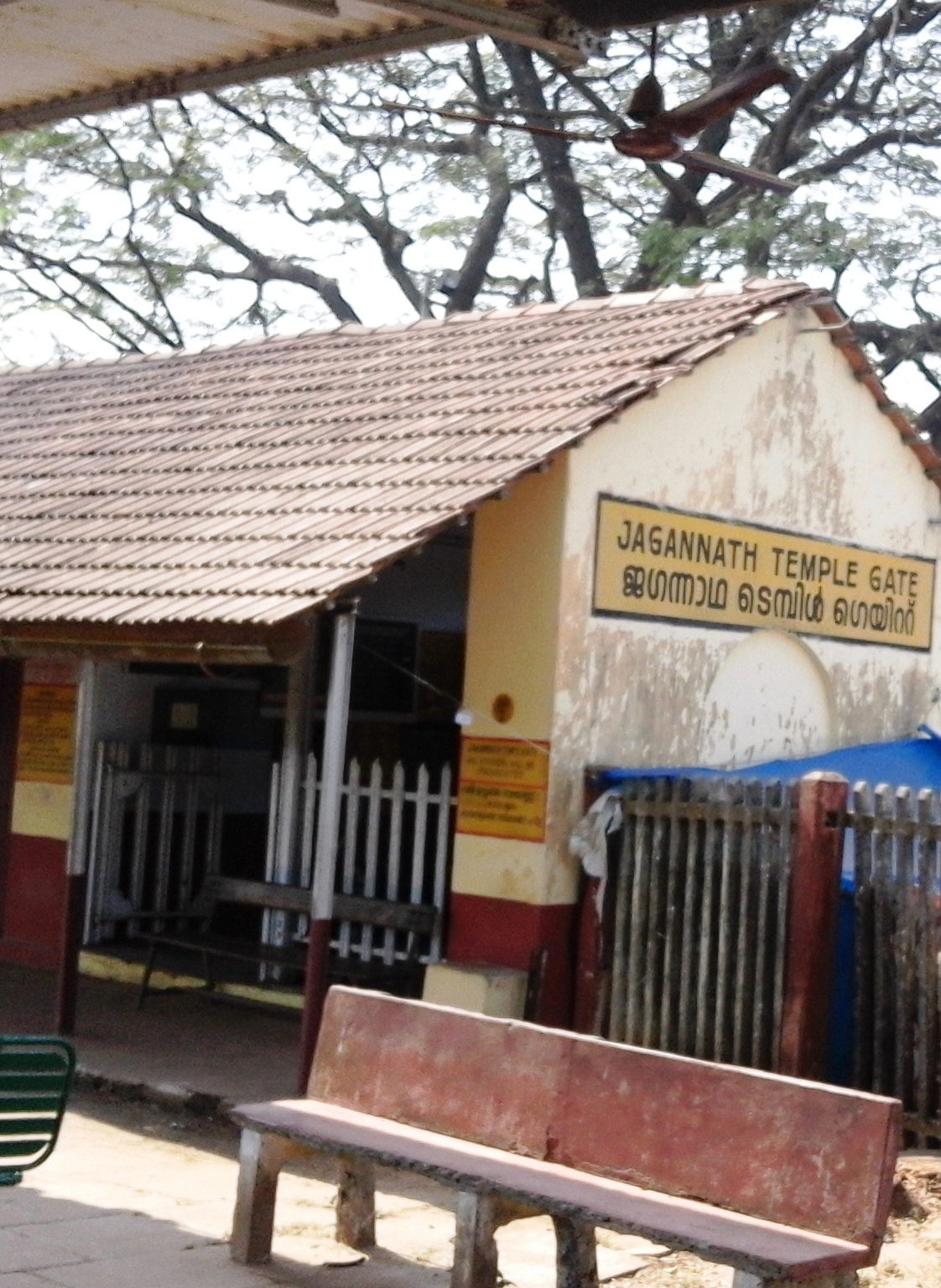
- Jagannath Temple Gate railway station, Thalassery, Kerala

General information
- Location: Thalassery, Kannur, Kerala; India
- Coordinates: 11.73873°N 75.50811°E
- System: Regional rail, Light rail & Commuter rail station
- Owner: Indian Railways
- Operator: Southern Railway zone
- Line: Shoranur–Mangalore line
- Platforms: 2
- Tracks: 2

Construction
- Structure type: At–grade
- Parking: Available

Other information
- Status: Functioning
- Station code: JGE
- Zone(s): Southern Railway zone
- Division(s): Palakkad
- Fare zone: Indian Railways

History
- Opened: 1904; 122 years ago
- Electrified: yes (recently in 2022)
Location
- Location within India Location within Kerala

Jagannath Temple railway station is a railway station in the Southern Railways zone, in Kannur district, Kerala. The station code is JGE. It falls under the Palakkad railway division of the Southern Railway zone, Indian Railways. It has two platforms.
