= Ezhimala railway station =

Railway station in Kerala, India

Ezhimala (Elimala)

General information
- Location: Ezhimala, Kannur, Kerala; India
- Coordinates: 12.08900°N 75.19606°E
- System: Regional rail, Light rail & Commuter rail station
- Owner: Indian Railways
- Operator: Southern Railway zone
- Line: Shoranur–Mangalore line
- Platforms: 2
- Tracks: 2

Construction
- Structure type: At–grade
- Parking: Available

Other information
- Status: Functioning
- Station code: ELM
- Zone(s): Southern Railway zone
- Division(s): Palakkad
- Fare zone: Indian Railways

History
- Opened: 1904; 122 years ago
Location
- Location within India Location within Kerala

Ezhimala railway station is a railway station in the Southern Railways zone, in Kannur district, Kerala. It falls under the Palakkad railway division of the Southern Railway zone, Indian Railways. The station code is ELM.

The station caters to the nearby Ezhimala Naval Academy.
