= Bekal (name) =

Bekal is both a given name and a surname. Notable people with the name include:

- Bekal Utsahi (1928–2016), Indian poet, writer, and politician
- Nalini Bekal (born 1954), Malayalam novelist and short story writer

== See also ==
- Bekal (disambiguation)
