= Podanur Railway Division =

Podanur was located four miles to the southeast of Coimbatore in the Indian state of Tamil Nadu, and is now a suburb of that city. The Podanur railway division dates back to the construction of the railway station at this town by the then Madras Railway, which later became the South Indian Railway broad gauge (BG) Jalarpet-Mangalore Mainline. Following the further developments by Madras Railway in the Mangalore-Malabar region, Shoranur-Cochin Section, Bangalore, Kolar Gold Fields railway, Nilgiri Mountain Railway, a division has been established encompassing of these regions around 1901 post acquisition of the East Coast State Railway by the Madras Railway.

== Establishment and operation ==
Podanur Railway Junction was established by the Madras Railway Company in 1863. It was the third functional railway station within the boundaries of the present day Tamil Nadu behind the Royapuram.

Madras Railway had two Divisions i.e. Madras Division and Podanur division. It was the coming of the South Indian Railway towards the end of the 19th century that brought about the magical transformation. Because of its central location, between Madras to Cochin, Madras to Mangalore, Ooty's Nilgiris Mountain Railway, down to the southern parts of the then Madras Presidency, it became the second important centre of the South Indian Railway system after Madras being the headquarters. Podanur had the vital Railway Workshop, till 1940. From 1940 its importance began to decrease when the main Railway workshop was gradually shifted to Golden Rock Trichnopoly and just as a consolation prize the Signal and Telecom workshop was left behind!

After the formation of India's first Railway Zone i.e., Southern Railway in 14 April 1951, Podanur became officially the first railway division of India as well as Indian Railways because the division was in existence since Madras Railways and directly became a railway division under the newly formed zone.

== Dissolution and new headquarters ==
Till 30 August 1956, this division was functioning with the headquarters at Podanur but on 31 August 1956, the divisional headquarters has been shifted to the Olavakkode Junction (i.e. the present day Palakkad Junction) which is a Suburbs of the Palakkad and renamed as Palakkad Railway Division. Hon'ble Deputy Railway Minister Shri Alagesan announce in parliament to introduce a new railway divisional system on the Southern Railway with headquarter in the Kerala area in which the hon. Member is interested at Olavakkode. The Podanur Division got dissolved since then, but still the Olavakkode divisional control office (i.e. headquarters) has been functional in Podanur till 1958 and later shifted to Olavakkode. The new Olavakkode divisional headquarters has been inaugurated in Palakkad in August 1962 and till then, it has been functioning in a temporary building in Olavakkode.
