= Stadium Bus Stand Palakkad =

Stadium Bus Stand, Palakkad സ്റ്റേഡിയം സ്റ്റാൻഡ്

General information
- Location: Sheshadri Nagar, Koppam, Palakkad, Kerala 678013; India
- Coordinates: 10°46′24.86″N 76°39′45.16″E
- System: Bus station
- Owner: Palakkad Municipality
- Operator: Palakkad Municipality

Construction
- Structure type: At Grade
- Parking: Yes
Location

Stadium Bus Stand is located on the heart of the Palakkad City, near the Indira Gandhi Municipal Stadium in Kerala, India.

Stadium Bus Stand is the largest Private Bus Stand in the city of Palakkad. Palakkad City has four Bus Stations includes Palakkad KSRTC bus station and three private Bus stands named Stadium bus stand, municipal bus stand, and town bus stand.

Small and executive restaurants, hotels, and shopping centres are close by the stand.

== Service ==
Private bus services to Kozhikode, Sulthan Bathery, Pollachi, Thrissur, Malampuzha, Railway Colony, Chittur, Kollengode, Kozhinjampara, Walayar, kuzhalmanam start in Palakkad.

== Construction ==
Construction of a new terminal near the current bus stand, funded by the Palakkad Municipality's Amrut fund, began in 2019.

To improve access from the north, a bypass to the station was proposed in 2014. It has been partially built but not completed.

== See also ==
- Palakkad
- Palakkad District
- Palakkad Junction railway station
- Palakkad KSRTC bus terminal
