= Thalassery railway station =

Railway station in Kerala, India

Thalassery
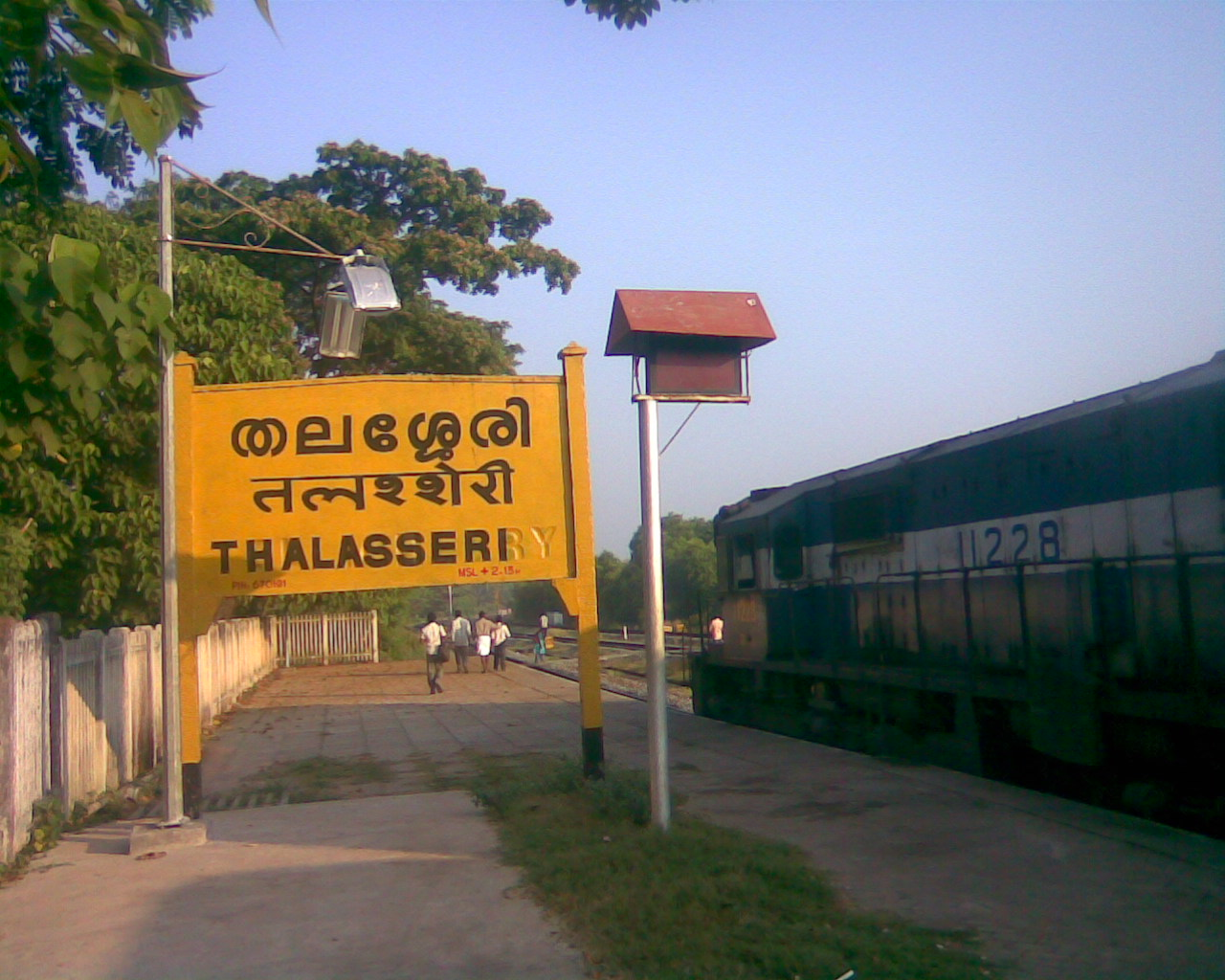

General information
- Location: Thalassery, -670 101, Kerala; India
- Coordinates: 11.752°N 75.494°E
- System: Indian Railways station
- Owner: Indian Railways
- Operator: Southern Railway zone
- Line: Shoranur–Mangalore section
- Platforms: 2
- Tracks: 3
- Connections: Bus terminal, Taxicab, Prepaid auto

Construction
- Structure type: Standard (on-ground station)
- Parking: Yes
- Accessible: Disabled access

Other information
- Status: Functioning
- Station code: TLY
- Zone(s): Southern Railway zone
- Division(s): Palakkad
- Classification: NSG – 3; Class 'A'

History
- Opened: 1901; 125 years ago
- Electrified: 25 kV AC 50 Hz
- Former names: Tellicherry

Passengers
- 2018-19: 12,171 per day
- Rank: 8 (in Kerala); 4 (in Palakkad division)
Route map
- Sources
Location
- Location within India Location within Kerala

Thalassery railway station (station code: TLY) is an NSG–3 category Indian railway station in Palakkad railway division of Southern Railway zone. It is a railway station serving the City of Thalassery in Kerala. It lies in the Shoranur–Mangalore section of the Southern Railways. It is the third largest station in Kerala in terms of number of passengers under Palakkad division. The station has two platforms and three tracks. Though no trains originate from this station, trains halting at the station connect the city to prominent cities in India such as Thiruvananthapuram, Kochi, Chennai, Mumbai, Bangalore, Kozhikode, Coimbatore, Quilon, New Delhi, Mangalore, Pune, Jaipur, Jammu Tawi, Okha and so forth.

Following the renovation of Thalassery railway station, the old platform ticket counter has been closed. The new ticket counter is now situated at Platform No. 02. The road connecting Thallassery railway station is known as Goodshed Road, which is commonly referred to as the new railway station road. Thal railway station previously had a goods transportation facility, which has been discontinued and relocated to Edakkad railway station.

No direct line connects Thalassery to Mysore, although a feasibility study for such a route was funded in 2013.

TLY railway station is a Class 'A' railway station. Almost all major trains connecting the other parts of Kerala, Tamil Nadu, Andhra Pradesh and North India halt here.

Thalassery (Station Code: TLY) and Jagannath Temple Gate (Station Code: JGE) are two different stations which serve Tellicherry city.

== Infrastructure ==
Thalassery railway station has two platforms, namely Platform No.1 and 2 with two entrances. There are two ticket counters. The railway station has lift as well as escalator facilities to cross platform. The station is also equipped with free wireless internet access facility, and prepaid auto stand.

== Location ==
Thalassery Railway station is located just 700 m from Thalassery New Bus Stand in Narangapuram.

Kannur International Airport is just 24 km from the railway station which will be the airport station.

== Important trains ==
- Jan Shatabdi Express
- Mangala Lakshadweep Superfast Express
- Netravati Express
- Parasuram Express
- Ernakulam Intercity Express
- Coimbatore Intercity Superfast Express
- Ernad Express
- Malabar Express
- Maveli Express
- Navyug Express(Service Permanently stopped )
- Vivek Express
- Poorna Express
- Chennai Superfast Mail
- West Coast Superfast Express
- Chennai Superfast Express
- Alleppey Executive Express
- Mangalore–Trivandrum Express
- Yeswantpur Express via Salem
- Murudeshwar –Kacheguda Express
- Okha–Ernakulam Express
- Gandhidam–Nagercoil Express
- Veraval–Trivandrum Express
- Bhavnagar–Kochuveli Express
- LTT–Kochuveli Superfast Express
- Kochuveli Mumbai LTT GARIB RATH

== See also ==
- Thalassery
- Malabar Coast
- North Malabar
- Jaganath Temple Gate railway station
- Dharmadam railway station
- Palakkad railway division
