= West Coast Superfast Express =

Train in India

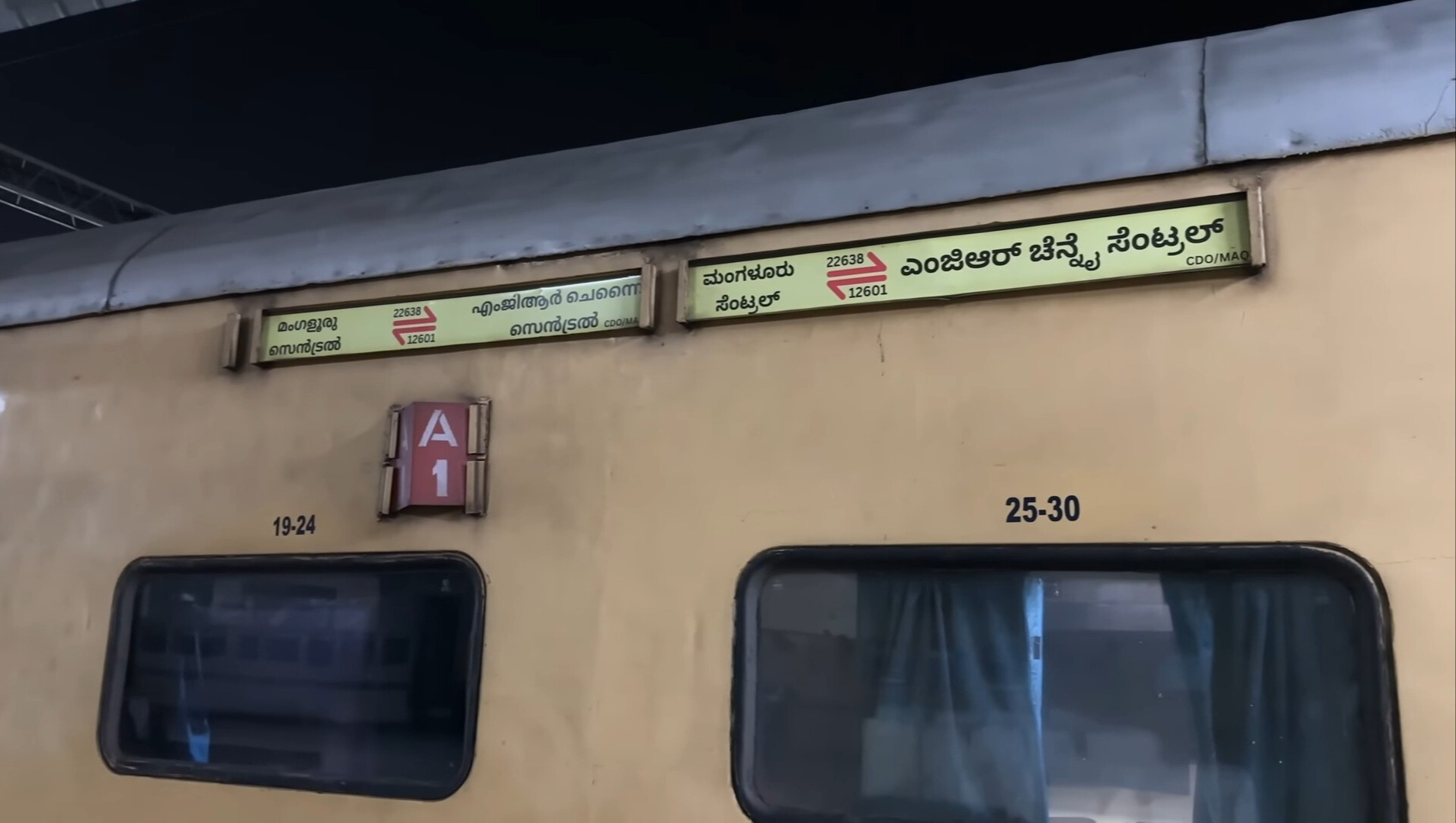

Overview
- Service type: Superfast Express
- Locale: Tamil Nadu, Kerala & Karnataka
- First service: 1 April 1965; 61 years ago
- Current operator: South Western Railway

Route
- Termini: MGR Chennai Central (MAS); Mangaluru Central (MAQ)
- Stops: 30
- Distance travelled: 902 km (560 mi)
- Average journey time: 16 hrs approx.
- Service frequency: Daily
- Train number: 22637 / 22638

On-board services
- Classes: AC 2 Tier, AC 3 Tier, Sleeper Class, General Unreserved,
- Seating arrangements: Yes
- Sleeping arrangements: Yes
- Catering facilities: On-board catering, E-catering
- Observation facilities: Large windows
- Baggage facilities: No
- Other facilities: Below the seats

Technical
- Rolling stock: LHB coach
- Track gauge: 1,676 mm (5 ft 6 in)
- Operating speed: 56 km/h (35 mph) average including halts.
Route map
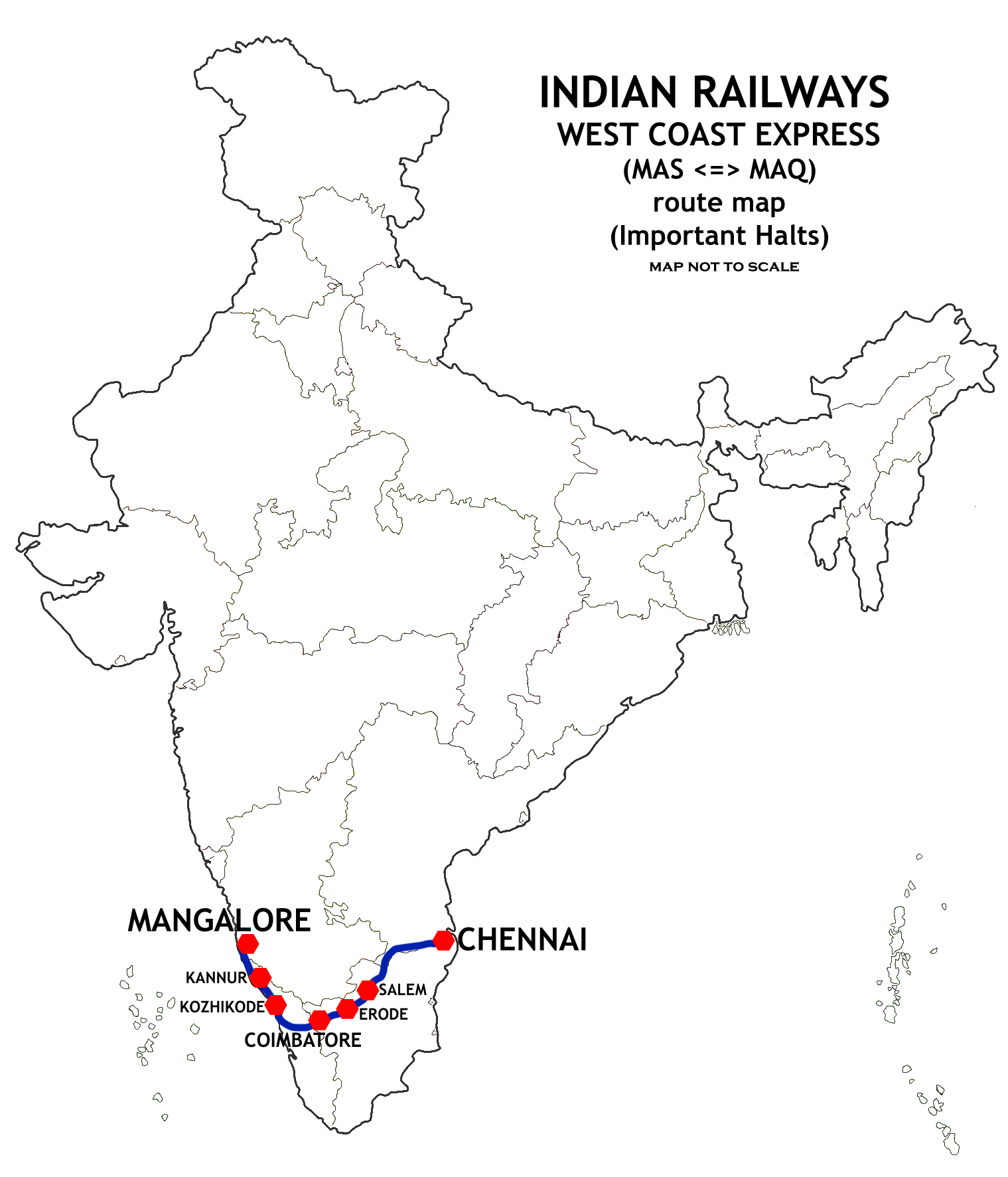

The 22637 / 22638 West Coast Superfast Express is a daily superfast express train connecting the city of Chennai, in Tamil Nadu, with the port city of Mangaluru in Karnataka via Coimbatore Junction. It is one of the trains connecting the Bay of Bengal and Arabian Sea and the oldest train on this route . Since August 1, 2021, the train runs with new timings.

The name traces to the location of Mangalore which is on the west coast of India. It is one of the oldest trains and also provides a day-time connectivity to Coimbatore from Chennai.

The train shares its rake with the Mangalore Mail which also traverses the same route.

In 2014 Ministry of Indian Railways Announced the Service Type of West Coast Express as Superfast The Schedule and Train Number also Changed from 16627/16628-> 22637/22638.

== History ==
Introduced in 1965 as an Express train sharing rakes with Mangalore Mail, It was later upgraded to Superfast Express train in June 2014. When introduced, it ran with a WDM-2 from Erode Diesel Loco Shed for the whole journey. Later after 1990 when the route electrified till Erode, it used electric locomotive from Chennai to Erode and a diesel loco from Erode to Mangalore. After electrification till Mangalore was completed, it now uses WAP-4 / WAP-7 in its entire journey. It used to take 17 hrs 15 mins to cover 902 kilometres (560 mi) running at 52.29 kilometres per hour (32.49 mph) speed.

== Loco link and coach composition ==
When introduced, it ran with a WDM-2 from Erode Diesel Loco Shed for the whole journey. Later after 1990 when the route electrified till Erode, it used electric locomotive from Chennai to Erode and a diesel loco from Erode to Mangalore. After electrification till Mangalore was completed, it now uses WAP-4 / WAP-7 in its entire journey.

It has a total of 22 LHB coaches excluding the locomotive. It has 1 HCPV or High Capacity Parcel Van, 2 Guard Vans (One at each end). 4 General Compartments (1 GS compartment illegally occupied by RMS), 10 Sleeper coaches, 4 AC Three Tier, 1 AC Two Tier. and an RMS. When it departs Mangalore Central as 22638 for the return journey to Chennai, the RMS or Rail Mail Service coach is put at the end of the train.
