= Bekal Fort railway station =

Railway station in Kerala, India

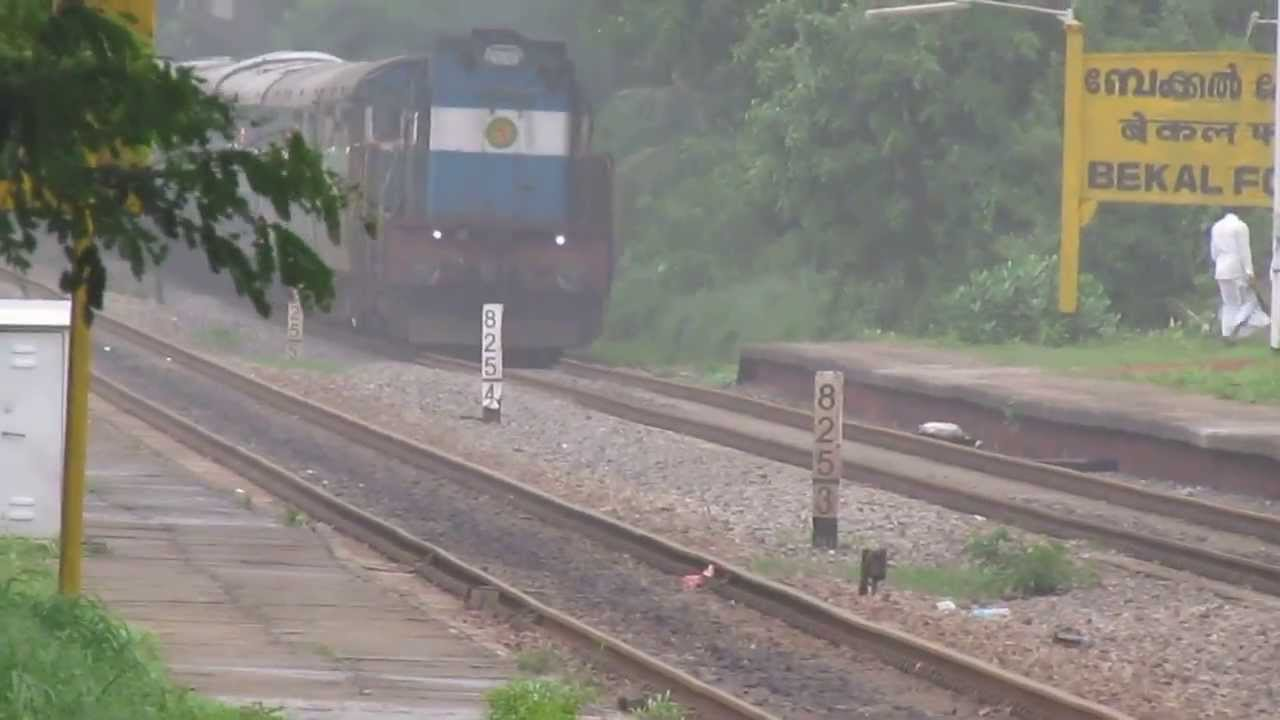
- Bekal fort Railway station

General information
- Location: Pallikkara, Kasaragod, Kerala; India
- Coordinates: 12.3869°N 75.0429°E
- Elevation: 150 ft (46 m)
- System: Indian Railways station Normal station
- Owner: Indian railway
- Operator: Palakkad division, Southern Railway
- Line: Shoranur Mangaluru Double line
- Platforms: 2
- Tracks: 2
- Connections: Bus stop, Taxi stand

Construction
- Structure type: Standard (on ground station)
- Parking: Yes
- Accessible: Wheel chair

Other information
- Status: Functioning
- Station code: BFR
- Zone(s): Southern Railway
- Division(s): Palakkad

History
- Opened: 1910
- Closed: -
- Rebuilt: 2 March 2023
- Electrified: 1 May 2016
- Former names: Pallikkare Railway station

Passengers
- 2,00,0000: 1,00,0000
Location
- Location within India Location within Kerala

Bekal Fort railway station (station code: BFR) is an NSG–4 category Indian railway station in Palakkad railway division of Southern Railway zone. It is an important railway station in Kasaragod district which serves thousands of people per day. It comes under the Southern Railway zone of Indian Railways. Bekal Fort railway station handles around 10 trains and serves about 5000 of people per day. It is situated next to the Bekal Fort Beach and near to the Bekal Fort. The older name of this railway station was Pallikkere railway station. But later, it was named after the Bekal Fort as 'Bekal Fort Railway Station'. The Indian Railways has about 13 acres of land in the surrounding of the Bekal Fort railway station.

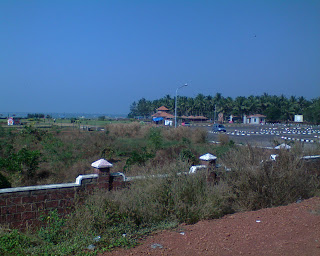
A view of Bekal Beach Park from the station
