= Pazhayangadi railway station =

Railway station in Kerala, India

Pazhayangadi
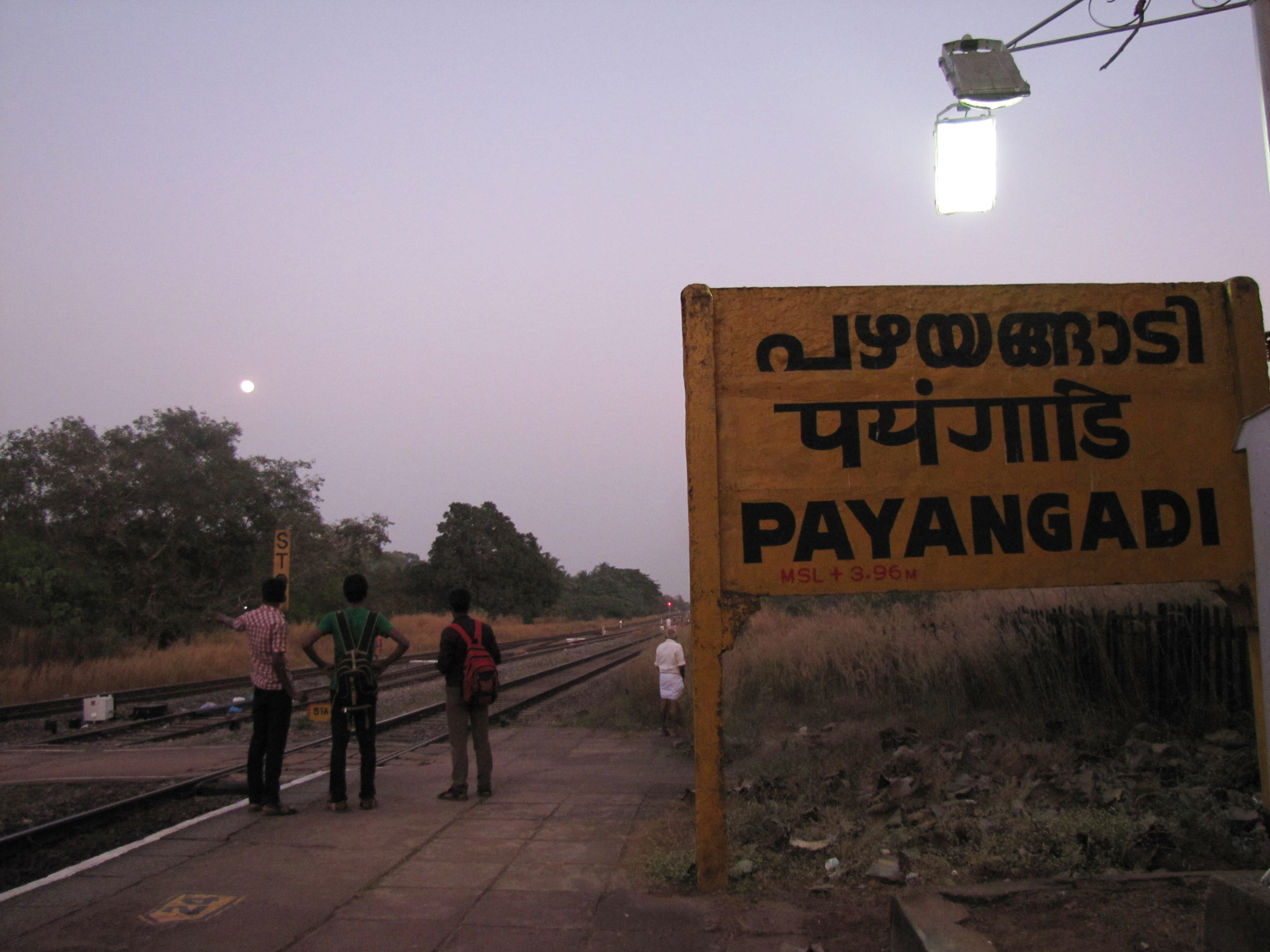
- The station board and tracks at Pazhayangadi station in 2012

General information
- Location: Pazhayangadi, Kannur, Kerala; India
- Coordinates: 12.02194°N 75.26012°E
- System: Regional rail, light rail & commuter rail station
- Owner: Indian Railways
- Operator: Southern Railway zone
- Line: Shoranur–Mangalore line
- Platforms: 2
- Tracks: 3

Construction
- Structure type: At–grade
- Parking: Available

Other information
- Status: Functioning
- Station code: PZGD
- Zone(s): Southern Railway zone
- Division(s): Palakkad
- Fare zone: Indian Railways

History
- Opened: 1904; 122 years ago
Location
- Location within India Location within Kerala

Pazhayangadi railway station (also known as Payangadi railway station)(station code: PAZ) is an NSG–5 category Indian railway station in Palakkad railway division of Southern Railway zone. It is a railway station situated in Kannur district of Kerala state in India. In the 2025-26 fiscal year, Pazhayangadi railway station recorded ₹5.34 crore in passenger revenue.

== Location ==
Pazhayangadi Railway station is located just 1.2 km from Pazhayangadi Bus Stand.

Kannur International Airport is 50 km from the railway station which will be the airport station.

== Administration ==
It falls under the Palakkad railway division of the Southern Railway zone, Indian Railways.
