= Vadakara railway station =

Railway station in Kerala, India

Vatakara Railway Station
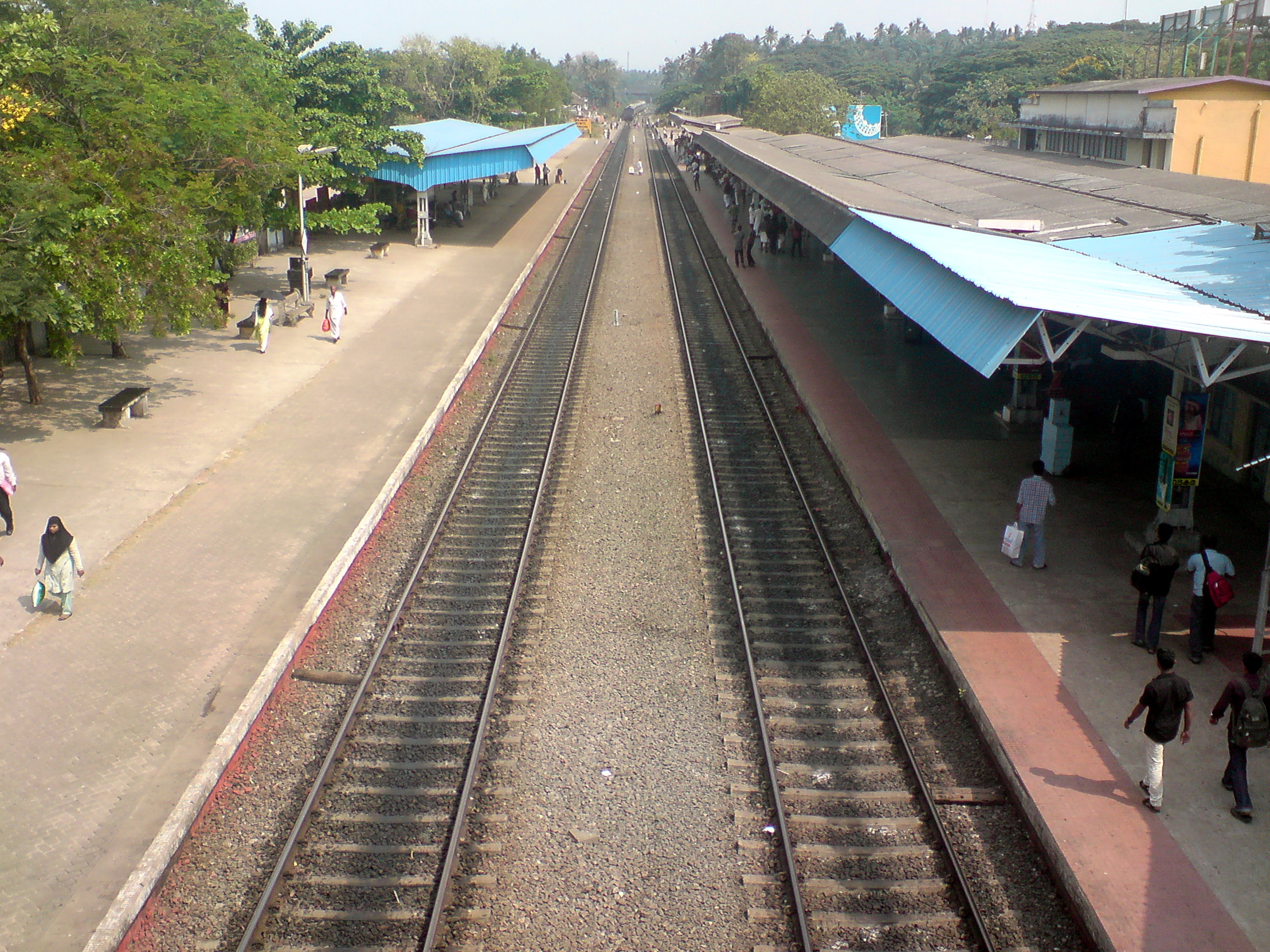

General information
- Other names: Badagara Railway Station
- Location: Railway Station Road, Vatakara, Kerala; India
- Coordinates: 11.593°N 75.587°E
- Elevation: 3.05 m (10.0 ft)
- System: Indian Railways station
- Owner: Indian Railways
- Operator: Southern Railway
- Line: Shoranur–Mangalore section
- Platforms: 3
- Tracks: 3
- Connections: Bus stand, Taxicab stand, Auto rickshaw stand

Construction
- Structure type: Standard (on ground station)
- Parking: Yes
- Accessible: Disabled access

Other information
- Status: Functioning
- Station code: BDJ
- Zone(s): Southern Railway
- Division(s): Palakkad
- Classification: NSG – 3; Class 'A'

History
- Opened: 1907

Passengers
- 2018-19: 9967 per day
Location
- Location within India Location within Kerala

Vatakara railway station (also known as Badagara railway station)(station code: BDJ) is an NSG–3 category Indian railway station in Palakkad railway division of Southern Railway zone. It is a major railway station serving the City of Vatakara, Kerala. It lies in the Shoranur–Mangalore section of the Southern Railway zone. The station has 3 platforms and 3 tracks. Although no trains originate from this station, most of the important trains passing through stop here. Trains halting at the station connect the town to prominent cities in India such as Thiruvananthapuram, Kochi, Chennai, Mumbai, Bangalore, Kozhikode, Coimbatore, Hyderabad, Ahmedabad, New Delhi, Pune, Mangalore, Kolkata and so forth. This station has now been upgraded to a Model railway station (adarsh).

== Facilities ==
- Online reservation counters
- Retirement rooms
- Parcel booking office
- Railway Mailing Service (RMS) office
- Refreshment stalls and book stalls
- Pre-paid parking
- State Bank ATM
- Railway information counter
- Cell phone recharge stalls
- RPF Out Post
- Railwire wifi
- Lifts
- Escalator

== Upcoming facilities ==
- New Parking Lot

== Gallery ==
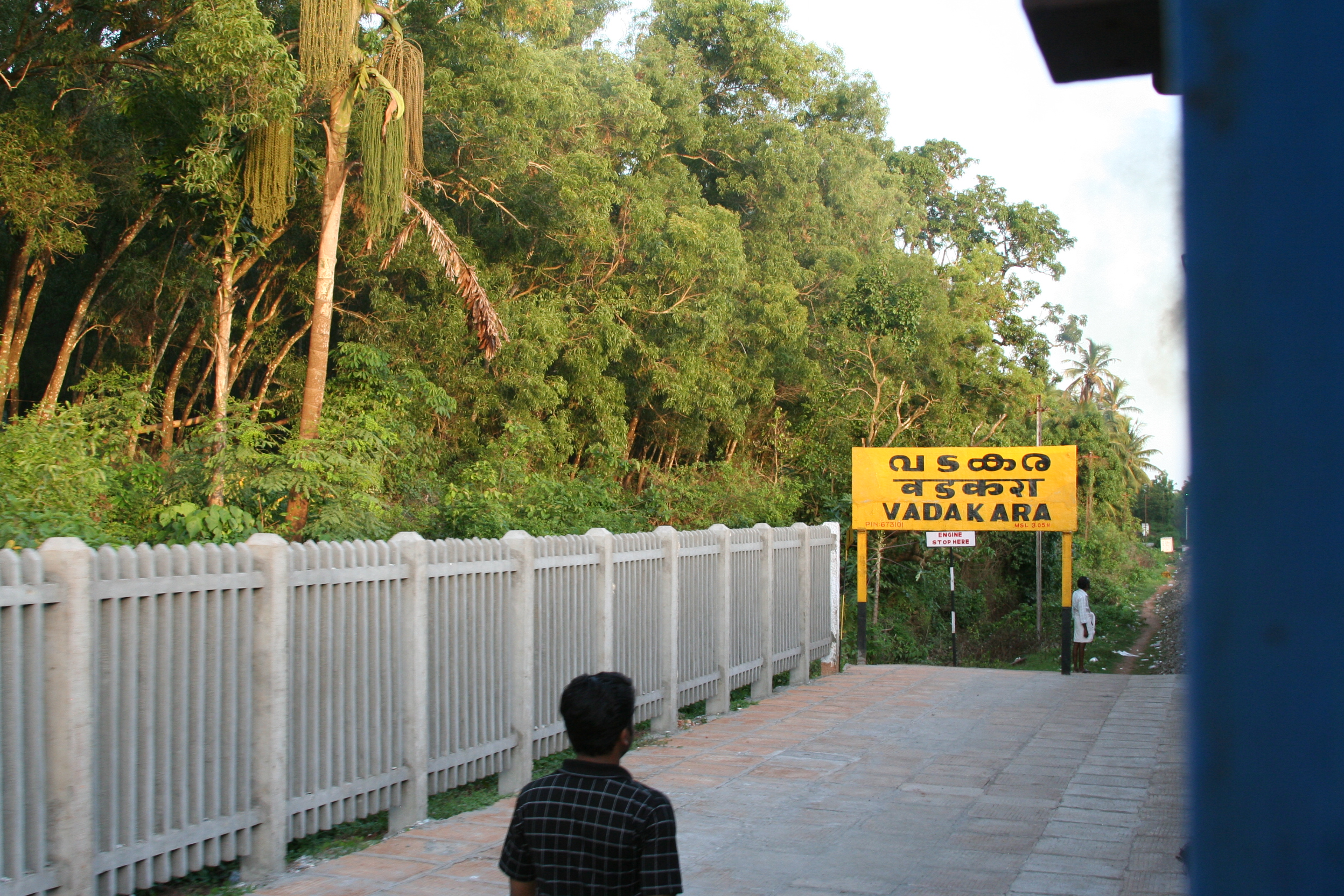
