= Parappanangadi railway station =

Railway station in Kerala, India

Parappanangadi Railway Station Parappanad Railway Station
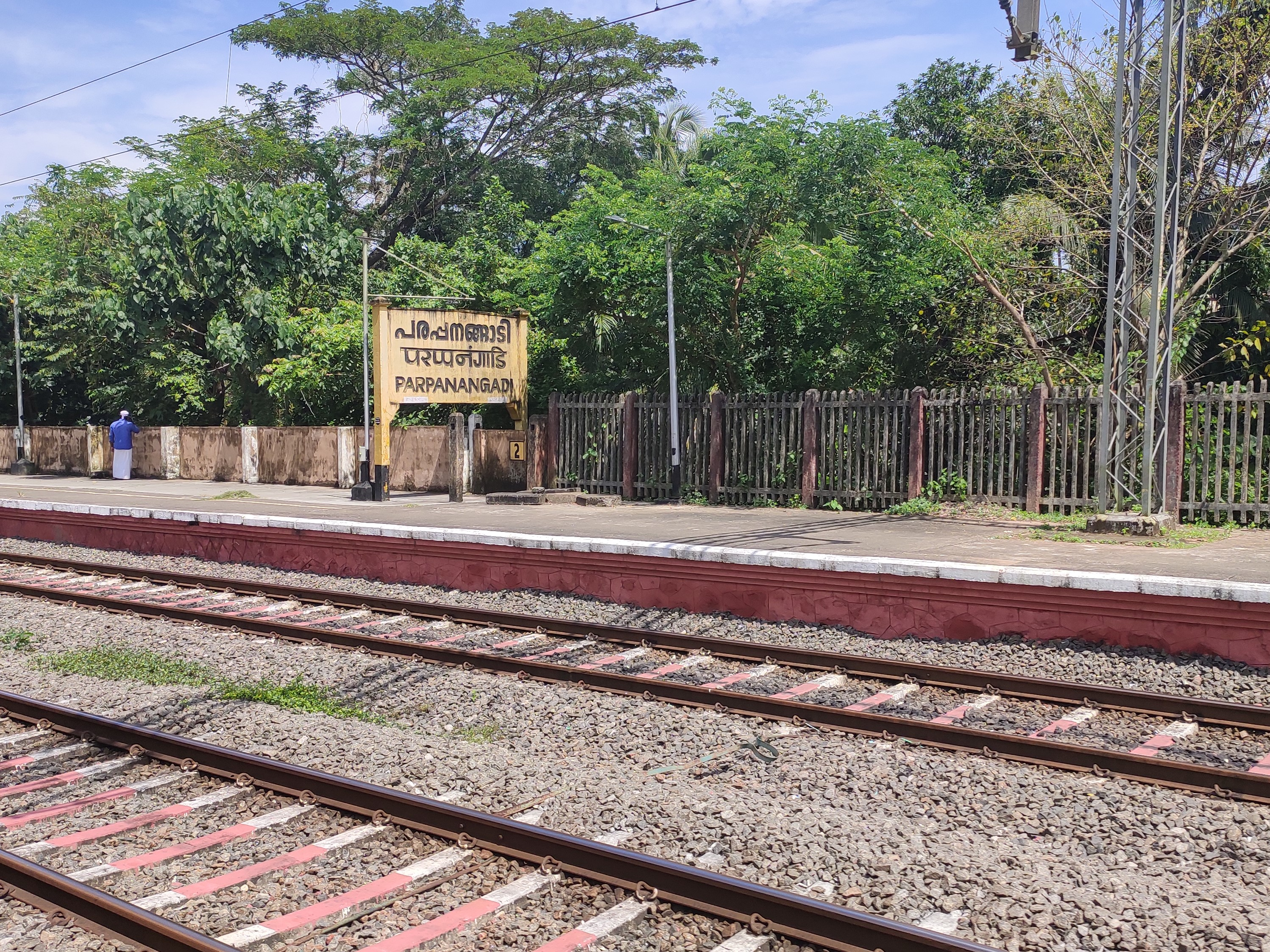
- Parappanangadi Railway station platform no 2

General information
- Location: Parappanangadi, Kerala, India
- Coordinates: 11.046°N 75.861°E
- Elevation: 10.36 metres (34.0 ft)
- System: Indian Railway Station
- Owner: Indian Railways
- Operator: Southern Railway zone
- Line: Shoranur–Mangalore section
- Platforms: 2
- Tracks: 3
- Connections: Bus stand, Taxicab stand, Auto rickshaw stand

Construction
- Structure type: Standard (on-ground station)
- Parking: yes
- Cycle facilities: yes
- Accessible: Disabled access

Other information
- Status: Functioning
- Station code: PGI
- Zone(s): Southern Railway zone
- Division(s): Palakkad
Route map
Location
- Location within India Location within Kerala

Parappanangadi Railway Station (station code: PGI) is an NSG–5 category Indian railway station in Palakkad railway division of Southern Railway zone. It is at the heart of the Parappanangadi town in Kerala, India, located 26 km away from Malappuram. It is one of the oldest railway stations in Kerala. This railway station was a part of the first rail route (Tirur-Beypore) in Kerala. The station code for Parappanangadi is PGI, which can be used for various purposes including online reservation.
