= Mahe railway station =

Railway station in Kerala, India

Mahe
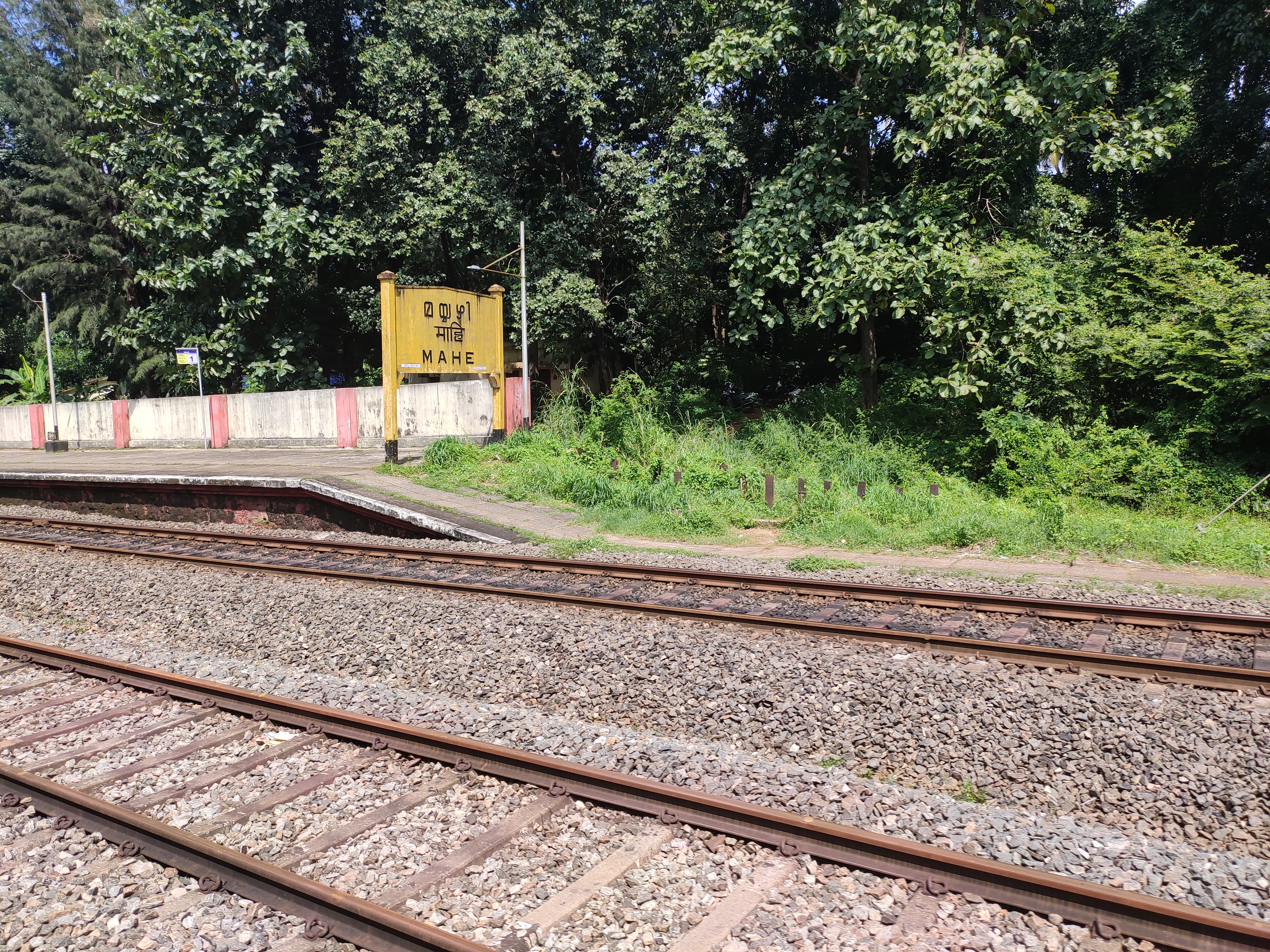

General information
- Location: Azhiyur, Kozhikode district, Kerala; India
- Coordinates: 11.69898245°N 75.5465786°E
- Elevation: 17 metres (56 ft)
- System: Regional rail, Light rail & Commuter rail station
- Owner: Indian Railways
- Operator: Southern Railway zone
- Line: Shoranur–Mangalore section
- Platforms: 2
- Tracks: 3

Construction
- Structure type: At–grade
- Parking: Available
- Accessible: Disabled access

Other information
- Status: Functioning
- Station code: MAHE
- Zone(s): Southern Railway zone
- Division(s): Palakkad
- Fare zone: Southern Railway zone

History
- Opened: 1904; 122 years ago
- Electrified: Yes (recently in 2022)
Route map
- Sources
Location

Mahe railway station (station code: MAHE) is an NSG–4 category Indian railway station in Palakkad railway division of Southern Railway zone. It is a railway station geographically located in Azhiyur, Kozhikode district, serves the Mahe district, Puducherry.

== Structure and amenities ==
The station consists of two platforms. The platforms are not well sheltered. It lacks many facilities including water and sanitation.
