= Railway High School Palakkad =

Railway Higher Secondary School, Palakkad
- Railway School

Location
- Kerala; India
- Coordinates: 10.817°N 76.637°E

Information
- Type: Higher secondary school
- Motto: Study, Serve, Shine
- Established: 1954
- Status: Open
- School district: Palakkad
- Oversight: Railway Board
- Principal: C.K. Hena
- Teaching staff: 28
- Houses
- Athletics: Yes
- Accreditation: CBSE, State Council of Educational Research and Training, Kerala
- Website: https://rhsspgt.in/

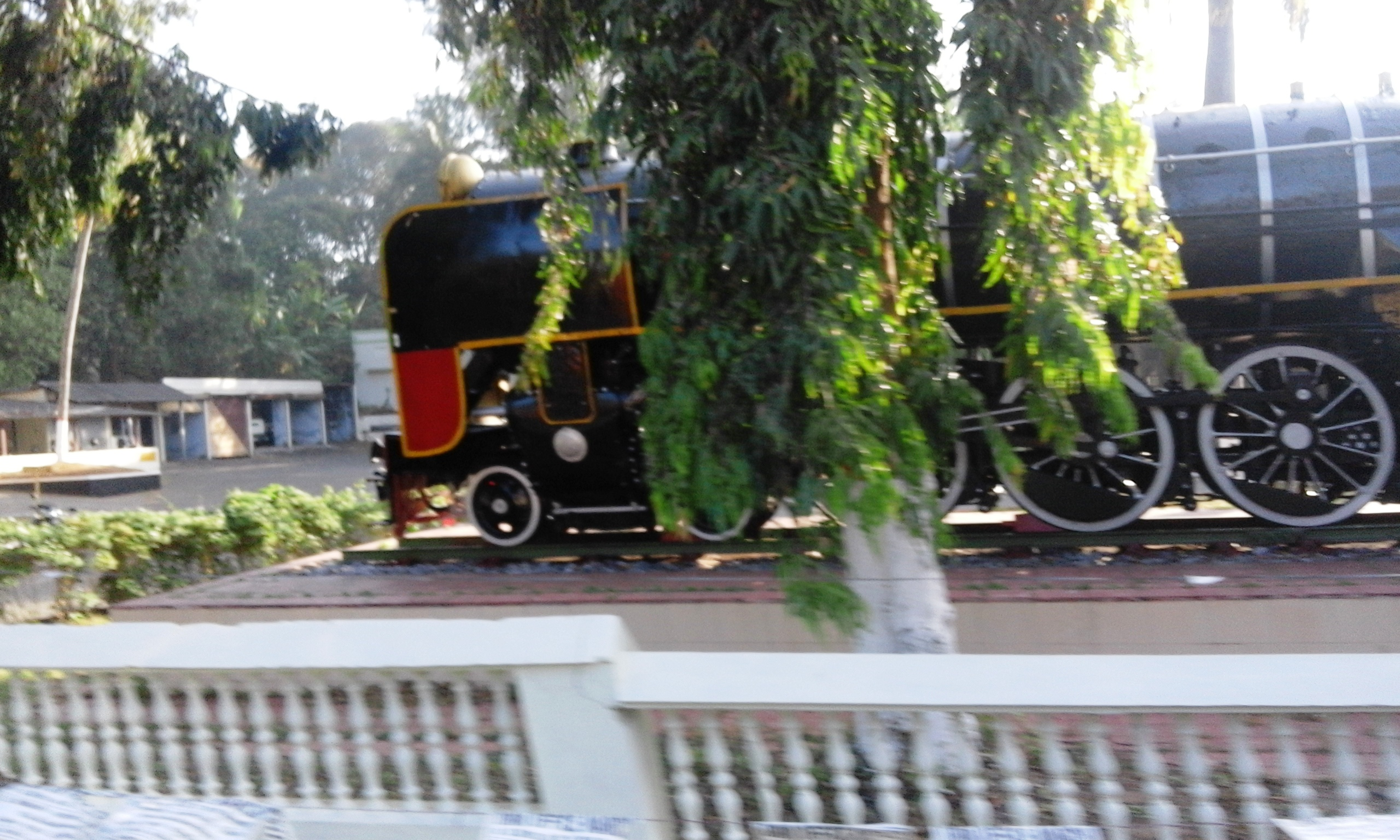
Railway Office in Dhoni Road

Railway High School, Palakkad is a high school located in Palakkad city, Kerala, India. It is the only school in the state which is undertaken by Southern Railway.

== History ==
The school was started by Indian Railways as a primary school, under an unaided programme of the government of Kerala. The school is situated within the Railway Colony precinct. Most residents of the railway colony sent their children to this school. The school did accept students whose parents were not employed by the Railways, as fee paying students, albeit in small numbers. The school was given financial support from the department of railways, had better infrastructure and teachers of high standards, resulting in better academic performance compared to schools in the district of Palakkad.

In 1979, the Headmaster Mr P Madhavan along with the Parent Teacher Association took up the issue of upgrading the school to a middle school. Due to lack of response from the State Government Authority, the Headmaster took upon a gamble to start 5th standard class. Several representations by TPA were undertaken to secure the approval from the department of education, Kerala, and the approvals came just in time causing anxiety among parents of students.

Except for one student, all the students had taken the transfer Certificate and had joined schools like PMG, St Thomas Higher Secondary School, while Prathapan PP continued in the school. The recognition from state government was accorded in time, and the rest of the students came back.

The first batch of 10th standard students passed out in 1984. The school achieved a 100% pass mark by all the students of the first batch scoring pass mark in the final SSLC exam conducted by the government of Kerala. On 2 April 2006 almost all of the students from the first batch got together. During this event many of the school teachers were felicitated. Several students from 1984 batch came from overseas to attend the function.

The school offers Malayalam and English divisions, and education up to class 12th[+2].

== Closure of Railway Schools ==
In 2018, Indian Railways announced its intent to withdraw support for its Railway Schools after 2018–19. Later, it revised its position, announcing support for schools with fifteen to twenty wards of railway employees. Palakkad was one of these schools.
