= Ferok railway station =

Railway station in Kerala, India

Ferok
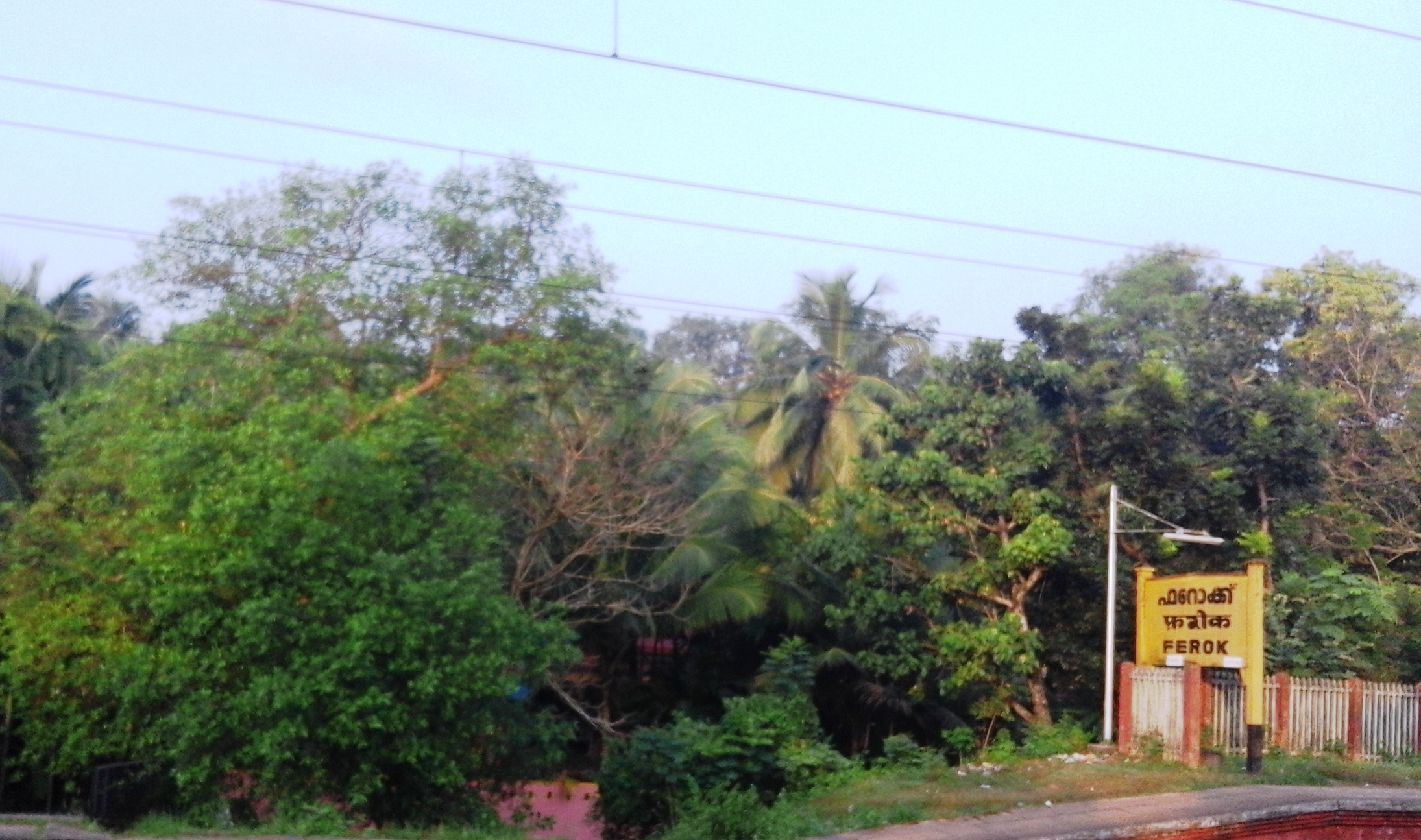
- Ferok railway station

General information
- Location: Feroke, Kozhikode, Kerala; India
- Coordinates: 11.17593°N 75.8302°E
- System: Regional rail, Light rail & Commuter rail station
- Owner: Indian Railways
- Operator: Southern Railway zone
- Line: Shoranur–Mangalore line
- Platforms: 2
- Tracks: 4

Construction
- Structure type: At–grade
- Parking: Available

Other information
- Status: Functioning
- Station code: FK
- Zone(s): Southern Railway zone
- Division(s): Palakkad
- Fare zone: Indian Railways

History
- Opened: 1904; 122 years ago
Route map
Location
- Location within India Location within Kerala

Ferok railway station (station code: FK) is an NSG–5 category Indian railway station in Palakkad railway division of Southern Railway zone. It is located in Kozhikode District, Kerala.

== Administration ==
The station falls under the Palakkad railway division of the Southern Railway zone, Indian Railways.

== Location ==
- 11 km from Kozhikode Town.
- 18 km From Calicut International Airport
