= Palakkad railway division =

Railway division of India

Overview
- Headquarters: Palakkad, Kerala, India
- Locale: Kerala; Tamil Nadu; Puducherry
- Dates of operation: August 31, 1956; 70 years ago–

Technical
- Track gauge: 1,676 mm (5 ft 6 in)
- Electrification: 25 kV AC 50 Hz
- Length: 577 kilometres (359 mi)

Palakkad railway division (formerly Olavakkod railway division) is one of the six administrative divisions of the Southern Railway zone of Indian Railways. It is headquartered at city of Palakkad, Kerala. It is the smallest railway division in Southern Railway. It was formed by dissolving the Podanur division. Managing 588 route kilometers of track in the states of Kerala, Tamil Nadu and Mahé (in the Union Territory of Puducherry), it is one of the oldest railway divisions in India and had a route connectivity of nearly 1,247 km before the formation of current Thiruvananthapuram and Salem divisions. The terminal facility of Palakkad division is situated in Shoranur Junction .

== History ==
Hon'ble Deputy Railway Minister Shri Alagesan announce in parliament "It has been decided to introduce the divisional system on the Southern Railway too, and there will be one headquarter in the Kerala area in which the hon. Member is interested, and that will be at Olavakot. What is today the Palakkad railway division was formed on 31 August 1956 as the fifth division of the Southern Railway, the first Railway Zone of the newly formed Indian Railways It was named Olavakkod railway division at the time because it was headquartered at the railway junction situated at Olavakkod a suburb of the city, which was later renamed to Palakkad Junction. At the time of its formation, it managed the broad-gauge trunk line from Jolarpet in Vellore district, Tamil Nadu to Mangalore in Karnataka via Coimbatore and Shoranur, including the Nilgiri Mountain Railway, the Shoranur–Cochin Harbor Terminus line and the Shoranur–Nilambur Road branch line, giving it a total of 1,247 km of route kilometers. In 1979, the Shoranur–CHTS line was delinked to create the new Thiruvananthapuram railway division, reducing trackage of the division to 1132 km. Most of Palakkad division was made double track in the three following decades. In 2007, the Palakkad division was cut in half as 623 km of route track from Jolarpettai to Podanur, including the Coimbatore region and the NMR were removed from Palakkad division to create the Salem division, reducing its route kilometers to 509. At this time 79 km of Meter Gauge track of the Palakkad Town - Pollachi and Pollachi - Podanur lines were granted to Palakkad as a consolation, making its total trackage to 588 km.

=== Timeline ===
- 1956: Podanur division was dissolved and Palakkad Division formed under the name Olavakkod railway division
- 1976: Entire stretch from Jolarpettai to Irugur is double track.
- 1979: Shoranur–Ernakulam line is handed over the Thiruvananthapuram division.
- 1984: Palakkad–Shornur doubling completed.
- 1991: Tiruppatur–Salem line electrified.
- 1992: Salem–Erode line electrified.
- 1994: Twin single lines (effectively double) between Podanur and Palghat opened.
- 1995: Palakkad–Shoranur line electrified.
- 1996: Erode–Palakkad line electrified.
- 1997: Palakkad Jn–Palakkad Town line electrified
- 2000, ‘X’ class Meter Gauge locomotives were rebuilt and successfully run on Nilgiri Mountain Railway
- 2007: Palakkad loses more than half of its trackage to the newly formed Salem division.
- 2014: Entire line stretch from Shoranur to Mangalore is double track.
- 2016: Gauge conversion of the Palakkad–Pollachi line completed.
- 2017: Shoranur–Mangalore line Electrified
- 2024: 100% electrification achieved after the 65.12 km broad gauge single section between Shornur Junction and Nilambur Road was inspected by Railway officials from Southern Railway on 30th March 2024.
- 2026: The Mangaluru railway region was officially transferred to the Mysuru division under the South Western Railway (SWR) zone on October 1, 2026.

== Area covered ==
The Palakkad division starts just after Podanur Junction and proceeds westwards towards Kerala. The double track line splits into two single track sections widely spaced apart after the Ettimadai station and pass through the jungles of the Palakkad Gap. The two tracks briefly reunite at the Walayar station, and then again split to join at Kanjikode. At Palakkad junction, the track to Palakkad Town and Pollachi branch off to the left. The main line continues onwards to Shoranur and the division jurisdiction ends just after the bridge across the Bharathappuzha. Two single lines connect Shoranur Junction to this mainline. From Shoranur the branch line to Nilambur branches off into the teak forests on the right, while the mainline continues on north and runs past Tirur, Kozhikode, Kannur and Kasargod, and ends on Kerala-Karnataka border.

== Major routes ==
- Shoranur-Kasaragod line
- Shoranur-Palakkad-Coimbatore line
- Shoranur-Nilambur line
- Palakkad-Pollachi line
- Podanur-Pollachi line

== Stations ==
The list includes the stations under the Palakkad railway division and their station category.

Category of station	No. of stations	Names of stations
NSG-1 Category	0	-
NSG-2 Category	2	Kozhikode, Kannur, Palakkad Junction
NSG-3 Category	8	Shoranur Junction, Kasaragod, Thalassery, Tirur, Vadakara, Payyanur, Koyilandi, Ottapalam
NSG-4 Category	6	Kanhangad, Kuttippuram, Feroke, Mahe, Bekal Fort
NSG-5 Category	14	Parappanangadi, Nilambur Road, Nileshwar, Pazhayangadi, Cheruvathur, Palakkad Town, Kannapuram, Pollachi Junction
NSG-6 Category	-	-
HG 1 Category	-	-
HG 2 Category	-	-
HG 3 Category	-	-
Total	-	-

Stations closed for Passengers - Bharathapuzha

== Traffic & passenger earnings details of railway stations ==
Rank	Station name	District	Area	Category	Total passengers (2023–24)	Total ticket revenue (2023–24)
1	Kozhikode	Kozhikode	North Kerala	NSG-2	11,451,049	₹190,53,86,518
2	Kannur	Kannur	North Kerala	NSG-2	7,189,311	₹121,62,73,168
3	Palakkad Junction	Palakkad	North Kerala	NSG-2	4,761,112	₹119,34,53,387
4	Shoranur Junction	Palakkad	North Kerala	NSG-3	3,511,138	₹59,30,52,380
5	Kasaragod	Kasaragod	North Kerala	NSG-3	2,870,813	₹49,70,41,198
6	Thalassery	Kannur	North Kerala	NSG-3	4,354,693	₹40,95,59,593
7	Tirur	Malappuram	North Kerala	NSG-3	3,515,286	₹32,35,68,672
8	Vadakara	Kozhikode	North Kerala	NSG-3	4,307,961	₹30,81,57,193

== See also ==
- Palakkad Junction railway station
- Palakkad Railway Colony
- Southern Railway zone
- Thiruvananthapuram railway division
- Shoranur Junction railway station
